= List of Singaporean electoral divisions (1980–1984) =

The following is a list of Singaporean electoral divisions from 1980 to 1984 that served as constituencies that elected Members of Parliament (MPs) to the 5th Parliament of Singapore in the 1980 Singaporean general elections. The number of seats in Parliament had increased by 6 to 75 seats. Since the 1968 Singaporean general election, no opposition candidate had been elected into Parliament under the People's Action Party (PAP) government until the 1981 by-election in Anson.

== Constituencies ==
District	Changes in 1980	Polling Districts	Total
Alexandra		AL 01 - AL 02	2
Aljunied	GS01	AJ 01 - AJ 03	3
Ang Mo Kio	JK03, SG03	AM 01 - AM 04	4
Anson	RM02	AS 01 - AS 04	4
Ayer Rajah	BT03	AR 01 - AR 03	3
Bedok	BD01 - BD02	BD 01 - BD 04	4
Boon Lay		BY 01 - BY 02	2
Boon Teck		BN 01 - BN 02	2
Braddell Heights	BL01, PL01	BL 01 - BL 05	5
Brickworks		BW 01 - BW 02	2
Bukit Batok		BK 01 - BK 06	6
Bukit Ho Swee		BH 01 - BH 02	2
Bukit Merah		BM 01 - BM 02	2
Bukit Panjang		BP 01 - BP 06	6
Bukit Timah		BT 01 - BT 04	4
Buona Vista		BV 01 - BV 02	2
Cairnhill	FP01 - FP02	CA 01 - CA 05	5
Changi	BD03, CH01 - CH05	CH 01 - CH 08	8
Cheng San	JK03, SG03	CS 01 - CS 03	3
Chong Boon	SG03	CN 01 - CN 02	2
Chua Chu Kang		CK 01 - CK 06	6
Clementi	BT03	CL 01 - CL 03	3
Delta		DL 01 - DL 02	2
Geylang Serai		GS 01 - GS 04	4
Geylang West		GW 01 - GW 03	3
Havelock		HK 01 - HK 02	2
Henderson		HS 01 - HS 03	3
Jalan Besar		JB 01 - JB 04	4
Jalan Kayu	JK01 - JK02, SG03	JK 01 - JK 05	5
Joo Chiat		JC 01 - JC 04	4
Jurong		JR 01 - JR 03	3
Kaki Bukit	BD03, KC02 - KC03	KB 01 - KB 06	6
Kallang		KL 01 - KL 03	3
Kampong Chai Chee	BD03, KC01	KC 01 - KC 04	4
Kampong Glam		KG 01 - KG 03	3
Kampong Kembangan	KC02 - KC03, SL03	KN 01 - KN 06	2
Kampong Ubi		KU 01 - KU 03	3
Katong		KT 01 - KT 02	2
Kebun Baru	AM01 - AM04, NS02	KR 01 - KR 05	5
Khe Bong		KE 01 - KE 03	3
Kim Keat		KM 01 - KM 02	2
Kim Seng		KS 01 - KS 02	2
Kolam Ayer		KY 01 - KY 03	3
Kreta Ayer		KA 01 - KA 02	2
Kuo Chuan		KH 01 - KH 03	3
Leng Kee		LK 01 - LK 02	2
MacPherson		MP 01 - MP 02	2
Marine Parade		MA 01 - MA 02	2
Moulmein	FP02 - FP03	MM 01 - MM 05	5
Mountbatten		MB 01 - MB 02	2
Nee Soon	NS01	NS 01 - NS 02	2
Pasir Panjang		PP 01 - PP 02	2
Paya Lebar	BL02, US03	PL 01 - PL 04	4
Potong Pasir		PS 01 - PS 02	2
Punggol		PG 01 - PG 05	5
Queenstown		QT 01 - QT 02	2
Radin Mas	RM01, TL02	RM 01 - RM 05	5
River Valley		RV 01 - RV 03	3
Rochore		RC 01 - RC 03	3
Sembawang		SB 01 - SB 03	3
Serangoon Gardens	US01 - US02	SG 01 - SG 03	3
Siglap	SL01 - SL03	SL 01 - SL 03	3
Tampines		TM 01 - TM 05	5
Tanah Merah	BD03, CH06	TR 01 - TR 03	3
Tanglin		TN 01 - TN 03	3
Tanjong Pagar		TP 01 - TP 03	3
Telok Ayer		TA 01 - TA 03	3
Telok Blangah	TL01 - TL02	TL 01 - TL 04	4
Thomson		TH 01 - TH 03	3
Tiong Bahru		TG 01 - TG 04	4
Toa Payoh		TY 01 - TY 03	3
Ulu Pandan		UP 01 - UP 03	3
West Coast	BT03 - BT04	WE 01 - WE 04	4
Whampoa		W 01 - W 02	2
Yio Chu Kang	AM02 - AM03, NS02	YK 01 - YK 05	5

- Alexandra
- Aljunied
- Ang Mo Kio
- Anson
- Ayer Rajah
- Bedok
- Boon Lay
- Boon Teck
- Braddell Heights
- Brickworks
- Bukit Batok
- Bukit Ho Swee
- Bukit Merah
- Bukit Panjang
- Bukit Timah
- Buona Vista
- Cairnhill
- Changi
- Cheng San
- Chong Boon
- Chua Chu Kang
- Clementi
- Delta
- Geylang Serai
- Geylang West
- Havelock
- Henderson
- Jalan Besar
- Jalan Kayu
- Joo Chiat
- Jurong
- Kaki Bukit
- Kallang
- Kampong Chai Chee
- Kampong Glam
- Kampong Kembangan
- Kampong Ubi
- Katong
- Kebun Baru
- Khe Bong
- Kim Keat
- Kim Seng
- Kolam Ayer
- Kreta Ayer
- Kuo Chuan
- Leng Kee
- MacPherson
- Marine Parade
- Moulmein
- Mountbatten
- Nee Soon
- Pasir Panjang
- Paya Lebar
- Potong Pasir
- Punggol
- Queenstown
- Radin Mas
- River Valley
- Rochore
- Sembawang
- Serangoon Gardens
- Siglap
- Tampines
- Tanah Merah
- Tanglin
- Tanjong Pagar
- Telok Ayer
- Telok Blangah
- Thomson
- Tiong Bahru
- Toa Payoh
- Ulu Pandan
- West Coast
- Whampoa
- Yio Chu Kang
