= 5th Parliament of Singapore =

Singaporean parliamentary meeting

←	4th	6th	→
- Initial composition Government: PAP (75)

Overview
- Legislative body: Parliament of Singapore
- Meeting place: Old Parliament House
- Term: 3 February 1981 – 4 December 1984 (3 years, 10 months and 1 day)
- Election: 23 December 1980
- Government: People's Action Party
- Opposition: Workers' Party (from 31 October 1981)

Parliament of Singapore
- Members: 75
- Speaker: Yeoh Ghim Seng
- Leader of the House: E. W. Barker
- Prime Minister: Lee Kuan Yew
- Leader of the Opposition: J. B. Jeyaretnam (from 31 October 1981)
- Party control: PAP supermajority

Sessions
- 1st: 3 February 1981 – 4 December 1984 (3 years, 10 months and 1 day)

The 5th Parliament of Singapore was a meeting of the Parliament of Singapore. It commenced its first and only session on 3 February 1981 and was dissolved on 4 December 1984.

The members of the Fifth Parliament were elected in the 1980 general election. Parliament was controlled by a People's Action Party majority, led by Prime Minister Lee Kuan Yew and his Cabinet. Yeoh Ghim Seng served as speaker.

The Fifth Parliament was notable for the first presence of opposition since 1968 when J. B. Jeyaretnam, leader of the Workers' Party, won the 1981 by-election in Anson, which was previously held by PAP legislator Devan Nair, who resigned to assume the office of the President of Singapore.

== Results of the 1980 general election ==
Party	Votes	%	Seats	+/–
People's Action Party	494,268	77.66	75	▲6
Workers' Party	39,590	6.22	0	Steady
United People's Front	28,586	4.49	0	Steady
United Front	27,522	4.32	0	Steady
Barisan Sosialis	16,488	2.59	0	Steady
Singapore Malay National Organisation	13,435	2.11	0	Steady
Singapore Democratic Party	11,292	1.77	0	New
Singapore Justice Party	5,271	0.83	0	Steady
Total	636,452	100.00	75	▲6
Valid votes	636,452	97.27		
Invalid/blank votes	17,843	2.73		
Total votes	654,295	100.00		
Registered voters/turnout	1,290,426	95.50		
Source: Singapore Elections

== Officeholders ==
- Speaker: Yeoh Ghim Seng (Joo Chiat, PAP)
- Deputy Speaker: Hwang Soo Jin (Jalan Kayu, PAP)
- Prime Minister: Lee Kuan Yew (Tanjong Pagar, PAP)
- Deputy Prime Minister:
  - Goh Keng Swee (Kreta Ayer, PAP)
  - S. Rajaratnam (Kampong Glam, PAP)
- Leader of the House: E. W. Barker (Tanglin, PAP)
- Leader of the Opposition: J. B. Jeyaretnam (Anson, WP), from 31 October 1981
- Government Party Whip: Lee Yiok Seng (Bukit Panjang, PAP)

== Composition ==
Party	Members	
Party	At election	At dissolution
People's Action Party	75	73
Workers' Party	0	1
Vacant seats	0	1
Total	75	75
Government majority	75	72

== Members ==
Constituency	Member	Party
Alexandra	Tan Soo Khoon 陈树群	PAP
Aljunied	Chin Harn Tong 钱翰琮	PAP
Ang Mo Kio	Yeo Toon Chia 杨敦清	PAP
Anson	Devan Nair (until 1981) (Note: Nair resigned on 14 October 1981 to become the President of Singapore.) ദേവൻ നായർ	PAP
Anson	J. B. Jeyaretnam (from 1981) (Note: Jeyaretnam was elected on 31 October 1981 in the 1981 Anson by-election.) ஜே. பி. ஜெயரத்தினம்	WP
Ayer Rajah	Tan Cheng Bock 陈清木	PAP
Bedok	S. Jayakumar எஸ். செயக்குமார்	PAP
Boon Lay	Goh Chee Wee 吴志伟	PAP
Boon Teck	Liew Kok Pun 廖国斌	PAP
Braddell Heights	Lee Khoon Choy 李炯才	PAP
Brickworks	Ahmad Mattar أحمد مطر	PAP
Bukit Batok	Chai Chong Yii 蔡崇语	PAP
Bukit Ho Swee	Seah Mui Kok 佘美国	PAP
Bukit Merah	Lim Chee Onn 林子安	PAP
Bukit Panjang	Lee Yiok Seng 李玉胜	PAP
Bukit Timah	Chor Yeok Eng 曹煜英	PAP
Buona Vista	Ang Kok Peng 洪国平	PAP
Cairnhill	Wong Kwei Cheong 黄贵祥	PAP
Changi	Teo Chong Tee 张宗治	PAP
Cheng San	Lee Yock Suan 李玉全	PAP
Chong Boon	S. Chandra Das எஸ். சந்திர தாஸ்	PAP
Chua Chu Kang	Tang See Chim 邓思沾	PAP
Clementi	Bernard Chen 陈天立	PAP
Delta	Yeo Choo Kok 杨子国	PAP
Geylang Serai	Othman Haron Eusofe عثمان هارون يوسف	PAP
Geylang West	Teh Cheang Wan 郑章远	PAP
Havelock	Hon Sui Sen (until 1983) (Note: Hon died of a heart attack on 14 October 1983.) 韩瑞生	PAP
Henderson	Lai Tha Chai 黎达材	PAP
Jalan Besar	Chan Chee Seng 陈志成	PAP
Jalan Kayu	Hwang Soo Jin 黄树人	PAP
Joo Chiat	Yeoh Ghim Seng 杨锦成	PAP
Jurong	Ho Kah Leong 何家良	PAP
Kaki Bukit	Saidi Shariff سيدي شريف	PAP
Kallang	S. Dhanabalan எஸ். தநபாலன்	PAP
Kampong Chai Chee	Fong Sip Chee 邝摄治	PAP
Kampong Glam	S. Rajaratnam எஸ். ராஜரத்தினம்	PAP
Kampong Kembangan	Mansor Sukaimi منصور سوكايمي	PAP
Kampong Ubi	Wan Hussin Zoohri وان حُسَيْن زوهري	PAP
Katong	J. F. Conceicao	PAP
Kebun Baru	Lim Boon Heng 林文兴	PAP
Khe Bong	Ho See Beng 何思明	PAP
Kim Keat	Ong Teng Cheong 王鼎昌	PAP
Kim Seng	Yeo Ning Hong 杨林丰	PAP
Kolam Ayer	Sidek Saniff صديق صانف	PAP
Kreta Ayer	Goh Keng Swee 吴庆瑞	PAP
Kuo Chuan	P. Selvadurai பி. செல்வதுரை	PAP
Leng Kee	Ow Chin Hock 欧进福	PAP
MacPherson	Chua Sian Chin 蔡善进	PAP
Marine Parade	Goh Chok Tong 吴作栋	PAP
Moulmein	Lawrence Sia 谢坤祥	PAP
Mountbatten	Eugene Yap 叶尧清	PAP
Nee Soon	Koh Lip Lin 高立人	PAP
Pasir Panjang	Abbas Abu Amin عباس أبو أمين	PAP
Paya Lebar	Sia Kah Hui 谢嘉惠	PAP
Potong Pasir	Howe Yoon Chong 侯永昌	PAP
Punggol	Ng Kah Ting 黄嘉腾	PAP
Queenstown	Jek Yeun Thong 易润堂	PAP
Radin Mas	M. K. A. Jabbar م. ک. أ. جبار	PAP
River Valley	Tay Eng Soon 郑永顺	PAP
Rochore	Toh Chin Chye 杜进才	PAP
Sembawang	Tony Tan 陈庆炎	PAP
Serangoon Gardens	Lau Teik Soon 刘德顺	PAP
Siglap	Abdul Rahim Ishak عبد الرحيم إسحاق	PAP
Tampines	Phua Bah Lee 潘峇厘	PAP
Tanah Merah	Lee Chiaw Meng 李昭铭	PAP
Tanglin	E. W. Barker	PAP
Tanjong Pagar	Lee Kuan Yew 李光耀	PAP
Telok Ayer	Ong Pang Boon 王邦文	PAP
Telok Blangah	Rohan Kamis روحان خميس	PAP
Thomson	Chau Sik Ting 赵锡盛	PAP
Tiong Bahru	Ch'ng Jit Koon 庄日昆	PAP
Toa Payoh	Eric Cheong 张润志	PAP
Ulu Pandan	Chiang Hai Ding 张泰澄	PAP
West Coast	Wan Soon Bee 阮顺美	PAP
Whampoa	Augustine Tan 陈惠兴	PAP
Yio Chu Kang	Lau Ping Sum 刘炳森	PAP
