= List of defunct electoral divisions of Singapore =

This is a list of defunct electoral divisions of Singapore.

== History ==
In 1988, following the establishment of group representation constituency (GRC) and single-member constituency (SMC), all the constituencies are renamed as single-member constituency or group representation constituency respectively.

In 2025, several GRCs were abolished to create double-barrelled named GRCs to "better reflect the identities of the geographical areas in the GRCs".

== Constituency ==
- Alexandra Constituency
- Aljunied Constituency
- Anson Constituency
- Balestier Constituency
- Bedok Constituency
- Bo Wen Constituency
- Boon Teck Constituency
- Bras Basah Constituency
- Brickworks Constituency
- Bukit Ho Swee Constituency
- Cairnhill Constituency
- Changkat Constituency
- Cheng San Constituency
- Chong Boon Constituency
- City Constituency
- Clementi Constituency
- Crawford Constituency
- Delta Constituency
- Eunos Constituency
- Farrer Park Constituency
- Geylang Constituency
- Geylang East Constituency
- Geylang Serai Constituency
- Havelock Constituency
- Henderson Constituency
- Hong Kah Constituency
- Hong Lim Constituency
- Jalan Besar Constituency
- Jalan Kayu Constituency
- Kaki Bukit Constituency
- Kampong Chai Chee Constituency
- Kampong Kapor Constituency
- Kampong Kembangan Constituency
- Kampong Ubi Constituency
- Katong Constituency
- Keppel Constituency
- Khe Bong Constituency
- Kolam Ayer Constituency
- Kuo Chuan Constituency
- Marine Parade Constituency
- Nee Soon Constituency
- Pasir Panjang Constituency
- Punggol–Tampines Constituency
- Queenstown Constituency
- River Valley Constituency
- Rochore Constituency
- Rural East Constituency
- Rural West Constituency
- Seletar Constituency
- Sembawang Constituency
- Sepoy Lines Constituency
- Serangoon Constituency
- Serangoon Gardens Constituency
- Southern Islands Constituency
- Stamford Constituency
- Tampines Constituency
- Tanah Merah Constituency
- Telok Ayer Constituency
- Toa Payoh Constituency
- Ulu Bedok Constituency
- Upper Serangoon Constituency
- West Coast Constituency

== Single-member constituency ==
- Ang Mo Kio Single Member Constituency
- Ayer Rajah Single Member Constituency
- Boon Lay Single Member Constituency
- Braddell Heights Single Member Constituency
- Bukit Batok Single Member Constituency
- Bukit Gombak Single Member Constituency
- Bukit Merah Single Member Constituency
- Bukit Timah Single Member Constituency
- Buona Vista Single Member Constituency
- Changi Single Member Constituency
- Chua Chu Kang Single Member Constituency
- Fengshan Single Member Constituency
- Geylang West Single Member Constituency
- Joo Chiat Single Member Constituency
- Jurong Single Member Constituency
- Kallang Single Member Constituency
- Kampong Glam Single Member Constituency
- Kim Keat Single Member Constituency
- Kim Seng Single Member Constituency
- Kreta Ayer Single Member Constituency
- Leng Kee Single Member Constituency
- Moulmein Single Member Constituency
- Nee Soon Central Single Member Constituency
- Nee Soon East Single Member Constituency
- Nee Soon South Single Member Constituency
- Paya Lebar Single Member Constituency
- Punggol Single Member Constituency
- Punggol East Single Member Constituency
- Punggol West Single Member Constituency
- Sengkang West Single Member Constituency
- Siglap Single Member Constituency
- Tanglin Single Member Constituency
- Tanjong Pagar Single Member Constituency
- Teck Ghee Single Member Constituency
- Telok Blangah Single Member Constituency
- Thomson Single Member Constituency
- Tiong Bahru Single Member Constituency
- Ulu Pandan Single Member Constituency
- Whampoa Single Member Constituency

== Multi-member constituency ==
- Municipal North-East (2)
- Municipal South-West (2)

== Group representation constituency ==
- Bedok Group Representation Constituency (4)
- Brickworks Group Representation Constituency (4)
- Bukit Timah Group Representation Constituency (5)
- Cheng San Group Representation Constituency (5)
- Eunos Group Representation Constituency (4)
- Holland–Bukit Panjang Group Representation Constituency (5)
- Hong Kah Group Representation Constituency (5)
- Jurong Group Representation Constituency (5)
- Kampong Glam Group Representation Constituency (4)
- Kreta Ayer–Tanglin Group Representation Constituency (4)
- Marine Parade Group Representation Constituency (5)
- Moulmein–Kallang Group Representation Constituency (4)
- Pasir Panjang Group Representation Constituency (3)
- Pasir Ris Group Representation Constituency (4)
- Pasir Ris–Punggol Group Representation Constituency (5)
- Thomson Group Representation Constituency (4)
- Tiong Bahru Group Representation Constituency (3)
- Toa Payoh Group Representation Constituency (4)
- West Coast Group Representation Constituency (5)

== See also ==
- Constituencies of Singapore
