= List of Singaporean electoral divisions (1984–1988) =

The following is a list of Singaporean electoral divisions from 1984 to 1988 that served as constituencies that elected Members of Parliament (MPs) to the 6th Parliament of Singapore in the 1984 Singaporean general elections. The number of seats in Parliament had increased by 4 to 79 seats.

For the first time since the 1968 Singaporean general elections, 2 opposition candidates were elected to Parliament: Chiam See Tong in Potong Pasir, and J. B. Jeyaretnam in Anson.

== Constituencies ==
District	Polling Districts in 1984	Polling Districts in 1988	Total
Alexandra			
Aljunied			
Ang Mo Kio	AM01, YK04		
Anson	RM01		
Ayer Rajah			
Bedok			
Bo Wen	AM03 - AM04, KR02, YK05		
Boon Lay			
Boon Teck			
Braddell Heights	PL01		
Brickworks		BW01 - BW02	2
Bukit Batok			
Bukit Merah		BM01 - BM02	2
Bukit Panjang			
Bukit Timah			
Buona Vista			
Cairnhill			
Changi			
Changkat	KB06, TM05		
Cheng San	JK05		
Chong Boon	CS03		
Chua Chu Kang			
Clementi			
Delta		DL01 - DL02	2
Eunos	KB01 - KB02		
Fengshan	BD03, CH08, KC04		
Geylang Serai			
Geylang West			
Henderson		HS01 - HS02	2
Hong Kah	BL01 - BL02		
Jalan Besar			
Jalan Kayu			
Joo Chiat	KT01 - KT02		
Jurong			
Kaki Bukit			
Kallang			
Kampong Chai Chee			
Kampong Glam		KG01 - KG03	3
Kampong Kembangan			
Kampong Ubi			
Kebun Baru	KR01, KR03		
Khe Bong			
Kim Keat			
Kim Seng	BH01	KS01 - KS03	3
Kolam Ayer			
Kreta Ayer	HV01 - HV02, KA01 - KA02	KA01 - KA04	4
Kuo Chuan			
Leng Kee		LK01 - LK02	2
MacPherson			
Marine Parade			
Moulmein			
Mountbatten	KT01		
Nee Soon			
Pasir Panjang			
Paya Lebar	PG04		
Potong Pasir			
Punggol	PG01 - PG03		
Queenstown			
Radin Mas		RM01 - RM03	3
River Valley		RV01 - RV05	5
Rochore		RC01 - RC03	3
Sembawang			
Serangoon Gardens			
Siglap			
Tampines	KB02		
Tanah Merah			
Tanglin	CA04 - CA05		
Tanjong Pagar	KA03	TP01 - TP04	4
Teck Ghee	AM02, CB01		
Telok Ayer	HV01 - HV02	TA01 - TA04	4
Telok Blangah			
Thomson	KR04 - KR05		
Tiong Bahru	BH02	TG01 - TG05	5
Toa Payoh			
Ulu Pandan			
West Coast			
Whampoa			
Yio Chu Kang	YK01 - YK04		
Yuhua	BL02, BT04		
