= 1980 Singaporean general election =

- 23 December 1980

All 75 seats in Parliament 38 seats needed for a majority
- Registered: 1,290,426 (Note: 605,285 of the 1,290,426 voters were registered in uncontested constituencies, leaving 685,141 voters able to vote.)
- Turnout: 95.50% (▲0.42pp)
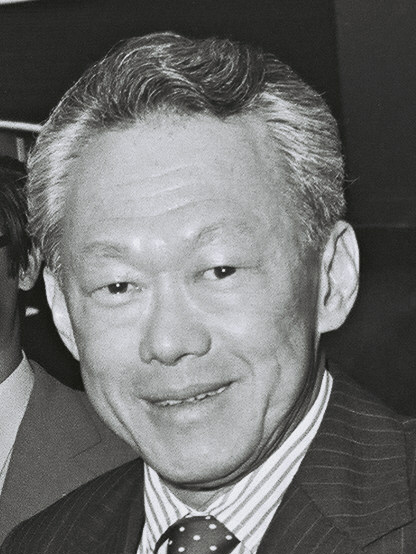
	First party
Leader	Lee Kuan Yew
Party	PAP
Leader's seat	Tanjong Pagar
Last election	74.09%, 69 seats
Seats won	75
Seat change	▲6
Popular vote	494,268
Percentage	77.66%
Swing	▲3.57pp
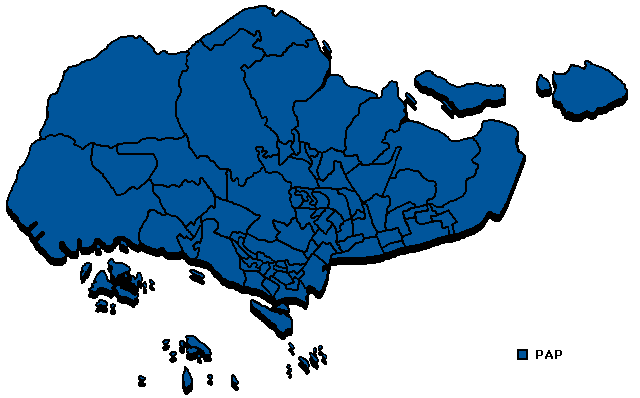
- Results by constituency
Prime Minister before election
Lee Kuan Yew
PAP
Prime Minister after election
Lee Kuan Yew
PAP

General elections were held in Singapore on 23 December 1980 to elect all 75 members of Parliament. They were the sixth general elections since the introduction of self-government in 1959 and the fourth since independence in 1965. The number of parliamentary seats increased from 69 to 75 following adjustments to electoral boundaries. Out of the 75 constituencies, 38 were contested while the remaining 37 were won uncontested by the People's Action Party (PAP). A total of 118 candidates stood for election, all of whom were fielded by political parties with no candidates running as independents.

The PAP, led by Prime Minister Lee Kuan Yew, secured a landslide victory by winning all 75 seats, marking the party's fourth consecutive clean sweep since 1968. The party obtained 77.66% of the valid votes cast, continuing to dominate the political landscape. Voter turnout was 95% in the contested constituencies, which amounted to 685,141 voters, or approximately half of the total electorate of 1,290,426. The other half of the electorate was not required to vote due to walkovers.

Seven opposition parties, among them the Workers' Party (WP), the United People's Front (UPF), the Barisan Sosialis (BS) and the newly formed Singapore Democratic Party (SDP), contested the elections but failed to secure any seats. In spite of their participation, the result affirmed the PAP's unbroken dominance in Parliament and extended its one-party rule.

== Background ==
In the years preceding the election, two rounds of by-elections were held in 1977 and 1979, following the vacating of two and seven seats respectively. The People's Action Party (PAP) won all of these contests, enabling nine new members to enter Parliament, including Devan Nair and Tony Tan, both of whom would later become Presidents of Singapore.

On 2 April, Phey Yew Kok, then-President of the National Trades Union Congress (NTUC), resigned his Boon Teck seat after being charged with misappropriation of trade union funds. He subsequently absconded to Thailand to evade bail, and no by-election was called as the parliamentary term was nearing its end. Phey remained a fugitive for 35 years before surrendering at the Singapore Embassy in Bangkok in 2015. Against this backdrop, the Singapore Democratic Party (SDP) was formally established on 8 September by independent candidate Chiam See Tong, who had contested at Cairnhill in 1976 and at Potong Pasir as part of the 1979 by-elections.

== Timeline ==
Date	Event
5 December	Dissolution of 4th Parliament
13 December	Nomination Day
23 December	Polling Day
3 February 1981	Opening of 5th Parliament

== MPs not standing for re-election ==
There were 12 PAP MPs who left politics in this election, including the more prominent figures Lim Kim San and Othman Wok.

MP	Party	Constituency	Elected in
Ahmad Haleem	PAP	Telok Blangah	1976
Ang Nam Piau	PAP	Thomson	1967
Ho Cheng Choon	PAP	Geylang East	1963
Lim Kim San	PAP	Cairnhill	1963
Ngeow Pack Hua	PAP	Boon Lay	1976
Ong Leong Boon	PAP	Kim Seng	1972
Othman Wok	PAP	Pasir Panjang	1963
Rahmat Kenap	PAP	Geylang Serai	1963
Sha'ari Tadin	PAP	Bedok	1968
Tan Cheng San	PAP	Paya Lebar	1976
Tan Eng Liang	PAP	River Valley	1972
Ya'acob Mohamed	PAP	Kampong Ubi	1959

== New candidates ==
There were 38 new candidates in this election (18 were from the PAP), which include future ministers Lee Yock Suan, Lim Boon Heng, Tay Eng Soon, S. Jayakumar and Yeo Ning Hong, alongside prominent backbencher Tan Cheng Bock, who would later emerge as a candidate in the 2011 Singaporean presidential election and one of the founders of the Progress Singapore Party (PSP) in 2019.

New candidate	Party	Constituency
Abbas Abu Amin	PAP	Pasir Panjang
Ahmad Salim	UPF	Kampong Ubi
Atim Ismail	UPF	Kaki Bukit
S. Chandra Das	PAP	Chong Boon
Chau Sik Ting	PAP	Thomson
Choong Chee Kwong	WP	Cheng San
Chua Nguan Key	UF	Punggol
Fok Tai Loy	SDP	Cairnhill
Goh Chee Wee	PAP	Boon Lay
Ibrahim Ariff	PKMS	Kaki Bukit
M. K. A. Jabbar	PAP	Radin Mas
Jamal Idris	PKMS	Kampong Kembangan
Jantan Taib	UPF	Kebun Baru
S. Jayakumar	PAP	Bedok
Kasim Ibrahim	UPF	Tampines
Lau Ping Sum	PAP	Yio Chu Kang
Lee Mun Hung	UPF	Tanjong Pagar
Lee Yock Suan	PAP	Cheng San
Leong Yew Thong	UF	Kampong Chai Chee
Liew Kok Pun	PAP	Boon Teck
Lim Boon Heng	PAP	Kebun Baru
Long Abdullah	UPF	Geylang West
Mohd Sani	UPF	Bukit Panjang
S. Munjeet	UPF	Clementi
Othman Haron Eusofe	PAP	Geylang Serai
L. S. Piaro	UPF	Yio Chu Kang
Saidi Shariff	PAP	Kaki Bukit
R. G. Scharenguivel	WP	Siglap
Soon Kia Seng	SDP	Joo Chiat
A. R. Suib	SJP	Ayer Rajah
Tan Chee Kien	UF	Boon Lay
Tan Cheng Bock	PAP	Ayer Rajah
Tay Eng Soon	PAP	River Valley
Thomas Anthony Tay	UPF	Bedok
Wan Hussin Zoohri	PAP	Kampong Ubi
Wan Soon Bee	PAP	West Coast
Wong Kwei Chong	PAP	Cairnhill
Yeo Ning Hong	PAP	Kim Seng

== Campaign ==
A total of 43 opposition candidates contested 38 constituencies, representing roughly half of the available seats, with the United People's Front fielding the largest number at 14. This election was the first instance, and one of only three in Singapore's history, with the others being the 2006 and 2011, in which no candidates stood as independents. Key issues during the campaign included the school streaming system and the fraud involving Phey Yew Kok, both of which attracted significant public attention.

=== 1980 SIAPA strike ===
Whoever governs Singapore must have that iron in him, or give it up! This is not a game of cards. This is your life and mine. I've spent a whole lifetime building this. And as long as I'm in charge, nobody is going to knock it down.

— Lee on 19 December 1980 at an election rally at Fullerton Square.

Earlier that year, pilots and flight engineers from the Singapore Airlines Pilots Association (SIAPA) began a work-to-rule to demand higher wages of up to 30%, causing major flight disruptions. Prime Minister Lee Kuan Yew viewed the move as a threat to the nation's economic survival and gave the workers a public ultimatum to return to normalcy, and that he would rather restart the airline entirely instead of giving in to their demands. On 1 December, Lee personally met the leaders behind the industrial action at the Istana.

On 19 December, he reiterated this during an election rally held in a heavy downpour at Fullerton Square. Lee addressed the crisis by telling the crowd that governing Singapore required "iron" and his absolute refusal to let the country's progress be destroyed. The pilots eventually backed down, and fifteen union leaders were subsequently charged and convicted for their roles. It was deemed as an illegal act for failing to ballot members to start the industrial action. SIAPA was de-registered shortly after and later reformed as the Air Line Pilots' Association Singapore (ALPA–S), and Lee's actions and his speech became one of the most defining moments of his premiership.

=== Party political broadcasts ===
This election was the first to feature party political broadcasts, a televised programme hosted by the Singapore Broadcasting Corporation (SBC, now Mediacorp) in which political parties fielding at least six candidates under a recognised party symbol were eligible for airtime on free-to-air radio and television. The amount of airtime allocated depended on the number of candidates a party fielded, with a minimum of two minutes for a party with six candidates. The order of presentation was determined by the party with the fewest seats first, and if multiple parties had the same number of seats, the order was decided by lot.

Prior to a broadcast, participating parties were required to submit five copies of their manifestos to SBC. Two broadcasts were held on 17 and 22 December. The United Front and the Workers' Party (WP), both fielding eight candidates, presented first with three minutes each. The United People's Front (UPF), fielding 14 candidates with three and a half minutes, presented third. The People's Action Party (PAP), contesting all 75 seats, presented last with a twelve-minute broadcast.

== Constituencies ==
Similar to previous elections, constituencies were either dissolved or created due to population changes. The constituencies which saw changes were as follows:

Constituency	Changes
New Constituencies
Ayer Rajah; Clementi; West Coast	Carved from Bukit Timah
Cheng San; Chong Boon	Carved from Serangoon Gardens
Kaki Bukit	Carved from Kampong Chai Chee
Kebun Baru; Yio Chu Kang	Carved from Ang Mo Kio
Tanah Merah	Carved from Bedok and Changi
Defunct Constituencies
Farrer Park	Ward was absorbed to Moulmein and Cairnhill
Geylang East	Ward was absorbed to Geylang Serai
Upper Serangoon	Ward was absorbed to Serangoon Gardens and Paya Lebar

== Results ==
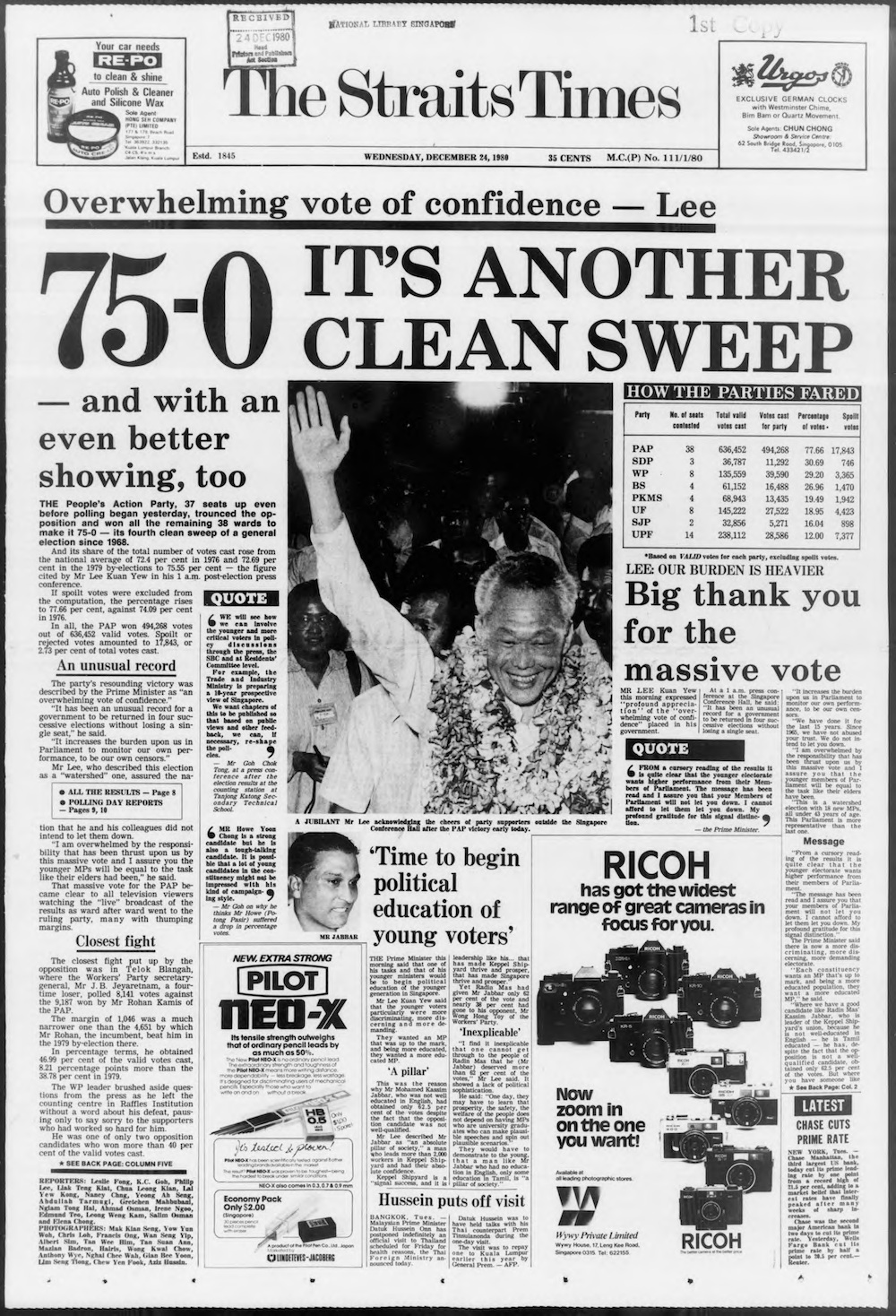
The front page of The Straits Times on 24 December

The result for Lee Kuan Yew's seat of Tanjong Pagar recorded the highest vote share for the fourth consecutive election, achieving 92.74%, its peak since 1968 when it reached 94.34%. Opposition leaders from the Workers' Party (WP) and the Singapore Democratic Party (SDP), J. B. Jeyaretnam and Chiam See Tong, who contested Telok Blangah and Potong Pasir respectively, recorded the two narrowest winning margins for the governing PAP, 53.02% to 46.98% and 59.05% to 40.95%. Eight candidates forfeited their $1,500 election deposits, the highest number since 1972. At Kebun Baru and Tanjong Pagar, all opposing candidates lost their deposits in multi-cornered contests, a feat that would not be repeated until 2025.

Popular vote
1. PAP (77.7%)
2. WP (6.22%)
3. UPF (4.49%)
4. UF (4.32%)
5. BS (2.59%)
6. Others (4.71%)
Seats won
1. 37 seats (PAP; uncontested) (49.3%)
2. 38 seats (PAP; contested) (50.7%)

Party	Votes	%	+/–	Seats	+/–
People's Action Party	494,268	77.66	+3.57	75	+6
Workers' Party	39,590	6.22	–5.33	0	0
United People's Front	28,586	4.49	+2.70	0	0
United Front	27,522	4.32	–2.38	0	0
Barisan Sosialis	16,488	2.59	–0.60	0	0
Pertubuhan Kebangsaan Melayu Singapura	13,435	2.11	+0.95	0	0
Singapore Democratic Party	11,292	1.77	New	0	New
Singapore Justice Party	5,271	0.83	+0.18	0	0
Total	636,452	100.00	–	75	+6
Valid votes	636,452	97.27			
Invalid/blank votes	17,843	2.73			
Total votes	654,295	100.00			
Registered voters/turnout	1,290,426	95.50			
Source: Nohlen et al., Singapore Elections

Opposition parties contested vote
Party	Votes
SDP	30.70%
WP	29.20%
BS	26.96%
PKMS	19.49%
SUF	18.95%
SJP	16.04%
UPF	12.01%

=== By constituency ===
Constituency	Electorate	Party	Candidate	Votes	%
Alexandra	18,163	People's Action Party	Tan Soo Khoon	Unopposed	
Aljunied	17,017	People's Action Party	Chin Harn Tong	13,313	84.59
Aljunied	17,017	United Front	Sim Peng Kim	2,425	15.41
Ang Mo Kio	22,542	People's Action Party	Yeo Toon Chia	17,436	81.99
Ang Mo Kio	22,542	United People's Front	Ang Bee Lian	3,830	18.01
Anson	15,077	People's Action Party	Devan Nair	11,564	84.10
Anson	15,077	United People's Front	Santhi Thevar	2,187	15.90
Ayer Rajah	15,787	People's Action Party	Tan Cheng Bock	12,400	83.39
Ayer Rajah	15,787	Singapore Justice Party	A. R. Suib	2,470	16.61
Bedok	20,852	People's Action Party	S. Jayakumar	14,691	75.03
Bedok	20,852	Pertubuhan Kebangsaan Melayu Singapura	Abdul Rahman Mohamed Zin	3,527	18.01
Bedok	20,852	United People's Front	Thomas Anthony Tay	1,362	6.96
Boon Lay	21,317	People's Action Party	Goh Chee Wee	15,005	74.19
Boon Lay	21,317	United Front	Tan Chee Kien	5,220	25.81
Boon Teck	18,705	People's Action Party	Liew Kok Pun	11,917	68.14
Boon Teck	18,705	Barisan Sosialis	Lee Siew Choh	5,571	31.86
Braddell Heights	14,519	People's Action Party	Lee Khoon Choy	Unopposed	
Brickworks	13,054	People's Action Party	Ahmad Mattar	Unopposed	
Bukit Batok	18,275	People's Action Party	Chai Chong Yii	Unopposed	
Bukit Ho Swee	12,435	People's Action Party	Seah Mui Kok	Unopposed	
Bukit Merah	19,046	People's Action Party	Lim Chee Onn	Unopposed	
Bukit Panjang	23,305	People's Action Party	Lee Yiok Seng	18,510	87.03
Bukit Panjang	23,305	United People's Front	Mohd Sani	2,759	12.97
Bukit Timah	15,334	People's Action Party	Chor Yeok Eng	Unopposed	
Buona Vista	17,287	People's Action Party	Ang Kok Peng	Unopposed	
Cairnhill	18,133	People's Action Party	Wong Kwei Cheong	11,444	71.79
Cairnhill	18,133	Singapore Democratic Party	Fok Tai Loy	4,498	28.21
Changi	25,464	People's Action Party	Teo Chong Tee	Unopposed	
Cheng San	17,044	People's Action Party	Lee Yock Suan	12,312	75.89
Cheng San	17,044	Workers' Party	Choong Chee Kwong	3,911	24.11
Chong Boon	13,877	People's Action Party	S. Chandra Das	Unopposed	
Chua Chu Kang	22,363	People's Action Party	Tang See Chim	Unopposed	
Clementi	15,129	People's Action Party	Bernard Chen	12,162	85.42
Clementi	15,129	United People's Front	S. Munjeet	2,076	14.58
Delta	14,830	People's Action Party	Yeo Choo Kok	Unopposed	
Geylang Serai	19,962	People's Action Party	Othman Haron Eusofe	13,195	71.99
Geylang Serai	19,962	United Front	Seow Khee Leng	5,134	28.01
Geylang West	22,298	People's Action Party	Teh Cheang Wan	17,585	85.45
Geylang West	22,298	United People's Front	Long Abdullah	2,994	14.55
Havelock	12,524	People's Action Party	Hon Sui Sen	Unopposed	
Henderson	18,353	People's Action Party	Lai Tha Chai	13,363	77.42
Henderson	18,353	Workers' Party	Lim Kang Chew	3,897	22.58
Jalan Besar	15,058	People's Action Party	Chan Chee Seng	Unopposed	
Jalan Kayu	23,766	People's Action Party	Hwang Soo Jin	15,275	69.02
Jalan Kayu	23,766	Workers' Party	M. P. D. Nair	6,855	30.98
Joo Chiat	12,805	People's Action Party	Yeoh Ghim Seng	8,542	74.18
Joo Chiat	12,805	Singapore Democratic Party	Soon Kia Seng	2,973	25.82
Jurong	18,658	People's Action Party	Ho Kah Leong	Unopposed	
Kaki Bukit	21,318	People's Action Party	Saidi Shariff	14,550	72.32
Kaki Bukit	21,318	Pertubuhan Kebangsaan Melayu Singapura	Ibrahim Ariff	4,072	20.24
Kaki Bukit	21,318	United People's Front	Atim Ismail	1,496	7.44
Kallang	16,222	People's Action Party	S. Dhanabalan	Unopposed	
Kampong Chai Chee	20,237	People's Action Party	Fong Sip Chee	15,421	81.22
Kampong Chai Chee	20,237	United Front	Leong Yew Thong	3,565	18.78
Kampong Glam	17,241	People's Action Party	S. Rajaratnam	Unopposed	
Kampong Kembangan	15,854	People's Action Party	Mansor Sukaimi	11,194	78.74
Kampong Kembangan	15,854	Pertubuhan Kebangsaan Melayu Singapura	Jamal Idris	3,023	21.26
Kampong Ubi	16,250	People's Action Party	Wan Hussin Zoohri	11,102	73.87
Kampong Ubi	16,250	Pertubuhan Kebangsaan Melayu Singapura	Sahid Sahooman	2,813	18.72
Kampong Ubi	16,250	United People's Front	Ahmad Salim	1,113	7.41
Katong	12,041	People's Action Party	Joseph Francis Conceicao	Unopposed	
Kebun Baru	17,709	People's Action Party	Lim Boon Heng	13,632	82.83
Kebun Baru	17,709	United Front	Lim Tiong Hock	1,883	11.44
Kebun Baru	17,709	United People's Front	Jantan Taib	943	5.73
Khe Bong	15,425	People's Action Party	Ho See Beng	10,497	72.42
Khe Bong	15,425	Barisan Sosialis	Sim Say Chuan	3,998	27.58
Kim Keat	20,781	People's Action Party	Ong Teng Cheong	Unopposed	
Kim Seng	14,734	People's Action Party	Yeo Ning Hong	11,109	80.55
Kim Seng	14,734	Workers' Party	Seow Yong Chew	2,682	19.45
Kolam Ayer	22,775	People's Action Party	Sidek Saniff	16,995	80.35
Kolam Ayer	22,775	United Front	Mohamed Mansor Rahman	4,155	19.65
Kreta Ayer	11,973	People's Action Party	Goh Keng Swee	Unopposed	
Kuo Chuan	17,471	People's Action Party	P. Selvadurai	12,378	75.92
Kuo Chuan	17,471	Barisan Sosialis	Sim Chit Giak	3,925	24.08
Leng Kee	15,166	People's Action Party	Ow Chin Hock	Unopposed	
MacPherson	18,997	People's Action Party	Chua Sian Chin	15,280	86.89
MacPherson	18,997	United People's Front	Darus Shariff	2,306	13.11
Marine Parade	21,903	People's Action Party	Goh Chok Tong	Unopposed	
Moulmein	16,999	People's Action Party	Lawrence Sia	Unopposed	
Mountbatten	14,045	People's Action Party	Eugene Yap	Unopposed	
Nee Soon	16,817	People's Action Party	Koh Lip Lin	Unopposed	
Pasir Panjang	17,743	People's Action Party	Abbas Abu Amin	11,824	72.57
Pasir Panjang	17,743	Workers' Party	Zainul Abiddin Mohd Shah	4,470	27.43
Paya Lebar	11,666	People's Action Party	Sia Kah Hui	Unopposed	
Potong Pasir	10,068	People's Action Party	Howe Yoon Chong	5,509	59.05
Potong Pasir	10,068	Singapore Democratic Party	Chiam See Tong	3,821	40.95
Punggol	23,333	People's Action Party	Ng Kah Ting	17,103	78.86
Punggol	23,333	United Front	Chua Nguan Key	4,585	21.14
Queenstown	17,450	People's Action Party	Jek Yeun Thong	Unopposed	
Radin Mas	18,854	People's Action Party	M. K. A. Jabbar	11,335	64.07
Radin Mas	18,854	Workers' Party	Wong Hong Toy	6,356	35.93
River Valley	14,950	People's Action Party	Tay Eng Soon	Unopposed	
Rochore	14,705	People's Action Party	Toh Chin Chye	Unopposed	
Sembawang	17,785	People's Action Party	Tony Tan	13,415	81.55
Sembawang	17,785	United People's Front	Harbans Singh	3,035	18.45
Serangoon Gardens	16,973	People's Action Party	Lau Teik Soon	Unopposed	
Siglap	16,675	People's Action Party	Abdul Rahim Ishak	11,564	77.91
Siglap	16,675	Workers' Party	R. G. Scharenguivel	3,278	22.09
Tampines	18,982	People's Action Party	Phua Bah Lee	15,065	85.92
Tampines	18,982	United People's Front	Kasim Ibrahim	2,469	14.08
Tanah Merah	15,711	People's Action Party	Lee Chiaw Meng	Unopposed	
Tanglin	13,332	People's Action Party	E. W. Barker	Unopposed	
Tanjong Pagar	13,765	People's Action Party	Lee Kuan Yew	11,730	92.74
Tanjong Pagar	13,765	United Front	Johnny Wee	555	4.39
Tanjong Pagar	13,765	United People's Front	Lee Mun Hung	363	2.87
Telok Ayer	12,381	People's Action Party	Ong Pang Boon	Unopposed	
Telok Blangah	18,314	People's Action Party	Rohan Kamis	9,187	53.02
Telok Blangah	18,314	Workers' Party	J. B. Jeyaratnam	8,141	46.98
Thomson	14,786	People's Action Party	Chau Sik Ting	Unopposed	
Tiong Bahru	18,077	People's Action Party	Ch'ng Jit Koon	Unopposed	
Toa Payoh	13,799	People's Action Party	Eric Cheong	9,872	76.73
Toa Payoh	13,799	Barisan Sosialis	Ng Ho	2,994	23.27
Ulu Pandan	22,048	People's Action Party	Chiang Hai Ding	Unopposed	
West Coast	18,949	People's Action Party	Wan Soon Bee	15,185	84.43
West Coast	18,949	Singapore Justice Party	M. Ramasamy	2,801	15.57
Whampoa	19,131	People's Action Party	Augustine Tan	Unopposed	
Yio Chu Kang	14,012	People's Action Party	Lau Ping Sum	11,607	87.53
Yio Chu Kang	14,012	United People's Front	L. S. Piaro	1,653	12.47
Source: ELD
