= Yio Chu Kang Single Member Constituency (disambiguation) =

The Yio Chu Kang Single Member Constituency is an electoral division in Ang Mo Kio, Singapore. It was created in 2020.

Yio Chu Kang Single Member Constituency or Yio Chu Kang Constituency may also refer to:

- Yio Chu Kang Single Member Constituency (1980 – 1991)
- Yio Chu Kang Single Member Constituency (2006 – 2011)
