= Bo Wen Constituency =

Former electoral division in Singapore

Coordinates: 1.367°N 103.841°E

Bo Wen
- Former Single Member constituency for the Parliament of Singapore
- Region: Singapore

Former constituency
- Created: 1984
- Abolished: 1988
- Seats: 1
- Member: Constituency Abolished
- Replaced by: Ang Mo Kio; Kebun Baru; Yio Chu Kang

Bo Wen Constituency was a constituency in Singapore. It existed from 1984 to 1988. S. Vasoo was the constituency's Member of parliament (MP) until he shifted to Radin Mas in 1988. It absorbed part of Ang Mo Kio, Kebun Baru, and Yio Chu Kang constituencies.

== History ==
In 1988, the constituency was dissolved following the establishment of Group representation constituency (GRC) and Single Member Constituency (SMC).

== Member of Parliament ==
Year	Member	Party
Formation
1984	S Vasoo	PAP
Constituency abolished (1988)

== Electoral results ==
Note: The Elections Department does not include rejected votes when calculating the vote shares of candidates. Hence, all candidates' vote shares will total to 100% at any given election (may not appear so in multi-way contests due to rounding).

General Election 1984
Party	Candidate	Votes	%
PAP	S Vasoo	10,299	74.70
UPF	Sh Ahmad Salim	3,488	25.30
Majority		6,811	49.40
Total valid votes		13,787	96.42
Rejected ballots		512	3.58
Turnout		14,299	96.77
Registered electors		14,777	
PAP win (new seat)			
