= Kebun Baru Single Member Constituency (1980 – 1991) =

Electoral division in Singapore

Kebun Baru
- Former single-member constituency for the Parliament of Singapore
- Region: North-East Region, Singapore
- Electorate: 22,515

Former constituency
- Created: 1980; 46 years ago
- Abolished: 1991; 35 years ago
- Seats: 1
- Party: People's Action Party
- Member: Lim Boon Heng
- Town Council: Ang Mo Kio
- Created from: Ang Mo Kio Constituency
- Merged to: Ang Mo Kio GRC

The Kebun Baru Single Member Constituency (Note: Malay: Kawasan Undi Perseorangan Kebun Baru; Chinese: 哥本峇鲁单选区; Tamil: கெபுன் பாரு தனித்தொகுதி) was a single-member constituency (SMC) situated in north-eastern Singapore. It was established in 1980 and was merged into Ang Mo Kio Group Representation Constituency (GRC) in 1991. The last Member of Parliament (MP) for the constituency was Lim Boon Heng from the People's Action Party (PAP).

== Electoral history ==
=== Creation ===
Kebun Baru Constituency was carved from Ang Mo Kio Constituency (Note: Abolished in 1991 as Ang Mo Kio SMC.) prior to the 1980 general election. It was represented by Lim Boon Heng from the PAP throughout its first continuous period (11 years) of existence.

At the 1988 general election, following the introduction of group representation constituencies (GRCs), the constituency was renamed Kebun Baru SMC.

Kebun Baru SMC was merged into the newly established Ang Mo Kio GRC prior to the 1991 general election.

== Member of Parliament ==
Year	Member	Party
Formation
1980	Lim Boon Heng	PAP
1984	Lim Boon Heng	PAP
1988	Lim Boon Heng	PAP
Constituency abolished (1991)

== Electoral results ==
Note: The Elections Department does not include rejected votes when calculating the vote shares of candidates. Hence, all candidates' vote shares will total to 100% at any given election (may not appear so in multi-way contests due to rounding).

=== Elections in 1980s ===
General Election 1980
Party	Candidate	Votes	%
PAP	Lim Boon Heng	13,632	82.83
UF	Lim Tiong Hock	1,883	11.44
UPF	Jantan B Taib	943	5.73
Majority		11,749	71.39
Total valid votes		16,458	96.99
Rejected ballots		511	3.01
Turnout		16,969	95.82
Registered electors		17,709	
PAP win (new seat)			

General Election 1984
Party	Candidate	Votes	%	±%
PAP	Lim Boon Heng	12,311	75.84	▼6.99
UPF	Harbans Singh	3,921	24.16	▲18.43
Majority		8.390	51.68	▼19.71
Total valid votes		16,232	95.77	▼1.22
Rejected ballots		717	4.23	▲1.22
Turnout		16,949	96.62	▲0.80
Registered electors		17,542		▼0.94
PAP hold		Swing	▼6.99	

General Election 1988
Party	Candidate	Votes	%	±%
PAP	Lim Boon Heng	15,734	75.36	▼0.48
NSP	Mohamed Affendy bin Abdul Rahim	5,145	24.64	N/A
Majority		10,589	50.72	▼0.96
Total valid votes		20,879	97.37	▲1.60
Rejected ballots		564	2.63	▼1.60
Turnout		21,443	95.24	▼1.38
Registered electors		22,515		▲28.35
PAP hold		Swing	▼0.48	
