= Yio Chu Kang Single Member Constituency (2006 – 2011) =

Former electoral division in Singapore

Yio Chu Kang
- Former single-member constituency for the Parliament of Singapore
- Region: North-East Region, Singapore

Former constituency
- Created: 2006; 20 years ago
- Abolished: 2011; 15 years ago
- Seats: 1
- Party: People's Action Party
- Member: Seng Han Thong
- Town Council: Ang Mo Kio
- Merged to: Ang Mo Kio GRC (2011)

The Yio Chu Kang Single Member Constituency (Note: Malay: Kawasan Undi Perseorangan Yio Chu Kang; Chinese: 杨厝港单选区; Tamil: இயோ சூ காங் தனித்தொகுதி) was a single-member constituency (SMC) situated in north-eastern Singapore. It was established in 2006 and was merged into Ang Mo Kio Group Representation Constituency (GRC) in 2011. The last Member of Parliament (MP) for the constituency was Seng Han Thong from the People's Action Party (PAP).

== History ==
In 2006, prior to the 2006 Singaporean general election, Yio Chu Kang SMC was recreated by carving the Yio Chu Kang division out from Ang Mo Kio GRC. PAP's candidate Seng Han Thong contested the SMC with Yip Yew Weng of the Singapore Democratic Alliance and won the election with 68.28 percent of the votes.

In 2011, Seng became embroiled in a racism controversy when he posted comments online regarding the transit crisis in Singapore. He said on Blog TV.SG that "I noticed that the PR mentioned that some of the staff, because they are Malays, they are Indians, they can't converse in English well enough".

In 2011, prior to the 2011 Singaporean general election, Yio Chu Kang SMC was merged into Ang Mo Kio GRC again.

== Member of Parliament ==
Year	Member	Party
Formation
2006	Seng Han Thong	PAP
Constituency abolished (2011)

== Electoral results ==
Note: The Elections Department does not include rejected votes when calculating the vote shares of candidates. Hence, all candidates' vote shares will total to 100% at any given election (may not appear so in multi-way contests due to rounding).

=== Elections in 2000s ===
General Election 2006
Party	Candidate	Votes	%
PAP	Seng Han Thong	15,726	68.28
SDA	Yip Yew Weng	7,307	31.72
Majority		8,419	36.56
Turnout		23,524	93.8
PAP win (new seat)			
