= Seng Han Thong =

Singaporean politician

- 成汉通

Member of the Singapore Parliament for Ang Mo Kio GRC
- In office 7 May 2011 – 25 August 2015
- Preceded by: PAP held
- Succeeded by: PAP held
- Majority: 62,826 (38.66)

Member of the Singapore Parliament for Yio Chu Kang SMC
- In office 6 May 2006 – 19 April 2011
- Preceded by: Constituency established
- Succeeded by: Constituency abolished

Member of the Singapore Parliament for Ang Mo Kio GRC
- In office 23 December 1996 – 20 April 2006
- Preceded by: PAP held
- Succeeded by: PAP held
- Majority: 1996: N/A (walkover); 2001: N/A (walkover)

Personal details
- Born: Seng Han Thong; 22 April 1950 (age 76) Colony of Singapore
- Party: People's Action Party
- Education: National University of Singapore, Brunel University
- Profession: Politician

Seng Han Thong (Note: Chinese: 成汉通; Pe̍h-ōe-jī: Seng Hàn-thong; pinyin: Chéng Hàntōng) (born 22 April 1950) is a Singaporean former politician. A member of the governing People's Action Party (PAP), he was the Member of Parliament (MP) for the Yio Chu Kang division of Ang Mo Kio Group Representation Constituency (GRC) between 1997 and 2006, Yio Chu Kang Single Member Constituency (SMC) between 2006 and 2011, and again the Yio Chu Kang division of Ang Mo Kio GRC between 2011 and 2015.

== Education ==
Seng attended Tuan Mong High School (now Ngee Ann Secondary School), graduating in 1967. He holds a master's degree in Public Administration and Management from the Lee Kuan Yew School of Public Policy, National University of Singapore and a Master of Business Administration from the Henley Business School, Brunel University.

== Career ==
Afterwards, he held various jobs including as a sales representative for a watch company and a certified interpreter in the judicial system of Singapore. In 1974, he began a career in journalism, starting as a reporter for the Nanyang Siang Pau, then moving to the Lianhe Zaobao in 1982. From 1983 to 1984, he attended a management diploma course at the Singapore Institute of Management, while rising through the ranks at his new company. While studying for an MBA between 1990 and 1993 at Brunel University in London, he became deputy chief editor of the Lianhe Zaobao in 1992. He became the general manager of Singapore Press Holdings' Chinese newspaper division in 1996.

=== Political career ===
Seng was first elected to parliament in 1997, representing the Ang Mo Kio GRC; he was returned to his seat in 2001, and then in 2006 was elected to represent the Yio Chu Kang SMC.

In May 2006, Seng was attacked by a constituent of his, a 74-year-old disgruntled former taxi driver who felt that Seng was not taking any action to help him regain his lost taxi licence. The man later made a public apology to Seng, and the charges were dropped.

In January 2009, Seng suffered another attack by one of his constituents; a 70-year-old man set him on fire by pouring paint thinner on his back and then igniting him with a cigarette lighter. The man was believed to be mentally ill. Seng suffered burns to roughly 15 percent of his body, and received treatment at Singapore General Hospital. He took time off to recover from his injuries, and resumed his duties in July 2009.

In 2011, Seng became embroiled in a racism controversy when he posted comments online regarding the transit crisis in Singapore. He said on Blog TV.SG that "I noticed that the PR mentioned that some of the staff, because they are Malays, they are Indians, they can't converse in English well enough".

Seng retired from politics after August 2015.

== Notes ==
Parliament of Singapore
Preceded by Yeo Toon Chia; Umar Abdul Hamid; Lee Hsien Loong; Lau Ping Sum	Member of Parliament for Ang Mo Ko GRC; 1997–2006; Served alongside: (1997 – 2001): Tang Guan Seng, Inderjit Singh, Tan Boon Wan and Lee Hsien Loong (2001 - 2006): Balaji Sadasivan, Inderjit Singh, Wee Siew Kim, Tan Boon Wan and Lee Hsien Loong	Succeeded by Balaji Sadasivan; Inderjit Singh; Wee Siew Kim; Lee Bee Wah; Lam Pin Min; Lee Hsien Loong
New constituency	Member of Parliament for Yio Chu Kang SMC; 2006–2011	Constituency abolished
