= Yeo Toon Chia =

Singaporean politician

- 杨敦清

Member of Parliament for Ang Mo Kio GRC
- In office 21 August 1991 – 2 January 1997
- Preceded by: Constituency established
- Succeeded by: PAP held
- Majority: N/A (walkover)

Member of Parliament for Ang Mo Kio Single Member Constituency
- In office 13 December 1976 – 31 August 1991
- Preceded by: Constituency established
- Succeeded by: Constituency abolished
- Majority: 1976: N/A (walkover); 1980: 9,483 (63.98%); 1984: 6,198 (45.50%); 1988: 6,321 (30.98%)

Member of Parliament for Kampong Kapor Constituency
- In office 18 April 1970 – 23 December 1976
- Preceded by: Lim Cheng Lock
- Succeeded by: Constituency abolished
- Majority: 1970: 1972:

Personal details
- Born: Yeo Toon Chia; 14 May 1941 (age 85) Singapore, Straits Settlements
- Party: People's Action Party
- Children: 2
- Education: Tuan Mong High School; Singapore Polytechnic
- Profession: Politician
- Awards: Meritorious Service Star Award, 2019

Yeo Toon Chia (Note: Chinese: 杨敦清; Pe̍h-ōe-jī: Iôⁿ Tun-chhiaⁿ; pinyin: Yáng Dūnqīng) (born 14 May 1941) is a Singaporean former politician. A member of the governing People's Action Party (PAP), he was the Member of Parliament (MP) representing the Kampong Kapor Single Member Constituency from 1970 to 1976, the Ang Mo Kio Single Member Constituency from 1976 to 1991, and the Ang Mo Kio Group Representation Constituency representing the Ang Mo Kio division from 1991 to 1997.

== Early life ==
Yeo Toon Chia was born in Singapore in 1941. He completed his secondary education at Tuan Mong High School. From 1964 to 1968 he studied at Singapore Polytechnic, graduating in 1969 with a diploma in land surveying. After graduating from his studies, he worked as a technical officer in Jurong Town Corporation, then became director of a chemicals company.

== Career ==
Yeo joined the People's Action Party (PAP) in 1963. He was first elected to parliament for Kampong Kapor Constituency in the 1970 Singaporean by-elections, beating Chng Boon Eng of the United National Front with 62.4% of the vote to Chng's 37.6%.

In the 1972 Singaporean general election, Yeo faced Chng again in a rematch for Kampong Kapor Constituency; he won with 73.15% of the vote to Chng's 26.85%.

In the 1976 Singaporean general election, Yeo was transferred to the newly created ward of Ang Mo Kio Constituency to contest the elections there. He became Ang Mo Kio's first MP as one of sixteen candidates to be returned unopposed on Nomination Day. Yeo would remain as an MP for Ang Mo Kio for the rest of his career.

In the 1980 Singaporean general election, Yeo contested for the Ang Mo Kio Constituency again, against Ang Bee Lian of the United People's Front. Yeo was re-elected as the MP for Ang Mo Kio, beating Ang's 18.01% with 81.99% of the vote.

At the 1984 Singaporean general election, Yeo faced Ang again for the Ang Mo Kio Constituency. Yeo was once again re-elected with 72.75% of the vote to Ang's 27.25%.

During the 1988 Singaporean general election, Yeo faced the National Solidarity Party's Ong Kah Seng in a contest for Ang Mo Kio Constituency, now called Ang Mo Kio Single Member Constituency (SMC) after electoral reforms that year. Yeo was re-elected after bettering Ang's 34.51% of the vote with his 65.49%. The following year, Yeo became the first chairman of Ang Mo Kio Town Council, a position he served until 1995.

In the 1991 Singaporean general election, Ang Mo Kio SMC was merged with Kebun Baru SMC, Nee Soon South SMC, Teck Ghee SMC and Yio Chu Kang SMC to form Ang Mo Kio Group Representation Constituency (GRC). Yeo contested for the Ang Mo Kio division of the Ang Mo Kio Group Representation Constituency together with Lee Hsien Loong, Lau Ping Sum and Umar Abdul Hamid. They were elected unopposed on Nomination Day. Yeo retired as an MP in 1997.

In 2019, Yeo was awarded the PAP's Meritorious Service Star at the PAP65 Awards and Convention.

== Notes ==
Parliament of Singapore
Preceded by Lim Cheng Lock	Member of Parliament for Kampong Kapor Constituency; 1970 – 1976	Constituency abolished
New constituency	Member of Parliament for Ang Mo Kio Constituency; 1976 – 1991	Constituency abolished
New constituency	Member of Parliament for Ang Mo Kio GRC; 1991 – 1997; Served alongside: Umar Abdul Hamid, Lee Hsien Loong, Lau Ping Sum	Succeeded by Tang Guan Seng; Inderjit Singh; Tan Boon Wan; Lee Hsien Loong; Seng Han Thong
