= J. B. Jeyaretnam =

Singaporean politician

- ஜே. பி. ஜெயரத்தினம்
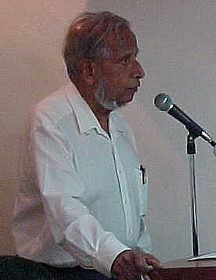
- Jeyaretnam in 2005

5th Leader of the Opposition (Note: De facto, not an official position in parliamentary proceedings.)
- In office 22 December 1981 – 10 November 1986
- Prime Minister: Lee Kuan Yew
- Preceded by: Chia Thye Poh
- Succeeded by: Chiam See Tong

6th Secretary-General of the Workers' Party
- In office July 1971 – 27 May 2001
- Preceded by: Sum Choon Heng
- Succeeded by: Low Thia Khiang

Non-Constituency Member of the 9th Parliament of Singapore
- In office 14 January 1997 – 23 July 2001
- Preceded by: Lee Siew Choh (until 1991)
- Succeeded by: Steve Chia

1st Secretary-General of the Reform Party
- In office 18 June 2008 – 30 September 2008
- Chairman: Ng Teck Siong
- Preceded by: Position established
- Succeeded by: Kenneth Jeyaretnam

Member of the Singapore Parliament for Anson Constituency
- In office 31 October 1981 – 10 November 1986
- Preceded by: Devan Nair (PAP)
- Succeeded by: Constituency abolished
- Majority: 1981: 653 (4.83%); 1984: 2,376 (13.6%)

Personal details
- Born: Joshua Benjamin Jeyaretnam; 5 January 1926 Jaffna, British Ceylon
- Died: 30 September 2008 (aged 82) Singapore
- Cause of death: Heart failure
- Other political affiliations: Workers' Party (1971–2001); Reform Party (2008—2009)
- Spouse: Margaret Cynthia Walker (m. 1957; died 1980)
- Children: Kenneth Jeyaretnam (son); Philip Jeyaretnam (son)
- Education: University College London (LLB)
- Profession: Politician; lawyer
- Nickname: "Tiger of Anson"

Joshua Benjamin Jeyaretnam (Note: Tamil: ஜோசுவா பெஞ்சமின் ஜெயரத்தினம், romanized: Jōcuvā Peñcamiṉ Jeyarattiṉam) (5 January 1926 – 30 September 2008) was a Singaporean politician and lawyer who served as secretary-general of the opposition Workers' Party from 1971 to 2001 and was the de facto Leader of the Opposition between 1981 and 1986. He was also an elected Member of Parliament for Anson SMC between 1981 and 1986, and a Non-constituency Member of Parliament (NCMP) from 1997 to 2001.

Born in Jaffna in 1926, Jeyaretnam grew up in Malaya and Singapore before he studied law in London and qualified as a barrister in 1951. Upon returning to Singapore, he worked in the legal service from 1952 to 1963 before setting up his own law firm in 1968. He entered politics in 1971 and became the secretary-general of the Workers' Party. Thereafter, he contested the 1972, 1976, 1980 general election, and the 1977 and 1979 by-elections, but lost to candidates of the governing People's Action Party (PAP) in all of them.

Jeyaretnam had his first electoral victory in the 1981 by-election in Anson SMC when he won 51.93% of the vote against the PAP's Pang Kim Hin and United People's Front's Harbans Singh, becoming the first opposition politician to be elected to Parliament since Singapore gained independence in 1965. He contested the 1984 general election in Anson SMC again and won with 56.81% of the vote against the PAP's Ng Pock Too.

In 1986, following convictions for making false statements about the Workers' Party's accounts, Jeyaretnam was not only fined and imprisoned for a month, but also lost his parliamentary seat. After he was disqualified from practising law in 1987, he appealed to the Judicial Committee of the Privy Council, which reversed his disbarment in 1988 and called his conviction "a grievous injustice". Jeyaretnam appealed to Wee Kim Wee, the President of Singapore, for his convictions to be removed so that he could return to Parliament, but was denied.

During the 1997 general election, Jeyaretnam joined a five-member Workers' Party team to contest in Cheng San GRC, but they lost 45.18% of the vote against the PAP team. Since the Workers' Party team in Cheng San GRC were the "best losers" in an election in which there were fewer than six elected opposition Members of Parliament, they were offered one parliamentary seat as a Non-Constituency Member of Parliament (NCMP), which Jeyaretnam took up. However, Jeyaretnam lost his NCMP seat and left the Workers' Party in 2001 when he was declared bankrupt after failing to keep up with damages from a series of defamation suits against him.

After his discharge from bankruptcy in 2007, Jeyaretnam founded the Reform Party in June 2008. He died of heart failure on 30 September that year.

== Early life and education ==
An Anglican Christian of Sri Lankan Tamil descent, Jeyaretnam was born in Chankanai, Jaffna while his parents were on leave from Malaya. His father, Victor Lord Joshua, moved to Malaya and took up a position with the Public Works Department.

Jeyaretnam grew up in Johor and started his formal education in Muar in a French convent where his eldest sister was a student. When his education at English College Johore Bahru was disrupted by the Japanese occupation of Malaya, Jeyaretnam learned Japanese to make himself more employable, and began working in the census department, then as an interpreter in the Japanese Transport Department. In Jeyaretnam's oral interviews, he said it was a means to avoid being pressed into building the Burma Railway, which was called the "Death Railway" due to the high fatality rate during its construction.

After the war, Jeyaretnam moved to Singapore, where he continued his education at St. Andrew's School. In 1948, he left for England to read law at University College London and graduated with a Bachelor of Laws (Honours) in 1951.

== Legal career ==
After being called to the bar as a barrister at Gray's Inn on 27 November 1951, Jeyaretnam joined the Singapore Legal Service in 1952. In the following 11 years, Jeyaretnam held various positions, including magistrate, district judge, crown counsel, deputy public prosecutor and registrar of the Supreme Court. He was also Singapore's first criminal district judge. In his memoir, Jeyaretnam revealed that he had crossed swords with Lee Kuan Yew when the latter was still a practising lawyer, at times when Jeyaretnam was the deputy public prosecutor and later the presiding court judge. He left the legal service in 1963 for private practice and eventually set up his own law firm in 1968.

In February 1970, a month after the abolition of jury trials in Singapore, Jeyaretnam represented Teo Cheng Leong, who had been found guilty of shooting at a police officer with intent to cause harm and was the first person to be sentenced to death in Singapore by a non-jury trial court with two judges. Before the trial, Jeyaretnam sought to have Teo tried by a jury since his case took place in March 1969, ten months before the abolition of jury trials, so the case should be conferred for a jury trial. Jeyaretnam's request was overruled and Teo was eventually hanged in May 1971.

In 1983, Jeyaretnam defended Tan Mui Choo, one of the three perpetrators of the 1981 Toa Payoh ritual murders.

== Political career ==
=== Elections between 1971 and 1980 ===
In June 1971, Jeyaretnam joined the opposition Workers' Party and became the party's secretary-general. He made his electoral debut in the 1972 general election when he contested in Farrer Park SMC against Lee Chiaw Meng of the governing People's Action Party (PAP) and S. A. Latiff of the opposition United People's Front (UPF). He lost with 23.11% of the vote against Lee's 73.82%, but did better than Latiff's 3.07%.

During the 1976 general election, Jeyaretnam contested in Kampong Chai Chee SMC against PAP candidate Andrew Fong, but lost after garnering 40.08% of the vote against Fong's 59.92%. The following year, he contested in the by-election in Radin Mas SMC against the PAP's Bernard Chen, but lost with 29.41% of the vote against Chen's 70.59%. In 1979, he contested in a by-election in Telok Blangah SMC against Rohan Kamis of the PAP, but lost with 38.78% of the vote against Rohan's 61.22%. During the 1980 general election, he contested in Telok Blangah SMC against Rohan and lost again after garnering 46.98% of the vote against his opponent's 53.02%.

=== First opposition Member of Parliament since 1965 ===
Jeyaretnam contested in a three-cornered fight during the 1981 by-election in Anson SMC against Pang Kim Hin of the PAP and Harbans Singh of the United People's Front. He won with 51.93% of the vote against Pang's 47.1% and Singh's 0.97%, becoming the first opposition politician to be elected to Parliament since Singapore gained independence in 1965. In the same year, Jeyaretnam represented Chiam See Tong, founder of the opposition Singapore Democratic Party, in filing a writ in the High Court seeking damages from Defence Minister Howe Yoon Chong and Foreign Affairs Minister S. Dhanabalan for slandering him during the speeches they made in 1980. Chiam eventually dropped the lawsuits against Howe and Dhanabalan after they publicly apologised to him.

In 1982, a complaint against Jeyaretnam was referred to the Singapore Parliament's Committee of Privileges, which looks into allegations of breaches of parliamentary privilege. He received a reprimand for not declaring a conflict of interest in an issue he brought up in Parliament which involved a person whom he was representing as a lawyer.

Jeyaretnam contested in Anson SMC again during the 1984 general election and won with 56.81% of the vote against the PAP candidate Ng Pock Too's 43.19%. The 1984 general election also saw Chiam winning the election in Potong Pasir SMC with 60.28% against the PAP candidate Mah Bow Tan. Jeyaretnam and Chiam were the only two elected opposition Members of Parliament in the Sixth Parliament.

=== Parliamentary fines and loss of parliamentary seat ===
In March 1986, Jeyaretnam was referred to the Committee of Privileges again for making an unsubstantiated allegation in Parliament about the wrongful arrest of a citizen and failing to declare a conflict of interest in an issue he brought up in Parliament. He received two fines amounting to S$2,000.

Jeyaretnam was also fined S$1,000 by the committee for alleging that the Cabinet had interfered with the Subordinate Courts. After he sent letters to Anson SMC residents about the committee's conduct during his hearing, he was fined a total of S$25,000 for making a distorted report of the hearing in his letters.

On 10 November 1986, Jeyaretnam lost his parliamentary seat following his convictions for making false statements.

Jeyaretnam was fined S$10,000 in 1987 on a complaint that he, as the editor of the Workers' Party's newsletter "The Hammer", had allowed the publication of a distorted report on the committee in December 1986. The Workers' Party's executive council was also fined S$5,000.

=== Presidential elections ===
In 1993, Jeyaretnam submitted an application for a certificate of eligibility to contest the presidential election but his application was rejected.

=== 1997 general election ===
During the 1997 general election, Jeyaretnam joined a five-member Workers' Party team to contest in Cheng San GRC against a PAP team led by Education Minister Lee Yock Suan. However, the Workers' Party team lost after garnering 45.18% of the vote against the PAP team's 54.82%. Since the Workers' Party team in Cheng San GRC were the "best losers" in an election in which there were fewer than six elected opposition Members of Parliament, they were offered one parliamentary seat as a Non-constituency Member of Parliament (NCMP). The Workers' Party selected Jeyaretnam to be the NCMP, which he accepted. He lost his NCMP seat after being declared bankrupt in July 2001 because undischarged bankrupts are barred from serving in Parliament and running for parliamentary elections.

=== Leaving the Workers' Party ===
In October 2001, Jeyaretnam left the Workers' Party after he felt ostracised by his fellow party members and after he accused the party's leaders of not offering to help him with his debt payments.

=== Founding the Reform Party ===
Following his discharge from bankruptcy in May 2007, Jeyaretnam announced his intention in April 2008 to challenge the PAP government again by forming a new political party, the Reform Party. On 17 June 2008, the Registry of Societies approved the Reform Party's application, making it an officially registered society in Singapore. Jeyaretnam served as the interim secretary-general of the party, which had only the legal minimum of ten members at the time of its creation.

== Legal troubles ==
=== 1977–1979: Defamation suit from Lee Kuan Yew ===
After the 1976 general election, Lee Kuan Yew demanded an unconditional apology from Jeyaretnam for making the following remarks in a speech during the lead-up to the election:

"Mr Lee Kuan Yew has managed his fortune very well. He is the Prime Minister of Singapore. His wife is the senior partner of Lee & Lee and his brother is the director of several companies, including Tat Lee Bank in Market Street; the bank which was given a permit with alacrity, [a] banking permit licence, when other banks were having difficulties getting their licence."

Lee filed a defamation suit against Jeyaretnam in court when the latter refused to apologise. Lee and Jeyaretnam were represented in court by Queen's Counsels Robert Alexander and John Mortimer respectively, with the latter defending Jeyaretnam pro bono. A five-day trial took place in November 1978 and made headlines in The Straits Times. During the trial, Michael Wong Pakshong, the managing director of the Monetary Authority of Singapore (MAS), claimed that the law firm Lee & Lee (run by Lee's wife Kwa Geok Choo) and Lee's brother Lee Kim Yew (a director of Tat Lee Bank) had no influence on the MAS's decision to grant a banking licence to Tat Lee Bank. Mortimer, while defending Jeyaretnam, said that Jeyaretnam held no responsibility for all the insinuations inferred from his words.

In January 1979, Jeyaretnam lost the case and was ordered by High Court judge Frederick Arthur Chua to pay Lee S$130,000 in damages and costs. He appealed to the Court Appeal and Judicial Committee of the Privy Council but lost both appeals and incurred up to S$500,000 in damages and costs. As a result, he had to sell his bungalow to pay the damages and costs, and move into a rental apartment.

=== 1983–1986: Convictions for making false statements ===
In December 1983, Jeyaretnam and Workers' Party chairman Wong Hong Toy were charged with falsely declaring the party's accounts. They were also accused of defrauding Tay Boon Too, a PAP Member of Parliament whom the Workers' Party had unsuccessfully sued for defamation in 1972. The suit had been dismissed by High Court judge Frederick Arthur Chua, who had also ordered the Workers' Party to pay Tay's legal costs amounting to S$14,000.

In early 1984, senior district judge Michael Khoo found Jeyaretnam and Wong guilty of one of the four charges they faced but acquitted them of the other three. After both the defendants and the prosecution appealed against the judgement, the case was heard in May 1984 by Chief Justice Wee Chong Jin. In April 1985, Wee found Jeyaretnam and Wong guilty of two of the three charges they had been acquitted of earlier, and fined them S$2,000 each. He also ordered a retrial for the offence of making a false declaration.

On 25 September 1985, Jeyaretnam and Wong were found guilty by a district court and each sentenced to three months' imprisonment, but they appealed against the judgement. In November 1986, High Court judge Lai Kew Chai dismissed their appeals but reduced their sentences to one month's imprisonment and fined them S$5,000 each. Under the Singapore Constitution, a Member of Parliament has to vacate his/her seat if he/she is fined S$2,000 or more, or sentenced to a jail term of 12 months or more, so on 10 December 1986, Jeyaretnam lost his parliamentary seat.

=== 1987–1988: Disbarment and reversal ===
After Jeyaretnam completed serving his one-month jail term on 10 December 1986, the Law Society of Singapore, acting on a complaint by Attorney-General Tan Boon Teik, commenced proceedings against him under the Legal Profession Act on the grounds that he was no longer fit to practise law because of his convictions. In October 1987, a panel of three judges, including Chief Justice Wee Chong Jin, struck Jeyaretnam off the roll of advocates and solicitors of the Supreme Court, barring him from practising law in Singapore.

In October 1988, following an appeal from Jeyaretnam, the Judicial Committee of the Privy Council (JCPC) reversed his disbarment, noting in their judgement:

Their Lordships have to record their deep disquiet that by a series of misjudgements, the appellant and his co-accused Wong, have suffered a grievous injustice. They have been fined, imprisoned and publicly disgraced for offences of which they are not guilty. The appellant, in addition, has been deprived of his seat in Parliament and disqualified for a year from practising his profession. Their Lordships order restores him to the roll of advocates and solicitors of the Supreme Court of Singapore, but, because of the course taken by the criminal proceedings, their Lordships have no power to right the other wrongs which the appellant and Wong have suffered. Their only prospect of redress, their Lordships understand, will be by way of petition for pardon to the President of the Republic of Singapore.

After the JCPC's judgement, Jeyaretnam requested President Wee Kim Wee to remove his convictions. However, the President, constitutionally bound to act in accordance with the Cabinet's advice, denied the request, so Jeyaretnam remained disqualified from participating in parliamentary elections until 1991.

=== 1988–1990: Defamation suit from Lee Kuan Yew ===
Although Jeyaretnam was barred from contesting in the 1988 general election due to his convictions in 1986, he still participated in the Workers' Party's rallies during the campaigning period. In one rally speech, he questioned if the PAP government had carried out an inquiry into the death of former National Development Minister Teh Cheang Wan, who had committed suicide in December 1986 by overdosing while he was being investigated for corruption. Jeyaretnam asked how Teh had obtained the tablets he used to commit suicide, and if Prime Minister Lee Kuan Yew had responded to a letter from Teh written before his suicide.

After the election, Lee sued Jeyaretnam for slander, alleging that Jeyaretnam implied that he had abetted Teh's suicide and covered up corruption. In August 1990, High Court judge Lai Kew Chai ruled against Jeyaretnam and ordered him to pay Lee damages of S$260,000 with interest on the amount and costs. After Jeyaretnam lost his appeal to the Court of Appeal, he attempted to appeal to the Judicial Committee of the Privy Council (JCPC) again. However, the law had been amended since the 1988 JCPC ruling in Jeyaretnam's favour. Under the new rules, for civil cases, an appeal to the JCPC would be allowed only if all parties involved consented to it. Lee did not give his consent so Jeyaretnam could not appeal to the JCPC. All remaining appeals to the JCPC were eventually abolished from 8 April 1994 onwards.

=== 1995–2001: Defamation suits from Tamil PAP MPs and others ===
In November 1995, Jeyaretnam and the Workers' Party's central executive committee faced two defamation suits. The first was from five PAP Members of Parliament of Tamil origin, including Foreign Affairs Minister S. Jayakumar. The second was from Indra Krishnan and members of the organising committee of the Tamil Language Week. The lawsuits came after an article published in the Workers' Party's newsletter "The Hammer" implied that the plaintiffs' efforts to promote the Tamil language in Singapore had not been sincere enough.

In September 1997, Jeyaretnam and the Workers' Party agreed to pay S$200,000 in damages and costs to the five PAP Members of Parliament by six instalments. Three instalments amounting to S$100,000 were paid by February 1998.

On 30 November 1998, the High Court ordered Jeyaretnam and the Workers' Party to pay S$265,000 in damages and costs to ten plaintiffs in the second lawsuit. The Workers' Party appealed against the judgement but lost the appeal on 21 April 1999. At the time, the total sum had increased to almost S$500,000, including legal costs. Eight of the plaintiffs initiated bankruptcy proceedings against him and he was declared bankrupt in January 2001. In July 2001, Jeyaretnam appealed against his bankruptcy order and his case was heard in the Court of Appeal on 23 July 2001.

=== 1997–2001: Defamation suits from Goh Chok Tong and others ===
Following the 1997 general election, Jeyaretnam faced nine defamation suits from 11 Cabinet ministers and Members of Parliament from the PAP for speaking up in support of Workers' Party candidate Tang Liang Hong, who himself also faced 13 defamation suits. The plaintiffs included Senior Minister Lee Kuan Yew, Prime Minister Goh Chok Tong, and Deputy Prime Ministers Lee Hsien Loong and Tony Tan. The lawsuits came after Tang had accused the plaintiffs of lying when they labelled him as "anti-Christian" and "Chinese chauvinist" during the campaigning period. Jeyaretnam had also said during a rally speech,

"Finally, Mr Tang Liang Hong has just placed before me two reports he has made to the police against, you know, Mr Goh Chok Tong and his people."

During the trial, which started on 18 August 1997, Jeyaretnam and Goh were represented by Queen's Counsels George Carman and Thomas Shields respectively. On 20 August 1997, Carman accused Goh of lying and challenged his assertions that Singapore was a democracy. During cross-examination by Carman, Goh likened Jeyaretnam's statement to throwing a Molotov cocktail. However, on further questioning, Goh also stated that "it has been a good year" for him and his standing as a leader had not been injured. The trial generated much public interest, with representatives from the International Commission of Jurists and Amnesty International in attendance as observers.

High Court judge S. Rajendran, who heard the case, delivered his judgement on 29 September 1997. He found Jeyaretnam's words were non-intentional yet defamatory, but not to the extent which Goh claimed, and ordered Jeyaretnam to pay Goh damages of S$20,000 (10% of what Goh claimed) and 60% of Goh's legal costs. The judge also said Goh should pay 40% as the case was "overstated" and criticised the other plaintiffs' lawyers for not consolidating their lawsuits to reduce legal costs. Goh appealed against the judgement and the damages were subsequently increased to S$100,000 plus legal costs.

The Amnesty International representatives who observed the trials said that the lawsuits were politically motivated. Goh commenced bankruptcy proceedings against Jeyaretnam after he failed to pay an instalment, but discontinued them later with S$31,000 still outstanding.

In December 2000, Lee Kuan Yew and the other plaintiffs resumed the 1997 defamation suits against Jeyaretnam which had not been heard in court yet. Jeyaretnam attempted to have those lawsuits dismissed, but his application was turned down so he appealed to the Court of Appeal, which heard the case on 25 July 2001.

==== Leaking of the police reports to the press ====
On 25 April 2019, former SPH journalist Bertha Henson revealed in a blog post that the police reports which Tang Liang Hong made in 1997 had been unofficially forwarded by the Singapore Police Force to The New Paper, which published them. After Tang and Jeyaretnam were sued for defamation, Henson and The New Paper editor P. N. Balji realised that they had inadvertently spread the allegedly defamatory words to more people, meaning that the plaintiffs could have sought more damages if they had won the lawsuits.

The following day, Kenneth Jeyaretnam called Henson's confession "brave" and said that it "provided prima facie evidence of corruption" in the 1997 lawsuits against his father. He also said that the unauthorised leaks had allowed the plaintiffs to claim aggravated damages, and that his father's lawyer George Carman could have used the unauthorised leaks in his defence.

=== 2001–2007: Bankruptcy ===
On 23 and 25 July 2001, the Court of Appeal dismissed two bankruptcy appeals from Jeyaretnam after he failed to pay instalments on time for the damages arising from the earlier defamation lawsuits. As undischarged bankrupts are barred from serving in Parliament, Jeyaretnam lost his seat as a Non-constituency Member of Parliament on 25 July 2001. He was also disbarred.

To pay off his debts, Jeyaretnam went onto the streets to sell copies of two books he wrote: Make It Right for Singapore and The Hatchet Man of Singapore. The first book contains the texts of some of his parliamentary speeches from 1997 to 1999, while the second describes his trials. In 2003, he told the Associated Press that he had managed to sell as many as 10 copies of The Hatchet Man of Singapore each time he went out, and that the first 2,000 copies had been almost sold out.

In May 2007, Jeyaretnam was discharged from bankruptcy after he paid the remaining sum of S$233,255.78 owed to his creditors.

== J B Jeyaretnam Foundation ==
On 5 January 2021, a charity tentatively named "J B Jeyaretnam Foundation" was set up to focus on poverty relief among marginalised groups.

== Personal life ==
Jeyaretnam met his wife, Margaret Cynthia Walker, while they were both studying law in London. Walker joined Jeyaretnam in Singapore in 1956 and they married in February 1957. She died of cancer in 1980. They had two sons, Kenneth Jeyaretnam and Philip Jeyaretnam. Kenneth Jeyaretnam, a former hedge fund manager, was secretary-general of the Reform Party between 2009 and his death in 2026. Philip Jeyaretnam, a Senior Counsel, has been a judge of the Supreme Court since 2021 and was the president of the Law Society from 2004 to 2007.

== Death ==
Jeyaretnam was rushed to Tan Tock Seng Hospital in the early morning of 30 September 2008 after he complained that he had difficulties breathing. The doctors were unable to revive him and he died of heart failure at the age of 82.

== In media ==
In 2001, three lecturers from Ngee Ann Polytechnic made a 15-minute documentary about Jeyaretnam after they met him while he was selling books on the streets. At the time, they did not know that he was a prominent opposition politician, and had not obtained official approval from Ngee Ann Polytechnic to make the documentary. The film was going to be screened at the Singapore International Film Festival in April 2002. However, the documentary was in violation of the Films Act, which bans the making, distribution and showing of films containing "wholly or partly either partisan or biased references to or comments on any political matter." As a result, it was withdrawn from the film festival and the three lecturers apologised.

== See also ==
- List of Singapore opposition party MPs elected

== Bibliography ==
- Jeyaretnam, J. B. (2000). Make It Right for Singapore: Speeches in Parliament, 1997-1999. Singapore: Jeya Publishers. ISBN 981-04-2226-1. OCLC 44613349.
- Jeyaretnam, J. B. (2003). The Hatchet Man of Singapore. Singapore: Jeya Publishers. ISBN 981-04-8513-1. OCLC 53139136.
- Lydgate, Chris (2003). Lee's Law: How Singapore Crushes Dissent. Scribe Publications. ISBN 9780908011896.

== Notes ==
Political offices
Parliament of Singapore
Preceded by Lim Huan Boon	Unofficial Leader of the Opposition; 1981–1986	Succeeded by Chiam See Tong
Preceded by C.V. Devan Nair	Member of Parliament for Anson; 1981–1986	Vacant
Preceded by Lee Siew Choh	Non-Constituency Member of Parliament; 1997–2001	Succeeded by Steve Chia
