= Cheng San Group Representation Constituency =

Electoral division in Singapore

Cheng San
- Former group representation constituency for the Parliament of Singapore

Former constituency
- Created: 1988; 37 years ago
- Abolished: 2001; 24 years ago
- Seats: 5
- Member: Constituency Abolished
- Created from: Cheng San Single Member Constituency; Chong Boon Single Member Constituency; Jalan Kayu Constituency
- Replaced by: Aljunied GRC; Ang Mo Kio GRC; Pasir Ris–Punggol GRC

Cheng San Group Representation Constituency (Note: Malay: Kawasan Undi Perwakilan Berkumpulan Cheng San; Chinese: 静山集选区; Tamil: செங் சான் குழுத்தொகுதி) was a group representation constituency (GRC) in the north-eastern part of Singapore. It comprised the eastern section of Ang Mo Kio, Jalan Kayu, Seletar Hills, part of Serangoon North, much of Hougang and Buangkok as well as the entirety of both Sengkang and Punggol.

The constituency came into national prominence during the 1997 general election, which was the final contest before its abolition and redrawing for the 2001 general election. Its last Members of Parliament (MPs) were Lee Yock Suan, Heng Chiang Meng, Michael Lim Chun Leng, Zainul Abidin Bin Mohamed Rasheed and Yeo Guat Kwang, all representing the People's Action Party (PAP).

== History ==
=== 1988: Establishment ===
Cheng San GRC was established in 1988, following the establishment of GRC and Single Member Constituency (SMC), by merging the Cheng San, Chong Boon and Jalan Kayu Constituencies. The GRC was originally represented by three MPs. During the 1991 general election, it absorbed Punggol SMC and was expanded to a four-member GRC. In that election, the PAP secured 64.05 percent of the valid votes, while the National Solidarity Party (NSP) team received 35.95 percent.

=== 1997: Hotly contested election ===
During the 1997 general election, Cheng San GRC underwent boundary changes. Parts of the Chong Boon division, bounded by Ang Mo Kio Avenue 10, Ang Mo Kio Avenue 3, the Central Expressway and Ang Mo Kio Avenue 1, were absorbed into Ang Mo Kio GRC. At the same time, the Punggol division was split into three divisions: Punggol Central, Punggol East and Punggol South, reflecting the population growth in Hougang and Sengkang. As a result of these adjustments, Cheng San became a five-member GRC.

The constituency was hotly contested between the People's Action Party (PAP) and the Workers' Party (WP) in 1997. The PAP team was led by Lee Yock Suan, then Minister for Education, while the WP team was headed by its Secretary-General Joshua Benjamin Jeyaretnam alongside senior lawyer Tang Liang Hong. The PAP campaign received heavy support from Prime Minister Goh Chok Tong, PAP's Secretary-General, and his two deputies, who all campaigned actively in Cheng San. Goh described himself as "a special candidate" of the constituency, declaring that his credibility and reputation as Prime Minister were "at stake" in the contest.

The PAP campaign adopted a two-pronged approach. First, the party accused Tang of being "anti-Christian" and a "Chinese chauvinist", branding him a "dangerous man". Second, Goh promised voters that returning PAP candidates would secure improvements such as new transport links through the Mass Rapid Transit (MRT) and Light Rail Transit (LRT), housing projects like Punggol 21 and opportunities to upgrade HDB estates. The PAP stressed that constituencies which did not elect PAP candidates would not be prioritised for upgrading and risked "deteriorating into slums". Meanwhile, the WP drew large crowds at its rallies in Cheng San, with an estimated 50,000 people attending its final rally at Yio Chu Kang Stadium on the eve of polling. However, reports of the turnout were downplayed in The Straits Times, leading to criticism of the newspaper's neutrality.

==== Presence of PAP politicians at polling stations ====
On Polling Day, several senior PAP leaders, including Goh Chok Tong, Tony Tan and Lee Hsien Loong, were present within the precincts of polling stations in Cheng San GRC, despite not being candidates in the constituency. The WP argued that their presence contravened the Parliamentary Elections Act, which prohibits unauthorised persons from entering polling stations in order to prevent undue influence or intimidation of voters and staff. The WP candidates subsequently lodged police reports, citing alleged breaches of two sections of the Parliamentary Elections Act:

- Section 82(1)(d): "No person shall wait outside any polling station on polling day, except for the purpose of gaining entry to the polling station to cast his vote".
- Section 82(1)(e): "No person shall loiter in any street or public place within a radius of 200 metres of any polling station on polling day."

Their complaints were however not prosecuted by the police, on the advice of the Attorney-General (AG) Chan Sek Keong. Chan, in his letter to the Minister for Law S. Jayakumar, argued that the statute was "irrelevant" to individuals inside a polling station. This interpretation was unusual, as it meant that remaining inside the station was permissible, while being in the surrounding area within 200 metres of its external walls was considered an offence. He further stated that "the possibility of a person inside a polling station influencing or intimidating voters in the presence of the presiding officer, polling officials and polling agents was regarded as so remote that it was discounted by the Act." This reasoning was also peculiar, as it implied that being inside the polling station posed no risk of undue influence, whereas merely standing within 200 metres outside could.

The WP rebuked this interpretation, questioning whether the AG was suggesting that it was acceptable for people to enter and remain on the grounds of the polling station, while it was not permissible to stand outside the station. The WP subsequently renewed its call for a neutral and multi-party election commission to safeguard fair play in the conduct of general elections.

==== Results ====
The counting of the ballots was delayed; a WP candidate and two counting agents had lodged objections after the first batch of ballot papers were counted. The PAP ultimately retained Cheng San GRC, receiving 54.82% of the vote. As the WP team in Cheng San GRC were the "best losers" in an election with fewer than six elected opposition MPs, they were offered one seat for a non-constituency Member of Parliament (NCMP). Jeyaretnam was selected by the WP to accept the seat, which he did.

Following the election, Tang was sued for defamation by various PAP ministers and subsequently fled to Australia. Jeyaretnam lost his NCMP seat after being declared bankrupt in July 2001, as undischarged bankrupts are barred from serving in Parliament and standing in parliamentary elections. He died in 2008, while Tang, who died in 2025, never returned to Singapore after the election.

=== 2001: Abolition ===
After a hotly contested election in 1997, the GRC was split and subsumed into three GRCs prior to the 2001 general election. The GRCs which absorbed Cheng San GRC were Ang Mo Kio GRC, Pasir Ris–Punggol GRC and Aljunied GRC due to redrawing of electoral districts by the Elections Department.

== Members of Parliament ==
Election	Division	Members of Parliament	Party
Formation
1988	Cheng San; Chong Boon; Jalan Kayu	Lee Yock Suan; Sitaram Chandra Das; Heng Chiang Meng	PAP
1991	Cheng San; Chong Boon; Jalan Kayu; Punggol	Lee Yock Suan; Sitaram Chandra Das; Heng Chiang Meng; Michael Lim Chun Leng	PAP
1997	Cheng San; Jalan Kayu; Punggol Central; Punggol East; Punggol South	Lee Yock Suan; Heng Chiang Meng; Michael Lim Chun Leng; Zainul Abidin; Yeo Guat Kwang	PAP
Abolished (2001)

== Electoral results ==
Note: The Elections Department does not include rejected votes when calculating the vote shares of candidates. Hence, all candidates' vote shares will total to 100% at any given election (may not appear so in multi-way contests due to rounding).

=== Elections in 1980s ===
General Election 1988
Party	Candidate	Votes	%
PAP	Sitaram Chandra Das; Heng Chiang Meng; Lee Yock Suan	Unopposed	
Registered electors		56,352	
PAP win (new seat)			

=== Elections in 1990s ===
General Election 1991
Party	Candidate	Votes	%	±%
PAP	Sitaram Chandra Das Heng Chiang Meng Lee Yock Suan Michael Lim Chun Leng	54,963	64.05	N/A
NSP	Pok Lee Chuen Chng Chin Siah Gertrude Magdeline De Gracias Chng Wee Hong	30,849	35.95	N/A
Majority		24,114	28.10	N/A
Total valid votes		85,812	96.77	N/A
Rejected ballots		2,864	3.23	N/A
Turnout		88,676	95.37	N/A
Registered electors		92,979		▲65.0
PAP hold		Swing	N/A	

General Election 1997
Party	Candidate	Votes	%	±%
PAP	Lee Yock Suan Yeo Guat Kwang Zainul Abidin bin Mohamed Rasheed Heng Chiang Meng Michael Lim Chun Leng	53,553	54.82	▼9.23
WP	Joshua Benjamin Jeyaretnam Tang Liang Hong Tan Bin Seng Huang Seow Kwang Abdul Rahim bin Osman	44,132	45.18	N/A
Majority		9,421	9.64	▼18.46
Total valid votes		97,685	98.18	▲1.41
Rejected ballots		1,812	1.82	▼1.41
Turnout		99,497	96.30	N/A
Registered electors		103,323		▲0.93
PAP hold		Swing	▼9.23	

== See also ==
- Cheng San SMC
- Eunos Group Representation Constituency
