= Yio Chu Kang Single Member Constituency (1980 – 1991) =

Former electoral division in Singapore

Yio Chu Kang
- Former single-member constituency for the Parliament of Singapore
- Region: North-East Region, Singapore

Former constituency
- Created: 1980; 46 years ago
- Abolished: 1991; 35 years ago
- Seats: 1
- Party: People's Action Party
- Member: Lau Ping Sum
- Merged to: Ang Mo Kio GRC (1991)

The Yio Chu Kang Single Member Constituency (Note: Malay: Kawasan Undi Perseorangan Yio Chu Kang; Chinese: 杨厝港单选区; Tamil: இயோ சூ காங் தனித்தொகுதி) was a single-member constituency (SMC) situated in north-eastern Singapore. It was established in 1980 and was merged into Ang Mo Kio Group Representation Constituency (GRC) in 1991. The Member of Parliament (MP) for the constituency was Lau Ping Sum from the People's Action Party (PAP).

== Electoral history ==
Yio Chu Kang Constituency was created in 1980. At the election held in the same year, Lau Ping Sum from the PAP won with 87.53% of the vote. He would represent the constituency until 1991, when it was abolished and merged into Ang Mo Kio GRC.

In 1988, following the creation of GRC and SMC, the constituency was renamed Yio Chu Kang SMC.

Prior to the 1991 Singaporean general election, Yio Chu Kang SMC was merged into Ang Mo Kio GRC.

== Member of Parliament ==
Year	Member	Party
Formation
1980	Lau Ping Sum	PAP
1984	Lau Ping Sum	PAP
1988	Lau Ping Sum	PAP
Constituency abolished (1991)

== Electoral results ==
Note: The Elections Department does not include rejected votes when calculating the vote shares of candidates. Hence, all candidates' vote shares will total to 100% at any given election (may not appear so in multi-way contests due to rounding).

=== Elections in 1980s ===
General Election 1980
Party	Candidate	Votes	%
PAP	Lau Ping Sum	11,607	87.5
United People's Front	Piaro Lachhu S.	1,653	12.5
Majority		9,954	75.00
Total valid votes			
Rejected ballots			
Turnout		13,640	97.3
Registered electors			
PAP win (new seat)			

General Election 1984
Party	Candidate	Votes	%	±%
PAP	Lau Ping Sum	11,977	76.7	▼10.8
United People's Front	Munjeet Singh	3,647	23.3	▲10.8
Majority		8,330	53.40	▼21.6
Total valid votes				
Rejected ballots				
Turnout		16,281	97.3	
Registered electors				
PAP hold		Swing	▼21.6	

General Election 1988
Party	Candidate	Votes	%	±%
PAP	Lau Ping Sum	10,996	73.7	▼3.0
NSP	Rasiah Thiagarajah	3,931	26.3	▲26.3
Majority		7,065	47.40	▼21.6
Turnout		15,376	96.2	▼1.1
PAP hold		Swing	▼3.0	
