= Saidi Shariff =

Singaporean politician (1940–2020)

- سيدي شريف

Member of Parliament for Kaki Bukit
- In office 1980–1984
- Preceded by: Constituency Established
- Succeeded by: Chew Heng Ching

Personal details
- Born: Saidi bin Shariff; 1940
- Died: 14 January 2020 (aged 79)
- Party: People's Action Party
- Education: University of Hull Raffles Institution (1955-1958)

Saidi bin Shariff (Note: Jawi: سيدي بن شريف) (1940 – 14 January 2020) was a Singaporean politician belonging to People's Action Party. He was a member of the Parliament of Singapore.

== Biography ==
Saidi was a founding member of Yayasan Mendaki which is a self-help group. He received secondary education in Raffles Institution from 1955 to 1958. In the sixties he worked at the National Community Leadership Training Institute. He was elected as a member of the Parliament of Singapore from Kaki Bukit in 1980.

After his parliamentary career, Saidi started to take classes for young leaders. Later, he received a postgraduate degree from the University of Hull at the age of 56. He retired as an assistant director from Yayasan Mendaki in 2002.

Saidi died on 14 January 2020 at the age of 79.
