= Bukit Ho Swee Constituency =

Former electoral division in Singapore

Coordinates: 1.288°N 103.830°E

Bukit Ho Swee
- Former Single Member constituency for the Parliament of Singapore
- Region: Singapore

Former constituency
- Created: 1968
- Abolished: 1984
- Seats: 1
- Party: People's Action Party
- Member: Seah Mui Kok

Bukit Ho Swee Constituency was a constituency in Singapore. It used to exist from 1968 to 1984. It was established in 1968 and was abolished in 1984.The last Member of Parliament (MP) for the constituency was Seah Mui Kok from the People's Action Party (PAP).

== Electoral history ==
Prior to the 1984 Singaporean general election, the constituency was carved up and absorbed into Kim Seng and Havelock Constituencies.

== Member of Parliament ==
Year	Member	Party
Formation
1968	Seah Mui Kok	PAP
1972	Seah Mui Kok	PAP
1976	Seah Mui Kok	PAP
1980	Seah Mui Kok	PAP
Abolished (1984)

== Electoral results ==
Note: The Elections Department does not include rejected votes when calculating the vote shares of candidates. Hence, all candidates' vote shares will total to 100% at any given election (may not appear so in multi-way contests due to rounding).

=== Elections in 1960s ===
General Election 1968
Party	Candidate	Votes	%
PAP	Seah Mui Kok	Unopposed	
Registered electors		17,735	
PAP win (new seat)			

=== Elections in 1970s ===
General Election 1972
Party	Candidate	Votes	%	±%
PAP	Seah Mui Kok	7,862	68.77	N/A
BS	Chin Tian Choo	2,209	19.32	N/A
WP	Wee Kia Eng	1,361	11.91	N/A
Majority		5,653	49.45	N/A
Total valid votes				N/A
Rejected ballots				N/A
Turnout		11,432	93.61	N/A
Registered electors		12,212		▼31.14
PAP hold		Swing	N/A	

General Election 1976
Party	Candidate	Votes	%	±%
PAP	Seah Mui Kok	9,451	73.50	▲4.73
United Front	Hwang Ban Cheong	3,407	26.50	N/A
Majority		6,044	47.00	▼2.45
Total valid votes		12,858		N/A
Rejected ballots		307		N/A
Turnout		12,858	93.95	▼0.34
Registered electors		13,686		▲12.07
PAP hold		Swing		

=== Elections in 1980s ===
General Election 1980
Party	Candidate	Votes	%	±%
PAP	Seah Mui Kok	Unopposed		
Registered electors		12,435		▼9.14
PAP hold				
