= Lee Yock Suan =

Singaporean politician

- 李玉全

Minister in the Prime Minister's Office
- In office 23 November 2001 – 11 August 2004 Serving with Lim Boon Heng and Lim Hng Kiang
- Prime Minister: Goh Chok Tong
- Succeeded by: Lim Boon Heng; Lim Swee Say

Second Minister for Foreign Affairs
- In office 23 November 2001 – 11 August 2004
- Prime Minister: Goh Chok Tong
- Minister: S. Jayakumar
- Preceded by: Lim Hng Kiang

Minister for Information and the Arts
- In office 3 June 1999 – 22 November 2001
- Prime Minister: Goh Chok Tong
- Preceded by: George Yeo
- Succeeded by: David Lim Tik En (acting)

Minister for the Environment
- In office 3 June 1999 – 30 September 2000
- Prime Minister: Goh Chok Tong
- Preceded by: Yeo Cheow Tong
- Succeeded by: Lim Swee Say (acting)

Minister for Trade and Industry
- In office 25 January 1997 – 2 June 1999
- Prime Minister: Goh Chok Tong
- Preceded by: Yeo Cheow Tong
- Succeeded by: George Yeo

Second Minister for Finance
- In office 25 January 1997 – 31 March 1998
- Prime Minister: Goh Chok Tong
- Minister: Richard Hu
- Succeeded by: Lim Hng Kiang

Minister for Education
- In office 2 January 1992 – 24 January 1997
- Prime Minister: Goh Chok Tong
- Preceded by: Tony Tan
- Succeeded by: Teo Chee Hean

Minister for Labour
- In office 1 January 1987 – 1 January 1992; Acting: 2 January 1985 – 31 December 1986
- Prime Minister: Lee Kuan Yew; Goh Chok Tong
- Preceded by: S. Jayakumar
- Succeeded by: Lee Boon Yang

Second Minister for Education
- In office 7 September 1991 – 1 January 1992
- Prime Minister: Goh Chok Tong
- Minister: Tony Tan

Member of the Singapore Parliament for East Coast GRC
- In office 3 November 2001 – 5 May 2006
- Preceded by: PAP held
- Succeeded by: PAP held

Member of the Singapore Parliament for Cheng San GRC
- In office 3 September 1988 – 18 October 2001
- Preceded by: Constituency established
- Succeeded by: Constituency abolished

Member of the Singapore Parliament for Cheng San Constituency
- In office 23 December 1980 – 17 August 1988
- Preceded by: Constituency established
- Succeeded by: Constituency abolished

Personal details
- Born: Lee Yock Suan; 30 September 1946 (age 80) Colony of Singapore
- Party: People's Action Party
- Children: 2, including Desmond
- Education: Imperial College London (BS)

Lee Yock Suan (Note: Chinese: 李玉全; Pe̍h-ōe-jī: Lí Gio̍k-choân; pinyin: Lǐ Yùquán) (born 30 September 1946) is a Singaporean former politician. A member of the governing People's Action Party (PAP), he served in the Cabinet between 1987 and 2004, and was a Member of Parliament (MP) between 1980 and 2006. He is the father of Desmond Lee, the current Minister for Education.

== Career ==
Lee worked at Singapore's Economic Development Board from 1969 to 1980, initially as a projects officer before becoming Divisional Director (Industry). From 1980 to 1981, he served as Deputy Managing Director of the Petroleum Corporation of Singapore.

=== Political career ===
Lee was first elected to Parliament at the 1980 general election. He served as an MP representing the Cheng San Single Member Constituency (1980–88), the Cheng San Group Representation Constituency (1988–2001) and the East Coast Group Representation Constituency (2001–06).

After serving as a Minister of State at the Ministry of National Development and the Ministry of Finance from 1983 to 1984, Lee was made the Acting Minister for Labour in 1985.

He became a full member of the Cabinet in 1987, and served as the Minister for Labour (1987–91), Minister for Education (1992–97), Second Minister for Finance (1997–98), Minister for Trade and Industry (1997–99), Minister for Information and the Arts (1999–2001), Minister for the Environment (1999–2001), Second Minister for Foreign Affairs (2001–04) and Minister in the Prime Minister's Office (2001–04).

Lee also served as the Deputy Chairman of the People's Association from 1984 to 1991, and as Chairman of the Singapore Labour Foundation from 1997 to 2002.

Lee stepped down from the Cabinet in 2004. He remained an MP until 2006, before retiring from politics at the 2006 general election.

== Education ==
Lee was educated at Queenstown Secondary Technical School and Raffles Institution, before being awarded a President's Scholarship to study at Imperial College London, where he completed a BSc (Hons) degree in chemical engineering. He subsequently completed a Diploma in Business Administration at the University of Singapore.

== Personal life ==
Lee is a Hokkien Chinese and is married to Adeline Oh Choon Neo and has one son and one daughter. His son, Desmond Lee, is a politician who is currently a Member of Parliament for West Coast-Jurong West GRC and Minister for Education.

== Notes ==
Political offices
Preceded by S. Jayakumar	Minister for Labour; Jan 1985 - Dec 1991; Acting: Jan 1985 - Dec 1986	Succeeded by Lee Boon Yang
Preceded by Tony Tan Keng Yam	Minister for Education; 1991–1997	Succeeded by Teo Chee Hean
