= Telok Blangah Single Member Constituency =

Former Singaporean constituency

Telok Blangah
- Former Single Member constituency for the Parliament of Singapore
- Region: Singapore

Current constituency
- Created: 1959
- Seats: 1
- Member: Constituency Abolished
- Town Council: West Coast
- Replaced by: West Coast GRC

Telok Blangah Single Member Constituency was a single member constituency (SMC) in Singapore. The constituency was formed in 1959 and was abolished in 1991.

== History ==
In 1959, the Telok Blangah Constituency was formed.

The Constituency saw Joshua Benjamin Jeyaretnam contesting twice with increasing wins and nearly winning in the 1980 Singapore Election with 47% of the votes before he won in Anson in 1981.

In 1988, it was renamed as Telok Blangah Single Member Constituency as part of Singapore's political reforms. In 1991, it was abolished and merged into West Coast Group Representation Constituency.

== Member of Parliament ==
Year	Member of Parliament	Party
Legislative Assembly of Singapore
1959	John Mammen	PAP
1963	Bernard Rodrigues	PAP
Parliament of Singapore
1968	N. Naidu Govindasamy	PAP
1972	N. Naidu Govindasamy	PAP
1976	Shaik Ahmad bin Abdul Haleem	PAP
1979	Rohan bin Kamis	PAP
1980	Rohan bin Kamis	PAP
1984	Koh Lam Son	PAP
1988	Koh Lam Son	PAP

== Electoral results ==
Note: The Elections Department does not include rejected votes when calculating the vote shares of candidates. Hence, all candidates' vote shares will total to 100% at any given election (may not appear so in multi-way contests due to rounding).

=== Elections in 1950s ===
General Election 1959: Telok Blangah
Party	Candidate	Votes	%
PAP	John Mammen	5,803	50.4
PKMS	Osman Gani	4,141	36.0
Citizens' Party	Wee Kim Hock	1,230	10.7
Independent	V. Mariappan	337	2.9
Majority		1,662	14.4
Registered electors		13,202	
Turnout		11,511	87.2
PAP win (new seat)			

=== Elections in 1960s ===
General Election 1963: Telok Blangah
Party	Candidate	Votes	%	±%
PAP	Bernard Rodrigues	4,949	39.8	−10.6
BS	Jukiri bin Parjo	4,327	34.8	
SA	ABDUL RAHMAN bin Mohamed Said	2,627	21.1	−14.9
UPP	Tan Swee Huat	525	4.2	
Majority		622	5.0	
Registered electors		13,263		
Turnout		12,551	94.6	
PAP hold		Swing	-10.6	

General Election 1968: Telok Blangah
Party	Candidate	Votes	%
PAP	N. Naidu Govindasamy	Walkover	N/A
Registered electors		14,785	
PAP hold			

=== Elections in 1970s ===
General Election 1972: Telok Blangah
Party	Candidate	Votes	%
PAP	N. Naidu Govindasamy	7,669	57.9
WP	Zainul Abiddin Bin Mohd. Shah	4,714	35.6
United National Front	M. Ramasamy	858	6.5
Majority		2,995	22.6
Registered electors		14,624	
Turnout		13,241	90.5
PAP hold			

General Election 1976: Telok Blangah
Party	Candidate	Votes	%
PAP	Shaik Ahmad bin Abdul Haleem	Walkover	N/A
Registered electors		14,225	
PAP hold			

By-election 1979: Telok Blangah
Party	Candidate	Votes	%
PAP	Rohan bin Kamis	12,687	61.2
WP	Joshua Benjamin Jeyaretnam	8,036	38.8
Majority		4,651	22.4
Registered electors		22,202	
Turnout		21,089	95.0
PAP hold			

=== Elections in 1980s ===
General Election 1980: Telok Blangah
Party	Candidate	Votes	%	±%
PAP	Rohan bin Kamis	9,187	53.0	−8.2
WP	Joshua Benjamin Jeyaretnam	8,141	47.0	+8.2
Majority		1,046	6.0	
Turnout		17,592	96.1	
PAP hold		Swing	-8.2	

General Election 1984: Telok Blangah
Party	Candidate	Votes	%	±%
PAP	Koh Lam Son	10,150	55.0	+2.0
WP	Murugason Rajaratnam	8,299	45.0	−2.0
Majority		1,851	10.0	
Turnout		18,771	96.0	−0.1
PAP hold		Swing	+2.0	

General Election 1988: Telok Blangah
Party	Candidate	Votes	%	±%
PAP	Koh Lam Son	11,160	64.2	+9.2
WP	Tan Soo Phuan	6,220	35.8	−9.2
Majority		4,940	28.4	
Turnout		17,732	95.3	−0.7
PAP hold		Swing	+9.2	
