= Chong Boon Constituency =

Former electoral division in Singapore

Chong Boon Single Member Constituency (Simplified Chinese: 崇文单选区;Traditional Chinese: 崇文單選區) was a single member constituency in Ang Mo Kio, Singapore. It was carved from Ang Mo Kio division prior to the 1980 elections and lasted till the 1988 elections, when it was absorbed into Cheng San Group Representation Constituency.

== Member of Parliament ==
Year	Member of Parliament	Party
1980	Sitaram Chandra Das	PAP
1984	Sitaram Chandra Das	PAP

== Electoral results ==
Note: The Elections Department does not include rejected votes when calculating the vote shares of candidates. Hence, all candidates' vote shares will total to 100% at any given election (may not appear so in multi-way contests due to rounding).

=== Elections in 1980s ===
General Election 1980: Chong Boon
Party	Candidate	Votes	%	±%
PAP	Sitaram Chandra Das	Walkover		
Turnout		13,877		
PAP win (new seat)				

General Election 1984: Chong Boon
Party	Candidate	Votes	%	±%
PAP	Sitaram Chandra Das	11,058	56.02	
SDP	Ling How Doong	8,681	43.98	
Turnout		20,107	97.4	
PAP hold		Swing		
