= Yio Chu Kang Single Member Constituency =

Electoral division in Singapore

Yio Chu Kang
- Single-member constituency for the Parliament of Singapore
- Region: North-East Region, Singapore
- Electorate: 25,410

Current constituency
- Created: 2020; 6 years ago
- Seats: 1
- Party: People's Action Party
- Member: Yip Hon Weng
- Town Council: Ang Mo Kio

The Yio Chu Kang Single Member Constituency (Note: Malay: Kawasan Undi Perseorangan Yio Chu Kang; Chinese: 杨厝港单选区; Tamil: இயோ சூ காங் தனித்தொகுதி) is a single-member constituency (SMC) situated in north-eastern Singapore. Recreated in 2020 after it was created and merged twice, it is managed by Ang Mo Kio Town Council (AMKTC). The current Member of Parliament (MP) is Yip Hon Weng from the People's Action Party (PAP).

== Electoral history ==
Yio Chu Kang constituency had previously existed as Yio Chu Kang Constituency from 1980 to 1988, before being renamed Yio Chu Kang SMC from 1988 to 1991. In 1991, it was merged into Ang Mo Kio Group Representation Constituency (GRC) prior to the 1991 general election. In 2006, it was recreated and was merged into Ang Mo Kio GRC again after one term in 2011.

Prior to the 2020 general election, the SMC was reformed for the second time from Ang Mo Kio GRC. Yip Hon Weng from the PAP won with 60.82% of the vote against Kayla Low from the Progress Singapore Party (PSP). Yip won an improved 78.75% of the vote when he ran for reelection in 2025 against Michael Fang from the People's Alliance for Reform (PAR).

== Member of Parliament ==
Interactive map of Yio Chu Kang SMC as of the 2025 general election

Year	Member	Party
Formation
2020	Yip Hon Weng	PAP
2025	Yip Hon Weng	PAP

== Electoral results ==
Note: The Elections Department does not include rejected votes when calculating the vote shares of candidates. Hence, all candidates' vote shares will total to 100% at any given election (may not appear so in multi-way contests due to rounding).

=== Elections in 2020s ===
General Election 2020
Party	Candidate	Votes	%
PAP	Yip Hon Weng	14,775	60.82
PSP	Kayla Low	9,519	39.18
Majority		5,256	21.64
Total valid votes		24,294	98.33
Rejected ballots		413	1.67
Turnout		24,707	95.17
Registered electors		25,962	
PAP win (new seat)			

General Election 2025
Party	Candidate	Votes	%	±%
PAP	Yip Hon Weng	18,066	78.75	▲17.93
PAR	Michael Fang	4,876	21.25	N/A
Majority		13,190	57.50	▲35.86
Total valid votes		22,942	97.62	▼0.71
Rejected ballots		559	2.38	▲0.71
Turnout		23,501	92.49	▼2.68
Registered electors		25,410		▼2.13
PAP hold		Swing	▲17.93	
