= Toa Payoh Constituency =

Historical constituency in Singapore

Toa Payoh Single Member Constituency was a constituency that holds the Toa Payoh area, in the Central Region of Singapore, from 1959 to 1988.

== History ==
The constituency broke away into Boon Teck, Kim Keat and Kuo Chuan in 1972 general elections, and Khe Bong in 1976 general elections.

== Member of Parliament ==
Year	Member of Parliament	Party
1959	Wong Soon Fong	PAP
1963	Wong Soon Fong	BS
1968	Eric Cheong	PAP
1972	Eric Cheong	PAP
1976	Eric Cheong	PAP
1980	Eric Cheong	PAP
1984	Eric Cheong	PAP

== Electoral results ==
Note: The Elections Department does not include rejected votes when calculating the vote shares of candidates. Hence, all candidates' vote shares will total to 100% at any given election (may not appear so in multi-way contests due to rounding).

=== Elections in 1950s ===
General Election 1959
Party	Candidate	Votes	%
PAP	Wong Soon Fong	8,693	77.66
SPA	Lee Poh Chee	2,500	22.34
Majority		6,193	55.32
Registered electors		12,551	
Turnout		11,442	91.16
PAP win (new seat)			

=== Elections in 1960s ===
General Election 1963
Party	Candidate	Votes	%	±%
BS	Wong Soon Fong	6,083	48.20	N/A
PAP	Yip Sai Weng	4,276	33.88	−43.78
UPP	Goh Nee Kim	1,501	11.89	N/A
United Democratic Party	Tan Chor Yong	760	6.03	N/A
Majority		1,807	14.32	▼41
Registered electors		13,394		▲6.72
Turnout		12,772	95.36	▲4.18
BS gain from PAP				

General Election 1968
Party	Candidate	Votes	%	±%
PAP	Eric Cheong	Unopposed		
Registered electors		19,143		▲42.93
PAP hold				

=== Elections in 1970s ===
General Election 1972
Party	Candidate	Votes	%	±%
PAP	Eric Cheong	10,884	73.85	N/A
BS	Tay Cheng Kang	3,853	26.15	N/A
Majority		7,031	47.70	N/A
Registered electors		15,742		▼17.77
Turnout		14,737	93.62	N/A
PAP hold				

General Election 1976
Party	Candidate	Votes	%	±%
PAP	Eric Cheong	9,633	73.63	▼0.22
BS	Abdul Rahim	3,450	26.37	N/A
Majority		6,183	47.26	▼0.44
Registered electors		13,933		▼11.49
Turnout		13,083	93.90	▲0.28
PAP hold		Swing	▼0.22	

=== Elections in 1980s ===
General Election 1980
Party	Candidate	Votes	%	±%
PAP	Eric Cheong	9,872	76.73	▲3.1
BS	Ng Ho	2,994	23.27	N/A
Majority		6,878	53.46	▲6.2
Registered electors		13,799		▼0.96
Turnout		12,866	93.24	▼0.66
PAP hold		Swing	▲3.1	

General Election 1984
Party	Candidate	Votes	%	±%
PAP	Eric Cheong	8,559	65.16	▼11.57
BS	Ng Ho	4,576	34.84	▲11.57
Majority		3,983	30.32	▼23.14
Registered electors		14,177		▲2.74
Turnout		12,866	92.65	▼0.59
PAP hold		Swing	▼11.57	
