= Serangoon Gardens Constituency =

Former Singaporean constituency

Serangoon Gardens Single Member Constituency was a single member constituency in Singapore. It was formed in 1959 by carving out from Serangoon Constituency as Serangoon Gardens Constituency.

In 1976, parts of the constituency was carved out to form Ang Mo Kio Constituency. In 1980, more part of the constituency was carved out to form Cheng San and Chong Boon constituencies.

In 1988, the constituency was renamed as Serangoon Gardens Single Member Constituency (SMC) as part of Singapore's political reforms.

In 1991, the constituency was abolished and merged into Thomson Group Representation Constituency.

== Member of Parliament ==
Year	Incumbent	Party
Legislative Assembly of Singapore
1959	Leong Keng Seng	PAP
1963	R. A. Gonzales	PAP
Parliament of Singapore
1968	Leonard Peter Rodrigo	PAP
1972	Leonard Peter Rodrigo	PAP
1976	Lau Teik Soon	PAP
1980	Lau Teik Soon	PAP
1984	Lau Teik Soon	PAP
1988	Lau Teik Soon	PAP

== Electoral results ==
Note: The Elections Department does not include rejected votes when calculating the vote shares of candidates. Hence, all candidates' vote shares will total to 100% at any given election (may not appear so in multi-way contests due to rounding).

=== Elections in 1950s ===
General Election 1959: Serangoon Gardens
Party	Candidate	Votes	%
PAP	Leong Keng Seng	3,843	48.93
SPA	Eric Wee Sian Beng	2,764	35.19
PKMS	Liao Ping	853	10.86
LF	Victor Louis Fernandez	330	4.20
LSP	Lilian Tan	64	0.82
Majority		1,079	13.74
Registered electors		8,631	
PAP win (new seat)			

=== Elections in 1970s ===
General Election 1976: Serangoon Gardens
Party	Candidate	Votes	%
PAP	Lau Teik Soon	7,471	68.74
WP	C. H. Crabb	3,397	31.26
Majority		4,074	37.48
Registered electors		12,115	
Total valid votes		10,868	
Rejected ballots			
Turnout			
PAP win (new seat)			
