= Kolam Ayer Constituency =

Former electoral constituency in Singapore

Coordinates: 1.318°N 103.867°E

Kolam Ayer
- Former Single member constituency constituency
- Region: Central Region, Singapore

Former constituency
- Created: 1976
- Abolished: 1988
- Seats: 1
- Member: 1
- Replaced by: Eunos Group Representation Constituency

Kolam Ayer Constituency (SMC) was a constituency in Singapore. It used to exist from 1976 to 1988, where Sidek Saniff was Member of Parliament. It merged with another 2 SMCs in 1988 to form the Eunos Group Representation Constituency.

== Member of Parliament ==
Year	Member of Parliament	Party
1976	Sidek Saniff	PAP
1980	Sidek Saniff	PAP
1984	Sidek Saniff	PAP

== Electoral results ==
Note: The Elections Department does not include rejected votes when calculating the vote shares of candidates. Hence, all candidates' vote shares will total to 100% at any given election (may not appear so in multi-way contests due to rounding).

=== Elections in 1970s ===
General Election 1976: Kolam Ayer
Party	Candidate	Votes	%
PAP	Sidek Saniff	13,175	72.46
UF	R. Chetty	5,007	27.54
Majority		8,168	44.92
Registered electors		19,371	
Turnout		18,182	93.86
PAP win (new seat)			

=== Elections in 1980s ===
General Election 1980: Kolam Ayer
Party	Candidate	Votes	%	±%
PAP	Sidek Saniff	16,995	80.35	▲7.89
UF	Mohamed Monsor Rahman	4,155	19.65	N/A
Majority		12,840	60.7	▲15.78
Registered electors		22,775		▲17.57
Turnout		21,150	92.86	▲1.0
PAP hold		Swing	▲7.89	

General Election 1984: Kolam Ayer
Party	Candidate	Votes	%	±%
PAP	Sidek Saniff	12,812	57.91	▼22.44
WP	G S Roy	9,311	42.09	N/A
Majority		5,790	15.82	▼44.88
Registered electors		23,630		▲37.58
Turnout		17,130	93.62	▲0.76
PAP hold		Swing	▼44.88	
