= Cheng San Constituency =

Former electoral division in Singapore

Cheng San Constituency was a single member constituency in Ang Mo Kio, Singapore. It was created in 1980 and merged into Cheng San Group Representation Constituency (GRC) in 1988 following the establishment of GRC and Single Member Constituency (SMC).

== History ==
The constituency was formed by carving from Serangoon Gardens SMC in 1980.

During the 1988 Singaporean general election, following the establishment of GRC and Single Member Constituency (SMC), the constituency was merged into Cheng San GRC.

== Member of Parliament ==
Year	Member	Party
Formation
1980	Lee Yock Suan	PAP
1984	Lee Yock Suan	PAP
Constituency abolished (1988)

== Electoral results ==
Note: The Elections Department does not include rejected votes when calculating the vote shares of candidates. Hence, all candidates' vote shares will total to 100% at any given election (may not appear so in multi-way contests due to rounding).

=== Elections in 1980s ===
General Election 1980
Party	Candidate	Votes	%
PAP	Lee Yock Suan	12,312	75.89
WP	Chong Chee Kwong	3,527	24.11
Majority		8,401	51.78
Total valid votes		16,223	97.30
Rejected ballots		451	2.70
Turnout		16,674	97.83
Registered electors		17,044	
PAP win (new seat)			

General Election 1984
Party	Candidate	Votes	%	±%
PAP	Lee Yock Suan	Unopposed		
Registered electors		17,328		▲1.67
PAP hold				
