= Marine Parade Constituency =

Singaporean single-member constituency formed in 1976

Coordinates: 1.305°N 103.91°E

Marine Parade
- Single Member constituency for the Parliament of Singapore
- Region: Singapore

Current constituency
- Created: 1976
- Seats: 1
- Member: Constituency Abolished
- Town Council: Marine Parade
- Replaced by: Marine Parade GRC

Marine Parade Constituency was a single-member constituency in Marine Parade, Singapore. It was formed in 1976 after the land reclamation works to build Marine Parade were completed and carved out from Joo Chiat Constituency.

Goh Chok Tong made his political debut in the constituency when it was formed in 1976. He would later become the second Prime Minister of Singapore.

In 1988, the constituency was merged into Marine Parade Group Representation Constituency.

== Member of Parliament ==
Year	Member of Parliament	Party
1976	Goh Chok Tong	PAP
1980	Goh Chok Tong	PAP
1984	Goh Chok Tong	PAP

== Electoral results ==
Note: The Elections Department does not include rejected votes when calculating the vote shares of candidates. Hence, all candidates' vote shares will total to 100% at any given election (may not appear so in multi-way contests due to rounding).

=== Elections in 1970s ===
General Election 1976: Marine Parade
Party	Candidate	Votes	%	±%
PAP	Goh Chok Tong	14,418	78.62	
UF	Monsor Rahman	3,922	21.38	
Majority		10,496	57.24	
Turnout		18,779	96.2	
PAP win (new seat)				

=== Elections in 1980s ===
General Election 1980: Marine Parade
Party	Candidate	Votes	%	±%
PAP	Goh Chok Tong	Walkover		
Turnout		21,903		
PAP hold		Swing		

General Election 1984: Marine Parade
Party	Candidate	Votes	%	±%
PAP	Goh Chok Tong	15,228	70.93	
SUF	De Gracias Gertrude M	6,242	29.07	
Majority		8,986	41.86	
Turnout		22,206	94.0	
PAP hold		Swing	N/A	
