= Kaki Bukit Constituency =

Former electoral district in Singapore

Kampong Kembangan
- Single Member constituency for the Parliament of Singapore
- Region: Singapore

Current constituency
- Created: 1980
- Seats: 1
- Member: Constituency Abolished
- Replaced by: Aljunied GRC

Kaki Bukit Constituency was a single member constituency (SMC) in Bedok, Singapore; carved from Kampong Chai Chee division in prior to 1980 elections and was absorbed into the Eunos GRC on 1988 elections.

In 1984, Tan Chee Kien was offered the non-constituency Member of Parliament (NCMP) seat after Madai Puthan Damodaran Nair, a Workers' Party candidate in Jalan Kayu Constituency had declined the offered NCMP seat. Tan declined the seat as well.

== Member of Parliament ==
Year	Member of Parliament	Party
1980	Saidi Shariff	PAP
1984	Chew Heng Ching	PAP

== Electoral results ==
Note: The Elections Department does not include rejected votes when calculating the vote shares of candidates. Hence, all candidates' vote shares will total to 100% at any given election (may not appear so in multi-way contests due to rounding).

=== Elections in 1980s ===
General Election 1980: Kaki Bukit
Party	Candidate	Votes	%	±%
PAP	Saidi Shariff	14,550	72.32	
PKMS	Ibrahim bin Ariff	4,072	20.24	
United People's Front	Atim bin Ismail	1,496	7.44	
Turnout		20,666	96.9	
PAP win (new seat)				

General Election 1984: Kaki Bukit
Party	Candidate	Votes	%	±%
PAP	Chew Heng Ching	10,229	52.28	−20.04
SUF	Tan Chee Kien	9,336	47.72	+47.32
Turnout		16,764	96.4	−20.04
PAP hold		Swing	-7.21	
