= Buona Vista Single Member Constituency =

Former electoral division in Singapore

Buona Vista
- Former Single Member constituency for the Parliament of Singapore
- Region: West Region, Singapore
- Electorate: 14,596 (1991)

Former constituency
- Created: 1976
- Abolished: 1997
- Seats: 1
- Created from: Ulu Pandan Constituency
- Replaced by: Tanjong Pagar GRC

Buona Vista Single Member Constituency (SMC) was a constituency in Singapore. It was established in 1976 from carving out part of Ulu Pandan Constituency and was merged into Tanjong Pagar Group Representation Constituency (GRC) in 1997.

== History ==
During the 1976 Singaporean general election, Buona Vista Constituency was carved out of Ulu Pandan Constituency.

In 1988, following the establishment of group representation constituency (GRC) and single member constituency (SMC), the constituency was known as Buona Vista Single Member Constituency.

During the 1997 Singaporean general election, Buona Vista SMC was merged into Tanjong Pagar GRC.

== Member of Parliament ==
Year	Member	Party
Formation
1976	Ang Kok Peng	PAP
1980	Ang Kok Peng	PAP
1984	Ang Kok Peng	PAP
1988	Peter Sung	PAP
1991	Peter Sung	PAP
Constituency abolished (1997)

== Electoral results ==
Note: The Elections Department does not include rejected votes when calculating the vote shares of candidates. Hence, all candidates' vote shares will total to 100% at any given election (may not appear so in multi-way contests due to rounding).

=== Elections in 1970s ===
General Election 1976
Party	Candidate	Votes	%
PAP	Ang Kok Peng	12,704	82.75
United People's Front	Hashim bin Mukayat	2,649	17.25
Majority		10,055	65.50
Valid ballots		15,353	94.38
Rejected ballots		399	2.45
Turnout		15,752	96.83
Registered electors		16,267	
PAP win (new seat)			

=== Elections in 1980s ===
General Election 1980
Party	Candidate	Votes	%	±%
PAP	Ang Kok Peng	Unopposed		
Registered electors		17,287		▲6.27
PAP hold				

General Election 1984
Party	Candidate	Votes	%	±%
PAP	Ang Kok Peng	Unopposed		
Registered electors		18,041		▲4.36
PAP hold				

General Election 1988
Party	Candidate	Votes	%	±%
PAP	Peter Sung	8,859	61.76	N/A
SDP	Low Yong Nguan	5,037	35.11	N/A
PKMS	Abdul Karim B Abdul Sattar	449	3.13	N/A
Majority		3,822	26.65	N/A
Total valid votes		15,353	98.83	N/A
Rejected ballots		181	1.17	N/A
Turnout		15,534	98.01	N/A
Registered electors		15,850		▼12.14
PAP hold				

=== Elections in 1990s ===
General Election 1991
Party	Candidate	Votes	%	±%
PAP	Peter Sung	10,481	79.42	▲17.66
PKMS	A Karim Sattar	2,716	20.58	▲17.45
Majority		7,765	58.84	▲32.19
Total valid votes		13,197	95.68	▼3.15
Rejected ballots		596	4.32	▲3.15
Turnout		13,793	94.50	▼3.51
Registered electors		14,596		▼7.91
PAP hold		Swing	▲17.66	
