= Kampong Ubi Constituency =

Former Singaporean constituency

Coordinates: 1.329°N 103.9°E

Kampong Ubi
- Single Member constituency for the Parliament of Singapore
- Region: Singapore

Current constituency
- Created: 1968
- Seats: 1
- Member: Constituency Abolished
- Replaced by: Aljunied GRC

Kampong Ubi Single Member Constituency was a constituency in Singapore. It existed from 1968 to 1988 and was merged in 1988 to Aljunied Group Representation Constituency. It carved out of Geylang Serai Constituency.

== Member of Parliament ==
Election	Member of Parliament	Party
1968	Yaacob bin Mohamed	PAP
1972	Yaacob bin Mohamed	PAP
1976	Yaacob bin Mohamed	PAP
1980	Wan Hussin bin Zoohri	PAP
1984	Wan Hussin bin Zoohri	PAP

== Electoral results ==
Note: The Elections Department does not include rejected votes when calculating the vote shares of candidates. Hence, all candidates' vote shares will total to 100% at any given election (may not appear so in multi-way contests due to rounding).

=== Elections in 1960s ===
General Election 1968: Kampong Ubi
Party	Candidate	Votes	%
PAP	Yaacob bin Mohamed	9,797	81.87
Independent	Tay Mook Yong	2,169	18.13
Majority		7,628	63.74
Registered electors		13,434	
Turnout		11,966	89.07
PAP win (new seat)			
