= Clementi Constituency =

Former electoral division in Singapore

Clementi Constituency was a constituency in Singapore. It used to exist from 1980 to 1988, where it merged into Pasir Panjang Group Representation Constituency in 1988. It was carved out from Bukit Timah constituency in 1980.

== Member of Parliament ==
Year	Member of Parliament	Party
1980	Bernard Chen	PAP
1984	Bernard Chen	PAP

== Electoral results ==
Note: The Elections Department does not include rejected votes when calculating the vote shares of candidates. Hence, all candidates' vote shares will total to 100% at any given election (may not appear so in multi-way contests due to rounding).

=== Elections in 1980s ===
General Election 1980: Clementi
Party	Candidate	Votes	%	±%
PAP	Bernard Chen	12,162	85.4	
United People's Front	Munjeet Singh	2,076	14.6	
Majority		10,086	70.8	
Turnout		14,765	97.6	
PAP win (new seat)				

General Election 1984: Clementi
Party	Candidate	Votes	%	±%
PAP	Bernard Chen	Walkover		
Majority				
Turnout		20,890		
PAP hold		Swing		
