= River Valley Constituency =

Historical constituency of Singapore

Coordinates: 1.297°N 103.83°E

River Valley
- Former Single member constituency
- Region: Central Region, Singapore
- Electorate: 9980

Former constituency
- Created: 1959
- Abolished: 1988
- Seats: 1
- Party: People's Action Party
- Members: Lim Cheng Lock (1959–1968); Low Guan Onn (1968–1972); Tan Eng Liang (1972–1980); Tay Eng Soon (1980–1984)
- Created from: Cairnhill Single Member Constituency; Tanglin Single Member Constituency
- Replaced by: Cairnhill Single Member Constituency

River Valley Constituency was a constituency in Singapore. It used to exist from 1959 to 1988. The 1959 election in River Valley remains the record for the closest winning margin in any election in Singapore history.

== History ==
In 1988, the constituency was dissolved following the establishment of Group representation constituency (GRC) and Single Member Constituency (SMC).

== Member of Parliament ==
Election	Member	Party
Formation
Legislative Assembly of Singapore
1959	Lim Cheng Lock	PAP
1963	Lim Cheng Lock	PAP
Parliament of Singapore
1968	Low Guan Onn	PAP
1972	Tan Eng Liang	PAP
1976	Tan Eng Liang	PAP
1980	Tay Eng Soon	PAP
1984	Tay Eng Soon	PAP
Constituency abolished (1988)

== Electoral results ==
Note: The Elections Department does not include rejected votes when calculating the vote shares of candidates. Hence, all candidates' vote shares will total to 100% at any given election (may not appear so in multi-way contests due to rounding).

=== Elections in 1950s ===
General Election 1959: River Valley
Party	Candidate	Votes	%
PAP	Lim Cheng Lock	3,430	36.6
SPA	Soh Ghee Soon	3,425	36.5
LSP	Tan Ek Khoo	2,529	27.0
Majority		5	0.1
Turnout		9,534	90.0
PAP win (new seat)			

=== Elections in 1960s ===
General Election 1963: River Valley
Party	Candidate	Votes	%	±%
PAP	Lim Cheng Lock	5,597	56.7	+20.1
BS	Goh Lam San	2,668	27.0	
SA	Yap Pheng Geck	1,156	11.7	−24.8
UPP	Wong Chung Kit	455	4.6	
Majority		2,929	29.7	
Turnout		9,980	94.8	
PAP hold		Swing		
