= Geylang West Constituency =

Former electoral division in Singapore

Geylang West Constituency was an electoral constituency in Singapore. It used to exist from 1959 to 1988 where it was absorbed into Jalan Besar GRC.

== Member of Parliament ==
Election	Member of Parliament	Party
Legislative Assembly of Singapore
1959	Yong Nyuk Lin	PAP
1963	Yong Nyuk Lin	PAP
Parliament of Singapore
1968	Yong Nyuk Lin	PAP
1972	Yong Nyuk Lin	PAP
1976	Yong Nyuk Lin	PAP
1979	Teh Cheang Wan	PAP
1980	Teh Cheang Wan	PAP
1984	Teh Cheang Wan	PAP

== Electoral results ==
Note : Elections Department Singapore do not include rejected votes for calculation of candidate's vote share. Hence, the total of all candidates' vote share will be 100%.

=== Elections in 1950s ===
General Election 1959
Party	Candidate	Votes	%
PAP	Yong Nyuk Lin	8,923	67.60
SPA	Kwek Sam Hock	4,276	32.40
Majority		4,647	35.20
Registered electors		15,528	
Turnout		13,550	87.26
PAP win (new seat)			

=== Elections in 1960s ===
General Election 1963
Party	Candidate	Votes	%	±%
PAP	Yong Nyuk Lin	6,288	43.63	▼23.97
BS	Un Hon Kun	5,670	39.34	N/A
UPP	Kum Teng Hock	1,541	10.69	N/A
SA	Mohamed bin Haji Yacob	914	6.34	▼26.06
Majority		618	4.29	▼30.91
Registered electors		15,386		▲0.91
Turnout		14,575	94.73	
PAP hold		Swing	▼23.97	

General Election 1968
Party	Candidate	Votes	%	±%
PAP	Yong Nyuk Lin	Unopposed		
Registered electors		14,609		▼5.05
PAP hold				

=== Elections in 1970s ===
General Election 1972
Party	Candidate	Votes	%	±%
PAP	Yong Nyuk Lin	7,320	69.28	N/A
WP	Quek Doh Lam	3,246	30.72	N/A
Majority		4,074	38.56	N/A
Registered electors		11,653		▼20.23
PAP hold				

General Election 1976
Party	Candidate	Votes	%	±%
PAP	Yong Nyuk Lin	11,912	71.18	▲1.90
UF	Lim Tiong Hock	4,822	28.82	N/A
Majority		7,090	42.36	▲3.80
Registered electors		18,101		▲55.33
PAP hold				

By-election 1979
Party	Candidate	Votes	%	±%
PAP	Teh Cheang Wan	Unopposed		
Registered electors		20,874		▲15.32
PAP hold				
