= Thomson Single Member Constituency =

Historical constituency in Singapore

Thomson Single Member Constituency was a constituency in Singapore. The constituency was formed in 1959 and was abolished in 1991

== History ==
In 1959, the Thomson Constituency was formed. In 1988, it was renamed as Thomson Single Member Constituency as part of Singapore's political reforms. In 1991, it was abolished and merged into Thomson Group Representation Constituency.

== Members of Parliament ==
Year	Member of Parliament	Party
Legislative Assembly of Singapore
1959	T. Bani	PAP
1963	Koo Young	BS
Parliament of Singapore
1968	Ang Nam Piau	PAP
1972	Ang Nam Piau	PAP
1976	Ang Nam Piau	PAP
1980	Chau Sik Ting	PAP
1984	Leong Horn Kee	PAP
1988	Leong Horn Kee	PAP

== Electoral results ==
Note: The Elections Department does not include rejected votes when calculating the vote shares of candidates. Hence, all candidates' vote shares will total to 100% at any given election (may not appear so in multi-way contests due to rounding).

=== Elections in 1950s ===
General Election 1959: Thomson
Party	Candidate	Votes	%
PAP	T. Bani	4,978	54.63
LF	Francis Thomas	2,581	28.33
SPA	Yap Chin Choon	1,553	17.04
Majority		2,397	26.3
Registered electors		10,067	
Turnout		9,112	90.51
PAP win (new seat)			

=== Elections in 1960s ===
General Election 1963: Thomson
Party	Candidate	Votes	%	±%
BS	Koo Young	5,292	49.2	
PAP	Jukiri bin Parjo	4,248	39.5	−15.1
UPP	LOO Ka Thiam	1,223	11.4	
Majority		1,044	9.7	
Turnout		10,882	96.0	
BS gain from PAP		Swing		
