= Ang Mo Kio Single Member Constituency =

Former electoral division in Singapore

Coordinates: 1.371°N 103.86°E

Ang Mo Kio
- Former Single Member constituency for the Parliament of Singapore
- Region: Singapore

Former constituency
- Created: 1976
- Abolished: 1991
- Seats: 1
- Member: Constituency Abolished
- Town Council: Ang Mo Kio
- Replaced by: Ang Mo Kio GRC

Ang Mo Kio Single Member Constituency (Traditional Chinese: 宏茂橋單選區;Simplified Chinese: 宏茂桥单选区) was a single member constituency in Ang Mo Kio, Singapore that was formed in 1976 and existed till 1991.

== History ==
In 1976, the constituency was formed from merging parts of Nee Soon, Serangoon Gardens and Thomson constituencies and was known as Ang Mo Kio Constituency.

In 1988, following the establishment of Group representation constituency (GRC) and SMC, it was known as Ang Mo Kio SMC.

In 1991, prior to the general election, the constituency was merged into Ang Mo Kio Group Representation Constituency.

== Member of Parliament ==
Year	Member	Party
Formation
1976	Yeo Toon Chia	PAP
1980	Yeo Toon Chia	PAP
1984	Yeo Toon Chia	PAP
1988	Yeo Toon Chia	PAP
Constituency abolished (1991)

== Electoral results ==
Note: The Elections Department does not include rejected votes when calculating the vote shares of candidates. Hence, all candidates' vote shares will total to 100% at any given election (may not appear so in multi-way contests due to rounding).

=== Elections in 1970s ===
General Election 1976
Party	Candidate	Votes	%
PAP	Yeo Toon Chia	Unopposed	
Registered electors		14,264	
PAP win (new seat)			

=== Elections in 1980s ===
General Election 1980
Party	Candidate	Votes	%	±%
PAP	Yeo Toon Chia	17,436	81.99	N/A
UPF	Ang Bee Lian	3,830	18.01	N/A
Majority		9,483	63.98	N/A
Total valid votes		21,266	97.22	N/A
Rejected ballots		609	2.78	N/A
Turnout		21,875	97.04	N/A
Registered electors		22,542		▲58.03
PAP hold				

General Election 1984
Party	Candidate	Votes	%	±%
PAP	Yeo Toon Chia	9,909	72.75	▼9.24
UPF	Ang Bee Lian	3,711	27.25	▲9.24
Majority		6,198	45.50	▼18.48
Total valid votes		13,620	95.85	▼1.37
Rejected ballots		589	4.15	▲1.37
Turnout		14,209	97.10	▲0.06
Registered electors		14,633		▼35.09
PAP hold		Swing	▼9.24	

General Election 1988
Party	Candidate	Votes	%	±%
PAP	Yeo Toon Chia	13,365	65.49	▼7.26
NSP	Ong Kah Seng	7,044	34.51	N/A
Majority		6,321	30.98	▼14.52
Total valid votes		20,409	97.04	▲1.19
Rejected ballots		621	2.96	▼1.19
Turnout		21,030	96.72	▲3.64
Registered electors		21,744		▲48.59
PAP hold		Swing	▼7.26	

== See also ==
- Ang Mo Kio GRC
