= Elections Department Singapore =

Government agency in Singapore

Elections Department of Singapore

Department overview
- Formed: 1947; 79 years ago
- Jurisdiction: Government of Singapore
- Headquarters: 11 Novena Rise, Singapore 307516
- Employees: 40 (2019)
- Annual budget: S$52 million (2020)
- Minister responsible: Lawrence Wong, Prime Minister
- Department executive: Lim Zhi Yang, Head
- Parent department: Prime Minister's Office
- Child department: Registry of Political Donations
- Website: www.eld.gov.sg
- Agency ID: T08GA0042B

The Elections Department Singapore (ELD), known endonymously as the Elections Department, is a department under the Prime Minister's Office (PMO) of the Government of Singapore which are responsible for overseeing the procedure for elections in Singapore, including parliamentary elections, presidential elections and referendums.

First established in 1947, it sees that elections are fairly carried out and has a supervisory role to safeguard against electoral fraud. It has the power to create constituencies and redistrict them, with the justification of preventing malapportionment.

== History ==
The elections department was established under the Chief Secretary's Office in 1947 when Singapore was a British crown colony. After independence in 1965, the department was subsequently placed under the Ministry of Home Affairs, followed by the Deputy Prime Minister's Office, and is currently under the Prime Minister's Office. In 2003, the department was expanded to include the Registry of Political Donations. In 2021, the department merged its corporate office and training centre into one central location at 11 Novena Rise.

ELD Timeline
Year	Office Location	Operated Under	Key Milestone
1947	Fullerton Building Fullerton Square Today's Fullerton Hotel	Colonial Secretary's Office	
1948	Fullerton Building Fullerton Square Today's Fullerton Hotel	Colonial Secretary's Office	City Council Election
1952	Fullerton Building Fullerton Square Today's Fullerton Hotel	Colonial Secretary's Office	
1952	Singapore Improvement Trust Building Mansoor Street (expunged)	Colonial Secretary's Office	
1953	Singapore Improvement Trust Building Mansoor Street (expunged)	Colonial Secretary's Office	
1953	Fullerton Building Fullerton Square Today's Fullerton Hotel	Colonial Secretary's Office	
1955	Fullerton Building Fullerton Square Today's Fullerton Hotel	Colonial Secretary's Office	First Legislative Assembly General Election
1955	Fullerton Building Fullerton Square Today's Fullerton Hotel	Chief Secretary's Office	First Legislative Assembly General Election
1957	Fullerton Building Fullerton Square Today's Fullerton Hotel	Chief Secretary's Office	
1957	Fort Canning Fort Canning Rise (building has been demolished)	Chief Secretary's Office	
1959	Fort Canning Fort Canning Rise (building has been demolished)	Chief Secretary's Office	
1959	Fort Canning Fort Canning Rise (building has been demolished)	Ministry of Home Affairs	
1962	Fort Canning Fort Canning Rise (building has been demolished)	Ministry of Home Affairs	
1962	Empress Place Building Empress Place Today's Asian Civilisations Museum	Deputy Prime Minister's Office	
1965	Empress Place Building Empress Place Today's Asian Civilisations Museum	Deputy Prime Minister's Office	
1965	Elections Department Building Halifax Road	Deputy Prime Minister's Office	
1968	Elections Department Building Halifax Road	Deputy Prime Minister's Office	First Parliamentary General Election
1968	Elections Department Building Halifax Road	Prime Minister's Office	First Parliamentary General Election
1970	Elections Department Building Halifax Road	Prime Minister's Office	
1970	City Hall St. Andrew Road Today's National Gallery Singapore	Prime Minister's Office	
1987	City Hall St. Andrew Road Today's National Gallery Singapore	Prime Minister's Office	
1987	Treasury Building Shenton Way Today's Temasek Tower	Prime Minister's Office	
1993	Treasury Building Shenton Way Today's Temasek Tower	Prime Minister's Office	First Presidential Election
1994	Treasury Building Shenton Way Today's Temasek Tower	Prime Minister's Office	
1994	Elections Department Building Prinsep Link	Prime Minister's Office	
2021	Novena Rise	Prime Minister's Office	

== Responsibilities ==
=== Presidential and parliamentary elections ===
The department is responsible for the preparation and management of the Presidential and Parliamentary elections and any national referendum in Singapore. Although the President of Singapore has the authority to create group representation constituencies (GRC) from several electoral wards, the Elections Department is generally the government authority which advises the President on which constituencies are created, and which constituencies are redistricted.

=== Political Donations Act ===
The ELD has under its purview the Registry of Political Donations (RPD) since 2003. It is responsible for the administration of the Political Donations Act and campaign spending rules. The main objective of RPD is to prevent foreign funding and potential interference in the domestic politics of Singapore.

=== Registry of Electors ===
Between elections, ELD must ensure that the registers of electors are kept up-to-date. Other responsibilities include the training of election officials, logistical management of election events, informing the public about the electoral system and voting processes and ensuring that all electors have access to the electoral system and voting processes.

=== Other responsibilities ===
The ELD provides secretariat support to the Electoral Boundaries Review Committee (EBRC), formerly the Electoral Boundaries Delineation Committee (ERDC), and election committees such as the Presidential Elections Committee and the Community Committee.

ELD is also responsible for:

- Training election officials,
- Planning for election manpower, premises, logistical and other related requirements for the conduct of elections
- Informing the public about the electoral system and voting processes
- Ensuring all electors have access to the electoral system and voting processes
- Administering the Political Donations Act and campaign spending rules

== Criticism ==
Opposition parties such as the Workers Party (WP) and the Singapore Democratic Party (SDP) in the politics of Singapore has questioned whether there are true, clear separation of powers between the current ruling party of Singapore, the People's Action Party (PAP), and the Elections Department, which is supposed to be a neutral and impartial entity. The absence of an independent electoral commission to manage elections is a subject that has been brought up by many opposition parties.

The Elections Department is a branch under the Prime Minister's Office. The Electoral Boundaries Review Committee is appointed by the Prime Minister; the committee includes a mix of top civil servants and is chaired by the secretary to the Prime Minister. The committee is responsible for the drawing of polling districts and polling sites with pinpoint precision before every election, without the need for Parliamentary approval. Under section 8(1) of the Parliamentary Elections Act, the incumbent Prime Minister may, "from time to time, by notification in the Gazette, specify the names and boundaries of the electoral divisions of Singapore for purposes of elections under this Act".

The opposition argues that the lack of an independent commission results in a higher chance of gerrymandering on behalf of the PAP, by bringing up examples of Eunos GRC after the 1991 Singaporean general election and Cheng San GRC after the 1997 Singaporean general election being redrawn into other constituencies, or single-member-constituencies such as Joo Chiat SMC after the 2011 Singaporean general election being absorbed into bigger GRCs after close electoral fights.

The redrawing of constituencies shortly before each election are often satirised by Singaporeans on social media, satirical and socio-political websites, as well as in theatre especially during election season.

During the 2025 Singaporean general election, Workers' Party WP decided not to contest Marine Parade–Braddell Heights GRC, which resulted in a walkover for the PAP. Justifying the decision, Singh said that the WP had to make the "difficult decision" due to its lack of resources and the extensive boundary changes of the constituency.

== See also ==
- Prime Minister's Office (Singapore)
- Elections in Singapore
