= 6th Parliament of Singapore =

Singaporean parliamentary meeting

| ← | 5th | 7th | → |
Initial composition
Government:
PAP (77)
Opposition:
WP (1)
SDP (1)
Vacant (1)

Overview
- Legislative body: Parliament of Singapore
- Meeting place: Old Parliament House
- Term: 25 February 1985 – 17 August 1988 (3 years, 5 months and 23 days)
- Election: 22 December 1984
- Government: People's Action Party
- Opposition: Workers' Party (until 10 November 1986); Singapore Democratic Party (from 10 November 1986)

Parliament of Singapore
- Members: 79 + 1 NCMP
- Speaker: Yeoh Ghim Seng
- Leader of the House: S. Dhanabalan (until 24 February 1987); Wong Kan Seng (from 25 February 1987)
- Prime Minister: Lee Kuan Yew
- Leader of the Opposition: J. B. Jeyaretnam (until 10 November 1986); Chiam See Tong (from 10 November 1986)
- Party control: PAP supermajority

Sessions
- 1st: 25 February 1985 – 27 January 1986 (11 months and 2 days)
- 2nd: 20 February 1986 – 17 August 1988 (2 years, 5 months and 28 days)

The 6th Parliament of Singapore was a meeting of the Parliament of Singapore. Its first session commenced on 25 February 1985 and was prorogued on 27 January 1986. It commenced its second session on 20 February 1986 and was dissolved on 17 August 1988.

The members of the Sixth Parliament were elected in the 1984 general election. Parliament was controlled by a People's Action Party majority, led by Prime Minister Lee Kuan Yew and his Cabinet. Yeoh Ghim Seng served as Speaker. J. B. Jeyaretnam of the Workers' Party served as the de facto Leader of the Opposition until he was disqualified from Parliament on 10 November 1968 following a conviction over false statements about party funds. This left Chiam See Tong of the Singapore Democratic Party as the sole opposition member in Parliament. With Jeyaretnam's disqualification, this was the last instance where only two parties represented the Parliament until 2015.

The Sixth Parliament saw the implementation of the Non-constituency Member of Parliament (NCMP) scheme, which allowed for the losing opposition candidates which received the highest percentage of votes to be representated in Parliament, in order to ensure that a quota of opposition members in Parliament could be met. For the Sixth Parliament, a minimum number of three opposition members was set, allowing for one NCMP seat to be allocated. The seat was first offered to M. P. D. Nair of the Workers' Party on 24 December 1984, but the offer lapsed on 4 March 1985, without Nair accepting it. The seat was then offered to Tan Chee Kien of the Singapore United Front on 8 March 1985, who rejected it on 28 March 1985. The NCMP seat thus remained vacant for the duration of the Sixth Parliament.

The Sixth Parliament also saw the presence of female MPs for the first time since the resignation of Chan Choy Siong in 1970. Two seats were vacated in 1986 and remained so until the end of the term; the first was Jeyaretnam's, and the second was that of the PAP's Teh Cheang Wan, who committed suicide on 14 December 1986 during an investigation for alleged corruption.

== Results of the 1984 general election ==
| Party | Votes | % | Seats | +/– |
|---|---|---|---|---|
| People's Action Party | 568,310 | 64.83 | 77 | ▲2 |
| Workers' Party | 110,868 | 12.65 | 1 | ▲1 |
| Singapore United Front | 87,237 | 9.95 | 0 | Steady |
| Singapore Democratic Party | 32,102 | 3.66 | 1 | ▲1 |
| United People's Front | 27,217 | 3.10 | 0 | Steady |
| Barisan Sosialis | 24,212 | 2.76 | 0 | Steady |
| Singapore Justice Party | 10,906 | 1.24 | 0 | Steady |
| Singapore Malay National Organisation | 4,768 | 0.54 | 0 | Steady |
| Angkatan Islam Singapura | 359 | 0.04 | 0 | New |
| Independents | 10,586 | 1.21 | 0 | New |
| Total | 876,565 | 100.00 | 79 | ▲4 |
| Valid votes | 876,565 | 97.08 | | |
| Invalid/blank votes | 26,394 | 2.92 | | |
| Total votes | 902,959 | 100.00 | | |
| Registered voters/turnout | 1,495,389 | 95.59 | | |
Source: Singapore Elections

== Officeholders ==
- Speaker: Yeoh Ghim Seng (Joo Chiat, PAP)
- Deputy Speaker: Tan Soo Khoon (Alexandra, PAP), from 1 March 1985
- Prime Minister: Lee Kuan Yew (Tanjong Pagar, PAP)
- Deputy Prime Minister:
  - Goh Chok Tong (Marine Parade, PAP)
  - Ong Teng Cheong (Kim Keat, PAP)
- Leader of the Opposition:
  - J. B. Jeyaretnam (Anson, WP), until 10 November 1986
  - Chiam See Tong (Potong Pasir, SDP), from 10 November 1986
- Leader of the House:
  - S. Dhanabalan (Kallang, PAP), until 24 February 1987
  - Wong Kan Seng (Kuo Chuan, PAP), from 25 February 1987
- Government Party Whip: Lee Yiok Seng (Bukit Panjang, PAP)
- Deputy Government Party Whip:
  - Lee Hsien Loong (Teck Ghee, PAP), until 27 January 1987
  - Eugene Yap (Mountbatten, PAP), from 28 January 1987

== Composition ==
| Political party | Members | |
| Political party | At election | At dissolution |
|---|---|---|
| People's Action Party | 77 | 76 |
| Workers' Party | 1 | 0 |
| Singapore Democratic Party | 1 | 1 |
| Vacant seats | 1 | 3 |
| Total | 80 | 80 |
| Government majority | 75 | 75 |

== Members ==
| Constituency | Member | Party |
|---|---|---|
| Alexandra | Tan Soo Khoon 陈树群 | PAP |
| Aljunied | Chin Harn Tong 钱翰琮 | PAP |
| Ang Mo Kio | Yeo Toon Chia 杨敦清 | PAP |
| Anson | J. B. Jeyaretnam (until 1986) (Note: Jeyaretnam lost his seat on 10 November 1986 following a conviction over false reports about party finances, which resulted in a five-year electoral ban.) ஜே. பி. ஜெயரத்தினம் | WP |
| Ayer Rajah | Tan Cheng Bock 陈清木 | PAP |
| Bedok | S. Jayakumar எஸ். செயக்குமார் | PAP |
| Bo Wen | S. Vasoo எஸ். வாசு | PAP |
| Boon Lay | Goh Chee Wee 吴志伟 | PAP |
| Boon Teck | Ho Tat Kin 何达坚 | PAP |
| Braddell Heights | Goh Choon Kang 吴俊刚 | PAP |
| Brickworks | Ahmad Mattar أحمد مطر | PAP |
| Bukit Batok | Chai Chong Yii 蔡崇语 | PAP |
| Bukit Merah | Lim Chee Onn 林子安 | PAP |
| Bukit Panjang | Lee Yiok Seng 李玉胜 | PAP |
| Bukit Timah | Wang Kai Yuen 王家园 | PAP |
| Buona Vista | Ang Kok Peng 洪国平 | PAP |
| Cairnhill | Wong Kwei Cheong 黄贵祥 | PAP |
| Changi | Teo Chong Tee 张宗治 | PAP |
| Changkat | Aline Wong 黄简丽中 | PAP |
| Cheng San | Lee Yock Suan 李玉全 | PAP |
| Chong Boon | S. Chandra Das எஸ். சந்திர தாஸ் | PAP |
| Chua Chu Kang | Tang See Chim 邓思沾 | PAP |
| Clementi | Bernard Chen 陈天立 | PAP |
| Delta | Yeo Choo Kok 杨子国 | PAP |
| Eunos | Zulkifli Mohammed ذوالکيفلي محمد | PAP |
| Fengshan | Arthur Beng 孟建南 | PAP |
| Geylang Serai | Othman Haron Eusofe عثمان هارون يوسف | PAP |
| Geylang West | Teh Cheang Wan (until 1986) (Note: Teh died by suicide on 14 December 1986, while being investigated for allegedly accepting bribes.) 郑章远 | PAP |
| Henderson | Lai Tha Chai 黎达材 | PAP |
| Hong Kah | Yeo Cheow Tong 姚照东 | PAP |
| Jalan Besar | Lee Boon Yang 李文献 | PAP |
| Jalan Kayu | Heng Chiang Meng 王章明 | PAP |
| Joo Chiat | Yeoh Ghim Seng 杨锦成 | PAP |
| Jurong | Ho Kah Leong 何家良 | PAP |
| Kaki Bukit | Chew Heng Ching 周亨增 | PAP |
| Kallang | S. Dhanabalan எஸ். தநபாலன் | PAP |
| Kampong Chai Chee | Fong Sip Chee 邝摄治 | PAP |
| Kampong Glam | S. Rajaratnam எஸ். ராஜரத்தினம் | PAP |
| Kampong Kembangan | Yatiman Yusof وان حسين زوهري | PAP |
| Kampong Ubi | Wan Hussin Zoohri وان حسين زوهري | PAP |
| Kebun Baru | Lim Boon Heng 林文兴 | PAP |
| Khe Bong | Tang Guan Seng 陈原生 | PAP |
| Kim Keat | Ong Teng Cheong 王鼎昌 | PAP |
| Kim Seng | Yeo Ning Hong 杨林丰 | PAP |
| Kolam Ayer | Sidek Saniff صديق صانف | PAP |
| Kreta Ayer | Richard Hu 胡赐道 | PAP |
| Kuo Chuan | Wong Kan Seng 黄根成 | PAP |
| Leng Kee | Ow Chin Hock 欧进福 | PAP |
| MacPherson | Chua Sian Chin 蔡善进 | PAP |
| Marine Parade | Goh Chok Tong 吴作栋 | PAP |
| Moulmein | Lawrence Sia 谢坤祥 | PAP |
| Mountbatten | Eugene Yap 叶尧清 | PAP |
| Nee Soon | Koh Lip Lin 高立人 | PAP |
| Pasir Panjang | Abbas Abu Amin عباس أبو أمين | PAP |
| Paya Lebar | Philip Tan 陈治洋 | PAP |
| Potong Pasir | Chiam See Tong 詹时中 | SDP |
| Punggol | Ng Kah Ting 黄嘉腾 | PAP |
| Queenstown | Jek Yeun Thong 易润堂 | PAP |
| Radin Mas | Chng Hee Kok 庄熙国 | PAP |
| River Valley | Tay Eng Soon 郑永顺 | PAP |
| Rochore | Toh Chin Chye 杜进才 | PAP |
| Sembawang | Tony Tan 陈庆炎 | PAP |
| Serangoon Gardens | Lau Teik Soon 刘德顺 | PAP |
| Siglap | Abdullah Tarmugi عبد الله تارموعي | PAP |
| Tampines | Phua Bah Lee 潘峇厘 | PAP |
| Tanah Merah | Ibrahim Othman إبراهيم عثمان | PAP |
| Tanglin | E. W. Barker | PAP |
| Tanjong Pagar | Lee Kuan Yew 李光耀 | PAP |
| Teck Ghee | Lee Hsien Loong 李显龙 | PAP |
| Telok Ayer | Ong Pang Boon 王邦文 | PAP |
| Telok Blangah | Koh Lam Son 许南山 | PAP |
| Thomson | Leong Horn Kee 梁汉基 | PAP |
| Tiong Bahru | Ch'ng Jit Koon 庄日昆 | PAP |
| Toa Payoh | Eric Cheong 张润志 | PAP |
| Ulu Pandan | Dixie Tan 陈李慕真 | PAP |
| West Coast | Wan Soon Bee 阮顺美 | PAP |
| Whampoa | Augustine Tan 陈惠兴 | PAP |
| Yio Chu Kang | Lau Ping Sum 刘炳森 | PAP |
| Yuhua | Yu-Foo Yee Shoon 于符喜泉 | PAP |
| Non-constituency; Member of Parliament | Vacant (Note: The Non-constituency Member of Parliament seat was first offered to M. P. D. Nair of the Workers' Party, who rejected it on 4 January 1985. The seat was then offered to Tan See Kien of the Singapore United Front, who rejected it on 28 March 1985.) | |
