= 1991 Singaporean general election =

- 31 August 1991

All 81 directly elected seats in Parliament (and up to 3 NCMPs)
- Registered: 1,692,384 (Note: 844,668 of the 1,692,384 voters were registered in uncontested constituencies, leaving 847,716 voters able to vote.)
- Turnout: 95.03% (▲0.33pp)
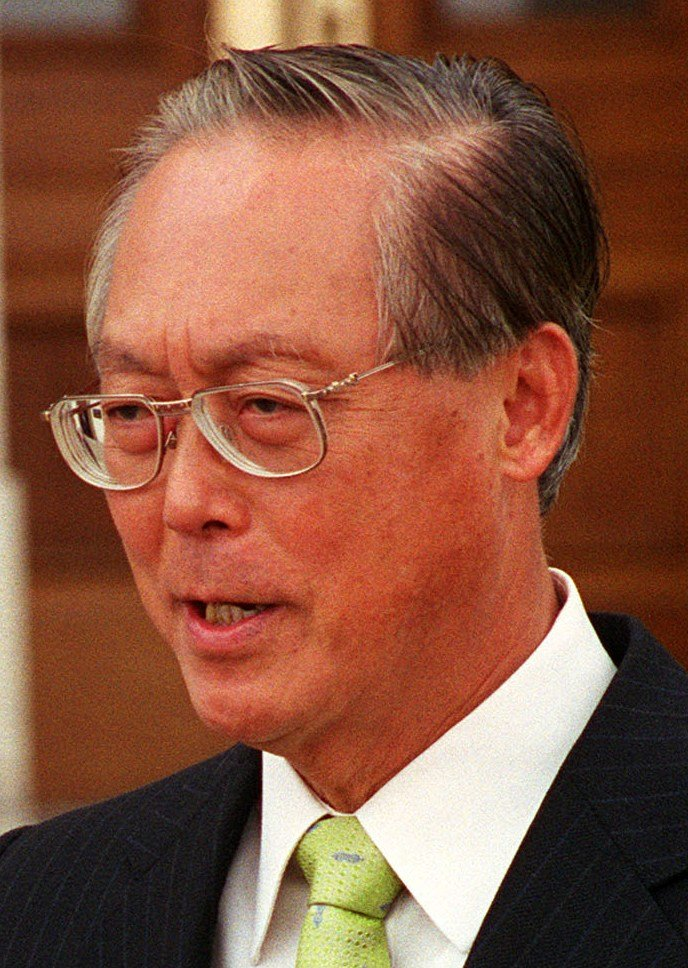

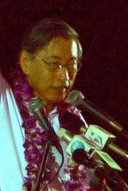

	First party	Second party	Third party
Leader	Goh Chok Tong	Chiam See Tong	J. B. Jeyaretnam
Party	PAP	SDP	WP
Leader's seat	Marine Parade GRC	Potong Pasir SMC	Did not contest
Last election	63.17%, 80 seats	11.80%, 1 seat	16.72%, 1 seat
Seats won	77	3	1
Seat change	▼3	▲2	Steady
Popular vote	477,760	93,856	112,010
Percentage	60.97%	11.98%	14.29%
Swing	▼2.20pp	▲0.18pp	▼2.43pp
- Results by constituency
Prime Minister before election
Goh Chok Tong
PAP
Prime Minister after election
Goh Chok Tong
PAP

General elections were held in Singapore on 31 August 1991 to elect members of Parliament. They were the ninth general elections since the introduction of self-government in 1959 and the seventh since independence in 1965. Despite changes to electoral boundaries, this was the first general election since 1963 that the number of parliamentary seats had remained unchanged. Up to three non-constituency seats (NCMPs) are also available, depending on the results. This was the first election contested by Goh Chok Tong as Prime Minister, following his succession of Lee Kuan Yew in 1990.

Voting was held in only 25 constituencies covering 40 seats, while the other 11 constituencies, comprising 41 seats, went uncontested, with People's Action Party (PAP) candidates returned unopposed on nomination day and formed the government thereafter, for the first time since 1968. During election day, while the PAP won the 36 out of 40 seats they contested, the oppositions made several headway on winning multiple constitutencies in the election by winning four seats in total, with Singapore Democratic Party (SDP) under the leadership of Chiam See Tong scoring 48% of the contested vote share and won two more SMCs of Nee Soon Central and Bukit Gombak in narrow margins, on top of Potong Pasir with a record-best opposition score in post-independence with a vote share of nearly 70%. The Workers' Party, who led by J. B. Jeyaretnam despite being barred from standing for the election, elected its first MP for the first time since 1984 where Low Thia Khiang won the Hougang SMC.

This marked the first time since independence that opposition parties held more than one seat in Parliament, representing the strongest parliamentary presence by the opposition to date at the time. The PAP's popular vote share of 60.97% was also the lowest it had received since independence. As of 2025, the 1991 elections remain the only occasion when no NCMP seats were offered since its creation in 1984.

== Background ==
This was the inaugural election for Prime Minister Goh Chok Tong, who succeeded Lee Kuan Yew on 28 November 1990. Goh decided to call a snap election merely three years after the last election to court a fresh mandate, setting Parliament's shortest term ever.

Certain opposition parties led by Chiam See Tong took a collaborative approach on what it was called a "by-election effect", reassuring voters to safely vote in ease for the opposition as such and in which their decision is not to contest every seats. Ultimately, nearly half of the 81 seats, with only 25 contested constituencies, or 40 seats, were contested, resulting in PAP returning to power on nomination day for the second time since 1968.

== Timeline ==
Date	Event
8 August	Publication of Electoral Boundaries report
14 August	Dissolution of 7th Parliament
21 August	Nomination Day
31 August	Polling day
6 January 1992	Opening of 8th Parliament

== Electoral boundaries ==
=== Existing GRCs ===
Several Group Representation Constituencies (GRCs) were expanded from three-member to four-member teams, with three of the existing GRCs have maintained their boundaries despite the seat increase (those being Eunos, Hong Kah, and Tampines). This adjustment was partly driven by the rapid development of new towns, necessitating changes in electoral boundaries. New divisions were established in areas such as Simei, Jurong West, Bishan and Pasir Ris to reflect their growth. While some existing Single Member Constituencies (SMCs) remained unchanged, others were absorbed into GRCs. Additionally, existing GRCs were restructured to include new electoral divisions.

Constituency	Changes/New Group Representation Constituencies
Aljunied GRC	Absorbed Paya Lebar SMC
Ang Mo Kio GRC	New Constituency; Formed from Ang Mo Kio, Kebun Baru, Teck Ghee and Yio Chu Kang SMCs
Bedok GRC	Absorbed Fengshan and Siglap SMCs; Tanah Merah division was absorbed into Bedok division
Brickworks GRC	Absorbed Clementi and West Coast divisions from Pasir Panjang GRC; Alexandra division was absorbed into Brickworks and Queenstown divisions, while Pasir Panjang division was absorbed into Brickworks division
Cheng San GRC	Absorbed Punggol SMC
Eunos GRC	Pasir Ris division created
Hong Kah GRC	Hong Kah West division was split from Hong Kah South division
Jalan Besar GRC	Absorbed Kallang and a portion of Whampoa SMC
Kampong Glam GRC	New Constituency; Formed from Cairnhill, Kampong Glam, Kim Seng, Moulmein, and a portion of Whampoa SMC
Marine Parade GRC	Absorbed MacPherson SMC
Sembawang GRC	Absorbed Bukit Panjang SMC
Tampines GRC	Split Changkat division to include Changkat South division
Tanjong Pagar GRC	New Constituency; Formed from Henderson, Tanjong Pagar and Telok Blangah SMCs, and a majority of Tiong Bahru GRC
Thomson GRC	New Constituency; Formed from Serangoon Gardens and Thomson SMCs with divisions splitting to form Bishan East and Bishan North, respectively
Toa Payoh GRC	Absorbed Kim Keat SMC

== MPs not standing for re-election ==
With Ng Kah Ting's retirement, this leaves Lee Kuan Yew as the last active MP from the original Parliament who was still contesting (and eventually elected uncontested) in succeeding elections until 2015.

MP	Party	Constituency	Elected in
Abbas Abu Amin	PAP	Pasir Panjang GRC	1988
Abdul Nasser Kamaruddin	PAP	Hong Kah GRC	1988
Augustine Tan	PAP	Whampoa SMC	1970
Chua Sian Chin	PAP	MacPherson SMC	1968
Dixie Tan	PAP	Ulu Pandan SMC	1984
Koh Lam Son	PAP	Telok Blangah SMC	1984
Lawrence Sia	PAP	Moulmein SMC	1968
Ng Kah Ting	PAP	Punggol SMC	1963
Philip Tan	PAP	Paya Lebar SMC	1984
Wan Hussin Zoohri	PAP	Aljunied GRC	1980

== New candidates ==
The election introduced notable cabinet members such as Lim Hng Kiang, Matthias Yao and Koo Tsai Kee, as well as a perennial candidate Zeng Guo Yuan.

New candidate	Party	Constituency
Aminuddin Ami	SJP	Marine Parade GRC
Aziz Ibrahim	PKMS	Ayer Rajah SMC
Chng Wee Hong	NSP	Cheng San GRC
Andy Gan	PAP	Potong Pasir SMC
Harun Abdul Ghani	PAP	Hong Kah GRC
Ho Peng Kee	PAP	Sembawang GRC
Ker Sin Tze	PAP	Aljunied GRC
Koo Tsai Kee	PAP	Tanjong Pagar GRC
Lim Hng Kiang	PAP	Tanjong Pagar GRC
Michael Lim	PAP	Cheng San GRC
Mohamad Maidin Packer	PAP	Aljunied GRC
Ong Seng Kwe	NSP	Tampines GRC
G. K. Niddy	Independent	Leng Kee SMC
K. S. M. Rajasekaran	SJP	Marine Parade GRC
Sarry Hassan	NSP	Tampines GRC
R. Sinnakaruppan	PAP	Kampong Glam GRC
Umar Abdul Hamid	PAP	Ang Mo Kio GRC
Matthias Yao	PAP	Marine Parade GRC
Yen Kim Khooi	Independent	Mountbatten SMC
Zeng Guoyuan	WP	Bukit Timah SMC

== Campaign ==
During the campaign, Prime Minister Goh Chok Tong accused WP's Jufrie Mahmood of Malay chauvinism, citing his comments about the role of the Malay community in Singapore and his use of the phrase "‍Insha'Allah" ("God willing") in a campaign speech. Goh suggested that Jufrie was playing communal politics and as a WP candidate, WP was implied to playing communal politics as well. Goh urged people not to vote for Jufrie in order to help protect inter-racial harmony in Singapore. Jufrie strongly denied that he was a Malay chauvinist and said that he was merely raising "important issues" which he felt needed to be addressed.

== Results ==
A total of five candidates, including one from the PKMS party, forfeited their $6,000 deposit. The narrowest margin in the election occurred in Nee Soon Central, where SDP's Cheo Chai Chen narrowly defeated Ng Pock Too by just 0.66%. PAP's Peter Sung at Buona Vista achieved the best overall result with 79.42% of the vote. Meanwhile, SDP candidate Chiam See Tong in Potong Pasir secured 69.64%, marking the highest vote share ever attained by an opposition candidate in post-independence Singapore. Correspondingly, PAP's Andy Gan received 30.36% in the same constituency, the lowest vote share recorded by any PAP candidate to date. This election was also the last to feature walkovers in a SMC. Voter turnout stood at 95.03%, a slight increase of 0.33% from the previous election, with 805,573 of 847,716 registered voters in contested constituencies casting their ballots out of a total electorate of 1,692,384.

Graph of the party split among 81 seats.
Party	Votes	%	+/–	Seats	+/–
People's Action Party	477,760	60.97	–2.20	77	–3
Workers' Party	112,010	14.29	+0.18	1	+1
Singapore Democratic Party	93,856	11.98	–2.43	3	+2
National Solidarity Party	57,306	7.31	+3.55	0	0
Singapore Justice Party	15,222	1.94	+0.85	0	0
Pertubuhan Kebangsaan Melayu Singapura	12,862	1.64	+0.63	0	0
Independents	14,596	1.86	+0.72	0	0
Total	783,612	100.00	–	81	0
Valid votes	783,612	97.27			
Invalid/blank votes	21,961	2.73			
Total votes	805,573	100.00			
Registered voters/turnout	1,692,384	95.03			
Source: Nohlen et al., Singapore Elections

Opposition parties contested vote
Party	Votes
SDP	48.56%
WP	41.09%
NSP	37.92%
SJP	22.75%
PKMS	16.86%
Independents	14.70%

=== By constituency ===
Constituency	Seats	Electorate	Party	Candidates	Votes	%
Aljunied GRC	4	94,490	People's Action Party	Chin Harn Tong; Ker Sin Tze; Mohamad Maidin Packer; George Yeo	Uncontested	
Ang Mo Kio GRC	4	74,004	People's Action Party	Lau Ping Sum; Lee Hsien Loong; Umar Abdul Hamid; Yeo Toon Chia	Uncontested	
Ayer Rajah SMC	1	21,887	People's Action Party	Tan Cheng Bock	15,038	75.16
Ayer Rajah SMC	1	21,887	Pertubuhan Kebangsaan Melayu Singapura	Aziz Ibrahim	4,971	24.84
Bedok GRC	4	86,246	People's Action Party	Abdullah Tarmugi; Arthur Beng; S. Jayakumar; Tan Soo Khoon	49,109	61.98
Bedok GRC	4	86,246	Workers' Party	A. Balakrishnan; Lim Chiu Liang; Sim Say Chuan; Tan Soo Phuan	30,121	38.02
Boon Lay SMC	1	15,007	People's Action Party	Goh Chee Wee	10,106	73.27
Boon Lay SMC	1	15,007	Pertubuhan Kebangsaan Melayu Singapura	Sahid Sahooman	3,686	26.73
Braddell Heights SMC	1	27,444	People's Action Party	Goh Choon Kang	13,454	52.27
Braddell Heights SMC	1	27,444	Singapore Democratic Party	Sin Kek Tong	12,285	47.73
Brickworks GRC	4	101,440	People's Action Party	Ahmad Mattar; Chay Wai Chuen; Bernard Chen; Wan Soon Bee	Uncontested	
Bukit Batok SMC	1	24,908	People's Action Party	Ong Chit Chung	12,205	51.82
Bukit Batok SMC	1	24,908	Singapore Democratic Party	Kwan Yue Keng	11,347	48.18
Bukit Gombak SMC	1	24,961	Singapore Democratic Party	Ling How Doong	12,037	51.40
Bukit Gombak SMC	1	24,961	People's Action Party	Seet Ai Mee	11,383	48.60
Bukit Merah SMC	1	11,998	People's Action Party	Ch'ng Jit Koon	6,878	61.94
Bukit Merah SMC	1	11,998	Workers' Party	Gopalan Nair	4,046	36.43
Bukit Merah SMC	1	11,998	Independent	Patrick Leong	181	1.63
Bukit Timah SMC	1	24,512	People's Action Party	Wang Kai Yuen	16,080	72.64
Bukit Timah SMC	1	24,512	Workers' Party	Zeng Guoyuan	5,683	25.68
Bukit Timah SMC	1	24,512	Independent	Md Sani Jan	371	1.68
Buona Vista SMC	1	14,596	People's Action Party	Peter Sung	10,481	79.42
Buona Vista SMC	1	14,596	Pertubuhan Kebangsaan Melayu Singapura	Abdul Karim Abdul Sattar	2,716	20.58
Changi SMC	1	24,886	People's Action Party	Teo Chong Tee	12,292	53.00
Changi SMC	1	24,886	Workers' Party	Tan Bin Seng	10,901	47.00
Cheng San GRC	4	92,979	People's Action Party	S. Chandra Das; Heng Chiang Meng; Lee Yock Suan; Michael Lim	54,963	64.05
Cheng San GRC	4	92,979	National Solidarity Party	Chng Chin Siah; Chng Wee Hong; Gertrude De Gracias; Pok Lee Chuan	30,849	35.95
Chua Chu Kang SMC	1	22,797	People's Action Party	Low Seow Chay	14,489	68.44
Chua Chu Kang SMC	1	22,797	Independent	Kwek Guan Kwee	5,071	23.95
Chua Chu Kang SMC	1	22,797	Independent	Harry Baptist	1,611	7.61
Eunos GRC	4	92,728	People's Action Party	Chew Heng Ching; Charles Chong; Sidek Saniff; Tay Eng Soon	45,833	52.38
Eunos GRC	4	92,728	Workers' Party	Lee Siew Choh; Jufrie Mahmood; Neo Choon Aik; Wee Han Kim	41,673	47.62
Hong Kah GRC	4	64,712	People's Action Party	John Chen; Kenneth Chen; Harun Abdul Ghani; Yeo Cheow Tong	Uncontested	
Hougang SMC	1	21,476	Workers' Party	Low Thia Khiang	10,621	52.82
Hougang SMC	1	21,476	People's Action Party	Tang Guan Seng	9,487	47.18
Jalan Besar GRC	4	82,615	People's Action Party	Choo Wee Khiang; Lee Boon Yang; Peh Chin Hua; Zulkifli Mohammed	Uncontested	
Jurong SMC	1	31,246	People's Action Party	Ho Kah Leong	18,843	64.32
Jurong SMC	1	31,246	Workers' Party	John Gan	8,965	30.60
Jurong SMC	1	31,246	Pertubuhan Kebangsaan Melayu Singapura	Mohamed Awang	1,489	5.08
Kampong Glam GRC	4	73,317	People's Action Party	Loh Meng See; R. Sinnakaruppan; Wong Kwei Cheong; Yeo Ning Hong	Uncontested	
Kreta Ayer SMC	1	17,310	People's Action Party	Richard Hu	Uncontested	
Leng Kee SMC	1	19,027	People's Action Party	Ow Chin Hock	13,331	76.57
Leng Kee SMC	1	19,027	Independent	G. K. Niddy	4,080	23.43
Marine Parade GRC	4	74,032	People's Action Party	Goh Chok Tong; Lim Chee Onn; Othman Haron Eusofe; Matthias Yao	51,685	77.25
Marine Parade GRC	4	74,032	Singapore Justice Party	Aminuddin Ami; K. S. M. Rajasekaran; A. R. Suib; Theng Chin Eng	15,222	22.75
Mountbatten SMC	1	15,497	People's Action Party	Eugene Yap	11,029	77.95
Mountbatten SMC	1	15,497	Independent	Yen Kim Khooi	3,119	22.05
Nee Soon Central SMC	1	26,806	Singapore Democratic Party	Cheo Chai Chen	12,709	50.33
Nee Soon Central SMC	1	26,806	People's Action Party	Ng Pock Too	12,541	49.67
Nee Soon South SMC	1	27,722	People's Action Party	Koh Lip Lin	13,719	52.76
Nee Soon South SMC	1	27,722	Singapore Democratic Party	Low Yong Nguan	12,284	47.24
Potong Pasir SMC	1	19,263	Singapore Democratic Party	Chiam See Tong	12,582	69.64
Potong Pasir SMC	1	19,263	People's Action Party	Andy Gan	5,486	30.36
Sembawang GRC	4	117,951	People's Action Party	Ho Peng Kee; K. Shanmugam; Lee Yiok Seng; Tony Tan	Uncontested	
Tampines GRC	4	69,801	People's Action Party	Chng Hee Kok; Mah Bow Tan; Aline Wong; Yatiman Yusof	38,844	59.48
Tampines GRC	4	69,801	National Solidarity Party	Ong Seng Kwe; Rasiah Thiagarajah; Sarry Hassan; Ken Sunn	26,457	40.52
Tanglin SMC	1	16,801	People's Action Party	Lew Syn Pau	9,113	68.52
Tanglin SMC	1	16,801	Singapore Democratic Party	Jimmy Tan	4,022	30.25
Tanglin SMC	1	16,801	Independent	M. G. Guru	163	1.23
Tanjong Pagar GRC	4	86,944	People's Action Party	Koo Tsai Kee; Lee Kuan Yew; Lim Hng Kiang; S. Vasoo	Uncontested	
Thomson GRC	4	68,294	People's Action Party	Wong Kan Seng; Ibrahim Othman; Lau Teik Soon; Leong Horn Kee	Uncontested	
Toa Payoh GRC	4	63,591	People's Action Party	Ong Teng Cheong; S. Dhanabalan; Davinder Singh; Ho Tat Kin	Uncontested	
Ulu Pandan SMC	1	22,299	People's Action Party	Lim Boon Heng	11,426	56.41
Ulu Pandan SMC	1	22,299	Singapore Democratic Party	Ashleigh Seow	8,828	43.59
Yuhua SMC	1	18,797	People's Action Party	Yu-Foo Yee Shoon	9,945	56.16
Yuhua SMC	1	18,797	Singapore Democratic Party	Toh Kim Kiat	7,762	43.84
Source: ELD

== Incumbents defeated ==
Incumbent		Constituency	Elected in	Winner	
Name	Party	Constituency	Elected in	Name	Party
Ng Pock Too	PAP	Nee Soon Central SMC	1988	Cheo Chai Chen	SDP
Seet Ai Mee	PAP	Bukit Gombak SMC	1988	Ling How Doong	SDP
Tang Guan Seng	PAP	Hougang SMC	1984	Low Thia Khiang	WP

== Aftermath ==
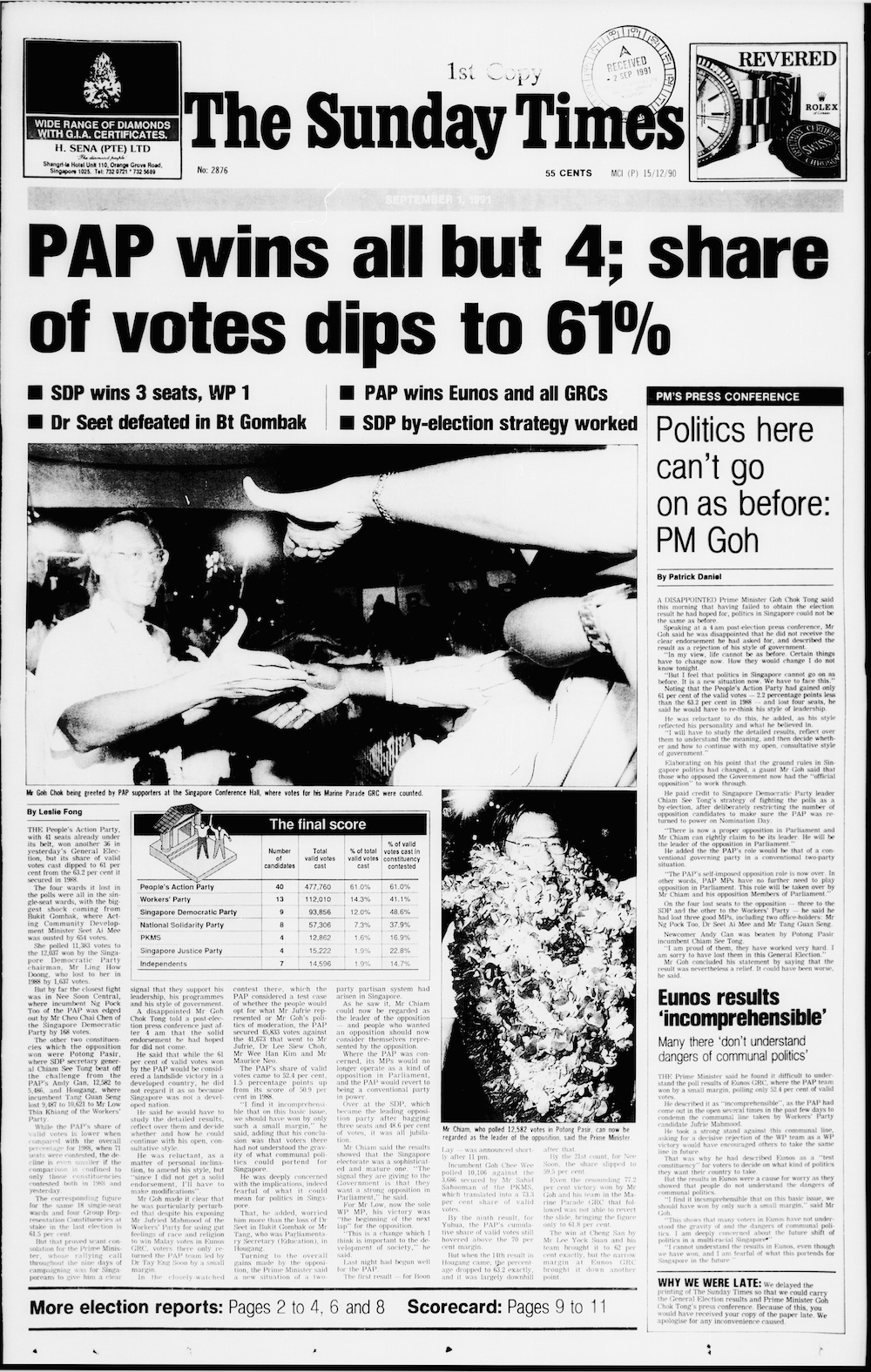
The headline on page 1 of The Sunday Times on 1 September

An unprecedented four seats were won by the opposition, the biggest number since the 1963 election, and the PAP share of votes fell for the third consecutive time since 1984, down to then lowest share of 60.97%. The SDP clocked in the best performance for an opposition party at 48.56% of the total votes in seats that they contested (a record at the time of the election) and became the main opposition party in Parliament, representing with three seats including the seat of Potong Pasir SMC by leader Chiam See Tong with a record 69.64% of the votes. The three incumbents who were defeated in the election were one-term MPs, including the first woman acting cabinet minister Seet Ai Mee, as well as Ng Pock Too and Tang Guan Seng; only Tang returned to the 1997 election as a member in Ang Mo Kio GRC; coincidentally, all three of the constituencies that changed hands were first created in the last election (Nee Soon South SMC was also another SMC created in the same election, but was however retained by the PAP).

Including the four elected opposition seats, 12 constituencies saw oppositions secured at least 40% of the vote, eight of which had a margin of less than 5% (including the PAP narrowly winning in Changi SMC (47.00%), Nee Soon South SMC (47.24%), Eunos GRC (47.62%), Braddell Heights SMC (47.73%) and Bukit Batok SMC (48.18%)), which highlighted the rising support for alternative parties and reflected a significant shift in public sentiment against the PAP's policies at the time. Despite the "by-election effect", opposition candidates narrowly missed out on winning additional seats beyond their final tally. These close outcomes highlighted the momentum the opposition could build despite the PAP's efforts to maintain a significant advantage, even though it ultimately fell short of securing greater parliamentary representation.

The WP made its second in-road into the legislature with the victory of its organising secretary Low Thia Khiang, who previously contested Tiong Bahru GRC in the last election and Hougang SMC on this election, who would years later become WP secretary-general and leader from 2001 to 2018. In a documentary by Low on his Hougang released in 2024, Low remarked that he had also considered contesting Changi SMC, but chose Hougang to make way for Tan Bin Seng to contest there due to familiarities. Hougang would go on to become the longest-serving opposition safe seat in Singapore for decades to come even after he left Hougang in 2011.

At a post-election press conference on the night of 31 August, Goh attributed the swing against the PAP to his "open and consultative style of government" and pledged to re-evaluate his style. Since the introduction of the Non-Constituency Member of Parliament scheme in 1984, this was the first election (and to date the only as of 2025) no NCMP seats were offered since four elected opposition seats exceeded the minimum of three NCMP seats allotted; this led to the eventual retirement of Lee Siew Choh in 1993.

While both deputy prime ministers Ong Teng Cheong and Lee Hsien Loong were undergoing treatment for cancer, Goh called a by-election in his own constituency just a year after the general election. He justified the move as a strategic opportunity for "political self-renewal", aiming to attract individuals of "ministerial calibre" to join the PAP government. The by-election also coincided with the expiry of opposition politician J. B. Jeyaretnam's political ban, creating a potential opening for his return to electoral politics.
