= 1988 Singaporean general election =

- 3 September 1988

All 81 directly elected seats in Parliament (and up to 3 NCMPs)
- Registered: 1,669,013 (Note: 219,175 of the 1,669,013 voters were registered in uncontested constituencies, leaving 1,449,838 voters able to vote.)
- Turnout: 94.70% (▼0.95pp)
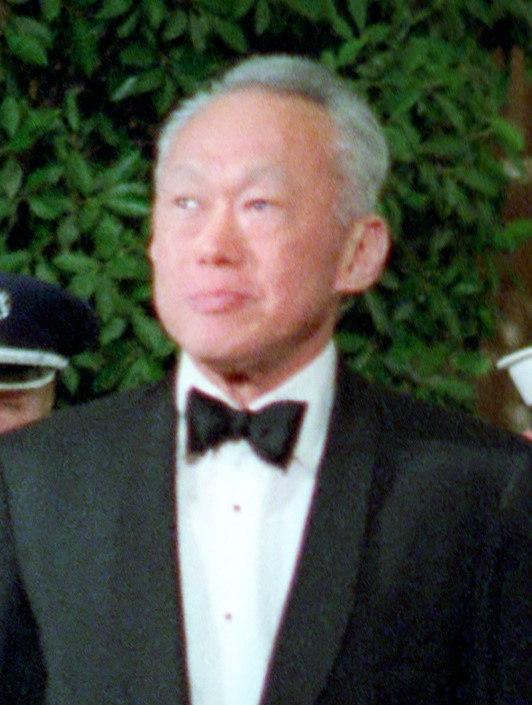

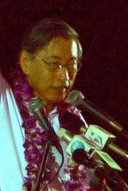
	First party	Second party	Third party
Leader	Lee Kuan Yew	J. B. Jeyaretnam	Chiam See Tong
Party	PAP	WP	SDP
Leader's seat	Tanjong Pagar SMC	Did not contest	Potong Pasir SMC
Last election	64.83%, 77 seats	12.65%, 1 seat	3.66%, 1 seat
Seats won	80	1	1
Seat change	▲3	Steady	Steady
Popular vote	848,029	224,473	158,341
Percentage	63.17%	16.72%	11.80%
Swing	▼1.66pp	▲4.07pp	▲8.14pp
- Results by constituency
Prime Minister before election
Lee Kuan Yew
PAP
Prime Minister after election
Lee Kuan Yew
PAP

General elections were held in Singapore on 3 September 1988 to elect members of Parliament. They were the eighth general elections since the introduction of self-government in 1959 and the sixth since independence in 1965. This election was Lee Kuan Yew's final general election as Prime Minister before he passed the leadership to Deputy Prime Minister Goh Chok Tong in 1990.

The elections were notable for the debut of Group Representation Constituencies (GRCs), a new electoral arrangement introduced by the government. GRCs required candidates to contest in teams, with the inclusion of at least one member from a minority ethnic community. The scheme began with constituencies represented by teams of three Members of Parliament. While presented as a safeguard for multiracialism, the system was heavily criticised by opposition politicians and parties for increasing the barriers to entry for smaller parties, who found it difficult to field sufficiently strong teams to contest effectively in GRCs.

The People's Action Party (PAP) won all but one of the 81 parliamentary seats, with Chiam See Tong of the Singapore Democratic Party (SDP), winning his seat in Potong Pasir SMC; a single Non-constituency Member of Parliament (NCMP) seat was awarded to Lee Siew Choh from the Workers' Party (WP), who had contested in Eunos GRC. He became the first opposition politician to accept an NCMP seat, following previous rejections of such offers in 1984. In addition, while the total number of eligible voters had exceeded one million in 1976, this election marked the first occasion where over one million voters were able to cast their ballots in contested constituencies.

Not counting NCMPs, the 1988 election was the last election to date where the WP had no elected MPs, and it was also the last election until 2011 where only one opposition party would win elected MPs. It was also the last election until 2006 where the a majority of seats are contested in the election, as only 11 seats were uncontested, its fewest since 1972.

== Background ==
In 1986, the PAP government introduced Town Councils (TC). Unlike the former City Council, which was abolished in 1959 and held separate local elections, TCs do not operate through distinct electoral mandates. Instead, local administrative responsibilities are delegated to elected Members of Parliament through general elections. This move coincided with the establishment of Group Representation Constituencies (GRC), a system based on the plurality general ticket method. GRCs were introduced with the stated aim of guaranteeing ethnic minority representation in Parliament. However, the scheme was heavily criticised by opposition politicians and parties, who argued that it created significant barriers to electoral competition. GRCs were initially formed as constituencies represented by teams of three members. Additionally, this election marked a procedural change in the handling of electoral boundaries. For the first time, alterations to electoral divisions were approved directly by the Prime Minister's Office, rather than being debated and passed in Parliament through a formal bill.

The opposition landscape also evolved significantly during this period. Workers' Party (WP) absorbed both the Barisan Sosialis and the Singapore United Front, positioning itself as the dominant opposition party. However, WP's Secretary-General J. B. Jeyaretnam was ineligible to contest in this general election, having been barred for five years in 1986 after being convicted for falsely declaring the party's accounts. He had previously served as MP for Anson from 1981 until his seat was vacated in 1986. Under the Constitution of Singapore at the time, an MP must vacate their seat if fined S$2,000 or more or sentenced to 12 months or more in jail. The fine quantum was increased to S$10,000 in 2022. Jeyaretnam consistently maintained that his convictions were politically motivated. WP also formed a cooperative alliance with the Malay–based party Pertubuhan Kebangsaan Melayu Singapura (PKMS), creating a united faction ahead of the election. On 6 March 1987, the National Solidarity Party (NSP) was established by Kum Teng Hock, a former member of the ruling PAP, and Soon Kia Seng, a former chairman of the SDP. They became the party's founding President and Secretary-General respectively.

== Timeline ==
Date	Event
14 June	Publication of Electoral Boundaries report
17 August	Dissolution of 6th Parliament
24 August	Nomination Day
3 September	Polling Day
16 September	Non-constituency Member of Parliament posts declared
9 January 1989	Opening of 7th Parliament

== Electoral boundaries ==
In addition to the creation of the Group Representation Constituency (GRC) scheme, single member constituencies (SMC) were either formed from or absorbed to neighboring constituencies due to development and electorate.

Constituency	Changes
Formation of Group Representation Constituencies
Aljunied GRC	Formed from Aljunied, Kampong Kembangan and Kampong Ubi Constituencies
Bedok GRC	Formed from Bedok, Kampong Chai Chee and Tanah Merah Constituencies
Brickworks GRC	Formed from Alexandra, Brickworks and Queenstown Constituencies
Cheng San GRC	Formed from Cheng San, Chong Boon and Jalan Kayu Constituencies
Eunos GRC	Formed from Eunos, Kaki Bukit and a portion of Tampines Constituencies (the latter was renamed to Tampines North SMC)
Hong Kah GRC	Formed from parts of Bukit Batok (Hong Kah North), Hong Kah (Hong Kah Central) and Yuhua Constituencies (Hong Kah South)
Jalan Besar GRC	Formed from Geylang West, Jalan Besar and Kolam Ayer Constituencies.
Marine Parade GRC	Formed from Geylang Serai, Joo Chiat and Marine Parade Constituencies.
Pasir Panjang GRC	Formed from Clementi, Pasir Panjang and West Coast Constituencies.
Sembawang GRC	Formed from parts of Nee Soon (Chong Pang and Nee Soon East) and most of Sembawang SMCs; Nee Soon Central and Nee Soon South were subsumed into its own SMCs
Tampines GRC	Formed from Changkat and Tampines Constituencies (the latter was divided into Tampines Changkat, Tampines East and Tampines West)
Tiong Bahru GRC	Formed from Delta, Henderson, Tiong Bahru and Radin Mas Constituencies; Delta was absorbed into Tiong Bahru division.
Toa Payoh GRC	Formed from Boon Teck, Khe Bong, Kuo Chuan and Toa Payoh Constituencies; Khe Bong was absorbed into Boon Teck division.
New Single Member Constituencies
Bukit Gombak SMC	Carved out from Bukit Batok Constituency
Hougang SMC	Carved out from Punggol Constituency
Nee Soon Central SMC; Nee Soon South SMC	Carved out from Nee Soon Constituency
Defunct Constituencies
Anson Constituency	Absorbed into Tanjong Pagar SMC
Bo Wen Constituency	Absorbed into Ang Mo Kio SMC
River Valley Constituency	Absorbed into Cairnhill SMC
Rochore Constituency	Absorbed into Kampong Glam SMC
Telok Ayer Constituency	Absorbed into Kreta Ayer SMC

== MPs not standing for re-election ==
13 MPs retired ahead of the election per the party's renewal, which include Deputy Prime Minister Toh Chin Chye and Senior Minister S. Rajaratnam. Before that, two other MPs had vacated but neither by-elections are called, which were J. B. Jeyaretnam (Anson) and Minister Teh Cheang Wan (Geylang West).

MP	Party	Constituency	Elected in
Ang Kok Peng	PAP	Buona Vista	1972
E. W. Barker	PAP	Tanglin	1963
Chai Chong Yii	PAP	Bukit Batok	1972
Eric Cheong	PAP	Toa Payoh	1968
Fong Sip Chee	PAP	Kampong Chai Chee	1963
Jek Yeun Thong	PAP	Queenstown	1963
Lai Tha Chai	PAP	Henderson	1972
Ong Pang Boon	PAP	Telok Ayer	1959
Phua Bah Lee	PAP	Tampines	1968
S. Rajaratnam	PAP	Kampong Glam	1959
Tang See Chim	PAP	Chua Chu Kang	1966
Toh Chin Chye	PAP	Rochore	1959
Yeo Choo Kok	PAP	Delta	1970

== New candidates ==
The election introduced certain prominent members such as George Yeo and K Shanmugam, as well as a future WP and opposition leader Low Thia Khiang, who made his debut in Tiong Bahru Group Representation Constituency.

New candidate	Party	Constituency
Abdul Karim Abdul Sattar	PKMS	Buona Vista SMC
Abdul Malik Ali	NSP	Tampines GRC
Abdul Nasser Kamaruddin	PAP	Hong Kah GRC
Abdul Rasheed Abdul Kuthus	SDP	Punggol SMC
Harry Baptist	Independent	Serangoon Gardens
Chan Yeng Cheong	NSP	Tampines GRC
Chay Wai Chuen	PAP	Brickworks GRC
John Chen	PAP	Hong Kah GRC
Kenneth Chen	PAP	Potong Pasir SMC
Cheo Chai Chen	SDP	Nee Soon Central SMC
David Chew	SDP	Paya Lebar SMC
Davinder Singh	PAP	Toa Payoh GRC
Chiam Pan Boon	Independent	Mountbatten SMC
Chiam Yeow Juan	WP	Changi SMC
Charles Chong	PAP	Sembawang GRC
Choo Wee Khiang	PAP	Marine Parade GRC
Frederick De Wind	WP	Kampong Glam SMC
Giam Lai Cheng	UPF	Nee Soon Central SMC
Goh Seng Soon	WP	Chua Chu Kang SMC
Goh Teng Hoon	WP	Brickworks GRC
Gopalan Nair	WP	Tiong Bahru GRC
M. G. Guru	Independent	Tanjong Pagar SMC
Hong Hai	PAP	Bedok GRC
Ismail Yaacob	WP	Brickworks GRC
Koh Lam Son	PAP	Telok Blangah
Kwan Yue Keng	SDP	Bukit Batok SMC
Kwek Guan Kwee	SDP	Bukit Panjang SMC
Patrick Leong	Independent	Teck Ghee SMC
Lew Syn Pau	PAP	Tanglin SMC
Lim Chiu Liang	WP	Hougang SMC
Lim Lye Soon	WP	Tiong Bahru GRC
Loh Fook Cheong	WP	Kreta Ayer SMC
Loh Meng See	PAP	Kampong Glam SMC
Low Seow Chay	PAP	Chua Chu Kang SMC
Low Thia Khiang	WP	Tiong Bahru GRC
Edmund Richard Marsh	WP	Jalan Besar GRC
Mohamed Affendy Abdul Rahim	NSP	Kebun Baru SMC
Mohamed Awang	PKMS	Jurong SMC
Mohamed Idris	WP	Jalan Besar GRC
Mohd Khalit Mohd Baboo	WP	Eunos GRC
Saraswathy Murugason	WP	Bedok GRC
Neo Choon Aik	SDP	Aljunied GRC
Ng Teck Siong	SDP	Thomson SMC
Ong Chit Chung	PAP	Bukit Batok SMC
Ong Kah Seng	NSP	Ang Mo Kio SMC
Peh Chin Hua	PAP	Jalan Besar GRC
Pok Lee Chuen	WP	Bukit Merah SMC
Rasiah Thiagarajah	NSP	Yio Chu Kang SMC
Salleh Mohd Bawthan	PKMS	Boon Lay SMC
Seet Ai Mee	PAP	Bukit Gombak SMC
Ashleigh Seow	SDP	Aljunied GRC
Francis Seow	WP	Eunos GRC
K. Shanmugam	PAP	Sembawang GRC
Sin Kek Tong	SDP	Braddell Heights SMC
George Sita	SDP	Ulu Pandan SMC
Peter Sung	PAP	Buona Vista SMC
Ken Sunn	NSP	Whampoa SMC
Jimmy Tan	SDP	Cairnhill SMC
Tan Song Gek	WP	Ayer Rajah SMC
Tan Soo Phuan	WP	Telok Blangah SMC
Theng Chin Eng	SJP	Marine Parade GRC
Toh Keng Thong	WP	Jalan Besar GRC
Toh Kim Kiat	SDP	Yuhua SMC
Wee Han Kim	WP	Pasir Panjang GRC
George Yeo	PAP	Aljunied GRC
Yong Chu Leong	SDP	Nee Soon South SMC

== Results ==
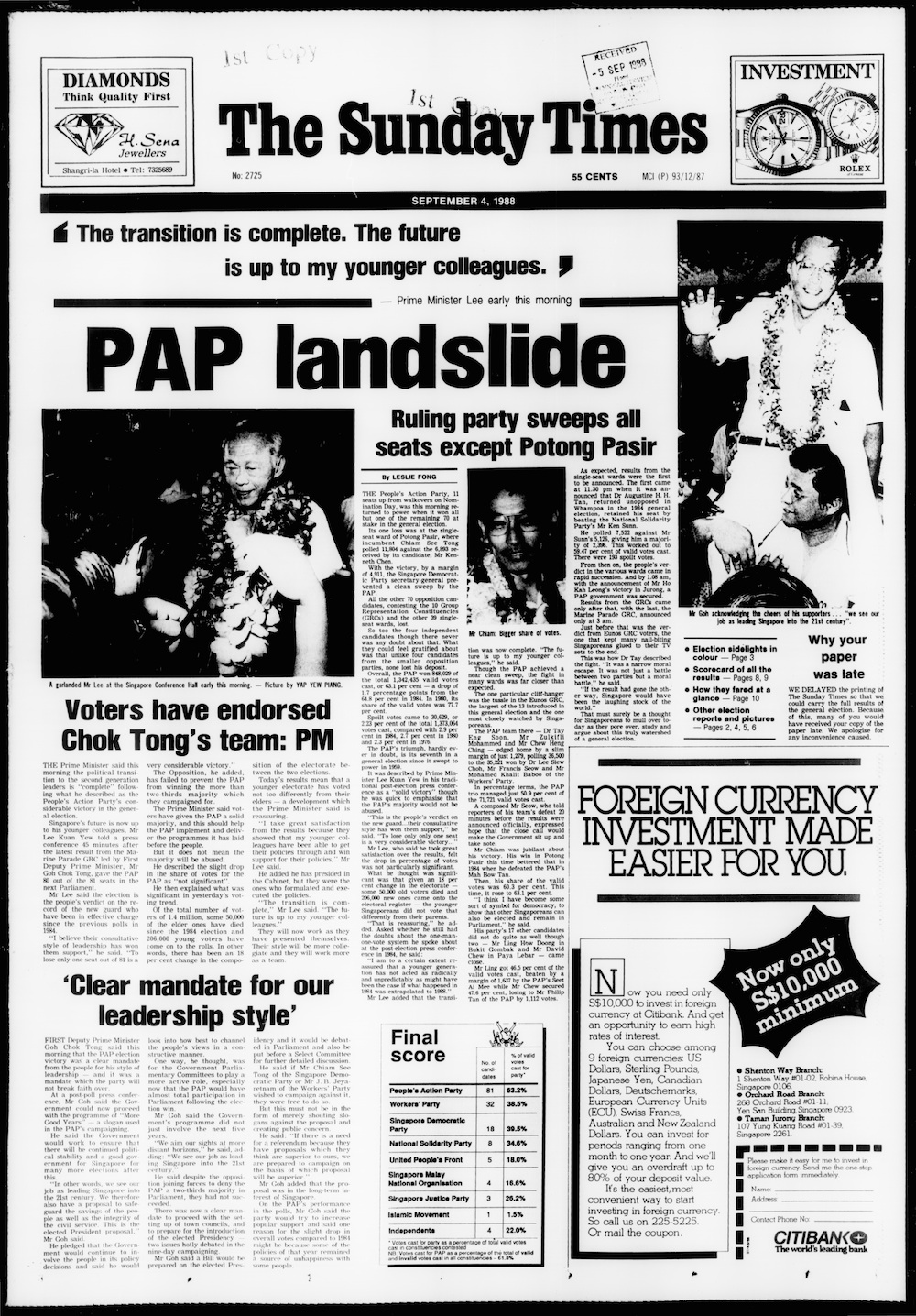
The front page of The Straits Times on 4 September

For the first time since independence, voter turnout experienced a decline, with 94.70 percent of voters in the contested constituencies casting their ballots. This represented a decrease of 0.95 percent from the previous general election. The PAP also recorded a fall in its popular vote share for the second consecutive election, dropping by 1.66 percentage points to 63.17 percent. Lee Kuan Yew's Tanjong Pagar once again emerged as the PAP's strongest-performing constituency, achieving 81.60 percent of the vote. It was the only constituency to secure more than 80 percent of votes, making it the top-performing ward for the fifth time in six elections.

With SDP leader Chiam See Tong winning the sole opposition seat in Potong Pasir, two Non-constituency MP seats were offered to former solicitor-general and Law Society president Francis Seow, and veteran politician Lee Siew Choh. Both stood under the banner of the Workers' Party (WP) in Eunos GRC. Their campaign drew attention for openly criticising the PAP over alleged irregularities in financial matters, prompting Minister of State Tay Eng Soon to head the PAP team contesting Eunos.

Ultimately, the PAP won the constituency with 50.89 percent of the vote, making it the election's most marginal victory with a winning margin of only 1.78 percent. As the best-performing opposition team to have lost, the WP team in Eunos qualified for the NCMP scheme. Seow, however, fled Singapore on 17 December to avoid arrest and was disqualified from taking up the seat. He had earlier been detained for 72 days without trial under the Internal Security Act (ISA), following accusations of receiving political campaign funding from the United States and facing charges of tax evasion. Lee Siew Choh accepted the NCMP offer, becoming Singapore's first NCMP and marking his return to Parliament after a 25-year absence having previously served as a legislator for both the PAP and later the Barisan Sosialis (BS).

The opposition's overall popular vote share set several new records in this election. The WP secured 16.72 percent of the vote, the highest post-independence performance by any opposition party at the time. Conversely, Angkatan Islam Singapura (ANGKASA) recorded a vote share of just 1.50 percent, the lowest in post-independence history until it was surpassed in the 2025 election by the National Solidarity Party with 1.19 percent of the contested vote. Nonetheless, ANGKASA's overall national vote share of 0.02 percent remained the lowest ever recorded. A total of five candidates forfeited their $4,000 election deposits.

Popular vote
1. PAP (63.2%)
2. WP (16.7%)
3. SDP (11.8%)
4. NSP (3.76%)
5. Others (4.56%)
Elected seats won
1. 11 seats (PAP; uncontested) (13.6%)
2. 69 seats (PAP; contested) (85.2%)
3. 1 seat (SDP) (1.23%)

Party	Votes	%	+/–	Seats	+/–
People's Action Party	848,029	63.17	–1.66	80	+3
Workers' Party	224,473	16.72	+8.14	1	0
Singapore Democratic Party	158,341	11.80	+4.07	1	0
National Solidarity Party	50,432	3.76	New	0	New
United People's Front	17,282	1.29	–1.81	0	0
Singapore Justice Party	14,660	1.09	–0.15	0	0
Pertubuhan Kebangsaan Melayu Singapura	13,526	1.01	+0.47	0	0
Angkatan Islam Singapura	280	0.02	–0.02	0	0
Independents	15,412	1.15	–0.06	0	0
Total	1,342,435	100.00	–	82	+2
Valid votes	1,342,435	97.77			
Invalid/blank votes	30,629	2.23			
Total votes	1,373,064	100.00			
Registered voters/turnout	1,669,013	94.70			
Source: Singapore Elections

Opposition parties contested vote
Party	Votes
SDP	39.46%
WP	38.53%
NSP	34.61%
SJP	26.19%
Independents	22.04%
UPF	17.98%
PKMS	16.56%
ANGKASA	1.50%

=== By constituency ===
Constituency	Seats	Electorate	Party	Candidates	Votes	%
Aljunied GRC	3	65,351	People's Action Party	Chin Harn Tong; Wan Hussin Zoohri; George Yeo	34,020	56.33
Aljunied GRC	3	65,351	Singapore Democratic Party	Jufrie Mahmood; Neo Choon Aik; Ashleigh Seow	26,375	43.67
Ang Mo Kio SMC	1	14,633	People's Action Party	Yeo Toon Chia	13,365	65.49
Ang Mo Kio SMC	1	14,633	National Solidarity Party	Ong Kah Seng	7,044	27.25
Ayer Rajah SMC	1	22,532	People's Action Party	Tan Cheng Bock	14,824	69.55
Ayer Rajah SMC	1	22,532	Workers' Party	Tan Song Gek	6,489	30.45
Bedok GRC	3	54,969	People's Action Party	Hong Hai; Ibrahim Othman; S. Jayakumar	28,266	54.92
Bedok GRC	3	54,969	Workers' Party	Gertrude De Gracias; Saraswathy Murugason; Seow Khee Leng	23,203	45.08
Boon Lay SMC	1	16,646	People's Action Party	Goh Chee Wee	11,317	71.97
Boon Lay SMC	1	16,646	Pertubuhan Kebangsaan Melayu Singapura	Salleh Mohd Bawthan	4,408	28.03
Braddell Heights SMC	1	27,019	People's Action Party	Goh Choon Kang	14,862	58.80
Braddell Heights SMC	1	27,019	Singapore Democratic Party	Sin Kek Tong	10,412	41.20
Brickworks GRC	3	43,117	People's Action Party	Ahmad Mattar; Chay Wai Chuen; Tan Soo Khoon	26,870	67.43
Brickworks GRC	3	43,117	Workers' Party	J. C. Corera; Goh Teng Hoon; Ismail Yaacob	12,977	32.57
Bukit Batok SMC	1	24,138	People's Action Party	Ong Chit Chung	12,873	55.94
Bukit Batok SMC	1	24,138	Singapore Democratic Party	Kwan Yue Keng	10,139	44.06
Bukit Gombak SMC	1	25,221	People's Action Party	Seet Ai Mee	12,661	53.46
Bukit Gombak SMC	1	25,221	Singapore Democratic Party	Ling How Doong	11,024	46.54
Bukit Merah SMC	1	14,723	People's Action Party	Lim Chee Onn	9,414	69.78
Bukit Merah SMC	1	14,723	Workers' Party	Pok Lee Chuen	4,077	30.22
Bukit Panjang SMC	1	33,824	People's Action Party	Lee Yiok Seng	18,314	57.28
Bukit Panjang SMC	1	33,824	Singapore Democratic Party	Kwek Guan Kwee	9,864	30.86
Bukit Panjang SMC	1	33,824	Pertubuhan Kebangsaan Melayu Singapura	Ibrahim Ariff	3,790	11.86
Bukit Timah SMC	1	20,222	People's Action Party	Wang Kai Yuen	Uncontested	
Buona Vista SMC	1	15,850	People's Action Party	Peter Sung	8,859	61.76
Buona Vista SMC	1	15,850	Singapore Democratic Party	Low Yong Nguan	5,037	35.11
Buona Vista SMC	1	15,850	Pertubuhan Kebangsaan Melayu Singapura	Abdul Karim Abdul Sattar	449	3.13
Cairnhill SMC	1	23,197	People's Action Party	Wong Kwei Cheong	12,779	63.98
Cairnhill SMC	1	23,197	Singapore Democratic Party	Jimmy Tan	7,194	36.02
Changi SMC	1	17,145	People's Action Party	Teo Chong Tee	9,398	59.73
Changi SMC	1	17,145	Workers' Party	Chiam Yeow Juan	6,431	40.63
Cheng San GRC	3	56,352	People's Action Party	Lee Yock Suan; S. Chandra Das; Heng Chiang Meng	Uncontested	
Chua Chu Kang SMC	1	19,628	People's Action Party	Low Seow Chay	11,058	59.28
Chua Chu Kang SMC	1	19,628	Workers' Party	Goh Seng Soon	7,597	40.72
Eunos GRC	3	75,723	People's Action Party	Tay Eng Soon; Chew Heng Ching; Zulkifli Mohammed	36,500	50.89
Eunos GRC	3	75,723	Workers' Party	Lee Siew Choh (Note: Elected as NCMP.); Mohd Khalit B Md Baboo; Francis Seow (Note: Elected as NCMP but lost his seat with effect from 17 December 1988 due to being convicted and fined for tax evasion.)	35,221	49.11
Fengshan SMC	1	17,389	People's Action Party	Arthur Beng Kian Lam	9,507	57.92
Fengshan SMC	1	17,389	Workers' Party	Chng Chin Siah	6,907	42.08
Hong Kah GRC	3	67,431	People's Action Party	Abdul Nasser Kamaruddin; John Chen; Yeo Cheow Tong	Uncontested	
Hougang SMC	1	21,703	People's Action Party	Tang Guan Seng	11,983	58.96
Hougang SMC	1	21,703	Workers' Party	Lim Chiu Liang	8,342	41.04
Jalan Besar GRC	3	54,941	People's Action Party	Lee Boon Yang; Peh Chin Hua; Sidek Saniff	31,604	62.68
Jalan Besar GRC	3	54,941	Workers' Party	Edmund Richard Marsh; Mohamed Idris; Toh Keng Thong	18,814	37.32
Jurong SMC	1	21,420	People's Action Party	Ho Kah Leong	14,769	75.17
Jurong SMC	1	21,420	Pertubuhan Kebangsaan Melayu Singapura	Mohamed Awang	4,879	24.83
Kallang SMC	1	21,245	People's Action Party	S. Dhanabalan	13,097	66.13
Kallang SMC	1	21,245	Workers' Party	A. L. Sundram	6,707	33.87
Kampong Glam SMC	1	21,773	People's Action Party	Loh Meng See	12,525	67.32
Kampong Glam SMC	1	21,773	Workers' Party	Frederick De Wind	5,800	31.87
Kampong Glam SMC	1	21,773	Angkatan Islam Singapura	M. Sani Jan	280	1.51
Kebun Baru SMC	1	22,515	People's Action Party	Lim Boon Heng	15,734	75.36
Kebun Baru SMC	1	22,515	National Solidarity Party	Mohamed Affendy Abdul Rahim	5,145	24.64
Kim Keat SMC	1	15,850	People's Action Party	Ong Teng Cheong	10,644	73.00
Kim Keat SMC	1	15,850	Singapore Democratic Party	Mohamed Shariff Yahya	3,937	27.00
Kim Seng SMC	1	18,474	People's Action Party	Yeo Ning Hong	11,460	66.90
Kim Seng SMC	1	18,474	Workers' Party	Chin Tian Choo	5,670	33.10
Kreta Ayer SMC	1	21,470	People's Action Party	Richard Hu	13,158	70.50
Kreta Ayer SMC	1	21,470	Workers' Party	Loh Fook Cheong	5,507	29.50
Leng Kee SMC	1	21,964	People's Action Party	Ow Chin Hock	13,334	64.96
Leng Kee SMC	1	21,964	Workers' Party	Peter Chua	7,192	35.04
MacPherson SMC	1	17,063	People's Action Party	Chua Sian Chin	10,453	65.98
MacPherson SMC	1	17,063	National Solidarity Party	Kum Teng Hock	5,390	34.02
Marine Parade GRC	3	62,385	People's Action Party	Goh Chok Tong; Choo Wee Khiang; Othman Haron Eusofe	41,325	73.81
Marine Parade GRC	3	62,385	Singapore Justice Party	A. R. Suib; M. Ramasamy; Theng Chin Eng	14,660	26.19
Moulmein SMC	1	19,229	People's Action Party	Lawrence Sia	11,334	66.08
Moulmein SMC	1	19,229	Workers' Party	A. Balakrishnan	5,817	33.92
Mountbatten SMC	1	17,747	People's Action Party	Eugene Yap	12,712	78.15
Mountbatten SMC	1	17,747	Independent	Chiam Pan Boon	3,554	21.85
Nee Soon Central SMC	1	24,403	People's Action Party	Ng Pock Too	13,396	57.61
Nee Soon Central SMC	1	24,403	Singapore Democratic Party	Cheo Chai Chen	8,944	38.46
Nee Soon Central SMC	1	24,403	United People's Front	Giam Lai Cheng	914	3.93
Nee Soon South SMC	1	22,542	People's Action Party	Koh Lip Lin	13,793	64.88
Nee Soon South SMC	1	22,542	Singapore Democratic Party	Yong Chu Leong	6,533	28.98
Nee Soon South SMC	1	22,542	United People's Front	Munjeet Singh	932	4.39
Pasir Panjang GRC	3	66,600	People's Action Party	Abbas Abu Amin; Bernard Chen; Wan Soon Bee	38,545	61.57
Pasir Panjang GRC	3	66,600	Workers' Party	Gan Eng Guan; Mohd Taib Sattar; Wee Han Kim	24,059	38.43
Paya Lebar SMC	1	25,076	People's Action Party	Philip Tan	12,352	52.36
Paya Lebar SMC	1	25,076	Singapore Democratic Party	David Chew	11,240	47.64
Potong Pasir SMC	1	19,852	Singapore Democratic Party	Chiam See Tong	11,804	63.13
Potong Pasir SMC	1	19,852	People's Action Party	Kenneth Chen	6,893	36.87
Punggol SMC	1	31,577	People's Action Party	Ng Kah Ting	17,914	59.85
Punggol SMC	1	31,577	Singapore Democratic Party	Abdul Rasheed Abdul Kuthus	12,017	40.15
Sembawang GRC	3	55,633	People's Action Party	Tony Tan; Charles Chong; K. Shanmugam	36,154	70.08
Sembawang GRC	3	55,633	United People's Front	Ang Bee Lian; Kasim Ibrahim; Harbans Singh	15,436	29.92
Serangoon Gardens SMC	1	24,831	People's Action Party	Lau Teik Soon	16,234	74.17
Serangoon Gardens SMC	1	24,831	Independent	Harry Baptist	5,654	25.83
Siglap SMC	1	18,650	People's Action Party	Abdullah Tarmugi	12,101	73.73
Siglap SMC	1	18,650	Workers' Party	Chong Tung Shang	4,311	26.27
Tampines GRC	3	65,148	People's Action Party	Mah Bow Tan; Aline Wong; Yatiman Yusof	37,216	61.00
Tampines GRC	3	65,148	National Solidarity Party	Abdul Malik Ali; Chan Yeng Cheong; Lim Ah Yong	23,796	39.00
Tanglin SMC	1	17,497	People's Action Party	Lew Syn Pau	Uncontested	
Tanjong Pagar SMC	1	19,041	People's Action Party	Lee Kuan Yew	14,043	81.60
Tanjong Pagar SMC	1	19,041	Independent	M. G. Guru	3,167	18.40
Teck Ghee SMC	1	15,510	People's Action Party	Lee Hsien Loong	11,512	79.13
Teck Ghee SMC	1	15,510	Independent	Patrick Leong	3,037	20.87
Telok Blangah SMC	1	18,609	People's Action Party	Koh Lam Son	11,160	64.21
Telok Blangah SMC	1	18,609	Workers' Party	Tan Soo Phuan	6,220	35.79
Thomson SMC	1	34,886	People's Action Party	Leong Horn Kee	21,514	67.01
Thomson SMC	1	34,886	Singapore Democratic Party	Ng Teck Siong	10,590	32.99
Tiong Bahru GRC	3	58,898	People's Action Party	Chng Hee Kok; Ch'ng Jit Koon; S. Vasoo	31,732	57.84
Tiong Bahru GRC	3	58,898	Workers' Party	Low Thia Khiang; Lim Lye Soon; Gopalan Nair	23,132	42.16
Toa Payoh GRC	3	49,243	People's Action Party	Davinder Singh; Ho Tat Kin; Wong Kan Seng	Uncontested	
Ulu Pandan SMC	1	23,587	People's Action Party	Dixie Tan	14,436	69.07
Ulu Pandan SMC	1	23,587	Singapore Democratic Party	George Sita	6,466	30.93
Whampoa SMC	1	13,819	People's Action Party	Augustine Tan	7,522	59.47
Whampoa SMC	1	13,819	National Solidarity Party	Ken Sunn	5,126	40.53
Yio Chu Kang SMC	1	15,991	People's Action Party	Lau Ping Sum	10,996	73.67
Yio Chu Kang SMC	1	15,991	National Solidarity Party	Rasiah Thiagarajah	3,931	26.33
Yuhua SMC	1	19,190	People's Action Party	Yu-Foo Yee Shoon	11,497	62.96
Yuhua SMC	1	19,190	Singapore Democratic Party	Toh Kim Kiat	6,765	37.04
Source: ELD

== Aftermath ==
In a further development in the structure of Parliament, the government implemented the Nominated Member of Parliament (NMPs) scheme in November 1990, two years after the general election. The initiative was intended to provide a platform for non-partisan and expert voices in legislative discussions. Although the enabling law permitted up to six Nominated Members of Parliament (NMPs) to be appointed, only two were selected initially. These NMPs served for a one-year term before the end of that Parliament's session, laying the groundwork for broader inclusion of civil society and professional perspectives in subsequent terms.
