= 1984 Singaporean general election =

- 22 December 1984

All 79 directly elected seats in Parliament (and up to 3 NCMPs)
- Registered: 1,495,389 (Note: 550,765 of the 1,495,389 voters were registered in uncontested constituencies, leaving 944,624 voters able to vote.)
- Turnout: 95.65% (▲0.15pp)
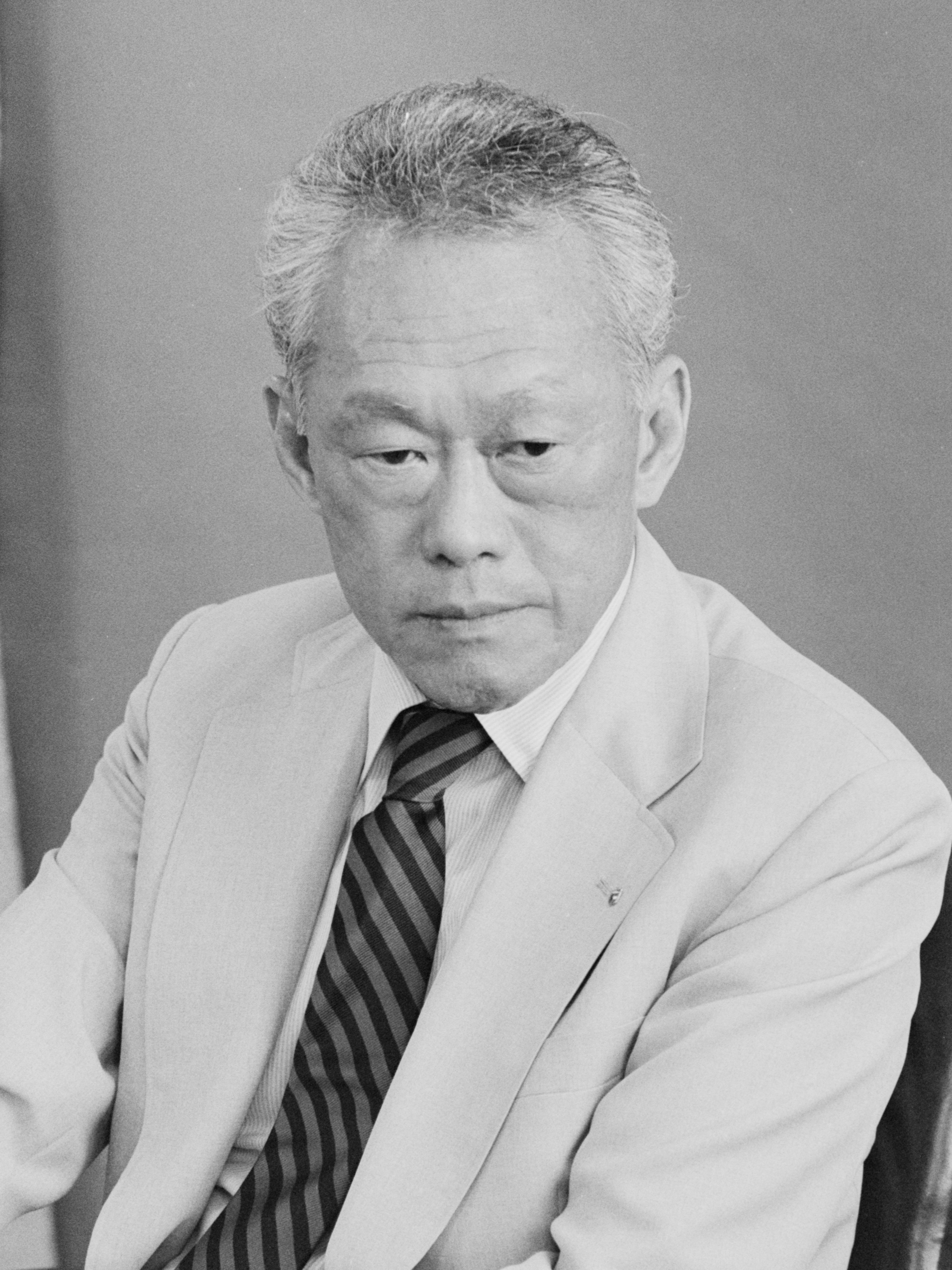

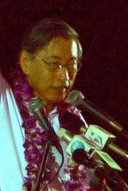
	First party	Second party	Third party
Leader	Lee Kuan Yew	J. B. Jeyaretnam	Chiam See Tong
Party	PAP	WP	SDP
Leader's seat	Tanjong Pagar	Anson	Ran in Potong Pasir (won)
Last election	77.66%, 75 seats	6.22%, 0 seats	1.77%, 0 seats
Seats won	77	1	1
Seat change	▲2	▲1	▲1
Popular vote	568,310	110,868	32,102
Percentage	64.83%	12.65%	3.66%
Swing	▼12.83pp	▲6.43pp	▲1.89pp
Prime Minister before election
Lee Kuan Yew
PAP
Prime Minister after election
Lee Kuan Yew
PAP

General elections were held in Singapore on 22 December 1984 to elect members of Parliament. They were the seventh general elections since the introduction of self-government in 1959 and the fifth since independence in 1965. The number of parliamentary seats increased from 75 to 79 following adjustments to electoral boundaries. Out of the 79 constituencies, 49 were contested while the remaining 30 were won uncontested by the People's Action Party (PAP).

Although the entry of an opposition MP in post-independence Singapore first occurred at the 1981 Anson by-election, the 1984 general elections represented a watershed in the nation's political landscape. It was the first occasion since 1963 in which the PAP failed to secure an unbroken sweep of all seats, signalling a departure from its hitherto uninterrupted dominance. Of the 49 seats contested, the Workers' Party (WP) and the Singapore Democratic Party (SDP) won one each, with the WP retaining Anson and the SDP establishing a foothold in Potong Pasir. This election was also the first to introduce the Non-constituency Member of Parliament (NCMP) scheme, which initially provided for three seats. As the opposition secured two elected seats, one NCMP seat was offered, although no opposition member accepted the appointment as the scheme was initially viewed as a token gesture that undermined genuine electoral competition.

The PAP secured 64.83% of the valid votes and 77 of 79 seats, a landslide victory that reaffirmed its supermajority and political dominance. However, it also reflected a sharp 12.83% swing against the party, the largest in any general election to date and marked its lowest vote share since independence. Voter turnout in contested constituencies stood at 95%, remaining largely consistent with the preceding general election. It also marked the returning presence of women candidates since 1970 following the elections of Yu-Foo Yee Shoon, Dixie Tan and Aline Wong from the PAP, who made their debuts this election.

== Background ==
=== Graduate Mothers' Scheme ===
In his 1983 National Day Rally speech, Prime Minister Lee Kuan Yew expressed concern that declining birth rates, combined with a large number of graduate women remaining single or marrying partners of lesser academic standing, could reduce Singapore's talent pool. In response, the PAP government introduced the Graduate Mothers' Scheme, offering incentives to encourage graduate women to marry and giving priority in top schools to the third child of graduate mothers.

The proposal sparked public outrage, particularly among female graduates, and Lee and proponents of the proposal faced accusations of elitism and even eugenics. The proposal proved sufficiently controversial that prominent PAP figures, including Deputy Prime Minister S. Rajaratnam and former cabinet minister Toh Chin Chye openly voiced their opposition to the scheme. Ultimately, the uproar over this proposal led to a swing of 12.9 percent against the PAP government in this election.

=== Central Provident Fund withdrawal age ===
In March 1984, the Health Minister Howe Yoon Chong proposed raising the age for withdrawing Central Provident Fund (CPF) savings from 55 to 60 years, a move that sparked controversy. At a news conference on 26 March 1984, Howe explained that Singaporeans could not "rely solely on their children for support" in old age. The suggestion, which appeared in the 54-page report of the "Committee on the Problems of the Aged" that he chaired, was eventually abandoned. However, elements of the report were incorporated into the CPF Minimum Sum scheme, which allows workers to withdraw part of their CPF savings at age 55 while reserving a specified minimum sum that can only be accessed at the retirement age.

=== Non-Constituency Member of Parliament scheme ===
The Non-Constituency Member of Parliament scheme (NCMP) was introduced in this election, allowing the best-performing unsuccessful opposition candidates who received at least 15% of the vote to be offered a seat if a single party won all the constituencies, with one NCMP seat subtracted for each opposition MP elected. Opposition parties criticised the scheme and initially boycotted it, arguing that it could mislead voters into believing they could have opposition representation without actually voting for them.

== Timeline ==
Date	Event
4 December	Dissolution of the 5th Parliament
12 December	Nomination Day
22 December	Polling day
25 February 1985	Opening of 6th Parliament

== Electoral boundaries ==
The creation of new constituencies reflected the rapid development of areas such as Ang Mo Kio, Tampines, Jurong East, Bedok and Jurong West as new towns, alongside other smaller developments. At the same time, several existing constituencies were dissolved, as shown in the table:

Constituency	Changes
New Constituencies
Bo Wen	Formed from Ang Mo Kio, Kebun Baru & Yio Chu Kang
Changkat	Formed from Tampines & Kaki Bukit
Eunos	Formed from Kaki Bukit & Tampines
Fengshan	Formed from Bedok, Kampong Chai Chee & Tanah Merah
Hong Kah	Formed from Boon Lay
Teck Ghee	Formed from Ang Mo Kio & Chong Boon
Yuhua	Formed from Boon Lay & Bukit Timah
Defunct Constituencies
Bukit Ho Swee	Absorbed to Tiong Bahru and Kim Seng
Havelock	Absorbed to Delta
Katong	Absorbed to Joo Chiat and Mountbatten

== MPs not standing for re-election ==
A total of 19 MPs retired at this election, among them notable stalwart, Goh Keng Swee. Additionally, Finance Minister Hon Sui Sen died in office on 14 October 1983, leaving the Havelock seat vacant until this election, as no by-election was held.

MP	Party	Constituency	Elected in
Abdul Rahim Ishak	PAP	Siglap	1963
Chan Chee Seng	PAP	Jalan Besar	1959
Chau Sik Ting	PAP	Thomson	1980
Chiang Hai Ding	PAP	Ulu Pandan	1970
Chor Yeok Eng	PAP	Bukit Timah	1966
Joseph Francis Conceicao	PAP	Katong	1968
Goh Keng Swee	PAP	Kreta Ayer	1959
Ho See Beng	PAP	Khe Bong	1963
Howe Yoon Chong	PAP	Potong Pasir	1979
Hwang Soo Jin	PAP	Jalan Kayu	1968
M. K. A. Jabbar	PAP	Radin Mas	1980
Lee Khoon Choy	PAP	Braddell Heights	1965
Liew Kok Pun	PAP	Boon Teck	1980
Rohan Kamis	PAP	Telok Blangah	1980
Saidi Shariff	PAP	Kaki Bukit	1980
Seah Mui Kok	PAP	Bukit Ho Swee	1968
P. Selvadurai	PAP	Kuo Chuan	1967
Sia Kah Hui	PAP	Paya Lebar	1963
Mansor Sukaimi	PAP	Kampong Kembangan	1976

== New candidates ==
Notable candidates in this election included Lee Hsien Loong, a brigadier-general of the Singapore Army and the son of prime minister Lee Kuan Yew, as well as Richard Hu, the first MP to be directly appointed as a cabinet minister, and other future ministers such as Abdullah Tarmugi, Lee Boon Yang, Mah Bow Tan, Wong Kan Seng and Yeo Cheow Tong. The opposition also fielded prominent figures such as Jufrie Mahmood of the WP and Ling How Doong of the SDP.

New candidate	Party	Constituency
Abdullah Tarmugi	PAP	Siglap
Arthur Beng	PAP	Fengshan
Chew Heng Ching	PAP	Kaki Bukit
Chng Chin Siah	SUF	Fengshan
Chng Hee Kok	PAP	Radin Mas
Chon Koon Cheong	WP	Henderson
Chong Tung Shang	SUF	Eunos
Peter Chua	WP	Delta
Gertrude De Gracias	SUF	Marine Parade
John Gan	WP	Pasir Panjang
Heng Chiang Meng	PAP	Jalan Kayu
Ho Tat Kin	PAP	Boon Teck
Richard Hu	PAP	Kreta Ayer
Ibrahim Othman	PAP	Tanah Merah
Lee Boon Yang	PAP	Jalan Besar
Lee Chin Teck	SUF	Bedok
Lee Hsien Loong	PAP	Teck Ghee
Leong Horn Kee	PAP	Thomson
Lim Ah Yong	SDP	Yuhua
Ling How Doong	SDP	Chong Boon
Stanley Mariadass	Independent	Sembawang
Mah Bow Tan	PAP	Potong Pasir
Mohamad Sani Jan	AIS	Pasir Panjang
Mohamed Jufrie Mahmood	WP	Kampong Kembangan
Mohd Taib Saffar	WP	Brickworks
Ng Pock Too	PAP	Anson
Quek Teow Chuan	SUF	Nee Soon
Sim Ah Leng	SUF	Punggol
Reveendran Sasi	SUF	Boon Lay
A. L. Sundram	WP	Kallang
Tan Ah Teng	Independent	Mountbatten
Dixie Tan	PAP	Ulu Pandan
Tan Jue Kit	UPF	Bukit Batok
Philip Tan	PAP	Paya Lebar
Tang Guan Seng	PAP	Khe Bong
Wang Kai Yuen	PAP	Bukit Timah
Aline Wong	PAP	Changkat
Wong Kan Seng	PAP	Kuo Chuan
Yatiman Yusof	PAP	Kampong Kembangan
Yeo Cheow Tong	PAP	Hong Kah
Yu-Foo Yee Shoon	PAP	Yuhua
Zulkifli Mohammed	PAP	Eunos

== Results ==
The highest-performing constituency in this election was Richard Hu's Kreta Ayer, the former seat of Goh Keng Swee who retired at this election, where Hu secured 83.17% of the vote against an independent candidate. This marked the first post-independence election in which the highest vote share was achieved outside of Tanjong Pagar, which had recorded the top result in four consecutive elections but was uncontested in this election.

Two candidates lost their deposits: Mohamad Sani bin Jan of Angkatan Islam Singapura (ANGKASA) in Pasir Panjang and Teo Kim Hoe of the United People's Front (UPF) in Chua Chu Kang. Teo received only 0.81% of the valid votes, the lowest score in any election at the time, a record that stood until Desmond Lim's 0.57% at the 2013 Punggol East by-election. Excluding the 30 uncontested constituencies, voter turnout was 95.65%, representing 63.2% of the total electorate.

This election also marked the return of female representation in Singaporean politics for the first time since the 1970 by-elections. Three women from the PAP, namely Yu-Foo Yee Shoon, Dixie Tan and Aline Wong, entered Parliament for the first time, making their debut in this contest.

The first NCMP offer went to M.P.D. Nair of the WP, who contested at Jalan Kayu and secured 48.78% of the vote, but following an internal party vote to turn down the position, he declined. The offer was then extended to Tan Chee Kien of the Singapore United Front (SUF), who contested at Kaki Bukit and secured 47.72% of the vote, and he also declined, after which no further offers were made.

Popular vote
1. PAP (64.8%)
2. WP (12.7%)
3. UF (9.95%)
4. SDP (3.66%)
5. UPF (3.10%)
6. Others (5.79%)
Elected seats won
1. 30 seats (PAP; uncontested) (38.0%)
2. 47 seats (PAP; contested) (59.5%)
3. 1 seat (SDP) (1.27%)
4. 1 seat (WP) (1.27%)

Party	Votes	%	+/–	Seats	+/–
People's Action Party	568,310	64.83	–12.83	77	+2
Workers' Party	110,868	12.65	+6.43	1	+1
Singapore United Front	87,237	9.95	+5.63	0	0
Singapore Democratic Party	32,102	3.66	+1.89	1	+1
United People's Front	27,217	3.10	–1.39	0	0
Barisan Sosialis	24,212	2.76	+0.17	0	0
Singapore Justice Party	10,906	1.24	+0.41	0	0
Pertubuhan Kebangsaan Melayu Singapura	4,768	0.54	–1.57	0	0
Angkatan Islam Singapura	359	0.04	New	0	New
Independents	10,586	1.21	New	0	New
Total	876,565	100.00	–	79	+4
Valid votes	876,565	97.08			
Invalid/blank votes	26,394	2.92			
Total votes	902,959	100.00			
Registered voters/turnout	1,495,389	95.59			
Source: Singapore Elections

Opposition parties contested vote
Party	Votes
SDP	46.06%
WP	42.00%
BS	38.20%
PKMS	36.27%
SUF	34.21%
SJP	24.40%
UPF	19.95%
Independents	19.72%
ANGKASA	2.29%

=== By constituency ===
Constituency	Electorate	Party	Candidate	Votes	%
Alexandra	19,670	People's Action Party	Tan Soo Khoon	12,172	66.79
Alexandra	19,670	Workers' Party	J. C. Corera	6,053	33.21
Aljunied	19,045	People's Action Party	Chin Harn Tong	Uncontested	
Ang Mo Kio	14,633	People's Action Party	Yeo Toon Chia	9,909	72.75
Ang Mo Kio	14,633	United People's Front	Ang Bee Lian	3,711	27.25
Anson	18,493	Workers' Party	J. B. Jeyaratnam	9,909	56.81
Anson	18,493	People's Action Party	Ng Pock Too	7,533	43.19
Ayer Rajah	20,017	People's Action Party	Tan Cheng Bock	14,050	75.44
Ayer Rajah	20,017	Singapore Justice Party	A. R. Suib	4,575	24.56
Bedok	17,074	People's Action Party	S. Jayakumar	10,972	68.95
Bedok	17,074	Singapore United Front	Lee Chin Teck	4,941	31.05
Bo Wen	14,777	People's Action Party	Sushilan Vasoo	10,299	74.70
Bo Wen	14,777	United People's Front	Ahmad Salim	3,488	25.30
Boon Lay	18,964	People's Action Party	Goh Chee Wee	12,490	69.65
Boon Lay	18,964	Singapore United Front	Reveendran Sasi	5,443	30.35
Boon Teck	19,490	People's Action Party	Ho Tat Kin	10,224	56.16
Boon Teck	19,490	Barisan Sosialis	Lee Siew Choh	7,982	43.84
Braddell Heights	14,152	People's Action Party	Goh Choon Kang	Uncontested	
Brickworks	13,571	People's Action Party	Ahmad Mattar	8,389	66.27
Brickworks	13,571	Workers' Party	Mohd Taib Saffar	4,270	33.73
Bukit Batok	20,812	People's Action Party	Chai Chong Yii	14,767	78.27
Bukit Batok	20,812	United People's Front	Tan Jue Kit	4,099	21.73
Bukit Merah	19,210	People's Action Party	Lim Chee Onn	Uncontested	
Bukit Panjang	23,173	People's Action Party	Lee Yiok Seng	Uncontested	
Bukit Timah	17,238	People's Action Party	Wang Kai Yuen	Uncontested	
Buona Vista	18,041	People's Action Party	Ang Kok Peng	Uncontested	
Cairnhill	15,862	People's Action Party	Wong Kwei Cheong	Uncontested	
Changi	20,129	People's Action Party	Teo Chong Tee	12,195	65.75
Changi	20,129	Singapore United Front	Sim Peng Kim	6,353	34.25
Changkat	18,742	People's Action Party	Aline Wong	10,310	58.56
Changkat	18,742	Singapore Democratic Party	Soon Kia Seng	7,297	41.44
Cheng San	17,328	People's Action Party	Lee Yock Suan	Uncontested	
Chong Boon	20,650	People's Action Party	S. Chandra Das	11,058	56.02
Chong Boon	20,650	Singapore Democratic Party	Ling How Doong	8,681	43.98
Chua Chu Kang	25,532	People's Action Party	Tang See Chim	13,254	54.84
Chua Chu Kang	25,532	Workers' Party	Chan Keng Sieng	10,720	44.35
Chua Chu Kang	25,532	United People's Front	Teo Kim Hoe	196	0.81
Clementi	20,890	People's Action Party	Bernard Chen	Uncontested	
Delta	14,800	People's Action Party	Yeo Choo Kok	7,987	58.72
Delta	14,800	Workers' Party	Peter Chua	5,614	41.28
Eunos	17,615	People's Action Party	Zulkifli Mohammed	10,494	64.81
Eunos	17,615	Singapore United Front	Chong Tung Shang	5,697	35.19
Fengshan	18,407	People's Action Party	Arthur Beng	11,216	65.13
Fengshan	18,407	Singapore United Front	Chng Chin Siah	6,005	34.87
Geylang Serai	24,109	People's Action Party	Othman Haron Eusofe	14,564	65.57
Geylang Serai	24,109	Singapore United Front	Mohamed Mansor Rahman	7,649	34.43
Geylang West	22,325	People's Action Party	Teh Cheang Wan	13,798	66.83
Geylang West	22,325	Singapore United Front	Lim Tiong Hock	2,994	34.43
Henderson	17,630	People's Action Party	Lai Tha Chai	9,695	58.80
Henderson	17,630	Workers' Party	Chon Koon Cheong	6,793	41.20
Hong Kah	22,062	People's Action Party	Yeo Cheow Tong	Uncontested	
Jalan Besar	16,115	People's Action Party	Lee Boon Yang	9,236	64.43
Jalan Besar	16,115	Workers' Party	A. Balakrishnan	5,100	35.57
Jalan Kayu	25,011	People's Action Party	Heng Chiang Meng	11,985	51.22
Jalan Kayu	25,011	Workers' Party	M. P. D. Nair (Note: Elected NCMP on 24 December 1984 but rejected to take the seat on 4 January 1985. Seat declared vacant on 4 March 1985.)	11,414	48.78
Joo Chiat	18,957	People's Action Party	Yeoh Ghim Seng	Uncontested	
Jurong	24,517	People's Action Party	Ho Kah Leong	Uncontested	
Kaki Bukit	20,683	People's Action Party	Chew Heng Ching	10,229	52.28
Kaki Bukit	20,683	Singapore United Front	Tan Chee Kien (Note: Offered NCMP seat on 8 March 1985 but rejected on 28 March 1985. Declared resigned.)	9,336	47.72
Kallang	18,809	People's Action Party	S. Dhanabalan	11,256	64.95
Kallang	18,809	Workers' Party	A. L. Sundram	6,075	35.05
Kampong Chai Chee	22,537	People's Action Party	Fong Sip Chee	12,125	57.16
Kampong Chai Chee	22,537	Singapore United Front	Seow Khee Leng	9,087	42.84
Kampong Glam	18,127	People's Action Party	S. Rajaratnam	Uncontested	
Kampong Kembangan	20,295	People's Action Party	Yatiman Yusof	10,326	55.71
Kampong Kembangan	20,295	Workers' Party	Jufrie Mahmood	3,023	44.29
Kampong Ubi	14,323	People's Action Party	Wan Hussin Zoohri	8,378	63.73
Kampong Ubi	14,323	Pertubuhan Kebangsaan Melayu Singapura	Abdul Rahman Zin	4,768	36.27
Kebun Baru	17,542	People's Action Party	Lim Boon Heng	12,311	75.84
Kebun Baru	17,542	United People's Front	Harbans Singh	3,921	24.16
Khe Bong	15,773	People's Action Party	Tang Guan Seng	9,221	62.53
Khe Bong	15,773	Barisan Sosialis	Sim Say Chuan	5,525	37.47
Kim Keat	20,439	People's Action Party	Ong Teng Cheong	Uncontested	
Kim Seng	22,136	People's Action Party	Yeo Ning Hong	Uncontested	
Kolam Ayer	23,630	People's Action Party	Sidek Saniff	12,812	57.91
Kolam Ayer	23,630	Workers' Party	G. S. Roy	9,311	42.09
Kreta Ayer	15,982	People's Action Party	Richard Hu	11,083	83.17
Kreta Ayer	15,982	Independent	Lee Mun Hung	2,242	16.83
Kuo Chuan	18,728	People's Action Party	Wong Kan Seng	11,162	64.55
Kuo Chuan	18,728	Barisan Sosialis	Sim Chit Giak	6,129	35.45
Leng Kee	14,805	People's Action Party	Ow Chin Hock	9,190	66.84
Leng Kee	14,805	Workers' Party	G. B. Armstrong	4,559	33.16
MacPherson	19,500	People's Action Party	Chua Sian Chin	Uncontested	
Marine Parade	23,622	People's Action Party	Goh Chok Tong	15,228	70.93
Marine Parade	23,622	Singapore United Front	Gertrude De Gracias	6,242	29.07
Moulmein	18,893	People's Action Party	Lawrence Sia	Uncontested	
Mountbatten	21,480	People's Action Party	Eugene Yap	16,077	81.32
Mountbatten	21,480	Independent	Tan Ah Teng	3,692	18.68
Nee Soon	26,897	People's Action Party	Koh Lip Lin	18,444	74.24
Nee Soon	26,897	Singapore United Front	Quek Teow Chuan	6,401	25.76
Pasir Panjang	17,149	People's Action Party	Abbas Abu Amin	9,316	59.35
Pasir Panjang	17,149	Workers' Party	John Gan	6,022	38.36
Pasir Panjang	17,149	Angkatan Islam Singapura	M. Sani Jan	359	2.29
Paya Lebar	18,420	People's Action Party	Philip Tan	Uncontested	
Potong Pasir	17,915	Singapore Democratic Party	Chiam See Tong	10,128	60.28
Potong Pasir	17,915	People's Action Party	Mah Bow Tan	5,509	39.72
Punggol	24,727	People's Action Party	Ng Kah Ting	14,904	65.09
Punggol	24,727	Singapore United Front	Sim Ah Leng	7,995	34.91
Queenstown	18,084	People's Action Party	Jek Yeun Thong	Uncontested	
Radin Mas	19,770	People's Action Party	Chng Hee Kok	9,997	53.78
Radin Mas	19,770	Workers' Party	Wong Hong Toy	8,590	46.22
River Valley	13,481	People's Action Party	Tay Eng Soon	Uncontested	
Rochore	14,164	People's Action Party	Toh Chin Chye	Uncontested	
Sembawang	22,326	People's Action Party	Tony Tan	15,948	77.42
Sembawang	22,326	Independent	Stanley Mariadass	4,652	22.58
Serangoon Gardens	17,553	People's Action Party	Lau Teik Soon	Uncontested	
Siglap	17,090	People's Action Party	Abdullah Tarmugi	Uncontested	
Tampines	19,656	People's Action Party	Phua Bah Lee	13,163	72.34
Tampines	19,656	United People's Front	Kasim Ibrahim	5,032	27.66
Tanah Merah	17,808	People's Action Party	Ibrahim Othman	11,093	68.08
Tanah Merah	17,808	Singapore United Front	Ng Lep Chong	5,201	31.92
Tanglin	15,990	People's Action Party	E. W. Barker	Uncontested	
Tanjong Pagar	15,812	People's Action Party	Lee Kuan Yew	Uncontested	
Teck Ghee	16,866	People's Action Party	Lee Hsien Loong	12,794	80.38
Teck Ghee	16,866	United People's Front	Giam Lai Cheng	3,123	19.62
Telok Ayer	13,984	People's Action Party	Ong Pang Boon	Uncontested	
Telok Blangah	19,550	People's Action Party	Koh Lam Son	10,150	55.02
Telok Blangah	19,550	Workers' Party	Rajaratnam Murugason	8,299	44.98
Thomson	15,271	People's Action Party	Leong Horn Kee	Uncontested	
Tiong Bahru	20,091	People's Action Party	Ch'ng Jit Koon	Uncontested	
Toa Payoh	14,177	People's Action Party	Eric Cheong	8,559	65.16
Toa Payoh	14,177	Barisan Sosialis	Ng Ho	4,576	34.84
Ulu Pandan	22,761	People's Action Party	Dixie Tan	Uncontested	
West Coast	28,008	People's Action Party	Wan Soon Bee	19,745	75.72
West Coast	28,008	Singapore Justice Party	M. Ramasamy	6,331	24.28
Whampoa	18,494	People's Action Party	Augustine Tan	Uncontested	
Yio Chu Kang	16,734	People's Action Party	Lau Ping Sum	11,977	76.66
Yio Chu Kang	16,734	United People's Front	Munjeet Singh	3,647	23.34
Yuhua	16,266	People's Action Party	Yu-Foo Yee Shoon	9,551	61.43
Yuhua	16,266	Singapore Democratic Party	Lim Ah Yong	5,996	38.57
Source: ELD

== Aftermath ==
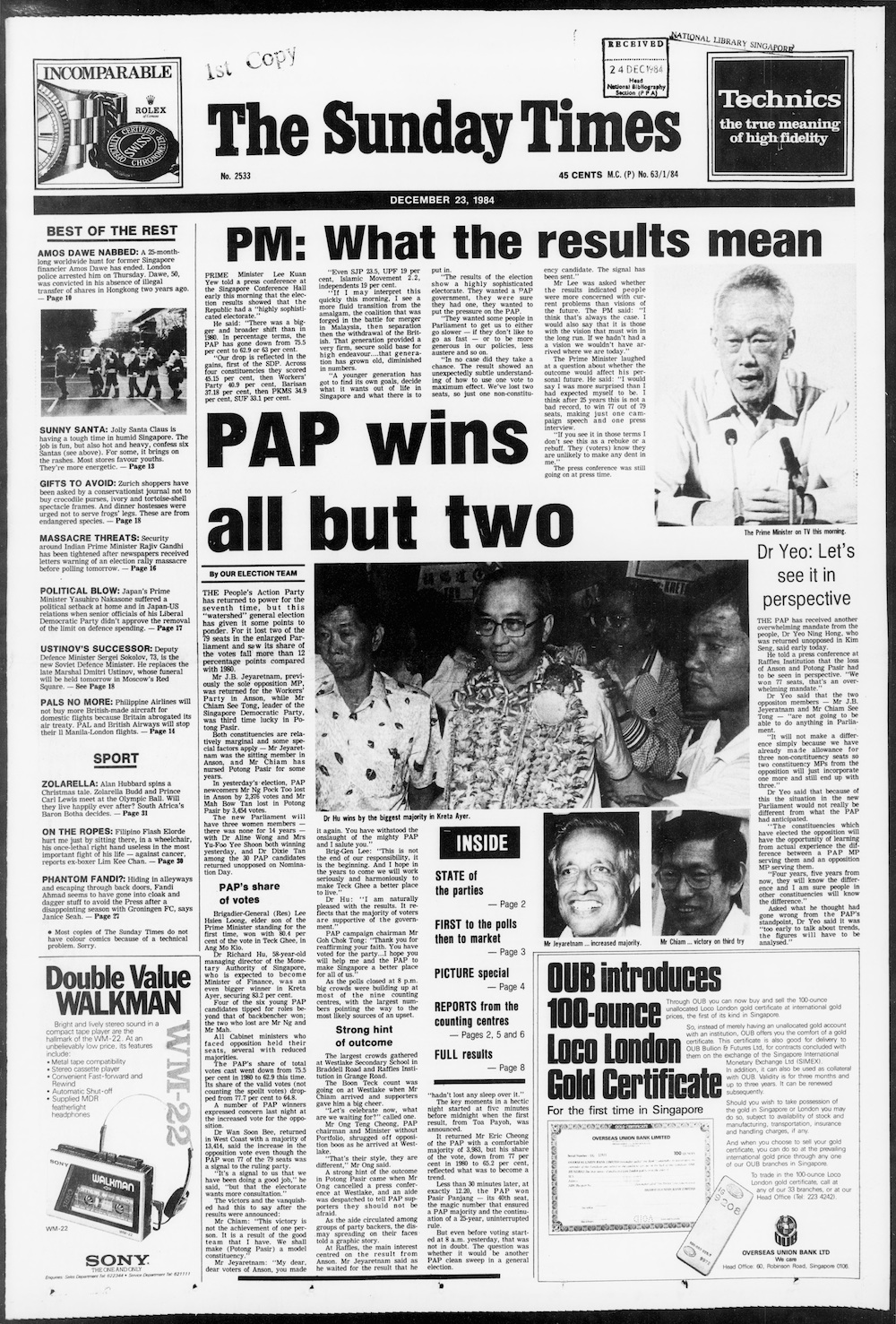
The front page of The Sunday Times on 23 December 1984

The widespread debate and public uproar over the GMS and CPF proposals led many Singaporeans to view the quarter-century PAP government as increasingly arrogant, elitist and out of touch, contributing to a sharp decline in support. The 1984 election was also among the first in which a generation of voters had grown up knowing only PAP rule. Its share of the vote fell to 64.83%, representing a negative swing of 12.83%, the largest anti-PAP swing in a seriously contested general election as of 2025 and the lowest since independence at that time. In his memoirs, Lee acknowledged that the swing exceeded his expectations.

WP secretary-general J. B. Jeyaretnam, who had become the first opposition MP in the Anson constituency following the 1981 by-election, successfully retained his seat with an increased majority. The party also got 42.00% of their total contested vote, their best performance for three decades until the 2011 election. The SDP also entered Parliament for the first time with the victory of its leader Chiam See Tong in Potong Pasir, where he would serve for decades even after he left the SDP. The SDP achieved 46.06% of the contested vote, the highest attained by any opposition party in post-independence Singapore at the time, a record that would later be surpassed in the 1991 election with 48.56%.

Although the NCMP scheme was initially boycotted, its introduction marked the beginning of a trend in which multiple political parties were nominally represented in Parliament, as opposition parties began accepting NCMP seats in later elections. Exceptions occurred between 1986 and 1988 following the disqualification of the sole WP MP J. B. Jeyaretnam, as well as in the 2015–2020 and 2025–2030 sessions, when the WP remained the only opposition party holding both MPs and NCMPs.

This election also marked the first occasion in which the candidate deposit remained at $1,500 from the previous election, a consistency that would not occur again until the 2025 election, when the deposit of S$13,500 matched that of the 2020 election.
