= Changkat Constituency =

Former electoral division in Singapore

Changkat Constituency was a constituency in Tampines, Singapore. It lasted for a single term from 1984 to 1988, being initially carved out from Tampines and Kaki Bukit Constituencies before being merged into Tampines Group Representation Constituency (GRC). Its last Member of Parliament was Aline Wong of the People's Action Party.

== History ==
Changkat Constituency was established for the 1984 Singaporean general election by carving out parts of Tampines and Kaki Bukit Constituencies.

During the 1988 Singaporean general election, following the establishment of GRC and Single Member Constituency (SMC), the constituency was merged into Tampines GRC.

== Member of Parliament ==
| Year | Member of Parliament | Party |
|---|---|---|
| 1984 | Aline Wong | PAP |

== Electoral results ==
Note: The Elections Department does not include rejected votes when calculating the vote shares of candidates. Hence, all candidates' vote shares will total to 100% at any given election (may not appear so in multi-way contests due to rounding).

=== Elections in 1980s ===
General Election 1984
| Party | Candidate | Votes | % | ±% |
|---|---|---|---|---|
| PAP | Aline Wong | 10,310 | 58.56 | N/A |
| SDP | Soon Kia Seng | 7,297 | 41.44 | N/A |
| Majority | | 3,013 | 17.2 | |
| Turnout | | 18,025 | 96.2 | N/A |
| PAP win (new seat) | | | | |
