= Hong Kah Constituency =

Historical constituency in Singapore

Coordinates: 1.356°N 103.71°E

Hong Kah
- Former Single Member constituency for the Parliament of Singapore
- Region: Singapore

Former constituency
- Created: 1984
- Abolished: 1988
- Seats: 1
- Member: Constituency Abolished
- Town Council: Chua Chu Kang
- Created from: Boon Lay
- Replaced by: Hong Kah GRC

Hong Kah Constituency (Traditional Chinese: 丰加單選區; Simplified Chinese: 丰加单选区) was a single member constituency within Jurong, Singapore. It was formed by carving out areas from Boon Lay Constituency. It existed for a single electoral term from 1984 to 1988. Yeo Cheow Tong was the only Member of Parliament for the SMC from 1984 to 1988. In 1988, it was absorbed into Hong Kah Group Representation Constituency.

== Member of Parliament ==
Election	Member of Parliament	Party
1984	Yeo Cheow Tong	PAP

== Electoral results ==
Note: The Elections Department does not include rejected votes when calculating the vote shares of candidates. Hence, all candidates' vote shares will total to 100% at any given election (may not appear so in multi-way contests due to rounding).

=== Elections in 1980s ===
General Election 1984
Party	Candidate	Votes	%
PAP	Yeo Cheow Tong	Unopposed	
Registered electors		22,062	
PAP win (new seat)			
