= Andy Gan =

Singaporean politician

- 颜来章

Member of the Singapore Parliament for Marine Parade GRC
- In office 25 October 2001 – 20 April 2006
- Preceded by: PAP held
- Succeeded by: PAP held
- Majority: N/A (walkover)

Personal details
- Born: Gan Lai Chiang; 1948 (age 77–78) Colony of Singapore
- Party: People's Action Party

Andy Gan Lai Chiang (Note: Chinese: 颜来章; Pe̍h-ōe-jī: Gân Lâi-chiang; pinyin: Yán Láizhāng) (born 1948) is a Singaporean former politician. As a member of the governing People's Action Party (PAP), he represented the Marine Parade Group Representation Constituency (GRC) between 2001 and 2006.

== Career ==
Gan first stood in the 1991 and 1997 general elections in Potong Pasir Single Member Constituency (SMC), losing to incumbent Chiam See Tong. In the 2001 general election, he ran in Marine Parade GRC; the PAP team won uncontested. He retired from politics in the 2006 general election.

== Early life ==
A great-great-grandson of Gan Eng Seng, Gan was educated at Kwong Avenue School, Victoria School, Singapore Polytechnic and the University of Western Australia.
