= Ng Pock Too =

Singaporean politician

Ng Pock Too (Note: Chinese: 吴博韬; Jyutping: Ng^{4} Bok^{3} Tou^{1}; pinyin: Wú Bótāo) is a former Singaporean politician. A member of the country's governing People's Action Party (PAP), he served as the Member of Parliament (MP) for the constituency of Nee Soon Central from 1988 to 1991.

== Career ==
Ng began his career at Singapore's Economic Development Board (EDB) in 1968. He served as deputy director of the board from 1980 to 1982.

Ng joined Singapore's Trade Development Board in 1982, and became its chief executive officer in January 1984.

In May 1984, Ng was appointed the political secretary to Singapore's prime minister, Lee Kuan Yew, serving until Lee stood down as prime minister in November 1990.

Ng also served as executive secretary of the Singapore Port Workers' Union from 1986 to 1990, deputy secretary-general of the National Trades Union Congress (NTUC) from 1987 to 1990, president of the Sembawang Group from 1990 to 1994, and chairman of the board of directors of NTUC Income from 1990 to 2005.

== Political career ==
Ng first stood for Parliament at the 1984 general election in the constituency of Anson, where he was defeated by the incumbent MP, the leader of the Workers' Party, J. B. Jeyaretnam, by 7,533 votes (43.2%) to 9,909 (56.8%).

At the 1988 general election, Ng was elected as the MP for Nee Soon Central. He won 13,396 votes (57.6%), defeating the candidate of the Singapore Democratic Party (SDP), Cheo Chai Chen, who earned 8,944 votes (38.5%), and Giam Lai Cheng of the United People's Front (UPF), who garnered 914 votes (3.9%).

During his term in Parliament, Ng served as the chairman of the Government Parliamentary Committee for Defence and Foreign Affairs.

At the 1991 general election, Ng was defeated in Nee Soon Central in a surprise result by the SDP's Cheo Chai Chen (who he had previously defeated at the 1988 general election). In a very close result, Cheo won with 12,709 votes (50.3%) to Ng's 12,541 (49.7%).

== Education ==
Ng attended the University of New Brunswick in Canada as a Colombo Plan Scholar, where he earned a degree in mechanical engineering in 1968. In 1976, he completed the Programme for Management Development at the Harvard Business School.
