= Khe Bong Constituency =

Constituency in Singapore

Coordinates: 1.337°N 103.849°E

Khe Bong
- Former Single Member constituency for the Parliament of Singapore
- Region: Singapore

Former constituency
- Created: 1976
- Abolished: 1988
- Seats: 1
- Member: Constituency Abolished

Khe Bong Constituency was a constituency in Singapore. It existed from 1976 to 1988 and was absorbed into Toa Payoh Group Representation Constituency. It absorbed part of Kuo Chuan & Toa Payoh constituencies.

== History ==
In 1988, the constituency was dissolved following the establishment of Group representation constituency (GRC) and Single Member Constituency (SMC).

== Member of Parliament ==
Year	Member	Party
Formation
1976	Ho See Beng	PAP
1980	Ho See Beng	PAP
1984	Tang Guan Seng	PAP
Constituency abolished (1988)

== Electoral results ==
Note: The Elections Department does not include rejected votes when calculating the vote shares of candidates. Hence, all candidates' vote shares will total to 100% at any given election (may not appear so in multi-way contests due to rounding).

=== Elections in 1970s ===
General Election 1976
Party	Candidate	Votes	%	±%
PAP	Ho See Beng	10,950	74.33	
BS	Sim Say Chuan	3,782	25.67	
PAP win (new seat)				

=== Elections in 1980s ===
General Election 1980
Party	Candidate	Votes	%	±%
PAP	Ho See Beng	10,497	72.42	▼1.91
BS	Sim Say Chuan	3,998	27.58	▲1.91
Majority		6,499	44.84	
Total valid votes		14,495		
Rejected ballots				
Turnout				
Registered electors		15,425		
PAP hold				

General Election 1984
Party	Candidate	Votes	%	±%
PAP	Tang Guan Seng	9,221	62.53	▼9.89
BS	Sim Say Chuan	5,525	37.47	▲9.89
Majority		3,696	25.06	▼19.78
Total valid votes		14,746		
Rejected ballots				
Turnout				
Registered electors		15,773		▲2.26
PAP hold				
