= Peter Sung =

Singaporean politician

- 宋彼得

Member of the Singapore Parliament for Buona Vista SMC
- In office 4 September 1988 – 16 December 1996
- Preceded by: Ang Kok Peng (PAP)
- Succeeded by: Constituency abolished

Personal details
- Born: Peter Sung; 1940 (age 85–86) Singapore, Straits Settlements
- Party: People's Action Party

Peter Sung (Note: Chinese: 宋彼得; pinyin: Sòng Bǐdé) (born 1940) is a former Singaporean politician and member of the People's Action Party (PAP). He was a Minister of State, 1988 to 1991, and the Member of Parliament (MP) for Buona Vista Single Member Constituency (SMC), 1988 to 1997.

== Education ==
Sung attended Victoria School and the University of Singapore.

== Career ==
Sung became Tuan Sing chairman in 1992 until 2005.

== Political career ==
Sung became a Member of Parliament (MP) for Buona Vista SMC in 1988 and served for two terms until 1996.

In the 1991 General Election, he scored PAP's highest percentage increase in votes, winning 79.4% of the valid votes, up from 61.8% in 1988.

He was the Minister of State for the Ministry of National Development, 1 November 1988 to 31 August 1991, and the Ministry of Home Affairs, 28 November 1990 to 31 August 1991.
