= Singapore Justice Party =

Singaporean political party

- Chinese name: 新加坡正义党; Xīnjiāpō Zhèngyì Dǎng
- Malay name: Parti Keadilan Singapura
- Tamil name: சிங்கப்பூர் நீதிக் கட்சி Ciṅkappūr Nītik Kaṭci
- Secretary-General: Desmond Lim
- Founded: 1972; 54 years ago
- National affiliation: Singapore Democratic Alliance
- Colours: Gold
- Parliament: 0 / 104

Website
- Official website

The Singapore Justice Party (abbreviation: SJP) is a political party in Singapore.

== History ==
The SJP was formed in August 1972 to represent the Indian community in Singapore.

In 1975, SJP joined the United People Front (UPF), a political alliance with the United National Front, Singapore Chinese Party, Singapore Malay National Organisation (PKMS) and members of the Barisan Sosialis (BS) and United Front (UF). On 14 August 1976, SJP left the UPF. In November 1976, SJP joined the Joint Opposition Council, a political alliance with PKMS, BS and UF.

SJP contested the 1980 general election and fielded two candidates in Ayer Rajah and West Coast Constituencies. From 1988 to 1992, the party was mostly active in Marine Parade Group Representation Constituency, where it contested in two general elections and one by-election. In the contested elections, it had lost to the People's Action Party. It did not participate in the 1997 general election.

In the run-up to the 2001 general election, responding to Chiam See Tong's call for a united front against the ruling People's Action Party, the party joined with the National Solidarity Party, the Singapore People's Party and the Singapore Malay National Organisation to form the Singapore Democratic Alliance (SDA). Although SJP failed to win any seats since it was formed, the SDA managed to win one seat at Potong Pasir, with Chiam See Tong of the Singapore People's Party as Member of Parliament. In addition, Steve Chia of the National Solidarity Party was appointed as Non-Constituency Member of Parliament (NCMP).

In 1996, the chairman Desmond Lim Bak Chuan had left SJP to join the Singapore People's Party (SPP). From March 2006, Aminuddin bin Ami was appointed as the secretary-general of SJP. In March 2011, after SPP left the SDA, Lim left SPP and rejoined SJP. He was subsequently appointed as the secretary-general of SJP.

== Leadership ==
=== List of secretaries-general ===
No	Name	Years	Ref
1	Muthusamy Ramasamy	1975 - Unknown	
2	Aminuddin bin Ami	2006 - Unknown	
3	Desmond Lim	2011 - Present	

== Electoral performance ==
=== Parliament ===
Election	Leader	Votes	%	Seats					Position	Result
Election	Leader	Votes	%	Contested			Total	+/–	Position	Result
Election	Leader	Votes	%	Seats	Won	Lost	Total	+/–	Position	Result
1976	Muthusamy Ramasamy	5,199	0.65%	2	0	2	0 / 69	Steady	▲7th	No seats
1980	Muthusamy Ramasamy	5,271	0.83%	2	0	2	0 / 75	Steady	▼8th	No seats
1984	Muthusamy Ramasamy	10,906	1.24%	2	0	2	0 / 79	Steady	▲7th	No seats
1988	Muthusamy Ramasamy	14,660	1.09%	3	0	3	0 / 81	Steady	▲6th	No seats
1991	Muthusamy Ramasamy	15,222	1.94%	4	0	4	0 / 81	Steady	▲5th	No seats

==== Seats contested ====
Election	Constituencies contested	Contested vote %	+/–
1976	SMC: Boon Lay, Bukit Batok	17.8%	—N/a
1980	SMC: Ayer Rajah, West Coast	16.0%	▼1.8%
1984	SMC: Ayer Rajah, West Coast	24.4%	▲8.4%
1988	3-member GRC: Marine Parade	26.2%	▲1.8%
1991	4-member GRC: Marine Parade	22.8%	▼3.4%

=== By-election ===
Election	Leader	Constituency contested	Votes	%	Seats				Result
Election	Leader	Constituency contested	Votes	%	Contested		Total	+/–	Result
Election	Leader	Constituency contested	Votes	%	Won	Lost	Total	+/–	Result
1992	Muthusamy Ramasamy	Marine Parade GRC^{1}	764	1.14%	0	4	0 / 4	Steady	Lost

1. : Loss of candidate election deposit(s) in contested seat(s)
