= Zulkifli Mohammed =

Singaporean politician

- ذوالکيفلي محمد

Member of Parliament for Jalan Besar GRC (Kolam Ayer Division)
- In office 6 January 1992 – 16 December 1996
- Preceded by: Sidek Saniff
- Succeeded by: Yaacob Ibrahim

Member of Parliament for Eunos GRC (Eunos Division)
- In office 9 January 1989 – 14 August 1991
- Preceded by: Constituency established
- Succeeded by: Sidek Saniff

Member of Parliament for Eunos Constituency
- In office 22 December 1984 – 17 August 1988
- Preceded by: Constituency established
- Succeeded by: Constituency abolished

Personal details
- Born: Zulkifli bin Mohammed; 8 August 1948 (age 77) Colony of Singapore
- Party: People's Action Party
- Profession: Politician

Zulkifli bin Mohammed (Note: Jawi: ذوالکيفلي بن محمد) (born 8 August 1948) is a former Singaporean politician. A member of the ruling People's Action Party, Zulkifli was involved in politics for 14 years before retiring from politics in 1996.

== Early life ==
Zulkifli studied political science at the University of Singapore and graduated with honours in 1970. Following his graduation, Zulkifli worked for Shell Eastern Petroleum. He would continue to work at the firm until his election to parliament. Although Malays were exempted from the National Service draft beginning in 1967, Zulkifli volunteered for the People's Defence Force Volunteer Unit and was an Infantry Officer between 1967 and 1977. In 1983, Zulkifli was elected as the president of Majlis Pusat, otherwise known as the Central Council of Malay Cultural Organisations.

== Career ==
=== Political career ===
In 1984, Zulkifli ran for election as a PAP candidate in Eunos SMC; he had previously turned down the nomination for the 1976 and 1980 General Elections. He won 64.81% of the votes against Singapore United Front candidate Chong Tung Shang. Following the formation of the GRC system in 1988, Eunos SMC became part of 3-person Eunos GRC. The PAP team contesting the election included Chew Heng Ching and Tay Eng Soon. The election in Eunos GRC was the closest in the 1988 General Election, with the PAP team narrowly beating the Workers' Party with 50.89% of the votes. The WP team comprised Lee Siew Choh, Mohd Khalit B Md Baboo, and Francis Seow. In the 1991 election, Zulkifli switched places with Sidek bin Saniff and joined the PAP team for Jalan Besar GRC. The team ran uncontested for parliament.

Zulkifli was the Political Secretary for Community Development from 1986 to 1991. In the first Goh Chok Tong cabinet, Zulkifli was the Political Secretary to Deputy Prime Minister Ong Teng Cheong between 1991 and 1993 until Ong's election to the presidency. Zulkifli's last position in the cabinet was as the Political Secretary to Minister without Portfolio, now known as Minister in the Prime Minister's Office.

While serving as a Member of Parliament, Zulkifli kept his position as the president of Majilis Pusat. He was also deputy director and subsequently Director of Community Development at the National Trades Union Congress (NTUC).

=== Post-political career ===
After Zulkifli stepped down as an MP, he became a vice-president of Singapore Anti-Narcotics Association and executive director of NTUC Eldercare Co-operative Limited. Zulkifli was the chief executive officer of the Singapore National Co-operatives Federation between 2005 and 2009.

== Notes ==
Parliament of Singapore
New constituency	Member of Parliament for Eunos SMC; 1984 – 1988	GRC system established
New constituency	Member of Parliament for Eunos GRC (Eunos); 1988 – 1991	Succeeded by Sidek Saniff
Preceded by Sidek Saniff	Member of Parliament for Jalan Besar GRC (Kolam Ayer); 1991 – 1997	Succeeded by Yaacob Ibrahim
