= Eunos Constituency =

Former electoral division in Singapore

Coordinates: 1.3345°N 103.91157°E

Eunos
- Single Member constituency for the Parliament of Singapore
- Region: Singapore

Current constituency
- Created: 1984
- Seats: 1
- Member: Constituency Abolished
- Replaced by: Aljunied GRC

Eunos Constituency was a constituency in Singapore. It used to exist from 1984 to 1988, where it merged parts of Kaki Bukit and Tampines constituencies. It was absorbed into the namesake Eunos Group Representation Constituency.

== Members of Parliament ==
Year	Member of Parliament	Party
1984	Zulkifli Mohammed	PAP

== Electoral results ==
Note: The Elections Department does not include rejected votes when calculating the vote shares of candidates. Hence, all candidates' vote shares will total to 100% at any given election (may not appear so in multi-way contests due to rounding).

=== Elections in 1980s ===
General Election 1984: Eunos
Party	Candidate	Votes	%
PAP	Zulkifli Mohammed	10,494	64.81
SUF	Chong Tung Shang	5,697	35.19
Majority		4,797	29.62
Registered electors		17,615	
Total valid votes		16,191	95.26
Rejected ballots		805	4.74
Turnout		16,996	96.48
PAP win (new seat)			
