= Pasir Panjang Group Representation Constituency =

Former constituency of Singapore

Coordinates: 1.309°N 103.781°E

Pasir Panjang
- Former Group representation constituency
- Region: Central Region, Singapore
- Electorate: 66,600

Former constituency
- Created: 1988
- Abolished: 1991
- Seats: 3
- Party: People's Action Party
- Member: 3
- Local council: Pasir Panjang
- Created from: Pasir Panjang Constituency
- Replaced by: Brickworks Group Representation Constituency

The Pasir Panjang Group Representation Constituency was a group representation constituency (GRC) in Singapore.

== History ==
In 1988, the GRC was created by merging Pasir Panjang, Clementi and West Coast Constituencies.

In 1991, the GRC was fully absorbed into Brickworks GRC.

== Members of Parliament ==
Year	Division	Members	Party
Formation
1988	Alexandra; Brickworks; Queenstown	Abbas Abu Amin; Bernard Chen; Wan Soon Bee	PAP
Abolished (1991)

== Electoral results ==
Note: The Elections Department does not include rejected votes when calculating the vote shares of candidates. Hence, all candidates' vote shares will total to 100% at any given election (may not appear so in multi-way contests due to rounding).

=== Elections in 1980s ===
General Election 1988
Party	Candidate	Votes	%
PAP	Abbas Abu Amin Bernard Chen Wan Soon Bee	38,545	61.57
WP	Gan Eng Guan Mohd Taib Sattar Wee Han Kim	24,059	38.43
Majority		14,486	23.14
Total valid votes		62,604	98.32
Rejected ballots		1,067	1.68
Turnout		63,671	95.6
Registered electors		66,600	
PAP win (new seat)			
