= West Coast Constituency =

Defunct constituency in Singapore

West Coast Constituency was a constituency that existed from 1980 to 1988 in Singapore. It was formed in 1980 by carving out from Bukit Timah Constituency. In 1988, it was merged into Pasir Panjang Group Representation Constituency.

== Member of Parliament ==
| Election | Member of Parliament | Party |
|---|---|---|
| 1980 | Wan Soon Bee | PAP |
| 1984 | Wan Soon Bee | PAP |

== Electoral results ==
Note: The Elections Department does not include rejected votes when calculating the vote shares of candidates. Hence, all candidates' vote shares will total to 100% at any given election (may not appear so in multi-way contests due to rounding).

=== Elections in 1980s ===
General Election 1980: West Coast
| Party | Candidate | Votes | % |
|---|---|---|---|
| PAP | Wan Soon Bee | 15,185 | 84.43 |
| SJP | M Ramasamy | 2,801 | 15.57 |
| Majority | | 12,384 | 68.86 |
| Registered electors | | 18,949 | |
| Turnout | | 17,986 | 94.92 |
| PAP win (new seat) | | | |

General Election 1984: West Coast
| Party | Candidate | Votes | % | ±% |
|---|---|---|---|---|
| PAP | Wan Soon Bee | 19,745 | 75.72 | ▼8.71 |
| SJP | M Ramasamy | 6,331 | 24.28 | ▲8.71 |
| Majority | | 13414 | 51.44 | ▼17.42 |
| Registered electors | | 28,008 | | ▲47.8 |
| Turnout | | 26,076 | 93.1 | ▼1.82 |
| PAP hold | | Swing | ▼8.71 | |
