= Ayer Rajah Single Member Constituency =

Former electoral division in Singapore

Coordinates: 1.322°N 103.749°E

Ayer Rajah
- Former Single Member constituency for the Parliament of Singapore
- Region: Singapore

Former constituency
- Created: 1980
- Abolished: 2006
- Seats: 1
- Member: Constituency Abolished
- Town Council: West Coast
- Replaced by: West Coast GRC

Ayer Rajah Single Member Constituency (SMC) was a single member constituency in Singapore that existed from 1980 to 2006. The SMC had only one Member of Parliament, Tan Cheng Bock, of the People's Action Party from the creation of the SMC till its abolishment.

== History ==
Ayer Rajah Constituency was first formed during the 1980 general election. In 1988, following the establishment of Group representation constituency (GRC) and SMC, it was known as Ayer Rajah Single Member Constituency.

Ayer Rajah SMC was made up of Pandan Gardens estate, Teban Gardens estate, parts of Jurong East New Town and Clementi West New Town. In 2006, prior to the 2006 general election, it was absorbed into the West Coast GRC.

== Member of Parliament ==
Year	Member	Party
Formation
1980	Tan Cheng Bock	PAP
1984	Tan Cheng Bock	PAP
1988	Tan Cheng Bock	PAP
1991	Tan Cheng Bock	PAP
1997	Tan Cheng Bock	PAP
2001	Tan Cheng Bock	PAP
Constituency abolished (2006)

== Electoral results ==
Note: The Elections Department does not include rejected votes when calculating the vote shares of candidates. Hence, all candidates' vote shares will total to 100% at any given election (may not appear so in multi-way contests due to rounding).

=== Elections in 1980s ===
General Election 1980
Party	Candidate	Votes	%
PAP	Tan Cheng Bock	12,400	83.39
SJP	Suib bin Abdul Rahman	2,470	16.61
Majority		9,930	66.78
Total valid votes		14,870	97.20
Rejected ballots		429	2.80
Turnout		15,299	96.91
Registered electors		15,787	
PAP win (new seat)			

General Election 1984
Party	Candidate	Votes	%	±%
PAP	Tan Cheng Bock	14,050	75.44	▼7.95
SJP	Suib bin Abdul Rahman	4,575	24.56	▲7.95
Majority		9,475	50.88	▼15.90
Total valid votes		18,625	96.40	▼0.80
Rejected ballots		695	3.60	▲0.80
Turnout		19,320	96.52	▼0.39
Registered electors		20,017		▲26.79
PAP hold		Swing	▼7.95	

General Election 1988
Party	Candidate	Votes	%	±%
PAP	Tan Cheng Bock	14,824	69.55	▼5.89
WP	Tan Song Gek	6,489	30.45	N/A
Majority		8,335	39.10	▼11.78
Total valid votes		21,313	98.03	▲1.63
Rejected ballots		429	1.97	▼1.63
Turnout		21,742	96.49	▼0.03
Registered electors		22,532		▲12.56
PAP hold		Swing	▼5.89	

=== Elections in 1990s ===
General Election 1991
Party	Candidate	Votes	%	±%
PAP	Tan Cheng Bock	15,038	75.16	▲5.61
PKMS	Mohammed Aziz bin Ibrahim	4,971	24.84	N/A
Majority		10,067	50.32	▲11.22
Total valid votes		20,009	96.28	▼0.12
Rejected ballots		773	3.72	▲0.12
Turnout		20,782	94.95	▼1.54
Registered electors		21,887		▼2.86
PAP hold		Swing	▲5.61	

General Election 1997
Party	Candidate	Votes	%	±%
PAP	Tan Cheng Bock	15,081	73.17	▼1.99
SPP	Sin Kek Tong	5,531	26.83	N/A
Majority		9,550	46.34	▼3.98
Total valid votes		20,612	97.76	▲1.48
Rejected ballots		473	2.24	▼1.48
Turnout		21,085	95.73	▼0.78
Registered electors		22,025		▲0.63
PAP hold		Swing	▼1.99	

=== Elections in 2000s ===
General Election 2001
Party	Candidate	Votes	%	±%
PAP	Tan Cheng Bock	15,024	87.96	▲14.79
DPP	Tan Lead Shake	2,057	12.04	N/A
Majority		12,967	75.92	▲29.58
Total valid votes		17,081	98.05	▲0.29
Rejected ballots		339	1.95	▼0.29
Turnout		17,420	94.29	▼1.44
Registered electors		18,475		▼16.12
PAP hold		Swing	▲14.8	
