= Tang Guan Seng =

Singaporean politician

- 陈原生

Member of the Singapore Parliament for Ang Mo Kio GRC
- In office 2 January 1997 – 18 October 2001
- Preceded by: PAP held
- Succeeded by: PAP held
- Majority: N/A (walkover)

Member of the Singapore Parliament for Hougang SMC
- In office 3 September 1988 – 14 August 1991
- Preceded by: Constituency established
- Succeeded by: Low Thia Khiang (WP)
- Majority: 11,983 (58.96%)

Member of the Singapore Parliament for Khe Bong Constituency
- In office 22 December 1984 – 17 August 1988
- Preceded by: Ho See Beng
- Succeeded by: Constituency abolished
- Majority: 3,641 (17.92%)

Personal details
- Born: Tang Guan Seng; 1948 (age 77–78) Colony of Singapore
- Party: People's Action Party
- Spouse: Tan Soh Nee

Tang Guan Seng (Note: Chinese: 陈原生; Pe̍h-ūe-jī: Tâng Gûan-seng; pinyin: Chén Yuánshēng) (born 1948) is a Singaporean politician. A member of the governing People's Action Party (PAP), he was a Member of the Parliament representing Khe Bong Constituency from 1984 to 1988, Hougang Single Member Constituency (SMC) from 1988 to 1991 and Ang Mo Kio Group Representation Constituency (GRC) from 1997 to 2001.

== Political career ==
At the 1984 Singaporean general election, Tang contested Khe Bong Constituency and won the election against Sim Say Chuan of the Barisan Sosialis with 62.53% of the vote.

At the 1988 Singaporean general election, Khe Bong Constituency was absorbed in to Toa Payoh GRC and Tang contested the newly created Hougang SMC. He won the election against Lim Chiu Liang of the Workers' Party (WP) with 58.96% of the vote.

At the 1991 Singaporean general election, Tang lost the election to Low Thia Khiang of WP with 47.18% of the vote.

In 1993, when Ong Teng Cheong resigned from PAP to run in the 1993 Singaporean presidential election, Tang replaced Ong as the chairman of PAP's Kim Keat branch, as well as the Kim Keat grassroots adviser.

Tang did not re-contest Hougang SMC in the 1997 Singaporean general election but joined the PAP team in Ang Mo Kio GRC where the team won the election unopposed.

In 2004, Tang was appointed to be the political secretary to Senior Minister Goh Chok Tong.

== Personal life ==
Tang is married to Tan Soh Nee.

== Notes ==
Parliament of Singapore
Preceded by Ho See Beng	Member of Parliament for Khe Bong Constituency; 1984–1988	Constituency abolished
New constituency	Member of Parliament for Hougang; 1988–1991	Succeeded by Low Thia Khiang
Preceded by Yeo Toon Chia; Umar Abdul Hamid; Lee Hsien Loong; Lau Ping Sum	Member of Parliament for Ang Mo Kio GRC; 1997–2001; Served alongside: Lee Hsien Loong, Inderjit Singh, Tan Boon Wan and Seng Han Thong	Succeeded by Balaji Sadasivan; Inderjit Singh; Wee Siew Kim; Tan Boon Wan; Lee Hsien Loong; Seng Han Thong
