= Braddell Heights Single Member Constituency =

Former electoral division in Singapore

Coordinates: 1.352°N 103.870°E

Braddell Heights
- Former Single Member constituency for the Parliament of Singapore
- Region: Singapore

Former constituency
- Created: 1976
- Abolished: 1997
- Seats: 1
- Member: Constituency Abolished
- Replaced by: Marine Parade GRC

Braddell Heights Single Member Constituency was a constituency in Singapore. It existed from 1976 to 1997 and was merged into Marine Parade Group Representation Constituency in 1997.

== History ==
In 1976, Braddell Heights Constituency was formed by merging parts of Serangoon Gardens, Thomson, Upper Serangoon, Aljunied and Paya Lebar constituencies together.

In 1984, prior to the 1984 general election, Lee Khoon Choy stepped down from his parliamentary positions and did not contest the elections.

In 1988, following the establishment of Group representation constituency (GRC) and SMC, it was known as Braddell Heights SMC.

In 1997, the SMC was merged into Marine Parade Group Representation Constituency.

== Member of Parliament ==
Year	Member	Party
Formation
1976	Lee Khoon Choy	PAP
1980	Lee Khoon Choy	PAP
1984	Goh Choon Kang	PAP
1988	Goh Choon Kang	PAP
1991	Goh Choon Kang	PAP
Constituency abolished (1997)

== Electoral results ==
Note: The Elections Department does not include rejected votes when calculating the vote shares of candidates. Hence, all candidates' vote shares will total to 100% at any given election (may not appear so in multi-way contests due to rounding).

=== Elections in 1970s ===
General Election 1976
Party	Candidate	Votes	%
PAP	Lee Khoon Choy	Unopposed	
Registered electors		14,031	
PAP win (new seat)			

=== Elections in 1980s ===
General Election 1980
Party	Candidate	Votes	%	±%
PAP	Lee Khoon Choy	Unopposed		
Registered electors		14,519		▲3.48
PAP hold				

General Election 1984
Party	Candidate	Votes	%	±%
PAP	Goh Choon Kang	Unopposed		
Registered electors		14,152		▼2.53
PAP hold				

General Election 1988
Party	Candidate	Votes	%	±%
PAP	Goh Choon Kang	14,862	58.80	N/A
SDP	Sin Kek Tong	10,412	41.20	N/A
Majority		4,450	17.60	N/A
Total valid votes		25,274	98.38	N/A
Rejected ballots		417	1.62	N/A
Turnout		25,691	95.08	N/A
Registered electors		27,019		▲90.92
PAP hold		Swing	N/A	

=== Elections in 1990s ===
General Election 1991
Party	Candidate	Votes	%	±%
PAP	Goh Choon Kang	13,454	52.27	▼6.53
SDP	Sin Kek Tong	12,285	47.73	▲6.53
Majority		1,169	13.06	▼4.54
Total valid votes		25,739	98.15	▼0.23
Rejected ballots		486	1.85	▲0.23
Turnout		26,225	95.56	▲0.48
Registered electors		27,444		▲1.57
PAP hold		Swing	▼6.53	
