= Teck Ghee Single Member Constituency =

Historical constituency of Singapore

Teck Ghee
- Single Member constituency for the Parliament of Singapore
- Region: Singapore

Current constituency
- Created: 1984
- Seats: 1
- Member: Constituency Abolished
- Town Council: Ang Mo Kio
- Replaced by: Ang Mo Kio GRC

Teck Ghee Single Member Constituency was a single member constituency (SMC) in Ang Mo Kio, Singapore. The constituency was formed in 1984 and was abolished in 1991

== History ==
In 1984, the Teck Ghee Constituency was formed by merging parts of Ang Mo Kio and Chong Boon constituencies. Lee Hsien Loong made his political debut in this constituency when it was formed.

In 1988, it was renamed as Teck Ghee Single Member Constituency as part of Singapore's political reforms. In 1991, it was abolished and merged into Ang Mo Kio Group Representation Constituency.

== Member of Parliament ==
Year	Member of Parliament	Party
1984	Lee Hsien Loong	PAP
1988	Lee Hsien Loong	PAP

== Electoral results ==
Note: The Elections Department does not include rejected votes when calculating the vote shares of candidates. Hence, all candidates' vote shares will total to 100% at any given election (may not appear so in multi-way contests due to rounding).

=== Elections in 1980s ===
General Election 1984: Teck Ghee
Party	Candidate	Votes	%	±%
PAP	Lee Hsien Loong	12,794	80.38	
United People's Front	Giam Lai Cheng	3,123	19.62	
Majority		9,671	60.76	
Turnout		16,404	97.3	
PAP win (new seat)				

General Election 1988: Teck Ghee
Party	Candidate	Votes	%	±%
PAP	Lee Hsien Loong	11,512	79.13	−1.25
Independent	Patrick Leong	3,037	20.87	+20.87
Majority		8,475	58.26	−2.5
Turnout		14,952	96.4	−0.9
PAP hold		Swing	-1.25	
