= Boon Lay Single Member Constituency =

Former electoral division in Singapore

Coordinates: 1.3471°N 103.7123°E

Boon Lay
- Former Single Member constituency for the Parliament of Singapore
- Region: Singapore

Former constituency
- Created: 1976
- Abolished: 2001
- Seats: 1
- Member: Constituency Abolished
- Replaced by: West Coast GRC

Boon Lay Single Member Constituency (Traditional Chinese: 文禮單選區; Simplified Chinese: 文礼单选区) was a single member constituency in Boon Lay, Singapore that existed from 1976 to 2001.

== History ==
The constituency was formed in 1976 by carving out part of Jurong Constituency.

In 1988, following the establishment of Group representation constituency (GRC) and SMC, it was known as Boon Lay SMC.

In 2001, it was abolished and absorbed into the West Coast GRC.

== Member of Parliament ==
Year	Member	Party
Formation
1976	Ngeow Pack Hua	PAP
1980	Goh Chee Wee	PAP
1984	Goh Chee Wee	PAP
1988	Goh Chee Wee	PAP
1991	Goh Chee Wee	PAP
1997	Goh Chee Wee	PAP
Constituency abolished (2001)

== Electoral results ==
Note: The Elections Department does not include rejected votes when calculating the vote shares of candidates. Hence, all candidates' vote shares will total to 100% at any given election (may not appear so in multi-way contests due to rounding).

=== Elections in 1970s ===
General Election 1976
Party	Candidate	Votes	%
PAP	Ngeow Pack Hua	11,749	79.82
SJP	Joseph Varghese	2,970	20.18
Majority		8,779	59.64
Total valid votes		14,719	97.66
Rejected ballots		353	2.34
Turnout		15,072	97.26
Registered electors		15,496	
PAP win (new seat)			

=== Elections in 1980s ===
General Election 1980
Party	Candidate	Votes	%	±%
PAP	Goh Chee Wee	15,005	74.19	▼5.63
UF	Tan Chee Kien	5,220	25.81	N/A
Majority		9,785	48.38	▼11.26
Total valid votes		20,225	97.46	▼0.20
Rejected ballots		527	2.54	▲0.20
Turnout		20,752	97.35	▲0.09
Registered electors		21,317		▲37.56
PAP hold		Swing	▼5.63	

General Election 1984
Party	Candidate	Votes	%	±%
PAP	Goh Chee Wee	12,490	69.65	▼4.54
SUF	Reveendran Sasi	5,443	30.35	▲4.54
Majority		7,047	39.30	▼9.08
Total valid votes		17,933	97.13	▼0.22
Rejected ballots		530	2.87	▲0.22
Turnout		18,463	97.36	▲0.01
Registered electors		18,964		▼11.04
PAP hold		Swing	▼4.54	

General Election 1988
Party	Candidate	Votes	%	±%
PAP	Goh Chee Wee	11,317	71.97	▲2.32
PKMS	Salleh bin Mohd Bawthan	4,408	28.03	N/A
Majority		6,909	44.04	▲4.74
Total valid votes		15,725	97.18	▲0.05
Rejected ballots		457	2.82	▼0.05
Turnout		16,182	97.21	▼0.15
Registered electors		16,646		▼12.22
PAP hold		Swing	▲2.32	

=== Elections in 1990s ===
General Election 1991
Party	Candidate	Votes	%	±%
PAP	Goh Chee Wee	10,106	73.27	▲1.30
PKMS	Sahid bin Sahooman	3,686	26.73	▼1.30
Majority		6,420	46.54	▲2.50
Total valid votes		13,792	95.38	▼1.80
Rejected ballots		668	4.62	▲1.80
Turnout		14,460	96.36	▼0.85
Registered electors		15,007		▼9.85
PAP hold		Swing	▲1.30	

General Election 1997
Party	Candidate	Votes	%	±%
PAP	Goh Chee Wee	12,407	66.10	▼7.17
NSP	Christopher Neo Ting Wei	6,362	33.90	N/A
Majority		6,045	32.20	▼14.34
Total valid votes		18,769	97.38	▲2.00
Rejected ballots		505	2.62	▼2.00
Turnout		19,274	96.30	▼0.06
Registered electors		20,014		▲33.36
PAP hold		Swing	▼7.17	
