= Wan Soon Bee =

Singaporean politician

- 阮顺美

Minister of State in the Prime Minister's Office
- In office September 1983 – September 1985
- Prime Minister: Lee Kuan Yew

Member of Parliament for West Coast GRC
- In office 2 January 1997 – 18 October 2001
- Preceded by: Constituency established
- Succeeded by: PAP held

Member of Parliament for Brickworks GRC
- In office 21 August 1991 – 16 December 1996
- Preceded by: Constituency established
- Succeeded by: Constituency abolished

Member of Parliament for Pasir Panjang GRC
- In office 3 September 1988 – 14 August 1991
- Preceded by: Constituency established
- Succeeded by: Constituency abolished

Member of Parliament for West Coast Constituency
- In office 22 December 1980 – 17 August 1988
- Preceded by: Constituency established
- Succeeded by: Constituency abolished
- Majority: 1980: 1984:

Personal details
- Born: Wan Soon Bee; 1939 (age 86–87) Singapore, Straits Settlements
- Party: People's Action Party
- Parent: Wan Hong Cheong (father)
- Education: University of Pisa

Wan Soon Bee (Note: Chinese: 阮顺美; Pe̍h-ōe-jī: Oán Sūn-bí; pinyin: Ruǎn Shùnměi) (born 1939) is a Singaporean former politician. A member of the governing People's Action Party (PAP), he was the Member of Parliament (MP) for West Coast Constituency, Pasir Panjang Group Representation Constituency (GRC), Brickworks GRC and West Coast GRC.

== Early life and education ==
Born in 1939, Wan completed his pre-tertiary education at Raffles Institution and later graduated with a doctorate electronics engineering from the University of Pisa, Italy.

== Political career ==
As he entered politics, Wan eventually became promoted to become political secretary of the People's Action Party from October 1982 to September 1983 and later became the Minister of State in the Prime Minister's Office from September 1983 to 1985.

In the 1988 general election, Wan and his team contested in Pasir Panjang GRC gaining 61.57% of the cast votes in his first contested election and thereby defeating the only other fielded opposing party.

He has since retired from politics as of 2001.

== Other office positions held ==
Wan joined the National Trades Union Congress as deputy director for industrial relations in May 1981 and became deputy secretary general in August. He would serve till 1987.

Wan served as chairman of NTUC Comfort, and later the Comfort Group (1986-1998); was the first advisor to Union of Telecoms Employees of Singapore (1985-1992); the manager at Olivetti (Singapore) Private Limited (Apr 1970-Feb 1981); and the independent director of the Lian Beng Group till 2015.
