= Ulu Pandan Single Member Constituency =

Former Singaporean constituency

Ulu Pandan Single Member Constituency was a constituency in Singapore. It used to exist from 1959 to 1988 as Ulu Pandan Constituency and was renamed as Ulu Pandan Single Member Constituency (SMC) as part of Singapore's political reforms. The SMC was merged into Bukit Timah Group Representation Constituency in 1997.

== Member of Parliament ==
Year	Member of Parliament	Party
Legislative Assembly of Singapore
1959	Mohamed Ariff Suradi	PAP
1963	Chow Chiok Hock	PAP
Parliament of Singapore
1968	Lee Teck Him	PAP
1972	Chiang Hai Ding	PAP
1976	Chiang Hai Ding	PAP
1980	Chiang Hai Ding	PAP
1984	Dixie Tan	PAP
1988	Dixie Tan	PAP
1991	Lim Boon Heng	PAP

== Electoral results ==
Note: The Elections Department does not include rejected votes when calculating the vote shares of candidates. Hence, all candidates' vote shares will total to 100% at any given election (may not appear so in multi-way contests due to rounding).

=== Elections in 1950s ===
General Election 1959
Party	Candidate	Votes	%
PAP	Mohamed Ariff Suradi	4,420	45.44
LSP	M. Karthigesu	284	2.92
SPA	Leslie Rayner	3,100	31.87
Independent	Lim Choon Mong	573	4.87
Independent	Chua Kim Toh	183	1.89
Independent	S. Khalaff	1,083	11.13
Independent	Low Boon Kiat	361	3.71
Majority		1,320	13.57
Registered electors		11,017	
Turnout		10,004	90.81
PAP win (new seat)			

=== Elections in 1960s ===
General Election 1963
Party	Candidate	Votes	%	±%
PAP	Chow Chiok Hock	5,000	44.86	N/A
SA	Anang b. H. A. Manan	1,729	15.51	N/A
Partai Rakyat	Johari bin Sonto	2,967	26.62	N/A
UPP	Ler Chin Tee	1,450	13.01	N/A
Majority		2,033	18.24	▲4.67
Registered electors		11,866		▲7.71
Turnout		11,146	93.93	▲3.12
PAP hold		Swing	▼0.58	

General Election 1968
Party	Candidate	Votes	%	±%
PAP	Lee Teck Him	Unopposed		
Registered electors		13,289		▲11.99
PAP hold				

=== Elections in the 1970s ===
General Election 1972
Party	Candidate	Votes	%	±%
PAP	Chiang Hai Ding	9,378	71.83	N/A
United National Front	Ang Kheng Kwan	3,678	28.17	N/A
Majority		5,700	43.66	N/A
Registered electors		14,485		▲9
Turnout		13,056	90.13	N/A
PAP hold				

General Election 1976
Party	Candidate	Votes	%	±%
PAP	Chiang Hai Ding	Unopposed		
Registered electors		16,343		▲12.83
PAP hold				

=== Elections in the 1980s ===
General Election 1980
Party	Candidate	Votes	%	±%
PAP	Chiang Hai Ding	Unopposed		
Registered electors		22,048		▲34.91
PAP hold				

General Election 1984
Party	Candidate	Votes	%	±%
PAP	Dixie Tan	Unopposed		
Registered electors		22,761		▲3.23
PAP hold				
