= Dixie Tan =

Singaporean politician

- 陈李慕真

Member of the Singapore Parliament for Ulu Pandan SMC
- In office 22 December 1984 – 31 August 1991
- Preceded by: Chiang Hai Ding
- Succeeded by: Lim Boon Heng

Personal details
- Born: Dixie Lee Mo Chun; 6 November 1935 Singapore, Straits Settlements
- Died: 23 April 2014 (aged 78) Singapore
- Party: People's Action Party
- Spouse: Tan Ngoh Chuan
- Children: 4 (including one who predeceased his parents)
- Profession: Cardiologist
- Website: Dixie Tan Memorial

Dixie Tan-Lee Mo Chun (Note: Chinese: 陈李慕真; Jyutping: Can^{4} Lei^{5} Mou^{6} Zan^{1}; pinyin: Chén-Lǐ Mùzhēn) (née Lee; 6 November 1935 – 23 April 2014) was a Singaporean cardiologist and politician who served as a Member of Parliament for the Ulu Pandan constituency from 1984 to 1991. She was a member of the People's Action Party (PAP).

== Career ==
In 1984, Tan became a member of the Parliament of Singapore after she was nominated unopposed on Nomination Day, shortly before the 1984 general election. Tan became one of three new female members to enter Parliament in 1984, together with Aline Wong and Yu-Foo Yee Shoon. The trio became the first women to serve in Parliament in fourteen years. She represented Ulu Pandan in parliament until her retirement in 1991. She then worked as a family and marital therapist.

== Death ==
Tan died at Singapore General Hospital on 23 April 2014, aged 78, following a two-month illness with brain cancer. She was survived by her husband, cardiothoracic surgeon Dr. Tan Ngoh Chuan, and their three children. A fourth child died in 2013. Her funeral was held at the Paya Lebar Methodist Church.
