= Abbas Abu Amin =

Singaporean politician (born 1935)

Abbas bin Abu Amin (Note: Jawi: عباس بن أبو أمين) (born 25 January 1935) is a former politician from the People's Action Party (PAP) who has served as the Member of Parliament (MP) for Pasir Panjang Single Member Constituency (SMC) from 23 December 1980 to 17 August 1988 and Pasir Panjang Group Representation Constituency (GRC) from 3 September 1988 to 14 August 1991.

Born in Malacca, his father was a police officer and he is raised by his grandparents. He studied at Kota Raja Malay School and Victoria School. He went on to the Teachers' Training College and joined the Singapore Armed Forces (SAF) in 1966. He rose to the rank of Major in the Singapore Army. Abbas was also the Chairman of the Football Association of Singapore from 1988 to 1991, and an active trade unionist in National Trades Union Congress. His son is Ahmad Nizam Abbas, a lawyer.

== Military career ==
Abbas served 22 years in the regular service with an additional 7 year as a reserve officer for the Singapore Armed Forces.1970 Secretary of SAFSA, 1973 - 1974 attended army courses at Bandung, 1975 - 1977 Commanding Officer School of Method Instruction SAFTI SAF School, 1978 - 1979 Commanding Officer of SAF Boys School. Abbas left the military service in October 1980 to pursue a career in politics but remained a Commanding Officer of Reservist People Defense Force as Commander 145 Battalion for the following 7 years.
