= 2nd Legislative Assembly of Singapore =

←	1st Legislative Assembly	3rd Legislative Assembly	→
Composition at the start of the 2nd Legislative Assembly of Singapore
PAP (43)	SPA (4)	UMNO (3)	Independent (1)

Overview
- Legislative body: Legislative Assembly of Singapore
- Meeting place: Old Parliament House
- Term: 1 July 1959 – 3 September 1963
- Election: 30 May 1959
- Government: People's Action Party
- Opposition: Singapore People's Alliance; United Malays National Organisation; United People's Party (from 14 July 1961); Barisan Sosialis (from 29 July 1961)

Legislative Assembly of Singapore
- Members: 51
- Speaker: Sir George Oehlers
- Leader of the House: Toh Chin Chye
- Prime Minister: Lee Kuan Yew
- Leader of the Opposition: Lim Yew Hock
- Party control: PAP supermajority (until 20 July 1961); PAP majority (from 20 July 1961)

Sessions
- 1st: 1 July 1959 – 1 June 1960
- 2nd: 20 July 1960 – 20 July 1961
- 3rd: 31 October 1961 – 13 July 1962
- 4th: 27 March 1963 – 1 August 1963

The 2nd Legislative Assembly of Singapore was a meeting of the Legislative Assembly of Singapore which convened from 1 July 1959 to 3 September 1963.

== Officeholders ==
- Speaker: Sir George Oehlers (Independent)
- Deputy Speaker:
  - G. Kandasamy (Kampong Kapor, PAP), until 24 September 1961
  - John Mammen (Telok Blangah, PAP), from 16 November 1961
- Prime Minister: Lee Kuan Yew (Tanjong Pagar, PAP)
- Deputy Prime Minister: Toh Chin Chye (Rochore, PAP)
- Leader of the Opposition: Lim Yew Hock (Cairnhill, SPA)
- Leader of the House: Toh Chin Chye (Rochore, PAP)
- Government Party Whip: Lee Khoon Choy (Bukit Panjang, PAP)

== Composition ==
Party	Members	
Party	At election	At dissolution
People's Action Party	43	25
Barisan Sosialis	0	14
Singapore People's Alliance	4	4
United Malays National Organisation	3	3
United People's Party	0	2
Independent	1	2
Vacant seats	0	1
Total	51	51
Government majority	35	0

== Members ==
Constituency	Members	Party
Aljunied	S. V. Lingam	People's Action Party (Note: Expelled from the People's Action Party (PAP) on 27 July 1960, and later affiliated with the United People's Party from 14 July 1961 until 4 August 1962, before returning to the PAP on 16 August 1962.)
Anson	Baharuddin Ariff (Note: Baharuddin Ariff died on 20 April 1961.)	People's Action Party
Anson	David Marshall (Note: David Marshall was by-elected on 15 July 1961, to succeed Baharuddin Ariff.)	Workers' Party (Note: Resigned from the Workers' Party on 18 January 1963.)
Bras Basah	Hoe Puay Choo	People's Action Party (Note: Left the People's Action Party on 3 July 1962, and was later affiliated with Barisan Sosialis from 11 August 1962.)
Bukit Merah	S. Ramaswamy	People's Action Party
Bukit Panjang	Lee Khoon Choy	People's Action Party
Bukit Timah	Ya'acob Mohamed	People's Action Party
Cairnhill	Lim Yew Hock	Singapore People's Alliance
Changi	Teo Hock Guan	People's Action Party (Note: Expelled from the People's Action Party on 20 July 1961, and was later affiliated with Barisan Sosialis from 29 July 1961.)
Chua Chu Kang	Ong Chang Sam	People's Action Party
Crawford	K. M. Byrne	People's Action Party
Delta	Chan Choy Siong	People's Action Party
Farrer Park	A. P. Rajah	Independent
Geylang East	Ismail Rahim	People's Action Party
Geylang Serai	Abdul Hamid Jumat	UMNO
Geylang West	Yong Nyuk Lin	People's Action Party
Havelock	Low Por Tuck	People's Action Party
Hong Lim	Ong Eng Guan (Note: Ong Eng Guan resigned on 29 December 1960, but was later by-elected on 29 April 1961.)	People's Action Party (Note: Expelled from the People's Action Party on 27 July 1960, and was later affiliated with the United People's Party from 14 July 1961.)
Jalan Besar	Chan Chee Seng	People's Action Party
Jalan Kayu	Tan Cheng Tong	People's Action Party
Joo Chiat	C. H. Koh	Singapore People's Alliance
Jurong	Chor Yeok Eng	People's Action Party
Kallang	Buang Omar Junid	People's Action Party
Kampong Glam	S. Rajaratnam	People's Action Party
Kampong Kapor	G. Kandasamy	People's Action Party
Kampong Kembangan	Ali Alwi	UMNO
Kreta Ayer	Goh Keng Swee	People's Action Party
Moulmein	Lin You Eng	People's Action Party
Mountbatten	Seow Peck Leng	Singapore People's Alliance
Nee Soon	Sheng Nam Chin	People's Action Party
Pasir Panjang	Tee Kim Leng	People's Action Party
Paya Lebar	Tan Kia Gan	People's Action Party
Punggol	Ng Teng Kian	People's Action Party
Queenstown	Lee Siew Choh	People's Action Party
River Valley	Lim Cheng Lock	People's Action Party
Rochore	Toh Chin Chye	People's Action Party
Sembawang	Ahmad Ibrahim (Note: Ahmad Ibrahim died on 21 August 1962.)	People's Action Party
Sepoy Lines	Wee Toon Boon	People's Action Party
Serangoon Gardens	Leong Keng Seng	People's Action Party
Siglap	Sahorah Ahmat	People's Action Party
Southern Islands	Ahmad Jabri Akib	UMNO
Stamford	Fung Yin Ching	People's Action Party
Tampines	Goh Chew Chua	People's Action Party
Tanglin	Thio Chan Bee	Singapore People's Alliance
Tanjong Pagar	Lee Kuan Yew	People's Action Party
Telok Ayer	Ong Pang Boon	People's Action Party
Telok Blangah	John Mammen	People's Action Party
Thomson	S. T. Bani	People's Action Party
Tiong Bahru	Lee Teck Him	People's Action Party
Toa Payoh	Wong Soon Fong	People's Action Party
Ulu Pandan	Ariff Suradi	People's Action Party
Upper Serangoon	Chan Sun Wing	People's Action Party
