= List of Singaporean electoral divisions (1959–1963) =

The following is a list of Singaporean electoral divisions from 1959 to 1963 that served as constituencies that elected members to the 2nd Legislative Assembly of Singapore in the 1959 Singaporean general elections. The number of seats was increased to 51 while the People's Action Party (PAP) won a landslide victory with 43 seats.

== Constituencies ==
District	Code	Electorate (1959)	Polling Districts
Aljunied	AJ	13,255	3
Anson	AS	9,921	2
Bras Basah	BB	11,193	2
Bukit Merah	BM	11,286	3
Bukit Panjang	BP	11,984	8
Bukit Timah	BT	11,285	7
Cairnhill	CA	12,239	5
Changi	CH	11,199	6
Chua Chu Kang	CK	6,889	6
Crawford	CF	12,031	3
Delta	D	14,954	2
Farrer Park	FP	10,293	3
Geylang East	GE	15,562	3
Geylang Serai	GS	14,447	4
Geylang West	GW	15,570	2
Havelock	H	15,909	3
Hong Lim	HL	12,667	3
Jalan Besar	JB	13,877	4
Jalan Kayu	JK	8,690	3
Joo Chiat	JC	15,257	4
Jurong	J	7,176	5
Kallang	KL	12,939	4
Kampong Glam	KG	10,934	3
Kampong Kapor	KK	12,736	3
Kampong Kembangan	KN	13,007	4
Kreta Ayer	KA	14,173	2
Moulmein	MM	10,095	3
Mountbatten	MB	10,212	4
Nee Soon	NS	8,694	3
Pasir Panjang	PP	6,631	2
Paya Lebar	PL	12,089	4
Punggol	PG	9,893	5
Queenstown	Q	10,634	2
River Valley	RV	10,594	3
Rochore	R	12,436	3
Sembawang	SB	8,859	3
Sepoy Lines	SP	10,347	5
Serangoon Gardens	SG	8,631	2
Siglap	SL	14,693	5
Southern Islands	SI	5,325	9
Stamford	ST	12,392	3
Tampines	TM	11,468	6
Tanglin	T	9,127	3
Tanjong Pagar	TP	11,939	2
Telok Ayer	TA	13,998	3
Telok Blangah	TL	13,202	4
Thomson	TH	10,067	3
Tiong Bahru	TG	12,151	5
Toa Payoh	TY	12,551	3
Ulu Pandan	UP	11,017	2
Upper Serangoon	US	11,279	4
