= List of Singaporean electoral divisions (1976–1980) =

The following is a list of Singaporean electoral divisions from 1976 to 1980 that served as constituencies that elected Members of Parliament (MPs) to the 4th Parliament of Singapore in the 1976 Singaporean general elections. The number of seats in Parliament had increased by four to 69 seats.

In July 1976, the Electoral Boundaries Delineation Committee recommended to adjust the number of electorate to between 13,000 and 20,000. The change resulted in six constituencies being abolished, 11 constituencies had their electoral boundaries changed, and ten new constituencies created. The number of constituencies increased from 65 to 69. The recommendations were accepted.

== Changes ==
The abolished constituencies were:

- Bras Basah. Merged with River Valley. Ho See Beng therefore moved from Bras Basah to Khe Bong (just reflecting new development)
- Crawford. Merged with Kampong Glam. Ang Kok Peng therefore moved from Crawford to Buona Vista (just reflecting new development)
- Hong Lim. Merged with Telok Ayer. Lee Khoon Choy therefore moved from Hong Lim to Braddell Heights (just reflecting new development)
- Kampong Kapor. Merged with Jalan Besar. Yeo Toon Chia therefore moved from Kampong Kapor to Ang Mo Kio (just reflecting new development)
- Sepoy Lines. Merged with Tanjong Pagar. Wee Toon Boon resigned.
- Stamford. Merged with Rochore. Andrew Fong therefore moved from Stamford to Kampong Chai Chee (just in view of the new Bedok constituency)

The ten new constituencies were:

- Ang Mo Kio (from Nee Soon)
- Bedok (from Siglap)
- Boon Lay (from Jurong)
- Braddell Heights (from Paya Lebar, Serangoon Gardens, Thomson and Upper Serangoon)
- Brickworks (from Leng Kee & Pasir Panjang)
- Buona Vista (from Queenstown)
- Khe Bong (from Kuo Chuan & Toa Payoh)
- Kolam Ayer (from Geylang West, Jalan Besar and Potong Pasir)
- Marine Parade (from Katong and land reclamation)
- Radin Mas (merged part of Henderson & Telok Blangah)

== Constituencies ==
District	Polling Districts as of 1976 redrawing	Polling Districts	Total
Alexandra	AL 01 - AL 02	AL 01 - AL 02	2
Aljunied	AJ 01	AJ 01 - AJ 02	2
Ang Mo Kio	NS 02, SG 03, TH 02	AM 01 - AM 04	4
Anson	SP 02, TL 01 - TL 02, TG 01	AS 01 - AS 04	4
Bedok	SL 01	BD 01 - BD 03	3
Boon Lay	JR 03, JR 05	BY 01 - BY 02	2
Boon Teck	KM 02, TY 01	BN 01 - BN 02	2
Braddell Heights	PL 01, SG 01, SG 04, TH 03, US 03	BL 01 - BL 04	4
Brickworks	LK 01 - LK 02, PP 01	BW 01 - BW 02	2
Bukit Batok	BK 01 - BK 06	BK 01 - BK 06	6
Bukit Ho Swee	KS 02	BH 01 - BH 02	2
Bukit Merah	BM 01 - BM 02	BM 01 - BM 02	2
Bukit Panjang	BP 01 - BP 06	BP 01 - BP 06	6
Bukit Timah	BT 01 - BT 04	BT 01 - BT 04	4
Buona Vista	UP 01	BV 01 - BV 02	2
Cairnhill	FP 01, TN 02	CA 01 - CA 05	5
Changi	CH 01 - CH 06	CH 01 - CH 06	6
Chua Chu Kang	CK 01 - CK 06	CK 01 - CK 06	6
Delta	DL 01 - DL 02	DL 01 - DL 02	2
Farrer Park	MM 01 - MM 02	FP 01 - FP 03	3
Geylang East	GE 01 - GE 03	GE 01 - GE 03	3
Geylang Serai	AJ 02	GS 01 - GS 03	3
Geylang West	GW 01 - GW 02	GW 01 - GW 02	2
Havelock	SP 04 - SP 05	HK 01 - HK 02	2
Henderson	BM 02	HS 01 - HS 03	3
Jalan Besar	KK 02 - KK 03, CR 02 - CR 03	JB 01 - JB 04	4
Jalan Kayu	JK 01 - JK 03	JK 01 - JK 03	3
Joo Chiat	JC 01 - JC 04	JC 01 - JC 03	3
Jurong	JR 01 - JR 04	JR 01 - JR 03	3
Kallang	PS 01, W 02	KL 01 - KL 03	3
Kampong Chai Chee	KC 01 - KC 03	KC 01 - KC 03	3
Kampong Glam	CR 01 - CR 02, BB 02	KG 01 - KG 03	3
Kampong Kembangan	SL 03	KN 01 - KN 02	2
Kampong Ubi	KC 03, KN 03	KU 01 - KU 03	3
Katong	KT 01 - KT 02	KT 01 - KT 02	2
Khe Bong	KH 01, TY 01 - TY 02	KE 01 - KE 03	3
Kim Keat	KM 01 - KM 02	KM 01 - KM 02	2
Kim Seng	KS 01 - KS 02	KS 01	1
Kolam Ayer	GW 02, KL 02, PS 02	KY 01 - KY 03	3
Kreta Ayer	SP 04 - SP 05	KA 01 - KA 02	2
Kuo Chuan	KH 03	KH 01 - KH 03	3
Leng Kee	AL 02, LK 01 - LK 02	LK 01 - LK 02	2
MacPherson	AJ 02	MP 01 - MP 02	2
Marine Parade	JC 02 - JC 04	MA 01 - MA 02	2
Moulmein	TP 03, TY 03, W 02	MM 01 - MM 03	3
Mountbatten	MB 01 - MB 02	MB 01 - MB 02	2
Nee Soon	NS 01 - NS 03	NS 01 - NS 03	3
Pasir Panjang	PP 01 - PP 02	PP 01 - PP 02	2
Paya Lebar	PL 01 - PL 04	PL 01 - PL 04	4
Potong Pasir	KM 01, PS 01 - PS 02	PS 01 - PS 02	2
Punggol	PG 01 - PG 05	PG 01 - PG 05	5
Queenstown	QT 01 - QT 02	QT 01 - QT 02	2
Radin Mas	HS 02, TL 02 - TL 03	RM 01 - RM 03	3
River Valley	QT 02, ST 02, TN 03	RV 01 - RV 03	3
Rochore	KK 01, KK 03, ST 03	RC 01 - RC 03	3
Sembawang	BP 06, SB 01 - SB 03	SB 01 - SB 03	3
Serangoon Gardens	SG 01 - SG 04	SG 01 - SG 03	3
Siglap	SL 01 - SL 03	SL 01 - SL 03	3
Tampines	TM 01 - TM 05	TM 01 - TM 05	5
Tanglin	UP 02	TN 01 - TN 03	3
Tanjong Pagar	SP 01, TP 01 - TP 03	TP 01 - TP 03	3
Telok Ayer	HL 01 - HL 02, ST 01, BS 01	TA 01 - TA 03	3
Telok Blangah	TL 01 - TL 02	TL 01 - TL 02	2
Thomson	TH 01 - TH 02	TH 01 - TH 02	2
Tiong Bahru	SP 02 - SP 03	TG 01 - TG 04	4
Toa Payoh	BN 02, KH 02, TY 02 - TY 03	TY 01 - TY 03	3
Ulu Pandan	PP 02, UP 01	UP 01 - UP 03	3
Upper Serangoon	US 01 - US 03	US 01 - US 04	4
Whampoa	W 01 - W 02	W 01 - W 02	2
