= 1976 Singaporean general election =

- 23 December 1976

All 69 seats in Parliament 35 seats needed for a majority
- Registered: 1,095,817 (Note: 238,520 of the 1,095,817 voters were registered in uncontested constituencies, leaving 857,297 voters able to vote.)
- Turnout: 95.08% (▲1.53pp)
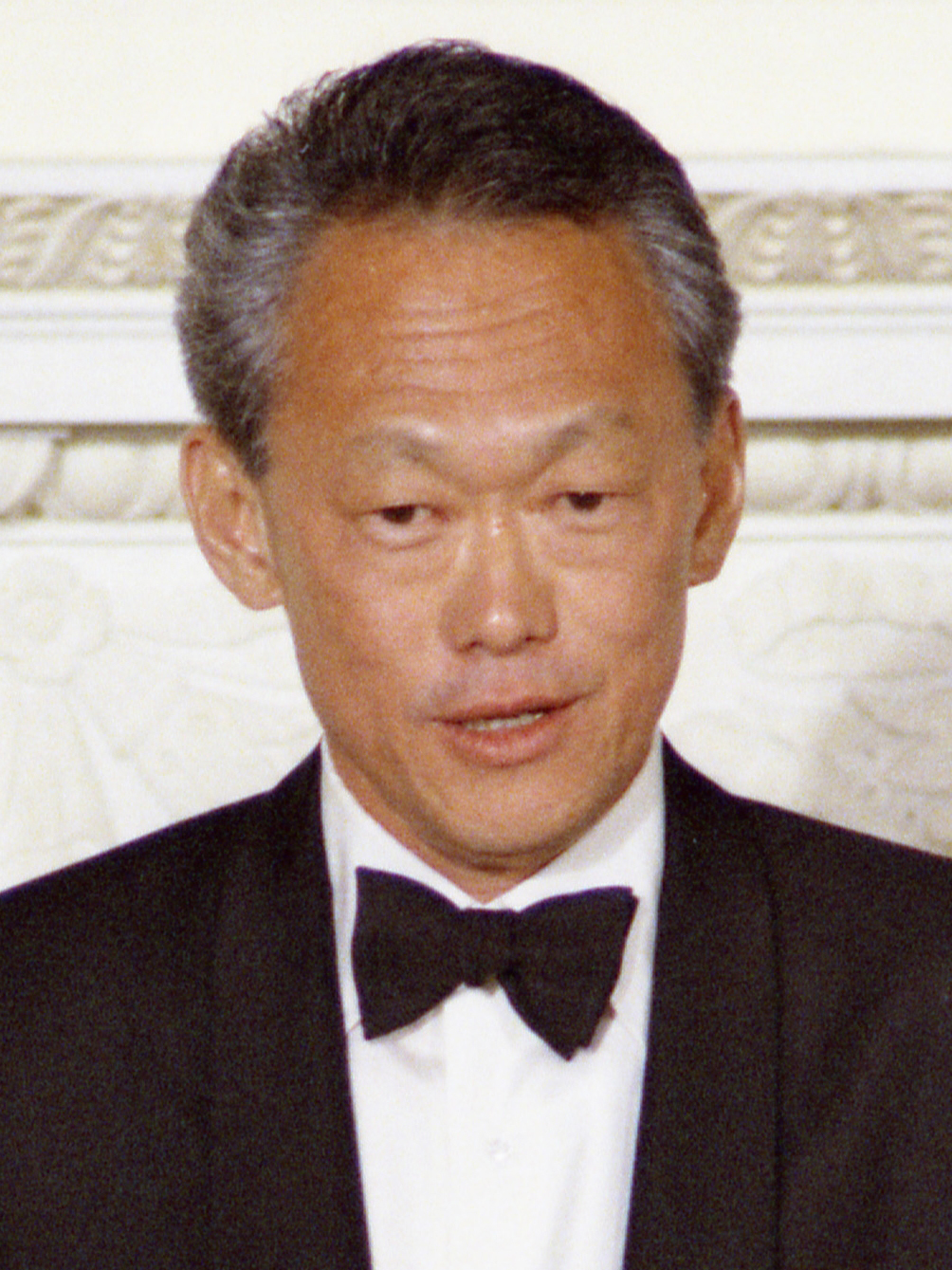
	First party
Leader	Lee Kuan Yew
Party	PAP
Leader's seat	Tanjong Pagar
Last election	70.43%, 65 seats
Seats won	69
Seat change	▲4
Popular vote	590,169
Percentage	74.09%
Swing	▲3.66pp
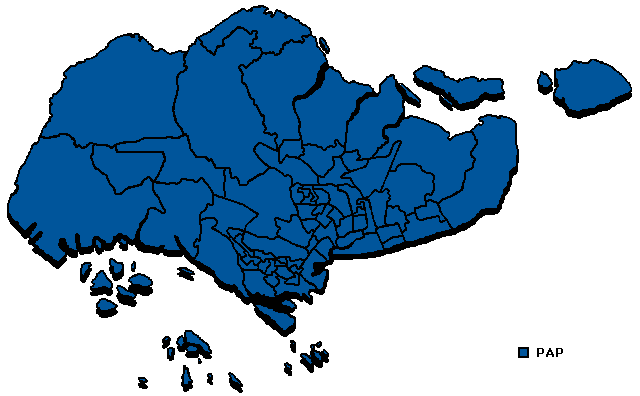
- Results by constituency
Prime Minister before election
Lee Kuan Yew
PAP
Prime Minister after election
Lee Kuan Yew
PAP

General elections were held in Singapore on 23 December 1976 to elect all 69 members of Parliament. They were the fifth general elections since the introduction of self-government in 1959 and the third since Singapore's independence in 1965. The number of parliamentary seats increased from 65 to 69 due to changes in electoral boundaries and the increase in population. Out of the 69 constituencies, 53 were contested, while 16 were won uncontested by the People's Action Party (PAP). A total of 124 candidates participated in the elections, including 122 from political parties and two independents.

The ruling PAP, led by Prime Minister Lee Kuan Yew, won all 69 seats in another landslide victory, marking its third consecutive clean sweep since 1966. The total electorate surpassed one million for the first time in Singapore's history, but only 857,297 were eligible to vote due to uncontested constituencies. The PAP secured 590,169 of the 796,572 valid votes cast, accounting for 74.09% of the popular vote. Voting, which is compulsory, reached a turnout of 95% among the eligible voters in the contested constituencies.

Opposition parties, including the Workers' Party (WP), the Barisan Sosialis (BS), the United Front (UF) and others, contested the elections but failed to win any seats. The WP fielded 22 candidates, while the UF fielded 14. The results maintained the PAP's complete control of Parliament and extended its one-party rule.

The 1976 elections also marked the first election with an increase of the electoral deposit, with the amount determined by the MP's annual allowance divided by eight and rounded to the nearest $100 (future elections determined the deposit by 8% of total allowance and rounded to the nearest $500), which was set to $1,200, up by $700.

== Electoral system ==
The 69 members of Parliament were elected from 69 single-member constituencies, an increase from 65 used for the previous elections in 1972.

== Timeline ==
Date	Event
6 December	Dissolution of 3rd Parliament
13 December	Nomination Day
23 December	Polling Day
7 February 1977	Opening of 4th Parliament

== Constituencies ==
In July 1976, the Electoral Boundaries Delineation Committee recommended to adjust the number of electorate to between 13,000 and 20,000. The change resulted in six constituencies being abolished, 11 constituencies had their electoral boundaries changed, and ten new constituencies created. The number of constituencies increased from 65 to 69. The recommendations were accepted.

Constituency	Changes
New Constituencies
Ang Mo Kio	Carved from parts of Nee Soon, Serangoon Gardens and Thomson
Bedok	Carved from Siglap
Boon Lay	Carved from Jurong
Buona Vista	Carved from Ulu Pandan
Braddell Heights	Carved from Paya Lebar, Serangoon Gardens, Thomson and Upper Serangoon
Brickworks	Carved from Leng Kee and Pasir Panjang
Khe Bong	Carved from Kuo Chuan and Toa Payoh
Kolam Ayer	Carved from Geylang West, Kallang and Potong Pasir
Marine Parade	Carved from Joo Chiat
Radin Mas	Carved from Henderson and Telok Blangah
Defunct Constituencies
Bras Basah	Absorbed to Kampong Glam and Telok Ayer
Crawford	Absorbed to Jalan Besar and Kampong Glam
Hong Lim	Absorbed to Telok Ayer
Kampong Kapor	Absorbed to Jalan Besar
Sepoy Lines	Absorbed to Anson, Tanjong Pagar and Tiong Bahru
Stamford	Absorbed to River Valley and Telok Ayer

== MPs not standing for re-election ==
Six MPs left politics in this election, which include Home Affairs minister Wong Lin Ken.

MP	Party	Constituency	Elected in
Ariff Suradi	PAP	Kampong Kembangan	1959
Abdul Aziz Karim	PAP	Kallang	1968
L. P. Rodrigo	PAP	Serangoon Gardens	1968
Sim Boon Woo	PAP	Changi	1963
Tay Boon Too	PAP	Paya Lebar	1966
Wong Lin Ken	PAP	Alexandra	1968

== New candidates ==
Of the 42 new candidates introduced in the election, the PAP introduced Goh Chok Tong, the second Prime Minister, as well as future speaker Tan Soo Khoon, and cabinet minister Dhanabalan Suppiah, while Chiam See Tong, a lawyer of the Philip Wong & Co. law firm and future opposition figure, also made its electoral debut running as an independent candidate in Cairnhill.

New candidate	Party	Constituency
Ahmad Haleem	PAP	Telok Blangah
Amnah Kuong Hussein	PKMS	Geylang Serai
Ang Bee Lian	UPF	Kampong Glam
A. Balakrishnan	WP	Moulmein
Chan Keng Sieng	WP	Chua Chu Kang
Chetty Rajah	UF	Kolam Ayer
Chiam See Tong	Independent	Cairnhill
C. H. Crabb	WP	Serangoon Gardens
S. Dhanabalan	PAP	Kallang
Edward Chua	WP	Alexandra
Goh Chok Tong	PAP	Marine Parade
Hashim Mukayat	UPF	Buona Vista
Ho Juan Thai	WP	Bukit Panjang
Hoe Boon Teck	WP	Henderson
Hwang Ban Cheong	UF	Bukit Ho Swee
V. Joseph	SJP	Boon Lay
Lau Teik Soon	PAP	Serangoon Gardens
Lee Nai Choo	Independent	Moulmein
Lim Tiong Hock	UF	Geylang West
M. Ameer Batcha	WP	Joo Chiat
Mansor Sukaimi	PAP	Kampong Kembangan
Mohamed Shariff Yahya	WP	Whampoa
Monsor Rahman	UF	Marine Parade
Ng Kwee Lim	UF	Upper Serangoon
Ng Lep Chong	UF	Leng Kee
Ng Seng Chua	BS	Boon Teck
Ngeow Pack Hua	PAP	Boon Lay
Ngoei Soon On	WP	Havelock
Ow Chin Hock	PAP	Leng Kee
Sahid Sahooman	PKMS	Kampong Ubi
Sidek Saniff	PAP	Kolam Ayer
Sim Peng Kim	PF	Bedok
Sim Say Chuan	BS	Khe Bong
Sulaiman Jaffar	SJP	Bukit Batok
Tan Cheng San	PAP	Paya Lebar
Tan Soo Khoon	PAP	Alexandra
Tan Yong Sin	WP	Punggol
Teo Chong Tee	PAP	Changi
Teo Kim Hoe	UPF	Tiong Bahru
Santi Thevar	UPF	Sembawang
Weerappulli K. W. B.	UF	Siglap
Zainal Abiden Mohd Ali	WP	Changi

== Campaign ==
A total of 124 candidates contested the election. The ruling PAP was the only party to contest every one of 69 constituencies, while the five other opposition parties (namely Barisan Sosialis, the Singapore Justice Party, PKMS, the United Front and the Workers' Party) formed a Joint Opposition Council to cooperate at the polls. The Workers' Party nominated 22 candidates and United Front 14; no other party put forward more than six candidates, while two candidates ran as independents.

=== Wee Toon Boon's resignation ===
In April 1975, Minister of State Wee Toon Boon was charged with five counts of corruption under Section 6(a) of the Prevention of Corruption Act, involving on receiving bribes totaling S$839,023 (approximately $2,374,286.61 in 2026) from Indonesian property developer Lauw Tjin Ho (also known as Atang Latief) through Wee's former schoolmate and Lauw's company secretary, Ong Keng Kok, which include a S$532,000 bungalow, free renovations, air tickets, and bank overdrafts from a property developer whom he aided using his father's account. On 5 September 1975, the court charged Wee with all five counts of corruption, but did not disqualify from the Parliament due to the duration (under one year per the constitution) served in imprisonment, though he had since lodged an appeal. Former Workers' Party founder and MP David Marshall served as his lawyer for his case. On 13 July 1976, the Court of Appeal approved his appeal, reducing his sentence from the initial 54 months to 18 months. Wee however, resigned from the Sepoy Lines two months later, and within three months before the third Parliament being dissolved.

== Results ==
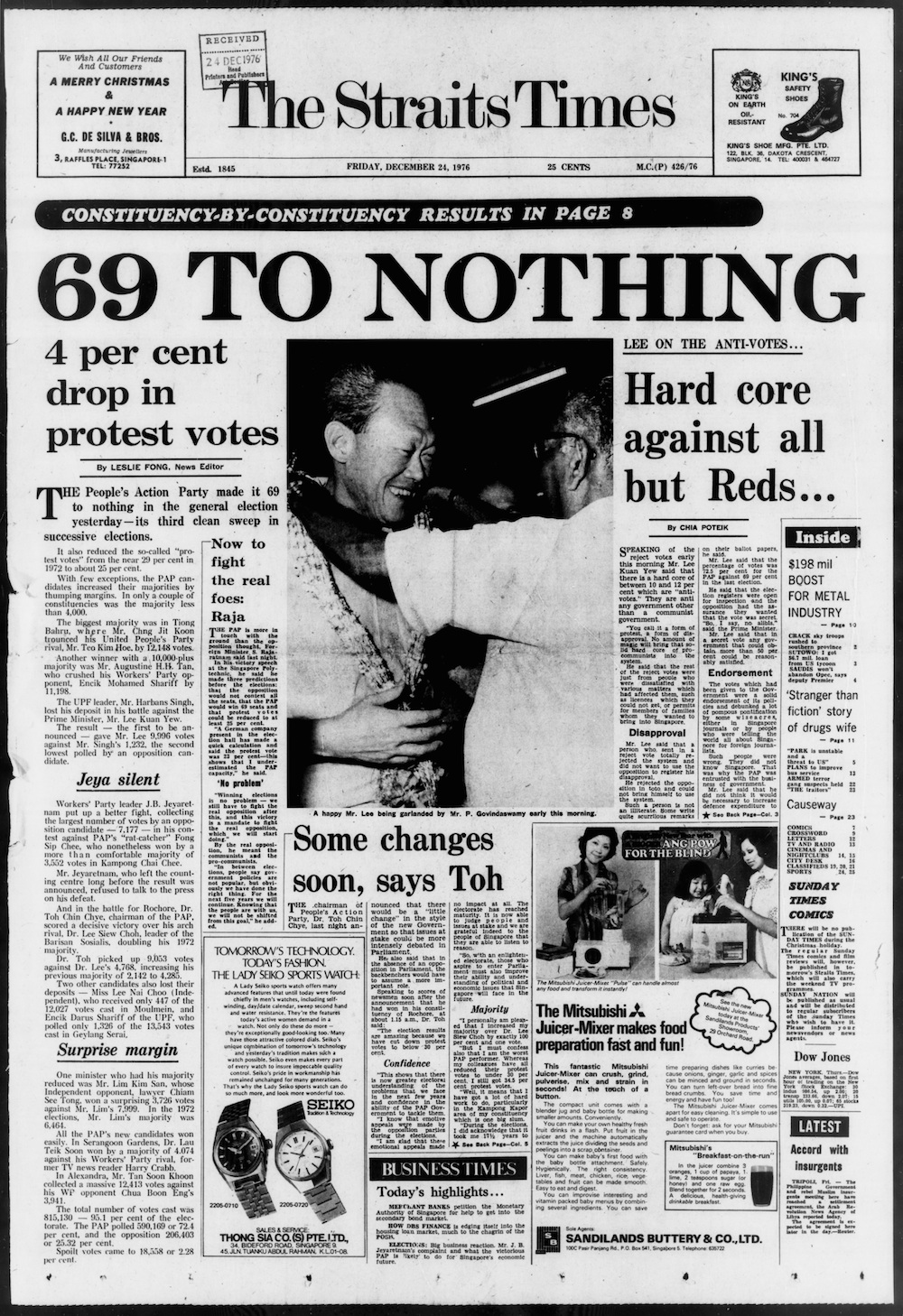
The front page of The Straits Times on 24 December

For the third consecutive election, the PAP won every one of the 53 contested seats with a 74.09% popular vote, along with Lee Kuan Yew's seat of Tanjong Pagar polled 89.03% of the valid votes cast. The Workers' Party secretary-general J. B. Jeyaretnam had the best performance among opposition parties, winning with 40.08% of the votes in Kampong Chai Chee. Three candidates garnered under one-eighth of the votes and had forfeited their $1,200 election deposits. The voter turnout was 95.08%.

Popular vote
1. PAP (74.1%)
2. WP (11.6%)
3. UF (6.70%)
4. BS (3.19%)
5. Others (4.47%)
Seats won
1. 16 seats (PAP; uncontested) (23.2%)
2. 53 seats (PAP; contested) (76.8%)

Party	Votes	%	+/–	Seats	+/–
People's Action Party	590,169	74.09	+3.66	69	+4
Workers' Party	91,966	11.55	–0.65	0	0
United Front	53,373	6.70	New	0	New
Barisan Sosialis	25,411	3.19	–1.44	0	0
United People's Front	14,233	1.79	New	0	New
Pertubuhan Kebangsaan Melayu Singapura	9,230	1.16	–0.19	0	0
Singapore Justice Party	5,199	0.65	New	0	New
People's Front	2,818	0.35	–2.66	0	0
Independents	4,173	0.52	–0.48	0	0
Total	796,572	100.00	–	69	+4
Valid votes	796,572	97.72			
Invalid/blank votes	18,558	2.28			
Total votes	815,130	100.00			
Registered voters/turnout	1,095,817	95.08			
Source: Nohlen et al., Singapore Elections

Opposition parties contested vote
Party	Votes
PKMS	28.33%
WP	27.91%
BS	27.05%
PF	26.22%
SUF	25.26%
SJP	17.83%
Independents	17.77%
UPF	15.66%

=== By constituency ===
Constituency	Electorate	Party	Candidate	Votes	%
Alexandra	17,367	People's Action Party	Tan Soo Khoon	12,413	75.90
Alexandra	17,367	Workers' Party	Edward Chua	3,941	24.10
Aljunied	17,461	People's Action Party	Chin Harn Tong	12,230	74.88
Aljunied	17,461	Workers' Party	Lim Kang Chew	4,103	25.12
Ang Mo Kio	14,264	People's Action Party	Yeo Toon Chia	Uncontested	
Anson	12,755	People's Action Party	P. Govindaswamy	Uncontested	
Bedok	11,310	People's Action Party	Sha'ari Tadin	7,928	73.78
Bedok	11,310	People's Front	Sim Peng Kim	2,818	26.22
Boon Lay	15,496	People's Action Party	Ngeow Pack Hua	11,749	79.82
Boon Lay	15,496	Singapore Justice Party	V. Joseph	2,970	20.18
Boon Teck	18,872	People's Action Party	Phey Yew Kok	12,698	71.92
Boon Teck	18,872	Barisan Sosialis	Ng Seng Chua	4,958	28.08
Braddell Heights	14,031	People's Action Party	Lee Khoon Choy	Uncontested	
Brickworks	14,062	People's Action Party	Ahmad Mattar	9,871	73.99
Brickworks	14,062	United Front	Tung Tao-Chang	3,470	26.01
Bukit Batok	15,650	People's Action Party	Chai Chong Yii	12,216	84.57
Bukit Batok	15,650	Singapore Justice Party	Sulaiman Jaffar	2,229	15.43
Bukit Ho Swee	13,686	People's Action Party	Seah Mui Kok	9,451	73.50
Bukit Ho Swee	13,686	United Front	Hwang Ban Cheong	3,407	26.50
Bukit Merah	17,538	People's Action Party	Lim Guan Hoo	12,775	76.37
Bukit Merah	17,538	United Front	Wong Kui Yu	3,952	23.63
Bukit Panjang	18,906	People's Action Party	Lee Yiok Seng	11,867	67.43
Bukit Panjang	18,906	Workers' Party	Ho Juan Thai	5,731	32.57
Bukit Timah	13,132	People's Action Party	Chor Yeok Eng	Uncontested	
Buona Vista	16,267	People's Action Party	Ang Kok Peng	12,704	82.75
Buona Vista	16,267	United People's Front	Hashim Mukayat	2,649	17.25
Cairnhill	13,419	People's Action Party	Lim Kim San	7,979	68.17
Cairnhill	13,419	Independent	Chiam See Tong	3,726	31.83
Changi	17,827	People's Action Party	Teo Chong Tee	12,038	72.63
Changi	17,827	Workers' Party	Zainal Abiden Mohd Ali	4,537	27.37
Chua Chu Kang	18,136	People's Action Party	Tang See Chim	11,740	68.75
Chua Chu Kang	18,136	Workers' Party	Chan Keng Sieng	5,336	31.25
Delta	14,821	People's Action Party	Yeo Choo Kok	10,636	76.40
Delta	14,821	United Front	Ng Ho	3,286	23.60
Farrer Park	11,949	People's Action Party	Lee Chiaw Meng	Uncontested	
Geylang East	14,738	People's Action Party	Ho Cheng Choon	9,405	68.49
Geylang East	14,738	Workers' Party	Kum Teng Hock	4,326	31.51
Geylang Serai	14,178	People's Action Party	Rahmat Kenap	8,780	66.34
Geylang Serai	14,178	Pertubuhan Kebangsaan Melayu Singapura	Amnah Kuong Hussein	3,129	23.64
Geylang Serai	14,178	United People's Front	Darus Shariff	1,326	10.02
Geylang West	18,101	People's Action Party	Yong Nyuk Lin	11,912	71.18
Geylang West	18,101	United Front	Lim Tiong Hock	4,822	28.82
Havelock	12,492	People's Action Party	Hon Sui Sen	9,250	79.29
Havelock	12,492	Workers' Party	Ngoei Soon On	2,416	20.71
Henderson	18,182	People's Action Party	Lai Tha Chai	12,857	74.77
Henderson	18,182	Workers' Party	Hoe Boon Teck	4,338	25.23
Jalan Besar	14,933	People's Action Party	Chan Chee Seng	Uncontested	
Jalan Kayu	15,447	People's Action Party	Hwang Soo Jin	8,883	61.57
Jalan Kayu	15,447	Workers' Party	M. P. D. Nair	5,544	38.43
Joo Chiat	14,241	People's Action Party	Yeoh Ghim Seng	9,601	74.73
Joo Chiat	14,241	Workers' Party	M. Ameer Batcha	3,247	25.27
Jurong	18,310	People's Action Party	Ho Kah Leong	Uncontested	
Kallang	17,282	People's Action Party	S. Dhanabalan	11,823	73.90
Kallang	17,282	United Front	Chan Yoke Kwong	4,175	26.10
Kampong Chai Chee	19,126	People's Action Party	Fong Sip Chee	10,729	59.92
Kampong Chai Chee	19,126	Workers' Party	J. B. Jeyaratnam	7,177	40.08
Kampong Glam	18,439	People's Action Party	S. Rajaratnam	13,114	80.18
Kampong Glam	18,439	United People's Front	Ang Bee Lian	3,241	19.82
Kampong Kembangan	13,720	People's Action Party	Mansor Sukaimi	8,028	64.02
Kampong Kembangan	13,720	Workers' Party	R. Murugason	4,511	35.98
Kampong Ubi	20,811	People's Action Party	Ya'acob Mohamed	13,241	68.46
Kampong Ubi	20,811	Pertubuhan Kebangsaan Melayu Singapura	Sahid Sahooman	6,101	31.54
Katong	15,861	People's Action Party	Joseph Francis Conceicao	10,721	76.18
Katong	15,861	United Front	William Cook	3,353	23.82
Khe Bong	15,677	People's Action Party	Ho See Beng	10,950	74.33
Khe Bong	15,677	Barisan Sosialis	Sim Say Chuan	3,782	25.67
Kim Keat	19,700	People's Action Party	Ong Teng Cheong	14,262	76.62
Kim Keat	19,700	Barisan Sosialis	Chin Tian Choo	4,353	23.38
Kim Seng	14,860	People's Action Party	Ong Leong Boon	10,975	77.65
Kim Seng	14,860	Workers' Party	Chiang Seok Keong	3,159	22.35
Kolam Ayer	19,371	People's Action Party	Sidek Saniff	13,175	72.46
Kolam Ayer	19,371	United Front	R. Chetty	5,007	27.54
Kreta Ayer	12,199	People's Action Party	Goh Keng Swee	Uncontested	
Kuo Chuan	16,990	People's Action Party	P. Selvadurai	11,931	74.42
Kuo Chuan	16,990	Barisan Sosialis	Ng Ah Chue	4,100	25.58
Leng Kee	18,475	People's Action Party	Ow Chin Hock	13,356	76.76
Leng Kee	18,475	United Front	Ng Lep Chong	4,043	23.24
MacPherson	18,716	People's Action Party	Chua Sian Chin	Uncontested	
Marine Parade	19,528	People's Action Party	Goh Chok Tong	14,418	78.62
Marine Parade	19,528	United Front	Monsor Rahman	3,922	21.38
Moulmein	12,654	People's Action Party	Lawrence Sia	8,571	72.73
Moulmein	12,654	Workers' Party	A. Balakrishnan	2,766	23.47
Moulmein	12,654	Independent	Lee Nai Choo	447	3.80
Mountbatten	15,440	People's Action Party	Ng Yeow Chong	9,412	65.86
Mountbatten	15,440	United Front	Seow Khee Leng	4,878	34.14
Nee Soon	16,143	People's Action Party	Ong Soo Chuan	Uncontested	
Pasir Panjang	12,142	People's Action Party	Othman Wok	8,138	71.93
Pasir Panjang	12,142	Workers' Party	Zainal Abiddin Mohd Shah	3,176	28.07
Paya Lebar	15,648	People's Action Party	Tan Cheng San	9,764	67.52
Paya Lebar	15,648	Workers' Party	Wong Hong Toy	4,697	32.48
Potong Pasir	14,167	People's Action Party	Ivan Cuthbert Baptist	9,667	74.83
Potong Pasir	14,167	Workers' Party	Quek Doh Lam	3,252	25.17
Punggol	20,444	People's Action Party	Ng Kah Ting	13,360	69.41
Punggol	20,444	Workers' Party	Tan Yong Sin	5,887	30.59
Queenstown	16,926	People's Action Party	Jek Yeun Thong	Uncontested	
Radin Mas	18,418	People's Action Party	N. Govindasamy	13,246	75.65
Radin Mas	18,418	Workers' Party	Othman Abdullah	4,263	24.35
River Valley	17,022	People's Action Party	Tan Eng Liang	12,256	81.82
River Valley	17,022	Workers' Party	Wu Kher	2,724	18.18
Rochore	15,424	People's Action Party	Toh Chin Chye	9,053	65.50
Rochore	15,424	Barisan Sosialis	Lee Siew Choh	4,768	34.50
Sembawang	17,695	People's Action Party	Teong Eng Siong	13,661	83.57
Sembawang	17,695	United People's Front	Santhi Thevar	2,685	16.43
Serangoon Gardens	12,115	People's Action Party	Lau Teik Soon	7,471	68.74
Serangoon Gardens	12,115	Workers' Party	C. H. Crabb	3,397	31.26
Siglap	13,849	People's Action Party	Abdul Rahim Ishak	9,733	78.20
Siglap	13,849	United Front	Weerappulli K. W. B.	2,714	21.80
Tampines	15,559	People's Action Party	Phua Bah Lee	Uncontested	
Tanglin	13,332	People's Action Party	E. W. Barker	Uncontested	
Tanjong Pagar	12,147	People's Action Party	Lee Kuan Yew	9,996	89.03
Tanjong Pagar	12,147	United People's Front	Harbans Singh	1,232	10.97
Telok Ayer	15,515	People's Action Party	Ong Pang Boon	Uncontested	
Telok Blangah	14,225	People's Action Party	Ahmad Haleem	Uncontested	
Thomson	15,609	People's Action Party	Ang Nam Piau	10,636	74.12
Thomson	15,609	United Front	Chung Kit Wong	3,714	25.88
Tiong Bahru	19,589	People's Action Party	Ch'ng Jit Koon	15,248	83.10
Tiong Bahru	19,589	United People's Front	Teo Kim Hoe	3,100	16.90
Toa Payoh	13,933	People's Action Party	Eric Cheong	9,633	73.63
Toa Payoh	13,933	Barisan Sosialis	Abdul Rahim	3,450	26.37
Ulu Pandan	16,343	People's Action Party	Chiang Hai Ding	Uncontested	
Upper Serangoon	13,705	People's Action Party	Sia Kah Hui	9,982	79.15
Upper Serangoon	13,705	United Front	Ng Kwee Lim	2,630	20.85
Whampoa	19,259	People's Action Party	Augustine Tan	14,636	80.98
Whampoa	19,259	Workers' Party	Mohamed Shariff Yahya	3,438	19.02
Source: ELD
