= Mountbatten Single Member Constituency (1959 – 1991) =

Constituency in Singapore

Coordinates: 1.306°N 103.882°E

Mountbatten
- Former single-member constituency for the Parliament of Singapore
- Region: Central Region, Singapore
- Electorate: 15,497

Former constituency
- Created: 1957; 69 years ago
- Abolished: 1991; 35 years ago
- Seats: 1
- Party: People's Action Party
- Member: Eugene Yap Giau Cheng
- Merged to: Marine Parade GRC (1997)

The Mountbatten Single Member Constituency (Note: Malay: Kawasan Undi Perseorangan Mountbatten; Chinese: 蒙巴登单选区; Tamil: மவுண்ட்பேட்டன் தனித்தொகுதி) was a single-member constituency (SMC) situated in central Singapore. It was established in 1959 and was merged into Marine Parade Group Representation Constituency (GRC) in 1991. The last Member of Parliament (MP) for the constituency was Eugene Yap Giau Cheng from the People's Action Party (PAP).

== History ==
Mountbatten Constituency was established in 1957; it was first contested at the 1959 general election and won by Seow Peck Leng from the Singapore People's Alliance (SPA). It was one of the few constituencies not won by the PAP, which secured 43 out of 51 seats in that general election. The PAP gained control of the constituency in the 1963 general election through the election of Ng Yeow Chong. He served as the Member of Parliament until his retirement at the 1980 general election, after which he was succeeded by Eugene Yap.

At the 1988 general election, with the introduction of GRCs, the constituency was renamed Mountbatten SMC.

Yap represented Mountbatten until the constituency was abolished in the 1997 general election and merged into Marine Parade GRC as a division.

== Member of Parliament ==
Year	Member	Party
Formation
Legislative Assembly of Singapore
1959	Seow Peck Leng	SPA
1963	Ng Yeow Chong	PAP
Parliament of Singapore
1968	Ng Yeow Chong	PAP
1972	Ng Yeow Chong	PAP
1976	Ng Yeow Chong	PAP
1980	Eugene Yap Giau Cheng	PAP
1984	Eugene Yap Giau Cheng	PAP
1988	Eugene Yap Giau Cheng	PAP
1991	Eugene Yap Giau Cheng	PAP
Constituency abolished (1997)

== Electoral results ==
Note: The Elections Department does not include rejected votes when calculating the vote shares of candidates. Hence, all candidates' vote shares will total to 100% at any given election (may not appear so in multi-way contests due to rounding).

=== Elections in 1950s ===
General Election 1959
Party	Candidate	Votes	%
SPA	Seow Peck Leng	3,031	33.71
PAP	Tay Kim Sun	2,143	23.84
MCA	Wong Foo Nam	1,903	21.17
KURA	Felice Leon-Soh	1,354	15.06
LSP	Wee Soo Bee	559	6.22
Majority		888	9.87
Total valid votes		8,990	99.28
Rejected ballots		65	0.72
Turnout		9,055	88.67
Registered electors		10,212	
SPA win (new seat)			

=== Elections in 1960s ===
General Election 1963
Party	Candidate	Votes	%	±%
PAP	Ng Yeow Chong	7,751	48.97	▲25.13
BS	Fung Yin Ching	5,158	32.59	N/A
SA	Lee Kim Chuan	1,865	11.78	▼21.93
Independent	Felice Leon-Soh	1,053	6.66	▼8.40
Majority		2,593	16.38	▲6.51
Total valid votes		15,827	99.11	▼0.17
Rejected ballots		142	0.89	▲0.17
Turnout		15,969	94.81	▲6.14
Registered electors		16,843		▲64.93
PAP gain from SPA		Swing	▲25.13	

Notes: the incumbent Singapore People's Alliance (SPA) had joined the UMNO-MCA-MIC alliance to form the Singapore Alliance Party (SA) in this election.

General Election 1968
Party	Candidate	Votes	%	±%
PAP	Ng Yeow Chong	Unopposed		
Registered electors		12,760		▼24.24
PAP hold				

=== Elections in 1970s ===
General Election 1972
Party	Candidate	Votes	%	±%
PAP	Ng Yeow Chong	Unopposed		
Registered electors		14,396		▲12.82
PAP hold				

General Election 1976
Party	Candidate	Votes	%	±%
PAP	Ng Yeow Chong	9,412	65.86	N/A
UF	Seow Khee Leng	4,878	34.14	N/A
Majority		4,534	31.72	N/A
Total valid votes		14,290	97.16	N/A
Rejected ballots		417	2.84	N/A
Turnout		14,707	95.25	N/A
Registered electors		15,440		▲7.25
PAP hold				

=== Elections in 1980s ===
General Election 1980
Party	Candidate	Votes	%	±%
PAP	Eugene Yap Giau Cheng	Unopposed		
Registered electors		14,045		▼9.03
PAP hold				

General Election 1984
Party	Candidate	Votes	%	±%
PAP	Eugene Yap Giau Cheng	16,077	81.32	N/A
Independent	Tan Ah Teng	3,692	18.68	N/A
Majority		12,385	62.64	N/A
Total valid votes		19,769	96.41	N/A
Rejected ballots		736	3.59	N/A
Turnout		20,505	95.46	N/A
Registered electors		21,480		▲52.94
PAP hold		Swing	N/A	

General Election 1988
Party	Candidate	Votes	%	±%
PAP	Eugene Yap Giau Cheng	12,712	78.15	▼3.17
Independent	Chiam Pan Boon	3,554	21.85	▲3.17
Majority		9,158	56.30	▼6.34
Total valid votes		16,266	96.20	▼0.21
Rejected ballots		643	3.80	▲0.21
Turnout		16,909	95.28	▼0.18
Registered electors		17,747		▼17.38
PAP hold		Swing	▼3.17	

=== Elections in 1990s ===
General Election 1991
Party	Candidate	Votes	%	±%
PAP	Eugene Yap Giau Cheng	11,029	77.95	▼0.20
Independent	Yen Kim Khooi	3,119	22.05	▲0.20
Majority		7,910	55.90	▼0.40
Total valid votes		14,148	95.98	▼0.22
Rejected ballots		593	4.02	▲0.22
Turnout		14,741	95.12	▼0.16
Registered electors		15,497		▼12.68
PAP hold		Swing	▼0.2	
