= Sahorah Ahmat =

Singaporean politician

Sahorah binte Ahmat was the first Malay assemblywoman in Singapore. Initially a member of the Singapore branch of the United Malays National Organisation (UMNO) and the head of its women's wing, she defected to the People's Action Party (PAP) in 1957 and was elected a member of the Legislative Assembly of Singapore representing the Siglap Single Member Constituency in the 1959 Singaporean general election. An ill and bedridden Sahorah provided the final vote for Lee Kuan Yew when he threatened to step down as prime minister should he lose a vote of confidence, allowing him to secure a slight majority and thus resulting in him remaining in power. She remained the only Malay woman to have been elected into Singapore parliament until Halimah Yacob was elected a Member of Parliament in 2001.

== Early life and education ==
Sahorah was born in Selangor in the mid-1930s and studied at the Rahang Malay School there. She later came to Singapore, where she studied at the Princess Elizabeth Evening School.

== Career ==
Sahorah was a social worker. She was initially a member of the United Malays National Organisation's Singapore branch and the leader of its women's wing. However, in 1957, she was among several members of the Singapore branch who defected to the People's Action Party, an event which "bolstered the PAP's outreach to the Malay electorate and helped soften its image of being a "Chinese Party"." Sahorah had been the vice-chairman of the party's west division's women's section and a member of the division's executive committee at the time. According to publicity chief Darus Shariff, she had resigned over disagreements regarding the party policy. Sahorah was selected to be the party's candidate for the Siglap Single Member Constituency in the 1959 Singaporean general election, in which the party was the only one to contest all 51 seats of the Legislative Assembly. The seat was "one of the most hotly contested seats in Singapore's electoral history" and her opponents included "political heavyweight" Inche Sidik of the UMNO. One of nine female candidates in the election, Sahorah gave a speech stating: "Singapore women are backward compared to women in other countries. We want to do our best." Fellow candidate John Snodgrass of the Liberal Socialist Party unsuccessfully attempted to disqualify her from the election due to a spelling error on her nomination papers.

Sahorah was elected a member of the Legislative Assembly representing Siglap with 34% of the total votes in first-past-the-post voting. She was one of four women from the PAP to have won the election, along with Hoe Puay Choo, Chan Choy Siong and Fung Yin Ching, and one of five women to have been elected overall, with the fifth being Seow Peck Leng of the Singapore People's Alliance. She and Lee Siew Choh were placed in the Ministry of Health, with Sahorah serving as a public liaison. She was later made a member of the committee overseeing homes run by the Social Welfare Department. Sahorah took over the public complaints bureau of the Ministry of Health on 23 June 1959 as parliamentary secretary Sheng Nam Chin had fallen ill. In 1960, she "took up arms against easy divorce by proposing a bill to solve the problem of maintenance for divorced Muslim women." In September 1961, she invited then-Parliamentary Secretary for the Ministry of National Development Ya'acob Mohamed to inspect the living conditions of villagers in Siglap. As a result, the ministry announced soon after that two villages in the area, Kampong Siglap and the kampong at Jalan Sempadan, were to receive access to electricity. In November 1961, she was a member of the three-member delegation, along with fellow politicians and women's rights activists Oh Su Chen and Ong Pang Boon, who submitted a memorandum to then-Minister for Finance Goh Keng Swee advocating for abolishing the gender pay gap for civil servants and for women to enjoy working conditions equal to those enjoyed by men. In March 1962, they received assurance that their demands were to be met.

Prime Minister Lee Kuan Yew, facing heavy criticism from the opposition, started a vote of confidence which would result in his resignation should he fail to secure a majority. Fellow Member of Parliament Chan Chee Seng allegedly came to Sahorah while she was ill and bedridden, resting in the hospital, asking her to vote for Lee. He was successful and she was transported to the Legislative Assembly in an ambulance and taken into the chamber on a stretcher. Her vote secured a majority for Lee. Sahorah claimed to have been reluctant to support Lee as she had been "ostracised" by her colleagues at government functions and that she was "disliked" by them. She later claimed to have changed her mind as she "liked" Chan. In his autobiography, Lee described her as a "large, overweight lady of 36, a good platform speaker in Malay, simple and straightforward." The event was "seen as one of the most dramatic junctures in Singapore's recent history." The PAP members who refused to support Lee in the vote later split from the party to form the Barisan Sosialis.

In November 1961, when the Barisan Sosialis claimed that the People's Action Party had lost the support of the people during a debate, she stated that "they must go out and face the people to prove that they got support from the people, otherwise they have no business to say that it is the rights of the people." By then, the PAP only had a slight majority in parliament. Despite being in poor health, she was once required to attend a voting session in socks, gloves and a yellow sweater to pass bills. Sahorah, a vocal proponent of Singapore being within Malaysia, openly criticised the Barisan Sosialis, believing that their proposition for Singapore to gain independence before merging with Malaysia "revealed that the Barisan were indeed in the pockets of the Communists." In February 1962 firecrackers used as part of local Chinese New Year celebrations caused a fire in Siglap which destroyed the homes of around 500 people. Sahorah aided in the distribution of emergency cash provided to the victims from the government and chaired the Kampong Siglap Relief Aid Committee. She went around the wealthier neighbourhoods of Siglap collecting donations for the victims and petitioned for the local community centre to be used as a temporary shelter for those affected by the fire. Sahorah also organised "Siglap Night", a variety concert, to raise funds. The event featured two popular Malay film actresses, Marsita and Maria Menado. In June 1963, Sahorah opened the Dunearn Secondary Vocational School. Sahorah did not stand for re-election in the 1963 Singaporean general election on account of her ill health and was succeeded by Abdul Rahim Ishak. In April 1964, she appeared at a rally for Lau Kit Sun, the PAP candidate for Seremban Timor in the 1964 Malaysian general election, "urging the people not to vote for any party that was sympathetic to Indonesia."

== Later life and legacy ==
Sahorah's whereabouts in her later years are not known. Chan stated in 2001 that he had heard that she had left for Malaysia to live with her sister. It is believed that she settled there until her death. In 1991, the Beritah Harian mistakenly reported 1962 as the year of her death, an incident which Muhammad Suhail Mohd Yazid of the ISEAS - Yusof Ishak Institute attributed to her "faded presence in public memory." He notes that while she is "often remembered for her crucial role in giving the PAP government that single vote of confidence to save it from collapse", she "has often been confined to that moment" and little is known of her overall. Yazid writes that Sahorah "managed to transcend expectations and establish her legacy."

Sahorah remained the only Malay woman to have been elected into Singapore parliament until Halimah Yacob was elected a Member of Parliament in 2001. Another Malay woman, Fatimah Noor binte Golam Shawal of the Malay Union, stood as a candidate in 1959. Norma Yahya of the Workers' Party also stood as a candidate for the Changi Single Member Constituency in the 1972 Singaporean general election.
