= Citizens Party =

Citizens Party or Citizens' Party may refer to:

- Citizens (Spanish political party)
- Citizens' Party (Denmark)
- Citizens Party (Hong Kong)
- Citizens' Party (Iceland, 1987)
- Citizens' Party (Finland)
- Citizens Party, a short-lived party label used in 1888 in Milwaukee (see Thomas H. Brown)
- Citizens' Party (Singapore)
- Citizens Party (United States), a short lived political party organized by Barry Commoner in 1979 and predecessor of the Green Party
- Citizens Party of the United States, founded in 2010
- Nationalist Citizens' Party of the Philippines
- White Citizens Parties, local Jim Crow era parties in the Southern United States
- Australian Citizens Party
