= Leader of the Opposition (Singapore) =

Parliamentary position in the Parliament of Singapore

Leader of the Opposition of Singapore
- Coat of arms of Singapore

- Flag of Singapore
- Incumbent; Vacant since 15 January 2026
- Parliament of Singapore
- Style: Leader of the Opposition (informal); The Honourable (formal)
- Abbreviation: LO
- Appointer: Prime Minister of Singapore
- Term length: 5 years, renewable
- Inaugural holder: Lee Kuan Yew (de facto); Pritam Singh (de jure)
- Formation: 22 April 1955; 71 years ago (de facto); 24 August 2020; 6 years ago (de jure)
- Salary: S$518,000 annually (inclusive of S$259,500 MP allowance)

The leader of the opposition (Note: Malay: Ketua Pembangkang Republik Singapura, Chinese: 新加坡国会反对党领袖; pinyin: Xīnjiāpō Guóhuì Fǎnduìdǎng Lǐngxiù, Tamil: சிங்கப்பூர் எதிர்க்கட்சித் தலைவர், romanized: Ciṅkappūr Etirkkaṭcit Talaivar) of Singapore is a position in the Parliament of Singapore referring to a politician who leads the largest opposition party in the country, typically the leader of a party that possesses the most seats in Parliament that is not the governing party or part of a governing coalition.

Although the position has de facto existed since 1955, it was formally established (but still without statutory designation) by the government in 2020, with Pritam Singh of the Workers' Party (WP) serving from 24 August 2020 until his removal by Prime Minister Lawrence Wong of the People's Action Party (PAP) on 15 January 2026.

The position has since remained vacant de jure after the WP declined to nominate a replacement. The party stated that Singh was still the leader of the opposition because the head of the largest opposition party in Parliament inherently holds that role. The Prime Minister's Office subsequently accepted this decision.

== History ==
=== Unofficial era (1955–2020) ===
The Leader of the Opposition was previously an unofficial de facto position in the Parliament of Singapore, as the Constitution and standing orders of Parliament did not make provision for such an office. Those who performed the role did so without any formal recognition or additional parliamentary privileges. As a result, the Leader of the Opposition did not receive any remuneration beyond the ordinary allowance provided to other regular Members of Parliament. In practice, the position followed Westminster convention, where the leader of the largest non-government party would act as the opposition leader in Parliament, without requiring formal appointment.

=== As a formal office (2020–present) ===
The formal office of the Leader of the Opposition was established following the 2020 general election, in which the Workers' Party (WP) won 10 seats in Parliament. Prime Minister Lee Hsien Loong announced that a formal office would be created, and that the Leader of the Opposition would be provided with the necessary manpower support and resources to carry out the role effectively. Pritam Singh, as the Secretary-General of the Workers' Party, was formally designated as the Leader of the Opposition in 2020.

At the time, the Leader of the Opposition drew an initial annual salary of S$385,000, double the salary of a regular MP. As is the case in other Commonwealth countries operating under a Westminster parliamentary system of government, the appointment in Singapore is supported by a secretariat and includes access to office facilities within the Parliament buildings. The role carries with it clearly defined duties and institutional support, marking a shift from its previous informal status to a formal and recognised component of Singapore's parliamentary structure. With the latest revision of the salaries on 8 September 2026, the annual salary was increased to $518,000, as the salary annum for a MP was increased to $259,000.

==== Reception ====
Unlike in some other Westminster-derived parliaments, where the Leader of the Opposition is conventionally the leader of the largest non-government party, the Singapore arrangement differs in both form and basis. In the United Kingdom, the Leader of the Opposition leads the opposition in the House of Commons; in Australia, the officeholder leads the opposition in the Australian House of Representatives. In these systems, the position arises from electoral outcomes and party leadership, rather than executive designation.

By contrast, the Leader of the Opposition in Singapore is formally designated by the Prime Minister. This marks a departure from the earlier de facto practice in Singapore, which had followed Westminster convention without formal appointment, and means that the office does not automatically accrue to the leader of the largest opposition party. Observers have noted that this represents a departure from traditional Westminster practice, giving the head of government a formal role in determining who leads the opposition within Parliament.

Opposition parties have publicly criticised this arrangement. In a media statement issued in January 2026, the WP stated that, in Westminster systems, the position is conventionally extended to the leader of the largest opposition party or determined by the opposition itself. It further argued that the position arises from electoral success at the ballot box, and that in other Westminster systems the office is established by law rather than being the prerogative of the government of the day, expressing what it described as the authority and sanctity of the people's vote.

Similar concerns were raised by the Progress Singapore Party (PSP). The party stated that the office remains a position in the gift of the Prime Minister, and that it has not been institutionalised within the Standing Orders of Parliament or the Constitution. The PSP argued that this was inconsistent with conventions in other Westminster parliaments, and that the Leader of the Opposition should instead be chosen by opposition MPs, with eligibility conditions determined by Parliament rather than the executive.

Commentators have also suggested that, in a Parliament dominated by a single supermajority, the discretionary nature of the appointment opens the office to political manoeuvring. In January 2026, following the removal of Pritam Singh from the position by Prime Minister Lawrence Wong of the governing PAP, political analyst Felix Tan observed that the WP could choose to leave the office vacant, characterising such a move as signalling that the party continued to value both the role and Singh, while framing the removal as "a clear demonstration of partisan politics". WP chairperson Sylvia Lim similarly described the episode as a "party political exercise".

After deliberation, the WP rejected the invitation to nominate a replacement, stating that the leader of the largest opposition party in Parliament was, by convention, the leader of the opposition. The Prime Minister's Office (PMO) subsequently announced that the position would remain vacant until the party was "prepared" to nominate a candidate.

== Overview ==
=== Duties ===
The Leader of the Opposition is expected to lead the opposition in presenting alternative views during parliamentary debates on policies, bills and motions. The role includes overseeing and coordinating the scrutiny of the Government’s positions and actions in Parliament, as well as being consulted on the appointment of opposition members to various Select Committees, including Standing Select Committees such as the Public Accounts Committee.

In addition to parliamentary responsibilities, the Leader of the Opposition may be called upon to carry out other official duties. These can include attending state functions, as well as participating in visits and meetings alongside members of the Government and the Public Service.

The appointment is accompanied by additional parliamentary privileges and responsibilities, recognising the importance of the role within Singapore’s parliamentary system. The Leader of the Opposition serves as the principal spokesperson for the opposition and plays a central part in ensuring that Government actions are subject to robust and organised oversight.

=== Powers and resources ===
In Parliament, the Leader of the Opposition is generally accorded the right of first response among Members of Parliament and is permitted to pose the lead question to ministers during debates on policies, bills and motions, in accordance with established speaking conventions. The Leader is also granted a longer speaking time for speeches, equal to that of political officeholders.

Beyond access to government data available to all MPs, the Leader of the Opposition is provided with confidential briefings by the Government on specific matters concerning national security and external relations. These briefings may also be extended in times of national crisis or emergency.

The Leader of the Opposition is allocated an office and a meeting room within Parliament House. They are entitled to additional staffing support, with allowances provided for up to three legislative assistants, on top of the standard provision for one legislative assistant and one secretarial assistant granted to all MPs. A dedicated secretary is also assigned to assist with administrative and parliamentary matters.

During a parliamentary debate in January 2026, Singh stated that some of the supposed additional entitlements associated with the office, including access to classified briefings and overseas trips with the government, had not materialised in practice during his time as the leader of the opposition.

== List of officeholders ==
Political parties

People's Action Party (PAP)
Barisan Sosialis (BS)
Singapore People's Alliance (SPA)
Workers' Party (WP)
Singapore Democratic Party (SDP)
Singapore People's Party (SPP)

=== De facto ===
No.	Portrait	Name Constituency (Birth–Death)	Term of office			Election	Party
No.	Portrait	Name Constituency (Birth–Death)	Took office	Left office	Time in office	Election	Party
1	Lee Kuan Yew in 1965	Lee Kuan Yew; MP for Tanjong Pagar (1923–2015)	22 April 1955	31 March 1959	3 years, 343 days	1955	PAP
2		Lim Yew Hock; MP for Cairnhill (1914–1984)	1 July 1959	3 September 1963	4 years, 64 days	1959	SPA
3		Lim Huan Boon; MP for Bukit Merah (born 1929)	22 October 1963	31 December 1965	2 years, 70 days	1963	BS
4		Chia Thye Poh; MP for Jurong (born 1941)	1 January 1966	7 October 1966	279 days	—	BS
None (Note: From 1966 until 1981, the People's Action Party held all the seats in the Parliament of Singapore.) (7 October 1966–22 December 1981)
5		J. B. Jeyaretnam; MP for Anson (1926–2008)	22 December 1981	10 November 1986	4 years, 323 days	—	WP
5		J. B. Jeyaretnam; MP for Anson (1926–2008)	22 December 1981	10 November 1986	4 years, 323 days	1984	WP
6		Chiam See Tong; MP for Potong Pasir SMC (born 1935)	10 November 1986	6 August 1993	6 years, 269 days	—	SDP
6		Chiam See Tong; MP for Potong Pasir SMC (born 1935)	10 November 1986	6 August 1993	6 years, 269 days	1988	SDP
6		Chiam See Tong; MP for Potong Pasir SMC (born 1935)	10 November 1986	6 August 1993	6 years, 269 days	1991	SDP
7		Ling How Doong; MP for Bukit Gombak SMC (1934–2021)	6 August 1993	16 December 1996	3 years, 132 days	—	SDP
(6)		Chiam See Tong; MP for Potong Pasir SMC (born 1935)	26 May 1997	20 April 2006	8 years, 329 days	1997	SPP (until 2001)
(6)		Chiam See Tong; MP for Potong Pasir SMC (born 1935)	26 May 1997	20 April 2006	8 years, 329 days	2001	SDA (from 2001)
8		Low Thia Khiang; MP for Hougang SMC (until 2011) and Aljunied GRC (from 2011) (born 1956)	2 November 2006	8 April 2018	11 years, 157 days	2006	WP
8		Low Thia Khiang; MP for Hougang SMC (until 2011) and Aljunied GRC (from 2011) (born 1956)	2 November 2006	8 April 2018	11 years, 157 days	2011	WP
8		Low Thia Khiang; MP for Hougang SMC (until 2011) and Aljunied GRC (from 2011) (born 1956)	2 November 2006	8 April 2018	11 years, 157 days	2015	WP
9		Pritam Singh; MP for Aljunied GRC (born 1976)	8 April 2018	24 August 2020	2 years, 138 days	—	WP
(9)		Pritam Singh; MP for Aljunied GRC (born 1976)	15 January 2026	Incumbent	307 days	—	WP

=== De jure ===
No.	Portrait	Name Constituency (Birth–Death)	Term of office			Election	Party
No.	Portrait	Name Constituency (Birth–Death)	Took office	Left office	Time in office	Election	Party
1		Pritam Singh; MP for Aljunied GRC (born 1976)	24 August 2020	15 January 2026	5 years, 144 days	2020	WP
1		Pritam Singh; MP for Aljunied GRC (born 1976)	24 August 2020	15 January 2026	5 years, 144 days	2025	WP
Vacant (since 15 January 2026)

== See also ==
- Prime Minister of Singapore
- Leader of the Opposition
- List of Singapore opposition party MPs elected
