= 1959 Singaporean general election =

- 30 May 1959

All 51 seats in the Legislative Assembly 26 seats needed for a majority
- Registered: 586,098
- Turnout: 90.07% (▲37.41pp)
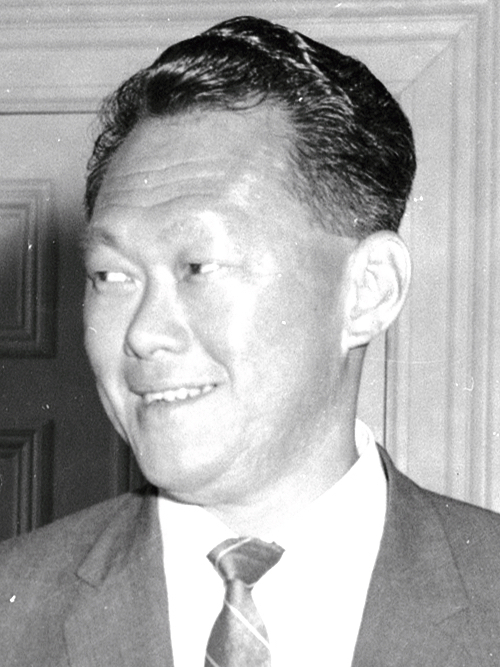

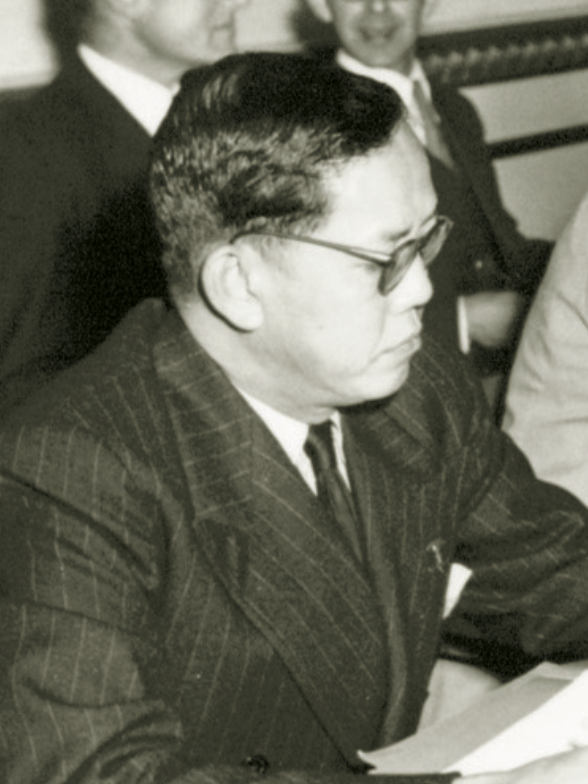

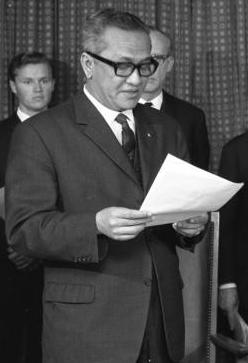
	First party	Second party	Third party
Leader	Lee Kuan Yew	Lim Yew Hock	Abdul Hamid Jumat
Party	PAP	SPA	UMNO
Leader's seat	Tanjong Pagar	Cairnhill (Note: Lim Yew Hock represented Havelock before the election.)	Geylang Serai (Note: Abdul Hamid Jumat represented Ulu Bedok before the election.)
Last election	8.72%, 3 seats	Did not exist	3.66%, 1 seat
Seats won	43	4	3
Seat change	▲39	New	▲2
Popular vote	281,891	107,755	27,448
Percentage	54.08%	20.67%	5.27%
Swing	▲45.36pp	New	▲1.61pp
- Results by constituency
Chief Minister before election
Lim Yew Hock
SPA
Prime Minister after election
Lee Kuan Yew
PAP

General elections were held in Singapore on 30 May 1959 to elect all 51 members of the Legislative Assembly. They were the first general elections after Singapore was granted full internal self-government from the United Kingdom, excluding matters of defence and foreign affairs. Prior to the elections, the constitution was revised, known as the Singapore (Constitution) Order in Council 1958. Along with a wholly elected Legislative Assembly, it also created the position of the Yang di-Pertuan Negara as head of state and a Prime Minister as head of government. It was also the first general election with universal suffrage and compulsory voting, leading to a voter turnout of 90.07%, a significant increase from 52.66% in 1955.

The People's Action Party (PAP), led by Lee Kuan Yew, achieved a landslide victory by winning 43 of the 51 seats and securing 54.08% of the popular vote. The PAP, which benefited from the support of trade unions and Chinese-speaking working-class voters, had focused on completely ending colonial rule, expanding public housing and education, creating jobs through industrialisation and fostering racial harmony as its platform. Its main opponent, Lim Yew Hock's Singapore People's Alliance (SPA), which had some former members of the Labour Front (LF), secured only four seats. The Singaporean branch of the United Malays National Organisation (UMNO) won three seats, while other parties and independents made little headway.

Following the elections, Lee was sworn in as Singapore's first Prime Minister on 5 June 1959, heading the first fully elected government under the new constitutional framework. The PAP's decisive victory marked the beginning of a prolonged period of political dominance that has continued into the present day. The 1959 general elections are also widely recognised by scholars and historians as a pivotal moment in Singapore's modern history, marking a crucial step towards full sovereignty in 1965.

== Background ==
=== Political developments ===
David Marshall, who led the ruling Labour Front (LF) following its victory in the previous general election in 1955, was a staunch anti-colonialist and vocal critic of British rule. As Chief Minister, Marshall advocated for immediate self-government, but his uncompromising stance and confrontational negotiations with the British made it difficult to reach a mutually acceptable agreement. In 1956, after failing to secure British assent for full internal self-rule, Marshall resigned, having pledged to do so upon failure. He was succeeded by Lim Yew Hock, who adopted a more pragmatic and conciliatory approach toward the colonial authorities while simultaneously launching an aggressive campaign against left-wing and communist-linked groups. Lim's crackdown succeeded in convincing the British that the local leadership could manage internal security, which paved the way for a concrete plan toward self-governance.

However, by the time of the 1959 election, the LF was deeply divided and politically weakened. Lim's repressive anti-communist measures, while effective in satisfying British concerns, had alienated a substantial portion of the ethnic Chinese electorate which had been disproportionately targeted during the anti-communist drive. His administration was accused of violating civil liberties, with numerous activists and trade unionists detained without trial with the justification of internal security. The use of force against student demonstrators during the 1956 Chinese middle schools riots, which reflected both anti-colonial and anti-communist sentiments, further eroded his popular support. These developments contributed to the LF's dramatic decline in the 1959 election and the rise of the People's Action Party (PAP) as the dominant political force.

=== Constitutional reforms ===
The Constitution of Singapore was significantly amended in 1958, replacing the Rendel Constitution and granting Singapore internal self-government. Under the revised constitutional framework, Singapore was given the authority to fully elect its Legislative Assembly, marking a major step toward democratic self-rule. Previously, the Rendel Constitution, drafted in 1955 by a commission headed by British diplomat George William Rendel, had introduced limited representative governance. Of the 32 seats in the Legislative Assembly under that system, only 25 were elected by the public by limited suffrage, while the remaining seven were appointed by the colonial administration. This was itself an improvement from the earlier pre-1955 Legislative Council, which allowed only nine members to be elected, with the majority of seats filled through colonial appointment.

The 1959 general election was the first to be held under the new constitution and marked the beginning of Singapore's era of full internal self-government. While Singapore was now recognised as a self-governing state with control over domestic policy, the British government retained authority over external affairs, including defence and foreign relations and maintained joint control over internal security. Nonetheless, the political reforms were widely seen as a foundational milestone in Singapore's path to full independence, which would only be realised in 1965.

Another significant reform introduced in 1959 was the implementation of compulsory voting. With the removal of earlier suffrage restrictions that had limited electoral participation, voting was made mandatory for all eligible citizens, a policy that has remained in place for every general election since.

=== Parties ===
On 10 November 1958, Chief Minister Lim Yew Hock established the Singapore People's Alliance (SPA), comprising former LF assembly members who had defected from the party. The SPA also sought to broaden its support by inviting members from the Liberal Socialist Party (LSP) and the Workers' Party (WP). Formed with the intention of presenting a rejuvenated image ahead of the 1959 general election, the SPA campaigned on promises to secure full employment, improve working conditions and achieve independence for Singapore through a merger with the Federation of Malaya.

Lim had previously succeeded David Marshall as Chief Minister in 1956 after Marshall resigned following unsuccessful negotiations with the British for self-government. While Lim's firm stance against left-wing activism satisfied British concerns about internal security, his administration faced growing public dissatisfaction. His tenure saw few improvements in living standards and was marred by the use of harsh measures against labour unions and student demonstrators. Allegations of corruption further damaged the government's credibility, leading to the resignation of all ten remaining elected LF assemblymen before the end of the term. These developments contributed to the formation of several new political parties, with Marshall establishing the WP in 1957, Lim the SPA in 1958 and a separate group of defectors founded the Citizens Party (CP) in early 1959.

In the run-up to the election, the SPA attempted to undermine the credibility of the PAP, which controlled the City Council of Singapore. The SPA accused the PAP of appointing supporters to Council positions and manipulating contract tenders. To support these claims, the government convened a Commission of Inquiry in April 1959 to investigate alleged improprieties. However, the inquiry failed to uncover any evidence of wrongdoing and the hearings were indefinitely adjourned. The LSP had also entered the race, having been formed from a merger of the Progressive Party (PP) and the Democratic Party (DP). The PP, which had previously dominated the 1948 and 1951 elections, had lost its influence by the mid-1950s as it was increasingly seen as too cautious and slow in pushing for reforms.

Another electoral contender were the Singaporean branches of the United Malays National Organisation (UMNO), the Malayan Chinese Association (MCA) and the Malayan Indian Congress (MIC). Their campaign had focused on raising living standards and enhancing economic integration with Malaya. Given that their parent coalition, the Alliance Party, held power in the Federation of Malaya under Tunku Abdul Rahman, they promised being in a strong position to negotiate for Singapore's early merger with the Federation. The Malay Union (MU), which had previously allied with UMNO and MCA in the previous election, had been expelled from the coalition in 1957 after unilaterally fielding a candidate in the Cairnhill by-election.

The PAP, then in opposition, declared its intention to contest all 51 seats in the Legislative Assembly. Its election manifesto, The Tasks Ahead, outlined a comprehensive five-year plan aimed at resolving Singapore's pressing socioeconomic issues. These included the provision of low-cost public housing, the expansion and reform of the education system and the promotion of industrialisation to create employment. The manifesto also reaffirmed the PAP's commitment to achieving full independence through merger with Malaya. A key theme of the PAP campaign was its stand against corruption. In contrast to the Lim's administration, PAP leaders and candidates adopted white shirts and trousers as their uniform, symbolising honesty and integrity in government, an image that continues to define the party's identity. In response, the SPA attempted to discredit the PAP by claiming it was under communist influence, a narrative that was echoed by the LSP and the local branches of UMNO. PAP leader Lee Kuan Yew dismissed these accusations as unfounded, calling them "silly", "blabbering" and "lies".

== Timeline ==
31 March	Dissolution of 1st Legislative Assembly
25 April	Nomination Day
30 May	Polling Day
5 June	Inauguration of the Cabinet with Lee Kuan Yew as inaugural Prime Minister
1 July	Opening of 2nd Legislative Assembly

== Changes to electoral boundaries ==
The 51 seats of the Legislative Assembly were elected from single-member constituencies, with an increase of 26 seats in this election. The changes among the constituencies were:

Constituency Name	Changes
Aljunied	Carved out of Paya Lebar
Anson	Carved out of Tanjong Pagar
Bras Basah	Carved out of Stamford
Bukit Merah	Absorbed part of Queenstown & Tiong Bahru
Chua Chu Kang	Carved out of Bukit Panjang
Crawford	Carved out of Rochore
Delta	Carved out of Havelock
Geylang East	Carved out of Geylang
Geylang Serai	Carved out of Ulu Bedok
Geylang West	Carved out of Geylang
Hong Lim	Carved out of Telok Ayer
Jalan Besar	Carved out of Kampong Kapor
Jalan Kayu	Carved out of Seletar
Joo Chiat	Carved out of Katong
Jurong	Carved out of Bukit Timah
Kallang	Absorbed part of Kampong Kapor & Whampoa
Kampong Glam	Carved out of Rochore
Kampong Kembangan	Carved out of Ulu Bedok
Kreta Ayer	Carved out of Telok Ayer
Moulmein	Carved out of Farrer Park
Mountbatten	Carved out of Katong
Nee Soon	Absorbed part of Seletar & Sembawang
Punggol	Carved out of Punggol–Tampines
River Valley	Absorbed part of Cairnhill & Tanglin
Sepoy Lines	Carved out of Tiong Bahru
Serangoon Gardens	Absorbed part of Serangoon & Seletar
Siglap	Absorbed part of Changi & Katong
Tampines	Carved out of Punggol–Tampines
Telok Blangah	Carved out of Pasir Panjang
Thomson	Absorbed part of Serangoon & Seletar
Toa Payoh	Carved out of Whampoa
Ulu Pandan	Carved out of Tanglin
Upper Serangoon	Absorbed part of Serangoon & Paya Lebar

== Incumbents not standing for re-election ==
The following incumbent elected members of the Legislative Assembly did not run in the 1959 election.

Incumbent	Party	Constituency	Elected in
A. J. Braga	SPA	Katong	1955
John Ede	Independent	Tanglin	1955
Rajabali Jumabhoy	LSP	Telok Ayer	1948
A. R. Lazarous	Independent	Farrer Park	1955
Lim Chin Siong	PAP	Bukit Timah	1955
Lim Koon Teck	SPA	Paya Lebar	1955

== Campaign ==
The election was dominated by a number of major issues, among them government corruption, the path toward independence and political stability in the face of communist influence. The ongoing communist insurgency led by the Malayan Communist Party (MCP), which had triggered the Malayan Emergency in 1948, remained a concern for both British authorities and local political actors. Although armed resistance in Singapore was less pronounced than in the Federation of Malaya, fears of subversion continued to influence security policy and political rhetoric.

The public's growing desire for self-rule was increasingly encapsulated in the rallying cry Merdeka, a Malay word meaning independence or freedom. Popular sentiment for immediate self-government intensified in the late 1950s, reflecting the broader decolonisation movement sweeping through Asia. Political leaders, including those from the PAP and SPA, recognised the term's powerful emotional and symbolic value. Demonstrators and political activists frequently chanted "We want Merdeka now!" at rallies and public meetings, pressing for the end of British colonial rule.

In the days leading up to the election, newspaper editorials and political analysts speculated that the presence of numerous parties and multi-cornered contests in many constituencies would divide the anti-PAP vote. This fragmentation was expected to benefit the PAP, which fielded candidates in all 51 constituencies and had a strong grassroots network and clear campaign message.

=== Chew Swee Kee affair ===
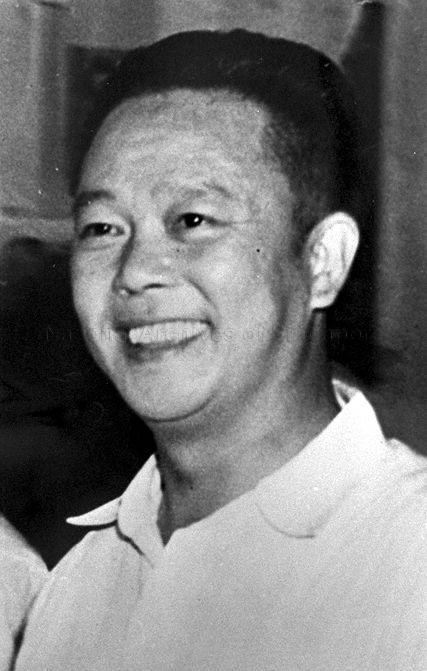
Chew Swee Kee

The Chew Swee Kee affair was a major controversy that surfaced during the election campaign and significantly influenced public opinion. A few months prior in February, the PAP accused Chew Swee Kee, then Minister for Education in Lim's Cabinet, to have obtained a large political donation from abroad under unclear circumstances. Following these accusations, a Commission of Inquiry was convened to investigate the matter. It was alleged that Chew had received between $700,000 and $800,000 from a foreign donor in New York City, which he later diverted for personal use. At the time, the public and press widely assumed the funding came from the United States, possibly through the Central Intelligence Agency (CIA), fuelling concerns about foreign interference.

Chew resigned from his ministerial position on 4 March, shortly after the allegations were made public. He also did not contest in the election. The scandal had a devastating impact on the SPA's credibility, particularly as the party was increasingly viewed as being aligned with foreign and non-local interests. For a population that was growing more anti-colonial and nationalist in sentiment, the perception that a senior minister had accepted funds from a foreign government was politically damaging. The incident is widely regarded as one of the key factors in the SPA's electoral collapse.

Subsequent scholarly research has clarified that the funding Chew received did not originate from the United States or the CIA, as previously suspected. Instead, it was channelled from the Republic of China (ROC, Taiwan) under the Kuomintang (KMT) government, which was then seeking to support anti-communist political forces in the region. Chew had personally met with George Yeh, the ROC's Foreign Minister and Ambassador to the United States, in September 1957 to solicit such funds.

== Results ==
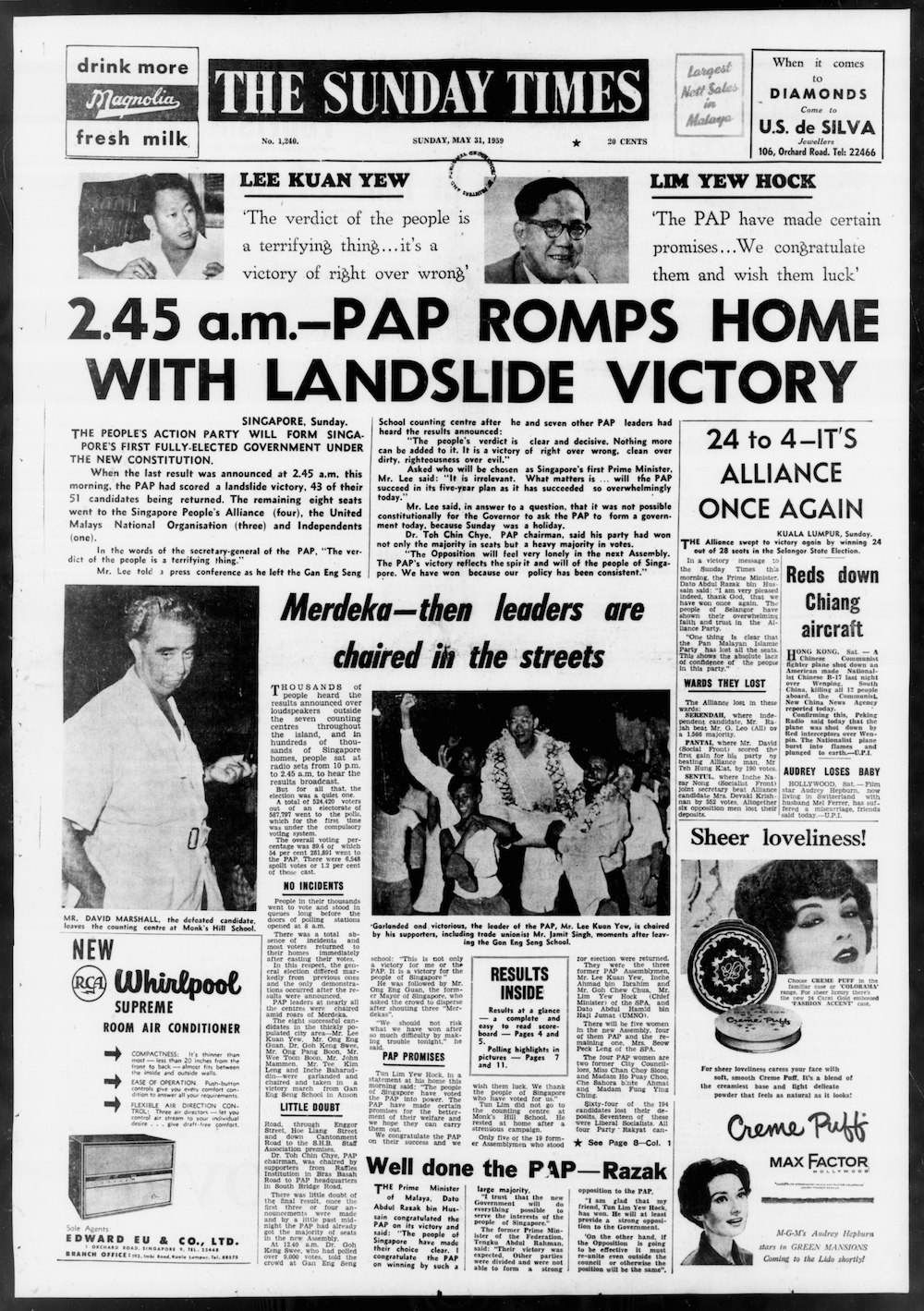
The Sunday Times the day after the 1959 election, reporting on the results and the PAP's victory.

The election results saw a landslide victory for the PAP, which secured 43 of the 51 seats in the Legislative Assembly. The SPA, despite contesting for 39 seats, won only four. The LF and the LSP, the latter having been formed through a merger of the DP and the PP, failed to win any seats. A total of 73 candidates, including 20 from the LSP, lost their $500 election deposit after failing to obtain at least 12.5% of the vote in their respective constituencies.

PAP candidate Wong Soon Fong achieved the highest vote share in the election, securing 77.66% in Toa Payoh. In contrast, Lillian Tan of the LSP received the lowest share, polling only 0.82% in Serangoon Gardens. In terms of absolute numbers, Goh Keng Swee of the PAP received the highest number of votes with 9,313 in Kreta Ayer, while Lillian Tan again recorded the lowest with only 64 votes. River Valley saw the narrowest winning margin in Singapore's electoral history, with PAP candidate Lim Cheng Lock winning with just five votes (an equivalent to a margin of 0.05%), against SPA's Soh Ghee Soon.

This was the first election held under compulsory voting and universal suffrage. As a result, voter turnout reached 90.07%, a record high at the time, with 527,919 of the 586,098 registered voters casting their ballots. This marked a significant increase from the 52.66% turnout recorded in the previous general election.

Popular vote
1. PAP (54.1%)
2. SPA (20.7%)
3. LSP (8.21%)
4. Independents (6.78%)
5. UMNO (5.27%)
6. Others (4.99%)
Seats won
1. 43 seats (PAP) (84.3%)
2. 4 seats (SPA) (7.84%)
3. 3 seat (UMNO) (5.88%)
4. 1 seat (Independent) (1.96%)

Graph of the party split among 51 seats.
Party	Votes	%	Seats	+/–
People's Action Party	281,891	54.08	43	+40
Singapore People's Alliance	107,755	20.67	4	New
Liberal Socialist Party	42,805	8.21	0	–6
United Malays National Organisation	27,448	5.27	3	+2
Malayan Chinese Association	5,593	1.07	0	–1
Workers' Party	4,127	0.79	0	New
Labour Front	3,414	0.65	0	–10
Citizens' Party	3,210	0.62	0	New
Malay Union	2,819	0.54	0	–1
Malayan Indian Congress	2,092	0.40	0	New
Partai Rakyat	2,006	0.38	0	New
Katong United Residents' Association	1,759	0.34	0	New
Pan-Malaysian Islamic Party	1,011	0.19	0	New
Independents	35,341	6.78	1	–2
Total	521,271	100.00	51	+26
Valid votes	521,271	98.74		
Invalid/blank votes	6,648	1.26		
Total votes	527,919	100.00		
Registered voters/turnout	586,098	90.07		
Source: Singapore Elections

Opposition parties contested vote
Party	Votes
UMNO	35.72%
SPA	27.02%
Independents	15.04%
LSP	13.21%
Workers'	12.61%
LF	11.72%
MIC	11.34%
MCA	9.95%
Malay	8.39%
Katong	7.86%
Citizens	5.64%
PR	4.15%
PMIP	2.74%

=== By constituency ===
Constituency	Electorate	Party	Candidate	Votes	%	Swing	Margin
Aljunied	13,255	People's Action Party	S. V. Lingam	5,701	49.40	N/A	6.04
Aljunied	13,255	Liberal Socialist Party	E. H. Holloway	5,004	43.36	N/A	6.04
Aljunied	13,255	Partai Rakyat	Tang Yoong Chiaw	835	7.24	N/A	6.04
Anson	9,921	People's Action Party	Baharudin Mohamed Ariff	5,167	60.75	N/A	38.71
Anson	9,921	Singapore People's Alliance	Goh Kong Beng	1,875	22.04	N/A	38.71
Anson	9,921	Liberal Socialist Party	Tan Cheng Chuan	1,231	14.47	N/A	38.71
Anson	9,921	Independent	Wong Swee Kee	117	1.38	N/A	38.71
Anson	9,921	Independent	P. Krishanan	116	1.36	N/A	38.71
Bras Basah	11,193	People's Action Party	Hoe Puay Choo	6,014	63.25	N/A	42.29
Bras Basah	11,193	Liberal Socialist Party	Foo Ho Fang	1,993	20.96	N/A	42.29
Bras Basah	11,193	Singapore People's Alliance	Goh Hin Shong	1,501	15.79	N/A	42.29
Bukit Merah	11,286	People's Action Party	Sellappa Ramaswamy	5,922	59.09	N/A	28.89
Bukit Merah	11,286	Singapore People's Alliance	Teo Cheng Hye	3,026	30.20	N/A	28.89
Bukit Merah	11,286	Independent	Lee Choon Eng	1,073	10.71	N/A	28.89
Bukit Panjang	11,984	People's Action Party	Lee Khoon Choy	6,156	58.31	N/A	34.69
Bukit Panjang	11,984	Liberal Socialist Party	Tan Leong Teck	2,494	23.62	N/A	34.69
Bukit Panjang	11,984	Singapore People's Alliance	Lim Siak Guan	1,382	13.09	N/A	34.69
Bukit Panjang	11,984	Malayan Indian Congress	T. K. Alexander	526	4.98	N/A	34.69
Bukit Timah	11,285	People's Action Party	Ya'acob Mohamed	6,174	61.14	▲8.69	36.78
Bukit Timah	11,285	Liberal Socialist Party	Pek Cheng Chuan	2,460	24.36	N/A	36.78
Bukit Timah	11,285	Independent	Lee Yew Seng	1,464	14.50	N/A	36.78
Cairnhill	12,239	Singapore People's Alliance	Lim Yew Hock	5,275	48.22	N/A	21.53
Cairnhill	12,239	Workers' Party	David Marshall	2,920	26.69	N/A	21.53
Cairnhill	12,239	People's Action Party	Oh Su Chen	2,262	20.68	N/A	21.53
Cairnhill	12,239	Liberal Socialist Party	Tan Keng Siong	483	4.41	N/A	21.53
Changi	11,199	People's Action Party	Teo Hock Guan	3,480	35.10	N/A	6.67
Changi	11,199	UMNO	Abdul Rahman Haji Mohamed Said	2,818	28.43	N/A	6.67
Changi	11,199	Independent	Lim Cher Kheng	2,225	22.45	N/A	6.67
Changi	11,199	Liberal Socialist Party	Wee Tin Teck	1,024	10.33	N/A	6.67
Changi	11,199	Malay Union	Fatimah Nor Bt. G. S.	366	3.69	N/A	6.67
Chua Chu Kang	6,889	People's Action Party	Ong Chang Sam	3,536	56.29	N/A	31.41
Chua Chu Kang	6,889	Independent	Neo Koon Hin	1,563	24.88	N/A	31.41
Chua Chu Kang	6,889	Singapore People's Alliance	Goh Tong Liang	1,183	18.83	N/A	31.41
Crawford	12,031	People's Action Party	K. M. Byrne	7,120	66.57	N/A	43.32
Crawford	12,031	Singapore People's Alliance	Teng Ling Siong	2,487	23.25	N/A	43.32
Crawford	12,031	Liberal Socialist Party	Chua Seng Kian	897	8.39	N/A	43.32
Crawford	12,031	Independent	Sim John	191	1.79	N/A	43.32
Delta	14,954	People's Action Party	Chan Choy Siong	9,301	69.45	N/A	60.40
Delta	14,954	Malayan Chinese Association	Chia Chee Buang	1,212	9.05	N/A	60.40
Delta	14,954	Liberal Socialist Party	Lim Ah Lee	2,308	17.23	N/A	60.40
Delta	14,954	Singapore People's Alliance	Munusamy Nadarajah	571	4.27	N/A	60.40
Farrer Park	10,293	Independent	A. P. Rajah	4,077	44.52	N/A	2.67
Farrer Park	10,293	People's Action Party	Tan Teck Ngiap	3,832	41.85	▼8.78	2.67
Farrer Park	10,293	Independent	Soo-Tho Sin Hee	789	8.62	N/A	2.67
Farrer Park	10,293	Independent	Chan Kooi Chew	311	3.40	N/A	2.67
Geylang East	15,562	People's Action Party	Mohamed Ismail Abdul Rahim	7,153	51.95	N/A	10.01
Geylang East	15,562	Singapore People's Alliance	Ng Cheng Chwee	5,775	41.94	N/A	10.01
Geylang East	15,562	Independent	Mak Pak Shee	842	6.11	N/A	10.01
Geylang Serai	14,447	UMNO	Abdul Hamid Jumat	7,940	63.09	N/A	32.64
Geylang Serai	14,447	People's Action Party	Roshan Hassan	3,832	30.45	N/A	32.64
Geylang Serai	14,447	Pan-Malayan Islamic Party	Syed Ahmad Dahlan	460	3.66	N/A	32.64
Geylang Serai	14,447	Partai Rakyat	Harun Mohamed Amin	353	2.80	N/A	32.64
Geylang West	15,570	People's Action Party	Yong Nyuk Lin	8,923	67.60	N/A	35.20
Geylang West	15,570	Singapore People's Alliance	Kwek Sam Hock	4,276	32.40	N/A	35.20
Havelock	15,909	People's Action Party	Low Por Tuck	9,227	63.60	N/A	39.05
Havelock	15,909	Independent	Ng See Thong	3,562	24.55	N/A	39.05
Havelock	15,909	Singapore People's Alliance	Tan Theng Chiang	963	6.64	N/A	39.05
Havelock	15,909	Malayan Chinese Association	K. S. Loke	433	2.98	N/A	39.05
Havelock	15,909	Liberal Socialist Party	Tan Ah Pak	323	2.23	N/A	39.05
Hong Lim	12,667	People's Action Party	Ong Eng Guan	8,834	77.02	N/A	66.63
Hong Lim	12,667	Malayan Chinese Association	Loh Ngian Lim	1,192	10.39	N/A	66.63
Hong Lim	12,667	Liberal Socialist Party	Tan Hong Chye	856	7.46	N/A	66.63
Hong Lim	12,667	Singapore People's Alliance	Sim Wee Teck	588	5.13	N/A	66.63
Jalan Besar	13,877	People's Action Party	Chan Chee Seng	7,600	62.48	N/A	41.33
Jalan Besar	13,877	Singapore People's Alliance	Wong Yew Hon	2,573	21.15	N/A	41.33
Jalan Besar	13,877	Liberal Socialist Party	Lo Ka Fat	1,488	12.23	N/A	41.33
Jalan Besar	13,877	Labour Front	See Eng Kiat	503	4.14	N/A	41.33
Jalan Kayu	8,690	People's Action Party	Tan Cheng Tong	4,837	62.28	N/A	24.56
Jalan Kayu	8,690	Singapore People's Alliance	M. P. D. Nair	2,929	37.72	N/A	24.56
Joo Chiat	15,257	Singapore People's Alliance	C. H. Koh	6,136	45.87	N/A	6.24
Joo Chiat	15,257	People's Action Party	Fong Kim Heng	5,301	39.63	N/A	6.24
Joo Chiat	15,257	Liberal Socialist Party	Gay Wan Guay	1,215	9.08	N/A	6.24
Joo Chiat	15,257	Katong United Residents' Association	Low Teck Cheng	405	3.03	N/A	6.24
Joo Chiat	15,257	Independent	Henry Chong	320	2.39	N/A	6.24
Jurong	7,176	People's Action Party	Chor Yeok Eng	4,502	70.67	N/A	49.87
Jurong	7,176	Singapore People's Alliance	Wong Tuck Leong	1,325	20.80	N/A	49.87
Jurong	7,176	Liberal Socialist Party	Chia Yeck Poh	375	5.89	N/A	49.87
Jurong	7,176	Malay Union	Aman B. H. Subri	168	2.64	N/A	49.87
Kallang	12,939	People's Action Party	Buang Omar Junid	5,690	48.18	N/A	6.13
Kallang	12,939	Singapore People's Alliance	Tan Hai Tong	4,967	42.05	N/A	6.13
Kallang	12,939	Citizens' Party	Seah Peng Chuan	1,154	7.18	N/A	6.13
Kampong Glam	10,934	People's Action Party	S. Rajaratnam	6,324	65.27	N/A	47.24
Kampong Glam	10,934	Singapore People's Alliance	Mahmood Latiff	1,747	18.03	N/A	47.24
Kampong Glam	10,934	Liberal Socialist Party	Ong Eng Lian	1,377	14.21	N/A	47.24
Kampong Glam	10,934	Independent	Wu Shiaw	241	2.49	N/A	47.24
Kampong Kapor	12,736	People's Action Party	G. Kandasamy	6,059	54.27	N/A	21.74
Kampong Kapor	12,736	Singapore People's Alliance	Chia Ban Wei	3,632	32.53	N/A	21.74
Kampong Kapor	12,736	Independent	Jaganathan S.	711	6.37	N/A	21.74
Kampong Kapor	12,736	Independent	Choo Yeok Koon	432	3.87	N/A	21.74
Kampong Kapor	12,736	Citizens' Party	Yen Jen San	330	2.96	N/A	21.74
Kampong Kembangan	13,007	UMNO	Mohammed Ali Alwi	4,443	38.86	N/A	2.13
Kampong Kembangan	13,007	People's Action Party	Othman Wok	4,199	36.73	N/A	2.13
Kampong Kembangan	13,007	Singapore People's Alliance	Mohd. b. Hj. Yacob	2,028	17.74	N/A	2.13
Kampong Kembangan	13,007	Pan-Malayan Islamic Party	H. M. Yahiya	317	2.77	N/A	2.13
Kampong Kembangan	13,007	Partai Rakyat	A. Latiff b. Ibrahim	231	2.02	N/A	2.13
Kampong Kembangan	13,007	Malay Union	Jaffar b. Abdul Ghani	215	1.88	N/A	2.13
Kreta Ayer	14,173	People's Action Party	Goh Keng Swee	9,313	73.35	N/A	46.70
Kreta Ayer	14,173	Liberal Socialist Party	Pang Man Ming	3,384	26.65	N/A	46.70
Moulmein	10,095	People's Action Party	Lin You Eng	4,324	47.25	N/A	4.03
Moulmein	10,095	Singapore People's Alliance	Yap Jin Yau	3,955	43.22	N/A	4.03
Moulmein	10,095	Liberal Socialist Party	Tan Peng Khoo	872	9.53	N/A	4.03
Mountbatten	10,212	Singapore People's Alliance	Chua Seng Kim	3,031	33.71	N/A	9.87
Mountbatten	10,212	People's Action Party	Tay Kum Sun	2,143	23.84	N/A	9.87
Mountbatten	10,212	Malayan Chinese Association	Wong Foo Nam	1,903	21.17	N/A	9.87
Mountbatten	10,212	Katong United Residents' Association	Felice Leon-Soh	1,354	15.06	N/A	9.87
Mountbatten	10,212	Liberal Socialist Party	Wee Soo Bee	559	6.22	N/A	9.87
Nee Soon	8,694	People's Action Party	Sheng Nam Chin	5,622	73.30	N/A	54.06
Nee Soon	8,694	Singapore People's Alliance	Yap Chin Poh	1,476	19.24	N/A	54.06
Nee Soon	8,694	Liberal Socialist Party	Yong Nyuk Khoon	572	7.46	N/A	54.06
Pasir Panjang	6,631	People's Action Party	Tee Kim Leng	2,123	36.00	N/A	4.05
Pasir Panjang	6,631	Independent	H. J. C. Kulasingha	1,884	31.95	N/A	4.05
Pasir Panjang	6,631	UMNO	Sukaimi Ibrahim	1,704	28.90	N/A	4.05
Pasir Panjang	6,631	Independent	S. T. V. Lingam	186	3.15	N/A	4.05
Paya Lebar	12,089	People's Action Party	Tan Kia Gan	6,531	60.81	N/A	21.62
Paya Lebar	12,089	Independent	Ong Chye Hock	4,209	39.19	N/A	21.62
Punggol	9,893	People's Action Party	Ng Teng Kian	4,072	46.39	N/A	4.75
Punggol	9,893	Singapore People's Alliance	Tan Jin Hong	3,655	41.64	N/A	4.75
Punggol	9,893	Liberal Socialist Party	Quah Heck Peck	554	6.31	N/A	4.75
Punggol	9,893	Independent	Tay Keng Hock	497	5.66	N/A	4.75
Queenstown	10,634	People's Action Party	Lee Siew Choh	5,301	53.81	N/A	16.93
Queenstown	10,634	Singapore People's Alliance	Chee Phui Hung	3,732	37.88	N/A	16.93
Queenstown	10,634	Independent	Lee Kim Chuan	818	8.31	N/A	16.93
River Valley	10,594	People's Action Party	Lim Cheng Lock	3,430	36.55	N/A	0.05
River Valley	10,594	Singapore People's Alliance	Soh Ghee Soon	3,425	36.50	N/A	0.05
River Valley	10,594	Liberal Socialist Party	E. K. Tan	2,529	26.95	N/A	0.05
Rochore	12,436	People's Action Party	Toh Chin Chye	7,995	71.76	N/A	51.91
Rochore	12,436	Singapore People's Alliance	K. C. Thomas	2,212	19.85	N/A	51.91
Rochore	12,436	Liberal Socialist Party	Tan Soo Wan	934	8.39	N/A	51.91
Sembawang	8,859	People's Action Party	Ahmad Ibrahim	4,316	54.69	N/A	35.85
Sembawang	8,859	Malayan Indian Congress	V. Jayaram	1,566	19.84	N/A	35.85
Sembawang	8,859	Singapore People's Alliance	Chew Seng	1,084	13.74	N/A	35.85
Sembawang	8,859	Liberal Socialist Party	Lau Sai Seng	926	11.73	N/A	35.85
Sepoy Lines	10,347	People's Action Party	Wee Toon Boon	5,352	58.35	N/A	16.70
Sepoy Lines	10,347	Singapore People's Alliance	Goh Su Chiang	3,820	41.65	N/A	16.70
Serangoon Gardens	8,631	People's Action Party	Leong Keng Seng	3,843	48.93	N/A	13.74
Serangoon Gardens	8,631	Singapore People's Alliance	Wee Eric Sian Beng	2,764	35.19	N/A	13.74
Serangoon Gardens	8,631	Malayan Chinese Association	Liao Ping	853	10.86	▼13.51	13.74
Serangoon Gardens	8,631	Labour Front	Victor Louis Fernandez	330	4.20	N/A	13.74
Serangoon Gardens	8,631	Liberal Socialist Party	Lilian Tan	64	0.82	N/A	13.74
Siglap	14,693	People's Action Party	Sahorah bte Ahmat	4,407	34.34	N/A	7.78
Siglap	14,693	Independent	Koh Tee Kin	3,408	26.56	N/A	7.78
Siglap	14,693	Liberal Socialist Party	John Snodgrass	1,511	11.78	N/A	7.78
Siglap	14,693	UMNO	Mohamed Sidik	1,418	11.05	N/A	7.78
Siglap	14,693	Independent	Abdullah Masood	1,267	9.87	N/A	7.78
Siglap	14,693	Partai Rakyat	Pang Toon Tin	587	4.57	N/A	7.78
Siglap	14,693	Pan-Malayan Islamic Party	A. Wanjor	234	1.83	N/A	7.78
Southern Islands	5,325	UMNO	Ahmad Jabri Mohammed Akib	2,598	53.73	N/A	28.39
Southern Islands	5,325	People's Action Party	Kum Teng Hock	1,225	25.34	N/A	28.39
Southern Islands	5,325	Liberal Socialist Party	Ismail Haji Hussain	1,012	20.93	N/A	28.39
Stamford	12,392	People's Action Party	Fung Yin Ching	5,372	49.18	N/A	14.30
Stamford	12,392	Singapore People's Alliance	J. M. Jumabhoy	3,810	34.88	N/A	14.30
Stamford	12,392	Workers' Party	Ang Meng Gee	925	8.47	N/A	14.30
Stamford	12,392	Liberal Socialist Party	Hooi Beng Guan	679	6.22	N/A	14.30
Stamford	12,392	Independent	Wong Chee Lim	136	1.25	N/A	14.30
Tampines	11,468	People's Action Party	Goh Chew Chua	7,461	73.27	N/A	53.23
Tampines	11,468	Singapore People's Alliance	Ong Phi Hok	2,041	20.04	N/A	53.23
Tampines	11,468	Independent	Lim Choo Ten	681	6.69	N/A	53.23
Tanglin	9,127	Singapore People's Alliance	Thio Chan Bee	2,698	34.41	N/A	3.97
Tanglin	9,127	UMNO	Ahmad Haji Taff	2,386	30.44	N/A	3.97
Tanglin	9,127	People's Action Party	Ibrahim Othman	2,360	30.11	N/A	3.97
Tanglin	9,127	Liberal Socialist Party	Chan Ah Wing	395	5.04	N/A	3.97
Tanjong Pagar	11,939	People's Action Party	Lee Kuan Yew	7,617	71.04	▼7.29	42.08
Tanjong Pagar	11,939	Liberal Socialist Party	C. Subramanyam	3,105	28.96	N/A	42.08
Telok Ayer	13,998	People's Action Party	Ong Pang Boon	8,372	67.38	N/A	40.43
Telok Ayer	13,998	Singapore People's Alliance	Tan Kian Kee	2,106	16.95	N/A	40.43
Telok Ayer	13,998	Independent	Tay Soo Yong	1,660	13.36	N/A	40.43
Telok Ayer	13,998	Citizens' Party	Soh Teck Chee	287	2.31	N/A	40.43
Telok Blangah	13,202	People's Action Party	John Mammen	5,803	50.41	N/A	14.44
Telok Blangah	13,202	UMNO	Osman Gani	4,141	35.97	N/A	14.44
Telok Blangah	13,202	Citizens' Party	Wee Kim Hock	1,230	10.69	N/A	14.44
Telok Blangah	13,202	Independent	V. Mariappan	337	2.93	N/A	14.44
Thomson	10,067	People's Action Party	S.T. Bani	4,978	54.63	N/A	26.30
Thomson	10,067	Labour Front	Francis Thomas	2,581	28.33	N/A	26.30
Thomson	10,067	Singapore People's Alliance	Yap Chin Choon	1,553	17.04	N/A	26.30
Tiong Bahru	12,151	People's Action Party	Lee Teck Him	5,175	47.66	N/A	27.57
Tiong Bahru	12,151	Singapore People's Alliance	Lin Wo Ling	2,182	20.09	N/A	27.57
Tiong Bahru	12,151	Independent	William Tan	1,730	15.93	N/A	27.57
Tiong Bahru	12,151	Liberal Socialist Party	Lee Bah Chee	996	9.17	N/A	27.57
Tiong Bahru	12,151	Independent	Lim Huan Seng	494	4.55	N/A	27.57
Tiong Bahru	12,151	Workers' Party	Chua Chin Kiat	282	2.60	N/A	27.57
Toa Payoh	12,551	People's Action Party	Wong Soon Fong	8,693	77.66	N/A	55.32
Toa Payoh	12,551	Singapore People's Alliance	Lee Poh Chee	2,500	22.34	N/A	55.32
Ulu Pandan	11,017	People's Action Party	Mohamed Ariff Suradi	4,420	45.44	N/A	13.57
Ulu Pandan	11,017	Singapore People's Alliance	Leslie Rayner	3,100	31.87	N/A	13.57
Ulu Pandan	11,017	Independent	S. Khalaff	1,083	11.13	N/A	13.57
Ulu Pandan	11,017	Independent	Low Boon Kiat	361	3.71	N/A	13.57
Ulu Pandan	11,017	Independent	Anthony Ponnusamy	296	3.04	N/A	13.57
Ulu Pandan	11,017	Liberal Socialist Party	M. Karthigesu	284	2.92	N/A	13.57
Ulu Pandan	11,017	Independent	Chua Kim Toh	183	1.89	N/A	13.57
Upper Serangoon	11,279	People's Action Party	Chan Sun Wing	4,497	45.06	N/A	1.25
Upper Serangoon	11,279	Singapore People's Alliance	Lim Choon Mong	4,372	43.81	N/A	1.25
Upper Serangoon	11,279	Liberal Socialist Party	Sim Cho Lang	901	9.03	N/A	1.25
Upper Serangoon	11,279	Citizens' Party	Tan Choon Teng	209	2.10	N/A	1.25
Source: ELD, Singapore Elections

Peter Lau (Low Por Tuck standing for Baisan Sosialis was defeated in the Kreta Ayer Consttuency. In the 1959 General Election , he was elected as Legislative Assemblyman for Havelock as a candidate for the People's Action Party (PAP).== Incumbents defeated ==

Incumbent		Constituency	Elected in	Winner	
Name	Party	Constituency	Elected in	Name	Party
Goh Tong Liang	SPA	Bukit Panjang (ran in Chua Chu Kang)	1955	Ong Chang Sam	PAP
J. M. Jumabhoy	SPA	Stamford	1955	Fung Yin Ching	PAP
Lee Choon Eng	Independent	Queenstown (ran in Bukit Merah)	1955	S. Ramasamy	PAP
Lim Cher Kheng	Independent	Changi	1955	Teo Hock Guan	PAP
Lim Choon Mong	SPA	Serangoon (ran in Upper Serangoon)	1955	Chan Sun Wing	PAP
Mak Pak Shee	Independent	Geylang (ran in Geylang East)	1955	Mohamed Ismail Abdul Rahim	PAP
Mohamed Sidik	UMNO	Southern Islands (ran in Siglap)	1955	Sahorah Ahmat	PAP
M. P. D. Nair	SPA	Seletar (ran in Jalan Kayu)	1955	Tan Cheng Tong	PAP
Seah Peng Chuan	CP	Kampong Kapor (ran in Kallang)	1955	Buang Omar Junid	PAP
Soh Ghee Soon	SPA	Cairnhill (ran in River Valley)	1957	Lim Cheng Lock	PAP
Tan Theng Chiang	SPA	Rochore (ran in Havelock)	1955	Low Por Tuck	PAP
William Tan	Independent	Tiong Bahru	1955	Lee Teck Him	PAP
Wong Foo Nam	MCA	Pasir Panjang (ran in Mountbatten)	1955	Chua Seng Kim	SPA

== Aftermath ==
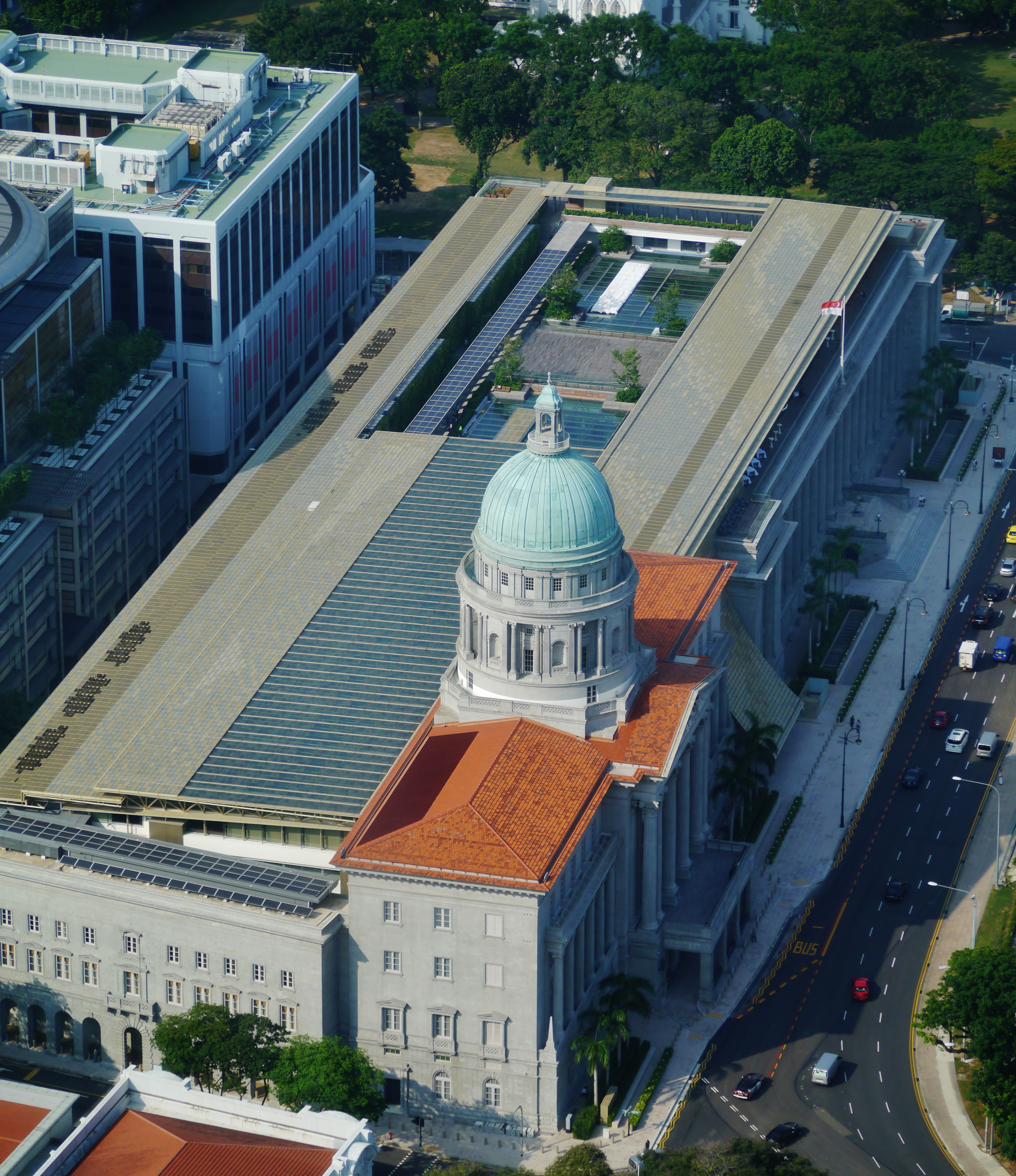
On 5 June, Lee Kuan Yew, along with his Cabinet ministers, was sworn in at the former City Hall. The building, together with the adjacent former Supreme Court building, has since been designated as national monuments and now forms the National Gallery Singapore.

The PAP formed a new government that assumed responsibility for domestic policies and governance without interference from the British colonial administration. This marked a significant transfer of power, as the PAP government was now able to shape Singapore's internal affairs independently. However, the United Kingdom retained control over defence and foreign affairs and shared joint responsibility for internal security under a specific agreement. Despite these limitations, historians generally regard the year 1959 as the moment Singapore attained full self-governance, given that the new government could operate with substantial autonomy and political legitimacy.

On 5 June, in a formal ceremony held at City Hall, Lee Kuan Yew was sworn in as Singapore's first Prime Minister by former Governor and now Yang di-Pertuan Negara William Goode. Alongside Lee, members of his cabinet also took their oaths of office. Prior to taking office, Lee asked Goode to release eight PAP members who had been detained in Changi Prison under the Preservation of Public Security Ordinance (PPSO) after the Chinese middle school student riots in 1956. These included Lim Chin Siong, Fong Swee Suan, Sandrasegaran Woodhull, James Puthucheary and Devan Nair, prominent left-wing leaders and labour organisers. Lee's call for their release during the campaign had significantly boosted the morale and support of trade unions and leftist groups among the electorate. Goode, after consulting with the Colonial Office in London, agreed to Lee's requests. They were released on 4 June.

After their release, internal tensions within the PAP began to emerge, as ideological and strategic rifts developed between the centrist leadership under Lee and the leftist faction led by Lim. Though the left had played a crucial role in the PAP's early success, they were gradually sidelined as the party shifted toward a more centrist stance. These divisions came to a head in 1961, when most left-wing members were expelled and went on to form the Barisan Sosialis (BS), which quickly became the main opposition force and posed the most serious electoral challenge to the PAP at the time. However, their momentum towards the next election was severely disrupted by Operation Coldstore in 1963, a major internal anti-communist security operation which saw the arrest and detention of many left-wing leaders and activists. Ironically, some of those detained had been among those whom Lee had earlier advocated releasing in 1959. Despite this, the BS's near success highlighted the lasting influence of the left-wing movement that had once been central to the PAP's rise, even as it was ultimately brushed aside in the party's consolidation of power.

=== By-elections ===
During the parliamentary term following this election, two by-elections were held in 1961. The first took place in Hong Lim, where former PAP minister Ong Eng Guan contested as an independent candidate after resigning from the party. He successfully regained his seat, reflecting his personal popularity and the growing factional tensions within the PAP. The second by-election occurred in Anson following the death of PAP's Baharuddin Mohammed Ariff. David Marshall, a prominent opposition figure and former Chief Minister of Singapore, won the seat.

== Bibliography ==
- Lee, Edwin (2008). Singapore: The Unexpected Nation. Institute of Southeast Asian Studies. ISBN 9789812307965.
