= Rajabali Jumabhoy =

Singapore businessman (1898–1998)

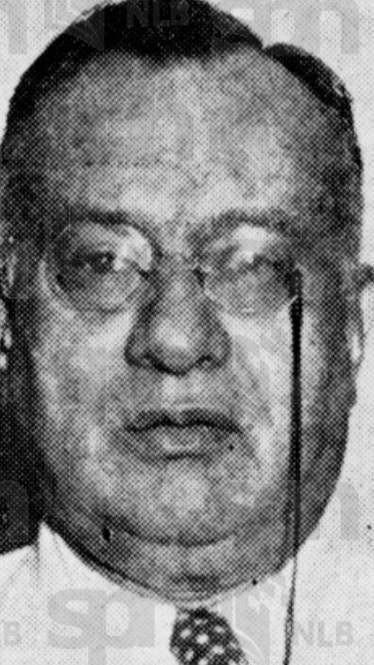
Jumabhoy in 1954

Rajabali Jumabhoy (16 January 1898 — 26 November 1998) was a businessman, politician and the chairman of Scotts Holdings in Singapore.

== Early life ==
Jumabhoy was born on 16 January 1898 in the village of Lakhapar in Kutch district, India. His grandfather was Bunder Kassim, a prominent merchant. He was raised in his elder sister's home in Bhopal and attended the University of Bombay in Bombay.

== Career ==
In August 1915, he and one of his brothers established a business on 9 Market Street in Singapore under the name R. Jumabhoy. Shortly, on Singapore on 24 June 1916 he took over the business, but had to leave to India a few months later due to ill health and his difficulty adjusting to the climate, and only returned to Singapore in January 1918. However, Jumabhoy eventually had a falling out with his brother. Following this, he left the businesses and established his own business on 2 January 1922. In 1923, he became a founding member of the Singapore Indian Association. In the following year, he became a founding member of the Indian Merchants Association and made a foray into property development. By then, he had established offices in Hong Kong, Java and Bombay. His business traded in coffee, sago flour, Benzoin, rattan and gambier.

From 1929 to 1935, Jumabhoy served on the committee of the Straits Settlements Association. From 1930 to 1935, he served as the president of the Indian Merchants Association. In 1930, he became a founding member of the Rotary Club of Singapore, and was made a Justice of the Peace. From 1932 to 1934, he served as the only Indian member of the Straits Settlements Trade Commission. In 1935, he became a founding member of the Indian Chamber of Commerce, and was appointed its first president. He served as the Chamber of Commerce's president in 1935, in 1936, from 1940 to 1942, from 1945 to 1950 and in 1953. From 1936 to 1937, he served on the committee of the Singapore Ratepayers' Association. In 1938, he received the Malayan Certificate of Honour. In November 1939, he was appointed to the Trafic Advisory Committee. By then, he had helped to found and served as the president of the Muslim Students Society. He had also served on the Poppy Day committee, and the chairman of the reception committee of the All Malaya Indian Conference.

Jumabhoy fled to India on 7 February 1942, fearing that he would be punished by the Japanese for the positions he had held while Singapore was under British rule. He returned to Singapore following the end of the Japanese occupation in 1945, and resumed his position as the president of the Indian Chamber of Commerce. On 1 January 1948, he renamed his company to R Jumabhoy & Sons. In 1953, he was conferred the CBE. In 1991, Scotts Holdings went public. The Rajabali Jumabhoy Foundation was formed in the following year.

== Political career ==
From 1938 to 1941, Jumabhoy was a member of the Municipal Commission of Singapore. He resumed his position as a member of the Municipal Commission in 1946, and left the commission in 1947. He was elected into the Legislative Council of Singapore by the Indian Chamber of Commerce during the 1948 Singaporean general election. On 12 July 1951, he was appointed a member of the Executive Council. During the 1955 Singaporean general election, he ran as an independent candidate for the Telok Ayer Constituency and won the election. He retired from politics in 1959.

== Personal life and death ==
Jumabhoy married Fatimabai Premji on 11 May 1920. Together, they had seven children, including Ameerali R. Jumabhoy. In October 1995, he initiated court action against Ameerali over the management of Scotts Holdings.

He died of natural causes on 26 November 1998 at the Mount Elizabeth Hospital.

He is related to Andre Jumabhoy, a former prosecutor and criminal lawyer who defended Pritam Singh in criminal charges for allegedly falsely testifying to the Committee of Privileges.
