= Abdul Aziz Karim =

Singaporean politician

Abdul Aziz bin Karim (Note: Jawi: عبد العزيز بن کریم) is a Singaporean politician who served as a Member of Parliament representing Kallang from 1968 to 1976. He was a member of the People's Action Party.

== Early life and career ==
Aziz was educated in Victoria School and was the vice president of the National Trades Union Congress.
