= Kallang Single Member Constituency =

Electoral ward in Singapore

Coordinates: 1.323°N 103.862°E

Kallang
- Former Single member constituency
- Region: Central Region, Singapore

Former constituency
- Created: 1959
- Abolished: 1991
- Seats: 1
- Replaced by: Jalan Besar Group Representation Constituency

Kallang Single Member Constituency was a single member constituency (SMC) spanning Kallang of Singapore. It existed as Kallang Constituency from 1959 to 1988 then it was renamed as Kallang Single Member Constituency during political reform in 1988. The SMC lasted another term till 1991 when it was absorbed into Jalan Besar Group Representation Constituency (GRC).

== History ==
In 1988, following the establishment of Group representation constituency (GRC) and SMC, the constituency was renamed as Kallang Single Member Constituency.

In 1991, the SMC was merged into Jalan Besar GRC.

== Member of Parliament ==
| Year | Member | Party |
|---|---|---|
Formation
Legislative Assembly of Singapore
| 1959 | Buang bin Omar Junid | PAP |
| 1963 | Buang bin Omar Junid | PAP |
Parliament of Singapore
| 1968 | Abdul Aziz Karim | PAP |
| 1972 | Abdul Aziz Karim | PAP |
| 1976 | S. Dhanabalan | PAP |
| 1980 | S. Dhanabalan | PAP |
| 1984 | S. Dhanabalan | PAP |
| 1988 | S. Dhanabalan | PAP |
Constituency abolished (1991)

== Electoral results ==
Note: The Elections Department does not include rejected votes when calculating the vote shares of candidates. Hence, all candidates' vote shares will total to 100% at any given election (may not appear so in multi-way contests due to rounding).

=== Elections in 1950s ===
General Election 1959
| Party | Candidate | Votes | % |
|---|---|---|---|
| PAP | Buang bin Omar Junid | 5,690 | 48.18 |
| SPA | Tan Hai Tong | 4,967 | 42.05 |
| Citizens' Party | Seah Peng Chuan | 1,154 | 9.77 |
| Majority | | 723 | 6.13 |
| Total valid votes | | 11,811 | 98.56 |
| Rejected ballots | | 173 | 1.44 |
| Turnout | | 11,984 | 92.64 |
| Registered electors | | 12,936 | |
| PAP win (new seat) | | | |

=== Elections in 1960s ===
General Election 1963
| Party | Candidate | Votes | % | ±% |
|---|---|---|---|---|
| PAP | Buang bin Omar Junid | 8,479 | 52.21 | ▲4.21 |
| BS | P. Oorjitham | 5,215 | 32.11 | N/A |
| Singapore Alliance | Tan Hock Lim | 969 | 5.97 | N/A |
| Independent | Tan Hai Tong | 411 | 2.53 | N/A |
| Majority | | 3,264 | 20.10 | ▲13.97 |
| Total valid votes | | 16,240 | 99.08 | ▲0.52 |
| Rejected ballots | | 173 | 1.44 | ▼0.52 |
| Turnout | | 16,391 | 96.57 | ▲3.93 |
| Registered electors | | 16,974 | | ▲31.22 |
| PAP hold | | Swing | ▲4.21 | |

General Election 1968
| Party | Candidate | Votes | % | ±% |
|---|---|---|---|---|
| PAP | Abdul Aziz Karim | Unopposed | | |
| Registered electors | | 9,309 | | ▼45.16 |
| PAP hold | | | | |

=== Elections in 1970s ===
1972 - Number of Electors: 17,232
| Candidates | Party | Total Votes | % |
|---|---|---|---|
| Abdul Aziz Karim | PAP | 12,626 | 79.75 |
| Sultan Mydin Bin Abdul Hamid | UNF | 3,205 | 20.25 |

1976 - Number of Electors: 17,282
| Candidate | Party | Total Votes | % |
|---|---|---|---|
| Chan Yoke Kwong | UF | 4,175 | 26.10 |
| S. Dhanabalan | PAP | 11,823 | 73.90 |

=== Elections in 1980s ===
General Election 1980
| Party | Candidate | Votes | % | ±% |
|---|---|---|---|---|
| PAP | S. Dhanabalan | Unopposed | | |
| Registered electors | | 16,222 | | |
| PAP hold | | | | |

1984 - Number of Electors: 18,809
| Candidate | Party | Votes | % |
|---|---|---|---|
| A L Sundram | WP | 6075 | 35.05 |
| S Dhanabalan | PAP | 11,256 | 64.95 |

1988- Number of Electors: 21,245
| Candidate | Party | Votes | % |
|---|---|---|---|
| A L Sundram | WP | 6,707 | 33.87 |
| S Dhanabalan | PAP | 13,097 | 66.13 |
