= Kampong Kapor Constituency =

Historical constituency in Singapore

Coordinates: 1.3067°N 103.854°E

Kampong Kapor
- Former Single Member constituency for the Parliament of Singapore
- Electorate: 13,815 (1955)

Former constituency
- Created: 1951
- Abolished: 1976
- Seats: 1
- Created from: Rochore Constituency
- Replaced by: Jalan Besar Constituency

Kampong Kapor Constituency was a constituency in Singapore. It used to exist from 1955 to 1976.

== Member of Parliament ==
Year	Member	Party
Formation
Legislative Assembly of Singapore
1955	Seah Peng Chuan	LF
1959	G. Kandasamy	PAP
1963	Mahmud Awang	PAP
Parliament of Singapore
1968	Lim Cheng Lock	PAP
1970	Yeo Toon Chia	PAP
1972	Yeo Toon Chia	PAP
Constituency abolished (1976)

== Electoral results ==
Note: The Elections Department does not include rejected votes when calculating the vote shares of candidates. Hence, all candidates' vote shares will total to 100% at any given election (may not appear so in multi-way contests due to rounding).

=== Elections in 1950s ===
General Election 1955
Party	Candidate	Votes	%
LF	Seah Peng Chuan	3,253	45.60
Independent	Dasaratha Raj	2,155	30.21
DP	Wong Shian Yein	1,283	17.98
PP	Lim Kian Lee	443	6.21
Majority		1,098	15.39
Total valid votes		7,134	99.10
Rejected ballots		65	0.90
Turnout		7,199	52.11
Registered electors		13,815	
PAP win (new seat)			

General Election 1959
Party	Candidate	Votes	%	±%
PAP	G. Kandasamy	6,059	54.27	N/A
SPA	Chia Ban Wei	3,632	32.53	N/A
Citizens' Party (Singapore)	Yen Jen San	330	2.96	N/A
Independent	Jaganathan S	711	6.37	N/A
Independent	Choo Yeok Koon	432	3.87	N/A
Majority		2,427	21.74	▲6.35
Total valid votes		11,164	87.66	▼11.44
Rejected ballots		291	12.34	▲11.44
Turnout		11,455	97.46	▲45.35
Registered electors		12,736		▼7.81
PAP gain from LF		Swing	N/A	

== Historical maps ==
1955 General Election
