= Upper Serangoon Constituency =

Historical constituency in Singapore

Upper Serangoon Constituency was a constituency in Upper Serangoon, Singapore from 1959 to 1980. In 1959, the constituency is formed by absorbing part of Serangoon and Paya Lebar constituencies.

== Member of Parliament ==
Election	Member of Parliament	Party
Legislative Assembly of Singapore
1959	Chan Sun Wing	PAP
1963	Sia Kah Hui	PAP
Parliament of Singapore
1972	Sia Kah Hui	PAP
1976	Sia Kah Hui	PAP

== Electoral results ==
Note: The Elections Department does not include rejected votes when calculating the vote shares of candidates. Hence, all candidates' vote shares will total to 100% at any given election (may not appear so in multi-way contests due to rounding).

=== Elections in 1950s ===
General Election 1959
Party	Candidate	Votes	%
PAP	Chan Sun Wing	4,497	45.06
SPA	Lim Choon Mong	4,372	43.81
LSP	Sin Cho Lang	901	9.03
Citizens' Party (Singapore)	Tan Choon Teng	209	2.1
Majority		125	1.34
Registered electors		11,279	
Turnout		9,979	88.47
PAP win (new seat)			

=== Elections in 1960s ===
General Election 1963
Party	Candidate	Votes	%	±%
PAP	Sia Kah Hui	6,650	56.56	N/A
BS	Chia Yang Loong	3,547	30.17	N/A
Independent	Lim Choon Mong	573	4.87	N/A
UPP	Phua Gek Boon	595	5.06	N/A
SA	Wu Moh Chye	393	3.34	N/A
Majority		3103	26.39	▲25.05
Registered electors		12,433		▲10.23
Turnout		11,758	94.57	▲6.1
PAP hold		Swing	▲25.05	
