= Bras Basah Constituency =

Former electoral division in Singapore

Coordinates: 1.296°N 103.855°E

Bras Basah
- Former Single Member constituency for the Parliament of Singapore
- Region: Singapore

Former constituency
- Created: 1959
- Abolished: 1976
- Seats: 1
- Party: People's Action Party
- Member: Ho See Beng
- Town Council: Jalan Besar
- Replaced by: Jalan Besar GRC

Bras Basah Single Member Constituency was a constituency in Singapore. It existed from 1959 to 1976. It was represented in the Parliament of Singapore by Hoe Puay Choo from 1959 to 1963 then by Ho See Beng from 1963 to 1976.

== History ==
In 1976, the constituency was abolished and the electorate was divided between Kampong Glam Constituency and Telok Ayer Constituency.

== Member of Parliament ==
Year	Member	Party
Formation
1959	Hoe Puay Choo	PAP
1963	Ho See Beng	PAP
1968	Ho See Beng	PAP
1972	Ho See Beng	PAP
Constituency abolished (1976)

== Electoral results ==
Note: The Elections Department does not include rejected votes when calculating the vote shares of candidates. Hence, all candidates' vote shares will total to 100% at any given election (may not appear so in multi-way contests due to rounding).

=== Elections in 1950s ===
General Election 1959
Party	Candidate	Votes	%
PAP	Hoe Puay Choo	6,014	63.25
LSP	Foo Ho Fang	1,993	20.96
SPA	Goh Hin Shong	1,501	15.79
Majority		4,021	42.29
Total valid votes		9,508	98.82
Rejected ballots		114	1.18
Turnout		9,622	85.96
Registered electors		11,193	
PAP win (new seat)			

=== Elections in 1960s ===
General Election 1963
Party	Candidate	Votes	%	±%
PAP	Ho See Beng	4,926	51.80	▼11.45
BS	Leong Kwan Fai	3,831	40.28	N/A
UPP	Pan Cheng Luan	335	3.52	N/A
SA	Wong Chin Sen	304	3.20	▼12.59
WP	Chiang Seok Keong	114	1.20	N/A
Majority		1,095	11.52	▼30.77
Total valid votes		9,510	99.05	▲0.23
Rejected ballots		91	0.95	▼0.23
Turnout		9,601	89.91	▲3.95
Registered electors		10,678		▼4.60
PAP hold		Swing	▼11.45	

General Election 1968
Party	Candidate	Votes	%	±%
PAP	Ho See Beng	Unopposed		
Registered electors		9,718		▼8.99
PAP hold				

=== Elections in 1970s ===
General Election 1972
Party	Candidate	Votes	%	±%
PAP	Ho See Beng	Unopposed		
Registered electors		8,323		▼14.35
PAP hold				
