= Geylang East Constituency =

Former electoral division in Singapore

Geylang East Constituency was a constituency in Singapore. It used to exist from 1959 to 1980.

== Member of Parliament ==
Election	Member of Parliament	Party
Legislative Assembly of Singapore
1959	Mohamed Ismail bin Abdul Rahim	PAP
1963		
Parliament of Singapore
1968		PAP
1972		
1976		
1980		

== Electoral results ==
Note: The Elections Department does not include rejected votes when calculating the vote shares of candidates. Hence, all candidates' vote shares will total to 100% at any given election (may not appear so in multi-way contests due to rounding).

=== Elections in 1950s ===
General Election 1959: Geylang East
Party	Candidate	Votes	%	±%
PAP	Mohamed Ismail bin Abdul Rahim	7,153	51.95	
SPA	Ng Cheng Chwee	5,775	41.94	
Independent	Mak Pak Shee	842	6.11	
Turnout		15,562	88.5	N/A
PAP win (new seat)				
