= Telok Ayer Constituency =

Historical constituency of Singapore

Telok Ayer
- Former Single Member constituency for the Parliament of Singapore
- Region: Singapore

Former constituency
- Created: 1955
- Abolished: 1988
- Seats: 1
- Member: Constituency Abolished

Telok Ayer Constituency was a constituency in Singapore. It existed from 1951 to 1988, where it was absorbed into Kreta Ayer SMC.

== History ==
In 1988, the constituency was dissolved following the establishment of Group representation constituency (GRC) and Single Member Constituency (SMC).

== Member of Parliament ==
Election	Member	Party
Formation
Legislative Assembly of Singapore
1955	Rajabali Jumabhoy	INDP
1959	Ong Pang Boon	PAP
1963	Ong Pang Boon	PAP
Parliament of Singapore
1968	Ong Pang Boon	PAP
1972	Ong Pang Boon	PAP
1976	Ong Pang Boon	PAP
1980	Ong Pang Boon	PAP
1984	Ong Pang Boon	PAP
Constituency abolished (1988)

== Electoral results ==
Note: The Elections Department does not include rejected votes when calculating the vote shares of candidates. Hence, all candidates' vote shares will total to 100% at any given election (may not appear so in multi-way contests due to rounding).

=== Elections in 1950s ===
Legislative Assembly General Election 1955: Telok Ayer
Party	Candidate	Votes	%
Independent	Rajabali Jumabhoy	1,945	39.90
DP	Sng Siak Hwee	1,477	30.30
LF	Tan Ewe Chee	1,453	29.80
Total valid votes		4,875	100
Rejected ballots		76	1.58
Majority		468	9.60
Registered electors		11,547	
Turnout		4,951	42.87
Independent win (new seat)			

Legislative Assembly General Election 1959: Telok Ayer
Party	Candidate	Votes	%	
PAP	Ong Pang Boon	8,372	67.38	N/A
Citizens' Party (Singapore)	Soh Teck Chee	287	2.31	N/A
SPA	Tan Kian Kee	2,106	16.95	N/A
Independent	Tay Soo Yong	1,660	13.36	N/A
Total valid votes		12,425	100	N/A
Rejected ballots		238	1.59	N/A
Majority		6,266	50.43	N/A
Registered electors		13,998		
Turnout		12,586	89.91	N/A
PAP gain from Independent		Swing	{{{swing}}}	

=== Elections in 1960s ===
Legislative Assembly General Election 1963: Telok Ayer
Party	Candidate	Votes	%	±%
PAP	Ong Pang Boon	5,390	44.01	
BS	Lam Chit Lee	4,987	40.72	
UPP	Goh Hong Keng	1,484	12.12	
Independent	Wang Chung Kwang	385	3.15	
Majority		403	3.29	{{{change}}}
Registered electors		13,219		
Total valid votes		12,246		
PAP hold		Swing	-23.37	

Parliamentary General Election 1968: Telok Ayer
Party	Candidate	Votes	%	±%
PAP	Ong Pang Boon	Walkover		
Registered electors		11,721		
PAP hold		Swing	N/A	

=== Elections in 1970s ===
Parliamentary General Election 1972: Telok Ayer
Party	Candidate	Votes	%	±%
PAP	Ong Pang Boon	7,612	83.98	N/A
UNF	Ng Oh Chew	1,452	16.02	N/A
Total valid votes		9,064	100	
Rejected ballots		238	1.59	N/A
Majority		6,160	67.96	N/A
Registered electors		10,547		
Turnout		9,248	87.68	N/A
PAP hold				

Parliamentary General Election 1976: Telok Ayer
Party	Candidate	Votes	%	±%
PAP	Ong Pang Boon	Walkover	N/A	
Registered electors		15,515		
PAP hold				

=== Elections in 1980s ===
Parliamentary General Election 1980: Telok Ayer
Party	Candidate	Votes	%
PAP	Ong Pang Boon	Walkover	N/A
Registered electors		12,381	
PAP hold			

Parliamentary General Election 1984: Telok Ayer
Party	Candidate	Votes	%
PAP	Ong Pang Boon	Walkover	N/A
Registered electors		13,984	
PAP hold			

== Historical maps ==
1955 General Election
