= Sepoy Lines Constituency =

Former Singaporean constituency

Sepoy Lines Constituency was a constituency in Singapore. It used to exist from 1959 to 1976, whereby it consists of Singapore General Hospital. Wee Toon Boon was a member of parliament for the constituency until 1976.

== Member of Parliament ==
Year	Member of Parliament	Party
Legislative Assembly of Singapore
1959	Wee Toon Boon	PAP
1963	Wee Toon Boon	PAP
Parliament of Singapore
1968	Wee Toon Boon	PAP
1972	Wee Toon Boon	PAP

== Electoral results ==
Note: The Elections Department does not include rejected votes when calculating the vote shares of candidates. Hence, all candidates' vote shares will total to 100% at any given election (may not appear so in multi-way contests due to rounding).

=== Elections in 1950s ===
General Election 1959: Sepoy Lines
Party	Candidate	Votes	%
PAP	Wee Toon Boon	5,352	58.35
SPA	Goh Su Chiang	3,820	41.65
Majority		1,532	16.70
Registered electors		10,347	
Total valid votes		9,172	99.06
Rejected ballots		87	0.94
Turnout		9,259	89.48
PAP win (new seat)			

=== Elections in 1960s ===
General Election 1963: Sepoy Lines
Party	Candidate	Votes	%	±%
PAP	Wee Toon Boon	4,907	52.25	▼6.1
BS	Ong Chang Sam	3,147	33.51	N/A
SA	Goh Su Chiang	793	8.44	N/A
UPP	Tan Choon Sing	914	545	5.80
Majority		1,760	18.74	▲2.04
Registered electors		10,046		▲2.91
Total valid votes		9,392	99.14	▲0.08
Rejected ballots		81	0.86	▼0.08
Turnout		9,473	94.30	▲4.82
PAP hold		Swing	▼6.1	

General Election 1968: Sepoy Lines
Party	Candidate	Votes	%	±%
PAP	Wee Toon Boon	Unopposed		
Registered electors		11,409		▲13.57
PAP hold				

=== Elections in 1970s ===
General Election 1972: Sepoy Lines
Party	Candidate	Votes	%	±%
PAP	Wee Toon Boon	9,160	81.30	N/A
UNF	Ho Soo Hock	2,107	18.70	N/A
Majority		7,053	62.60	N/A
Registered electors		12,308		▲7.88
Total valid votes		11,267	98.01	N/A
Rejected ballots		229	1.99	N/A
Turnout		11,496	93.40	N/A
PAP hold				
