= Sheng Nam Chin =

Singaporean politician

Dr Sheng Nam Chin (Chinese: 盛南君; 1930 – 21 April 2007) was a Singaporean politician who had served as a Member of Parliament representing Nee Soon from 1959-1963. He was a member of the People's Action Party (PAP). Sheng was the Parliamentary Secretary for Health from 1959 to 1961.

In 1961, he left the PAP and became a founding member of the Barisan Sosialis.

Sheng Nam Chin

== Early life ==
Sheng was educated at Victoria School.
