= Citizens' Party (Singapore) =

- Chinese name: 公民党
- Malay name: Parti Warganegara
- Founder: Seah Peng Chuan
- Founded: 25 February 1959; 67 years ago
- Merged into: Workers' Party

The Citizens' Party (Chinese: 公民党; pinyin: Gōng Mín Dǎng) was a political party in Singapore.

== History ==
The party was established on 25 February 1959 by Seah Peng Chuan. Seah had been elected to the Legislative Assembly in 1955 elections as a member of the Labour Front, but had left the party to sit as an independent.

In the May 1959 elections the party nominated five candidates for the 51 seats in the Assembly. However, it received only 0.6% of the vote and failed to win a seat.

The party subsequently merged into the Workers' Party on 13 September 1960. On 14 September, the party ceased to exist.

== Election results ==
=== Legislative Assembly ===
Election	Leader	Votes	%	Seats				Position	Result
Election	Leader	Votes	%	Contested			Total	Position	Result
Election	Leader	Votes	%	Seats	Won	Lost	Total	Position	Result
1959	Seah Peng Chuan	3,210	0.62%	5	0	5	0 / 51	8th	No seats

==== Seats contested ====
Election	Constituencies contested	Contested vote %
1959	Kallang, Kampong Kapor, Telok Ayer, Telok Blangah, Upper Serangoon	5.6%
