= Singapore People's Alliance =

Former Political party in Singapore

- Chinese name: 新加坡人民联盟
- Malay name: Perikatan Rakyat Singapura
- Founder: Lim Yew Hock
- Founded: 10 November 1958; 67 years ago
- Dissolved: 16 May 1965; 61 years ago
- Preceded by: Liberal Socialist Party
- Ideology: Socialism
- Political position: Left-wing
- National affiliation: Singapore Alliance Party

The Singapore People's Alliance (abbreviation: SPA) was a political alliance in Singapore founded in 1958, consisting of the Liberal Socialist Party (LSP) and former members of the Labour Front (LF). It contested the 1959 general election and became the opposition; and the 1963 general election under the Singapore Alliance Party (SAP) in which it failed to win any seats.

== History ==
SPA was led by the former Chief Minister Lim Yew Hock to contest the 1959 general election. SPA wanted to promote the standard of living for workers through socialist and welfare programmes. The 1959 general election was won by the People's Action Party (PAP). SPA had fielded 39 candidates and won only four seats, Lim was relegated to the leader-of-the-opposition in the legislative assembly.

SPA did not play any significant role in the national referendum in September 1962, which approved the terms of Singapore's merger into Malaya. The merger was executed on 9 July 1963.

SPA contested the subsequent 1963 general election under the SAP, which was a branch of the federal Alliance Party. SPA's presence within the alliance sparked friction with elements of the Singapore branch of the United Malay National Organisation (UMNO).

During the 1963 election, SAP fared poorly against the PAP, losing all four seats held by its constituent parties. This was partly attributed by historian Albert Lau to the failure of Lim to stand in the elections. Meanwhile, the political focus had shifted to PAP's rivalries, with UNMO at the federal level, and Barisan Sosialis (BS) at the national level. SPA was eventually dissolved on 16 May 1965.

== Election results ==
=== Legislative Assembly ===
Election	Leader	Votes	%	Seats					Position	Result
Election	Leader	Votes	%	Contested			Total	+/–	Position	Result
Election	Leader	Votes	%	Seats	Won	Lost	Total	+/–	Position	Result
1959	Lim Yew Hock	107,755	20.67%	39	4	35	4 / 51	▲4	▲2nd	Opposition

==== Seats contested ====
Election	Constituencies contested	Contested vote %
1959	Anson, Bras Basah, Bukit Merah, Bukit Panjang, Cairnhill, Chua Chu Kang, Crawford, Delta, Geylang East, Geylang West, Havelock, Hong Lim, Jalan Besar, Jalan Kayu, Joo Chiat, Jurong, Kallang, Kampong Glam, Kampong Kapor, Kampong Kembangan, Moulmein, Mountbatten, Nee Soon, Punggol, Queenstown, River Valley, Rochore, Sembawang, Sepoy Lines, Serangoon Gardens, Stamford, Tampines, Tanglin, Telok Ayer, Thomson, Tiong Bahru, Toa Payoh, Ulu Pandan, Upper Serangoon	27.0%
