= 1st Legislative Assembly of Singapore =

Legislative Assembly of Singapore

←	Legislative Council	2nd Legislative Assembly	→
Composition at the start of the 1st Legislative Assembly of Singapore
PAP (3)
LF (12)
UMNO (1)
MCA (1)
MU (1)
Independent (3)
DP (2)
PP (4)
Appointed (7)

Overview
- Legislative body: Legislative Assembly of Singapore
- Meeting place: Old Parliament House, Singapore
- Term: 22 April 1955 – 31 March 1959
- Election: 22 April 1955
- Government: Labour Front (until 10 November 1958); Singapore People's Alliance (from 10 November 1958); United Malays National Organisation; Malayan Chinese Association; Malay Union (until 21 May 1957)
- Opposition: People's Action Party; Progressive Party (until 5 February 1956); Democratic Party (until 5 February 1956); Liberal Socialist Party (from 5 February 1956); Citizens' Party (from 25 February 1959)

Legislative Assembly of Singapore
- Members: 32
- Speaker: Sir George Oehlers
- Chief Secretary: William Goode
- Chief Minister: David Marshall (until 7 June 1956); Lim Yew Hock (from 8 June 1956)
- Party control: LF–UMNO–MCA–MU minority (until 21 May 1957); LF–UMNO–MCA minority (21 May 1957 – 10 November 1958); SPA–UMNO–MCA minority (from 10 November 1958)

Sessions
- 1st: 22 April 1955 – 7 June 1956
- 2nd: 29 August 1956 – 8 January 1958
- 3rd: 9 April 1958 – 19 March 1959

The 1st Legislative Assembly of Singapore was a meeting of the Legislative Assembly of Singapore from 22 April 1955 until 31 March 1959.

== Officeholders ==
- Speaker: Sir George Oehlers (Independent)
- Deputy Speaker: Richard Lim (Nominated member, LF (Note: Later affiliated with the Malayan Chinese Association.))
- Chief Minister:
  - David Marshall (Cairnhill, LF), until 7 June 1956
  - Lim Yew Hock (Havelock. LF (Note: Later affiliated with the Singapore People's Alliance.)), from 7 June 1956
- Deputy Chief Minister: Abdul Hamid Jumat (Ulu Bedok, UMNO), from 7 June 1956
- Leader of the Opposition: Lee Kuan Yew (Tanjong Pagar, PAP)

== Composition ==
Party	Members	
Party	At election	At dissolution
Labour Front	10	0
Progressive Party	4	0
People's Action Party	3	4
Democratic Party	2	0
Malayan Chinese Association	1	2
United Malays National Organisation	1	2
Malay Union	1	0
Singapore People's Alliance	0	11
Liberal Socialist Party	0	3
Citizens' Party	0	1
Independent	7	5
Ex-officio members	3	3
Vacant seats	0	1
Total	32	32
Government majority	–6	–1

== Members ==
Constituency	Member	Party
Bukit Panjang	Goh Tong Liang	Progressive Party (Note: Affiliated with the Liberal Socialist Party from 5 February 1956 until 3 December 1958, and with the Singapore People's Alliance from 3 December 1958.)
Bukit Timah	Lim Chin Siong	People's Action Party
Cairnhill	David Marshall (Note: David Marshall resigned on 29 April 1957.)	Labour Front (Note: Served as an independent from 17 April 1957.)
Cairnhill	Soh Ghee Soon (Note: Soh Ghee Soon was by-elected on 29 June 1957, to succeed David Marshall.)	Liberal Socialist Party (Note: Served as an independent from 13 November until 3 December 1958, then affiliated with the Singapore People's Alliance from 3 December 1958.)
Changi	Lim Cher Kheng	Democratic Party (Note: Affiliated with the Liberal Socialist Party from 5 February until 6 June 1956, then served as an independent from 6 June 1956.)
Farrer Park	A. R. Lazarous	Labour Front (Note: Became an independent on 12 June 1956.)
Geylang	Mak Pak Shee	Labour Front (Note: Affiliated with the Singapore People's Alliance from 10 November 1958.)
Havelock	Lim Yew Hock	Labour Front
Kampong Kapor	Seah Peng Chuan	Labour Front (Note: Served as an independent from 7 June 1956 until 25 February 1959, and affiliated with the Citizens' Party on 25 February 1959.)
Katong	A. J. Braga	Labour Front
Pasir Panjang	Wong Foo Nam	Malayan Chinese Association
Paya Lebar	Lim Koon Teck	Progressive Party
Punggol–Tampines	Goh Chew Chua	People's Action Party
Queenstown	Lee Choon Eng	Labour Front (Note: Served as an independent from 12 June 1956 until 12 December 1958, and affiliated with the Singapore People's Alliance from 12 December 1958.)
Rochore	Tan Theng Chiang	Labour Front
Sembawang	Ahmad Ibrahim	Independent (Note: Elected to the People's Action Party leadership on 4 August 1957.)
Seletar	M. P. D. Nair	Independent
Serangoon	Lim Choon Mong	Progressive Party
Southern Islands	Mohamed Sidik	Malay Union (Note: Affiliated with UMNO from 21 May 1957.)
Stamford	J. M. Jumabhoy	Labour Front
Tanglin	John Ede	Progressive Party (Note: Affiliated with the Liberal Socialist Party from 5 February 1956.)
Tanjong Pagar	Lee Kuan Yew (Note: Lee Kuan Yew resigned on 27 April 1957, but was later by-elected on 29 June 1957.)	People's Action Party
Telok Ayer	Rajabali Jumabhoy	Independent (Note: Affiliated with the Liberal Socialist Party on 6 February 1956.)
Tiong Bahru	William Tan	Democratic Party
Ulu Bedok	Abdul Hamid Jumat	UMNO
Whampoa	Chew Swee Kee (Note: Chew Swee Kee resigned on 3 March 1959.)	Labour Front
Chief Secretary	William Goode (Note: William Goode served as Chief Secretary until 9 December 1957.)	Nonpartisan
Chief Secretary	Edgeworth David (Note: Edgeworth David served as Chief Secretary from 29 January 1958.)	Nonpartisan
Attorney-General	John Davies (Note: John Davies served as Attorney-General until 5 September 1955.)	Nonpartisan
Attorney-General	Charles Harris Butterfield (Note: Charles Harris Butterfield served as Attorney-General from 6 September 1955 until 1 July 1957.)	Nonpartisan
Attorney-General	Ernest Pattison Shanks (Note: Ernest Pattison Shanks served as Attorney-General from 2 July 1957.)	Nonpartisan
Financial Secretary	Thomas Hart	Nonpartisan
Nominated members	Francis Thomas	Labour Front
Nominated members	Richard Lim	Labour Front (Note: Affiliated with the Malayan Chinese Association on 23 January 1959.)
Nominated members	G. A. P. Sutherland (Note: G. A. P. Sutherland resigned on 13 June 1958.)	Independent
Nominated members	Ong Piah Teng (Note: Ong Piah Teng died on 1 January 1958.)	Independent
Nominated members	J. M. Mason (Note: J. M. Mason was appointed on 8 July 1958, but later resigned on 15 December 1958.)	Independent
Nominated members	Ewen MacGregor Field Fergusson (Note: Ewen MacGregor Field Fergusson was appointed on 12 January 1959.)	Independent
