= List of Singaporean electoral divisions (1955–1959) =

The following is a list of Singaporean electoral divisions from 1955 to 1959 that served as constituencies that elected members to the 1st Legislative Assembly of Singapore in the 1955 Singaporean general elections. The number of seats had increased to 25 from 9 since the previous election in 1951.

== Constituencies ==
Constituency	Seats	Electorate
Bukit Panjang	1	8,012
Bukit Timah	1	9,173
Cairnhill	1	13,528
Changi	1	11,239
Farrer Park	1	12,242
Geylang	1	16,604
Havelock	1	12,835
Kampong Kapor	1	13,815
Katong	1	22,196
Pasir Panjang	1	13,812
Paya Lebar	1	12,817
Punggol–Tampines	1	6,628
Queenstown	1	7,015
Rochore	1	12,073
Sembawang	1	10,675
Seletar	1	9,402
Serangoon	1	8,402
Southern Islands	1	3,548
Stamford	1	13,207
Tanjong Pagar	1	13,430
Tanglin	1	16,177
Telok Ayer	1	11,547
Tiong Bahru	1	12,664
Ulu Bedok	1	16,903
Whampoa	1	12,345
