= 2nd Parliament of Singapore =

Singaporean parliamentary meeting

Second Parliament of Singapore
←	1st	3rd	→
- Initial composition Government: PAP (58)

Overview
- Legislative body: Parliament of Singapore
- Meeting place: Old Parliament House
- Term: 6 May 1968 – 16 August 1972 (4 years, 3 months and 10 days)
- Election: 13 April 1968
- Government: People's Action Party

Parliament of Singapore
- Members: 58
- Speaker: Punch Coomaraswamy (until 18 January 1970); Yeoh Ghim Seng (from 27 January 1970)
- Leader of the House: E. W. Barker
- Prime Minister: Lee Kuan Yew
- Party control: PAP supermajority

Sessions
- 1st: 6 May 1968 – 14 April 1971 (2 years, 11 months and 8 days)
- 2nd: 21 July 1971 – 16 August 1972 (1 year and 26 days)

The 2nd Parliament of Singapore was a meeting of the Parliament of Singapore. Its first session commenced on 6 May 1968 and was prorogued on 14 April 1971. It commenced its second session on 21 July 1971 and was dissolved on 16 August 1972.

The members of the Second Parliament were elected in the 1968 general election. The People's Action Party (PAP), led by Prime Minister Lee Kuan Yew and his Cabinet, controlled every seat in the legislature. During the first session, Punch Coomaraswamy handed over the speakership to Yeoh Ghim Seng.

The Second Parliament saw the resignations of five MPs on 30 March 1970, which was followed by a series of by-elections. The resignation of Chan Choy Siong left Parliament without any female MPs until the election of the Sixth Parliament in 1984.

== Results of the 1968 general election ==
Party	Votes	%	Seats	+/–
People's Action Party	65,812	86.72	58	▲9
Workers' Party	3,049	4.02	0	Steady
Independents	7,033	9.27	0	Steady
Total	75,894	100.00	58	▲7
Valid votes	75,894	97.36		
Invalid/blank votes	2,058	2.64		
Total votes	77,952	100.00		
Registered voters/turnout	759,367	91.83		
Source: Singapore Elections

== Officeholders ==
- Speaker:
  - Punch Coomaraswamy (Independent), until 18 January 1970
  - Yeoh Ghim Seng (Joo Chiat, PAP), from 27 January 1970
- Deputy Speaker: Yeoh Ghim Seng (Joo Chiat, PAP), until 26 January 1970
- Prime Minister: Lee Kuan Yew (Tanjong Pagar, PAP)
- Leader of the House: E. W. Barker (Tanglin, PAP)
- Government Party Whip: Sia Kah Hui (Upper Serangoon, PAP)

== Composition ==
Party	Members	
Party	At election	At dissolution
People's Action Party	58	58
Total	58	58
Government majority	58	58

== Members ==
Constituency	Member	Party
Alexandra	Wong Lin Ken 黄麟根	PAP
Aljunied	Mohamad Ghazali Ismail محمد غزالي إسماعيل	PAP
Anson	P. Govindaswamy பி. கோவிந்தசாமி	PAP
Bras Basah	Ho See Beng 何思明	PAP
Bukit Ho Swee	Seah Mui Kok 佘美国	PAP
Bukit Merah	Lim Guan Hoo 林源河	PAP
Bukit Panjang	P. Selvadurai பி. செல்வதுரை	PAP
Bukit Timah	Chor Yeok Eng 曹煜英	PAP
Cairnhill	Lim Kim San 林金山	PAP
Changi	Sim Boon Woo 沈文武	PAP
Chua Chu Kang	Tang See Chim 邓思沾	PAP
Crawford	Low Yong Nguan 刘永源	PAP
Delta	Chan Choy Siong (until 1970) (Note: Resigned on 30 March 1970 to make way for new talent.) 陈翠嫦	PAP
Delta	Yeo Choo Kok (from 1970) (Note: Elected on 18 April 1970 in the 1970 by-elections.) 杨子国	PAP
Farrer Park	Lee Chiaw Meng 李昭铭	PAP
Geylang East	Ho Cheng Choon 何振春	PAP
Geylang Serai	Rahmat Kenap رحمة كنڤ	PAP
Geylang West	Yong Nyuk Lin 杨玉麟	PAP
Havelock	Lim Soo Peng (until 1970) 林树炳	PAP
Havelock	Hon Sui Sen (from 1970) 韩瑞生	PAP
Hong Lim	Lee Khoon Choy 李炯才	PAP
Jalan Besar	Chan Chee Seng 陈志成	PAP
Jalan Kayu	Hwang Soo Jin 黄树人	PAP
Joo Chiat	Yeoh Ghim Seng 杨锦成	PAP
Jurong	Ho Kah Leong 何家良	PAP
Kallang	Abdul Aziz Karim عبد العزيز کریم	PAP
Kampong Chai Chee	Sha'ari Tadin سهااري تادين	PAP
Kampong Glam	S. Rajaratnam எஸ். ராஜரத்தினம்	PAP
Kampong Kapor	Lim Cheng Lock (until 1970) 林清禄	PAP
Kampong Kapor	Yeo Toon Chia (from 1970) 杨敦清	PAP
Kampong Kembangan	Ariff Suradi عارف سورادي	PAP
Kampong Ubi	Ya'acob Mohamed يعقوب محمد	PAP
Katong	J. F. Conceicao	PAP
Kreta Ayer	Goh Keng Swee 吴庆瑞	PAP
MacPherson	Chua Sian Chin 蔡善进	PAP
Moulmein	Lawrence Sia 谢坤祥	PAP
Mountbatten	Ng Yeow Chong 黄燿宗	PAP
Nee Soon	Ong Soo Chuan 王书泉	PAP
Pasir Panjang	Othman Wok عثمان ووك	PAP
Paya Lebar	Tay Boon Too 郑文滔	PAP
Potong Pasir	S. Ramaswamy எஸ். ராமசாமி	PAP
Punggol	Ng Kah Ting 黄嘉腾	PAP
Queenstown	Jek Yeun Thong 易润堂	PAP
River Valley	Low Guan Onn 刘源安	PAP
Rochore	Toh Chin Chye 杜进才	PAP
Sembawang	Teong Eng Siong 张永祥	PAP
Sepoy Lines	Wee Toon Boon 黄循文	PAP
Serangoon Gardens	L. P. Rodrigo	PAP
Siglap	Abdul Rahim Ishak عبد الرحيم إسحاق	PAP
Stamford	Fong Sip Chee 邝摄治	PAP
Tampines	Phua Bah Lee 潘峇厘	PAP
Tanglin	E. W. Barker	PAP
Tanjong Pagar	Lee Kuan Yew 李光耀	PAP
Telok Ayer	Ong Pang Boon 王邦文	PAP
Telok Blangah	N. Govindasamy என். கோவிந்தசாமி	PAP
Thomson	Ang Nam Piau 洪南标	PAP
Tiong Bahru	Ch'ng Jit Koon 庄日昆	PAP
Toa Payoh	Eric Cheong 张润志	PAP
Ulu Pandan	Lee Teck Him (until 1970) 李德欣	PAP
Ulu Pandan	Chiang Hai Ding (from 1970) 张泰澄	PAP
Upper Serangoon	Sia Kah Hui 谢嘉惠	PAP
Whampoa	Buang Omar Junid (until 1970) بواڠ عمر جنيد	PAP
Whampoa	Augustine Tan (from 1970) 陈惠兴	PAP
