= 1955 Singaporean general election =

- 2 April 1955

25 of the 32 seats in the Legislative Assembly 17 seats needed for a majority
- Registered: 300,199
- Turnout: 52.66% (▲0.61pp)
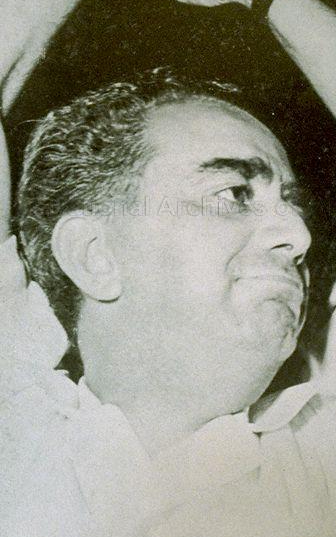

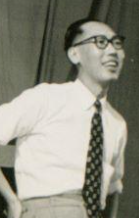

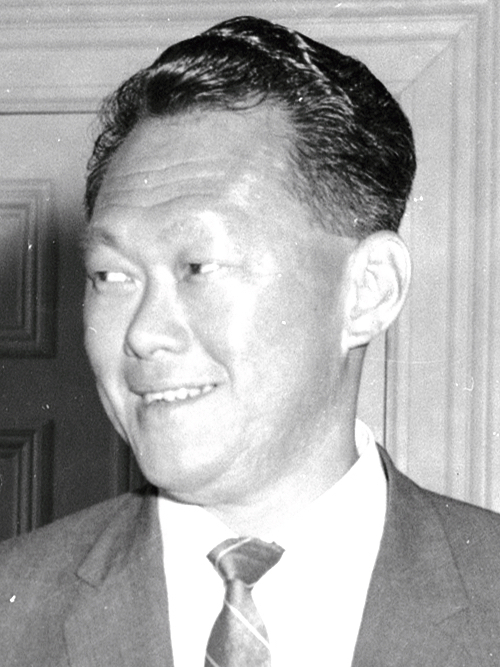

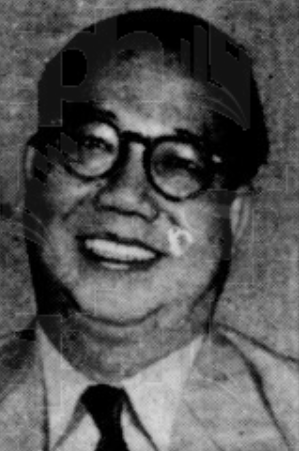

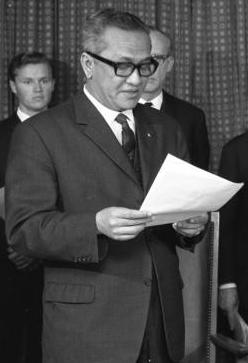

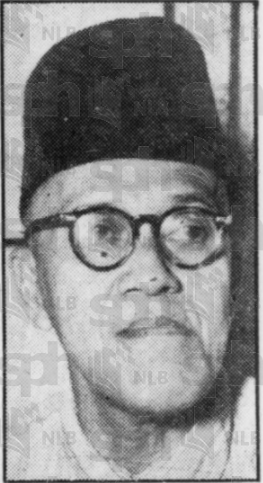
	First party	Second party	Third party
Leader	David Marshall	Tan Chye Cheng	Tan Ek Khoo
Party	LF	PP	DP
Leader's seat	Ran in Cairnhill (won)	Cairnhill (Note: Tan Chye Cheng represented Tanglin before the election.) (lost re-election)	Ran in Paya Lebar (lost)
Last election	Did not exist	45.37%, 6 seats	Did not exist
Seats won	10	4	2
Seat change	New	▼2	New
Popular vote	42,300	38,695	32,115
Percentage	27.06%	24.75%	20.54%
Swing	New	▼20.62%	New
	Fourth party	Fifth party	Sixth party
Leader	Lee Kuan Yew	Wong Foo Nam	Abdul Hamid Jumat
Party	PAP	MCA	UMNO
Leader's seat	Ran in Tanjong Pagar (won)	Ran in Pasir Panjang (won)	Ran in Ulu Bedok (won)
Last election	Did not exist	Did not contest	Did not contest
Seats won	3	1	1
Seat change	New	New	New
Popular vote	13,634	6,203	5,721
Percentage	8.72%	3.97%	3.66%
Swing	New	New	New
	Seventh party
Leader	Mohamed Sidik
Party	Malay Union
Leader's seat	Ran in Southern Islands (won)
Last election	Did not contest
Seats won	1
Seat change	New
Popular vote	1,233
Percentage	0.79%
Swing	New
- Results by constituency
Chief Minister before election
Position established
Chief Minister after election
David Marshall
LF

General elections were held in Singapore on 2 April 1955 to elect 25 members of the Legislative Assembly. It marked a pivotal moment in Singapore's political development, being the first election conducted under the Rendel Constitution, which introduced a significantly expanded legislature with a majority of elected seats. Of the 32 seats in the new Legislative Assembly, 25 were contested by election, while the remainder were filled by nominated or ex-officio members. The election featured multiple new political parties and was the first to witness widespread participation by locally founded political organisations.

The election resulted in a hung assembly, with the Labour Front (LF), a newly formed centre-left party led by David Marshall, emerging as the largest party with 10 seats. The People's Action Party (PAP), contesting its first general election under the leadership of Lee Kuan Yew, won 3 seats, while the Progressive Party (PP), the largest party in the previous Legislative Council, suffered a significant decline, securing only 4 seats. Marshall was appointed Singapore's first Chief Minister after forming a minority government with the support of the Singapore branches of the United Malays National Organisation (UMNO), the Malayan Chinese Association (MCA) and several independents.

The 1955 election was significant in setting the stage for the self-governance of Singapore. It introduced a partially elected government responsible for internal affairs, though the British colonial authorities retained control over external affairs, defence and internal security. With more than 300,000 registered voters, the 1955 election saw a significant surge in voter registration compared to the 1948 and 1951 elections. However, voter turnout remained relatively low at 52.66%. The outcome of the election saw a rising tide of anti-colonial sentiment.

== Background ==
Following the promulgation of the Rendel Constitution, the 1955 elections marked the first occasion in which a majority of the Legislative Assembly seats were filled by election rather than appointment by the British colonial authorities. The new constitution was drafted based on recommendations from a committee headed by George William Rendel, aimed at granting greater autonomy to local citizens.

Under the new constitutional framework, executive power was shared between local elected representatives and the British colonial administration, with the introduction of the position of Chief Minister, who would be selected from among the elected legislators. The number of elected seats was increased to 25, while the British government retained the authority to appoint the remaining seven members. For the first time, political parties were allowed to adopt a standard symbol for all their candidates, and independent candidates could choose their own symbols instead of relying on a ballot system.

Additionally, the Colonial Secretary were replaced by the Chief Secretary, who was granted the power to appoint four nominated Assembly members. Several seats were removed from the legislature, including those held by the Solicitor-General, two directors, two ex officio members, representatives of the three commercial organisations (Singapore, Chinese and Indian) and the City Council.

== Timeline ==
Date	Event
5 February	Dissolution of the Legislative Council
28 February	Nomination Day
2 April	Polling day
6 April	Inauguration of David Marshall as Chief Minister
7 April	Formation of Council of Ministers
22 April	Opening of 1st Legislative Assembly

== Changes in electoral boundaries ==
Constituency	Divisions formed from
Bukit Panjang	Bukit Timah & Seletar
Cairnhill	Balestier, Rochore & Tanglin
Farrer Park	Balestier
Geylang	Katong
Havelock	City, Keppel & Tanglin
Kampong Kapor	Rochore
Pasir Panjang	Bukit Timah & Keppel
Paya Lebar	Changi & Katong
Punggol–Tampines	Changi
Queenstown	Bukit Timah, Keppel & Tanglin
Sembawang	Bukit Timah & Seletar
Serangoon	Balestier, Changi & Seletar
Southern Islands	Bukit Timah & Keppel
Stamford	City & Rochore
Tanjong Pagar	City & Keppel
Telok Ayer	City
Tiong Bahru	Keppel
Ulu Bedok	Changi
Whampoa	Balestier

== Incumbents not standing for re-election ==
The following incumbent elected members of the Legislative Council did not run in the 1955 election.

Incumbent	Party	Constituency	Elected in
Ewen MacGregor Field Fergusson	Independent	Singapore Chamber of Commerce	1948
Tan Chin Tuan	Independent	Chinese Chamber of Commerce	1948

== Results ==
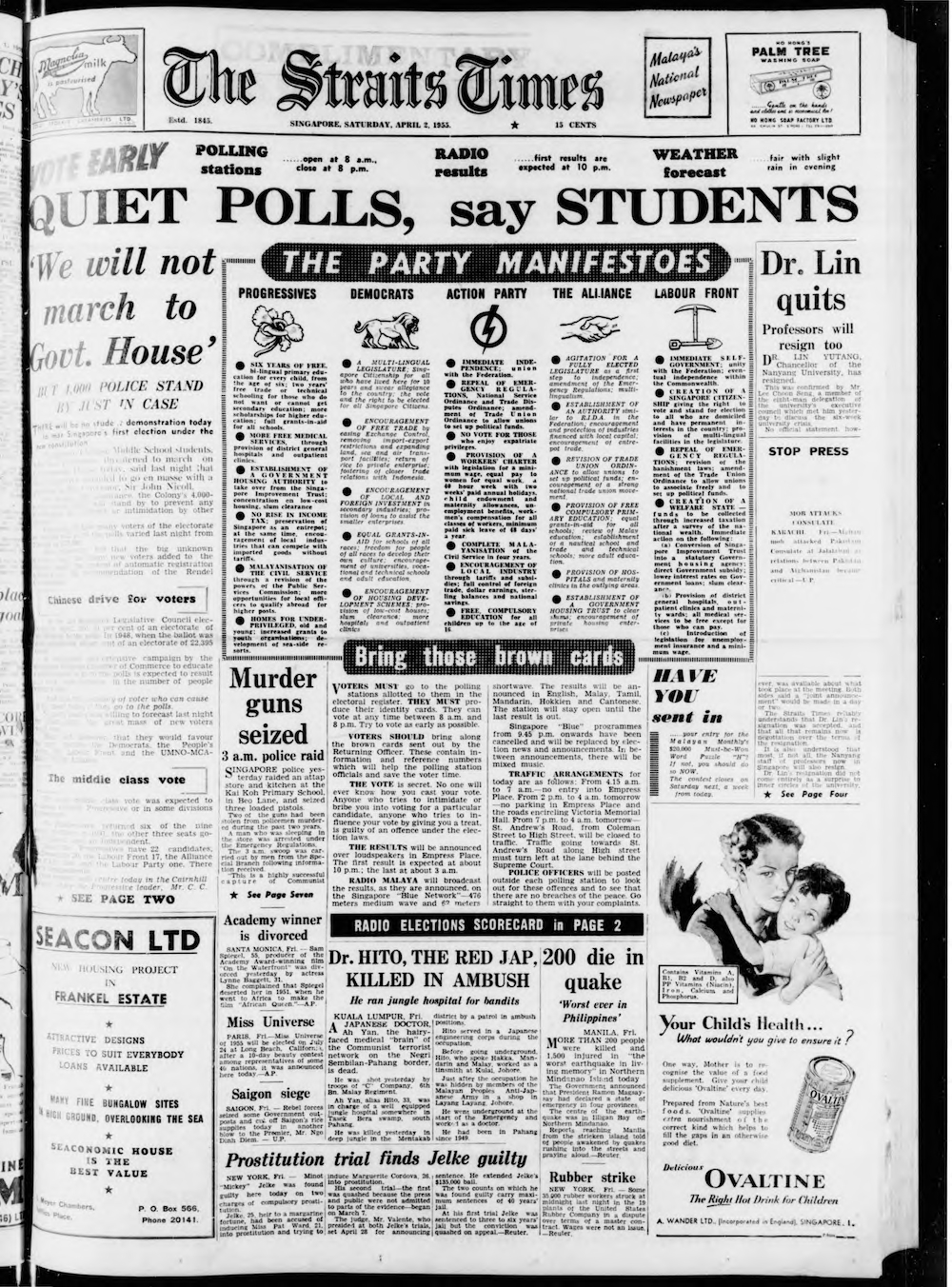
The Straits Times front page on election day

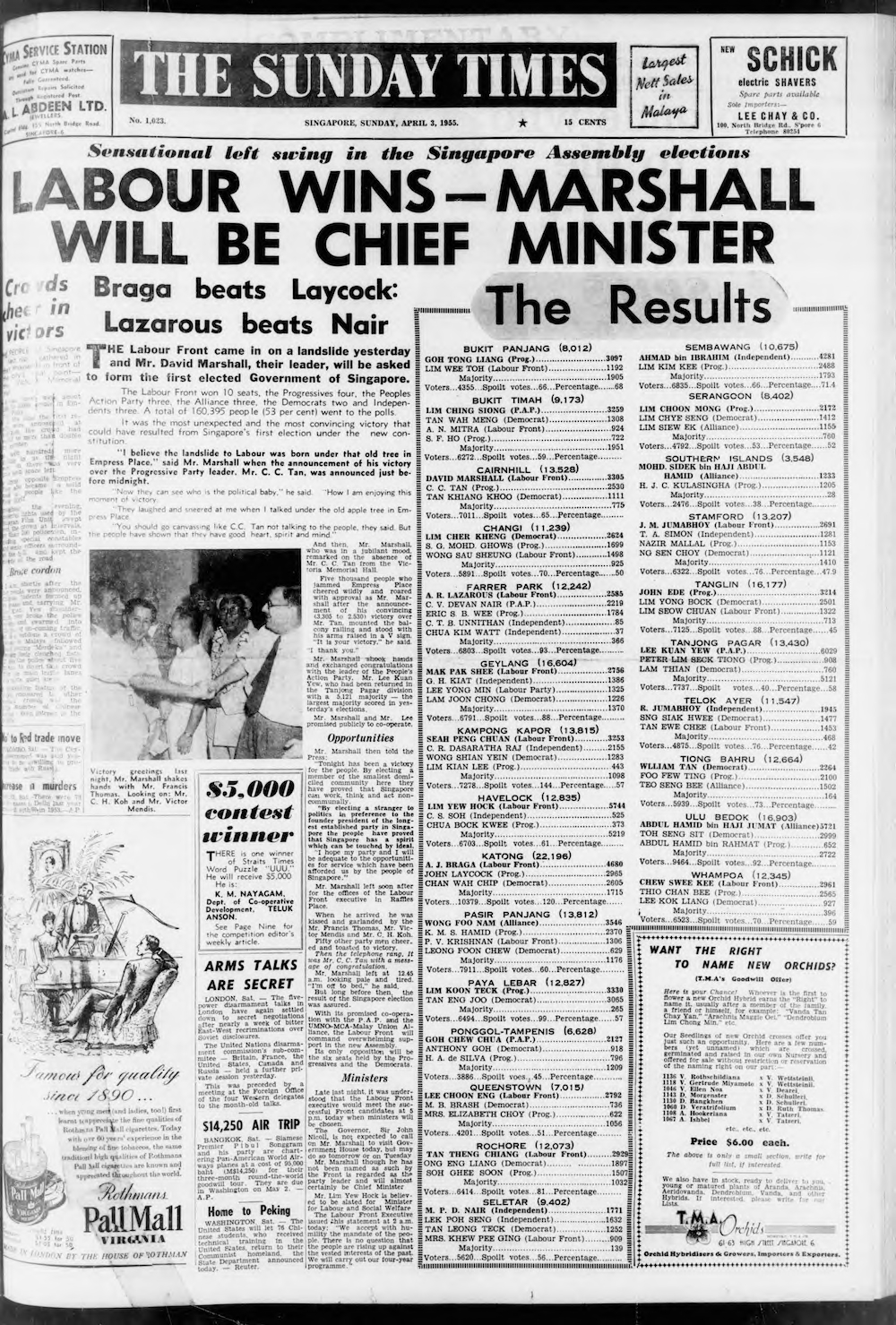
The Sunday Times the day after the election, reporting on the results and David Marshall's Labour Front victory.

Although many British observers had expected the Progressive Party (PP) to win the election and for its leader Tan Chye Cheng to be appointed Chief Minister, the outcome proved to be a major upset. The newly formed Labour Front (LF) emerged with the largest number of seats, and its chairman David Marshall was appointed instead after unseating Tan at Cairnhill. When including two nominated members aligned with the party, the LF held 12 seats. It subsequently formed a minority government with the Singapore branches of the United Malays National Organisation (UMNO) and the Malayan Chinese Association (MCA), each holding one seat, along with the support of the three ex-officio members of the Assembly, the Chief Secretary William Goode, Attorney-General John Davies and Financial Secretary Thomas Hart. This alliance commanded a slim majority of 17 out of 32 seats in the Assembly.

This election remains unique in Singapore's political history as the only general election to have resulted in a coalition government, the only occasion on which there was a hung legislature and the only time ever since that a ruling government was not formed by the People's Action Party (PAP). On the opposition side, the newly established PAP, led by lawyer and former PP election agent Lee Kuan Yew, deliberately contested only a limited number of constituencies as a protest against the Rendel Constitution.

As independent member Ahmad Ibrahim joined PAP following the election, PAP had 4 members in the Assembly and thus Lee became the new Leader of the Opposition. Lee won Tanjong Pagar with 78.33% of the votes, one of the highest margins in the election, and later remarked that he had also considered contesting Tanglin, but chose Tanjong Pagar due to its strong dockworker base and welfare networks.

Although the electorate had expanded more than sixfold compared to previous elections, this remained the last general election to date in which voting was not compulsory. Voter turnout increased only marginally to 52.66%, a rise of 0.61%. Southern Islands recorded the highest turnout at 70%, while six constituencies saw turnouts below 50%, with Geylang registering the lowest at 41%. In contrast, the lowest turnout in the 1951 election had been City, at 44%. This was also the last general election where no party contested every seat.

The best-performing candidate was Lim Yew Hock of the LF, a future Chief Minister, who secured 86% of the vote and won by a margin of 79 percentage points. At the other end of the spectrum, independent candidate Chua Kim Watt received just 0.55% of the vote in Farrer Park, making him the worst-performing candidate; it was also the worst-performing score in any election at the time of the election in Singaporean election's history for around seven decades until the 2025 election. The narrowest winning margin was recorded by Malay Union candidate Inche Sidik, who won by just 1.15 percentage points. Ten candidates forfeited their $500 election deposits after failing to secure the required vote threshold.

Popular vote
1. LF (27.1%)
2. PP (24.8%)
3. DP (20.5%)
4. Independents (9.66%)
5. PAP (8.72%)
6. MCA (3.97%)
7. UMNO (3.66%)
8. Others (1.64%)
Seats won
1. 10 seats (LF) (40.0%)
2. 4 seats (PP) (16.0%)
3. 3 seats (PAP) (12.0%)
4. 3 seats (Independents) (12.0%)
5. 2 seats (DP) (8.00%)
6. 1 seat (MU) (4.00%)
7. 1 seat (MCA) (4.00%)
8. 1 seat (UMNO) (4.00%)

Party	Votes	%	Seats	+/–
Labour Front	42,300	27.06	10	New
Progressive Party	38,695	24.75	4	–2
Democratic Party	32,115	20.54	2	New
People's Action Party	13,634	8.72	3	New
Malayan Chinese Association	6,203	3.97	1	New
United Malays National Organisation	5,721	3.66	1	New
Labour Party	1,325	0.85	0	–2
Malay Union	1,233	0.79	1	New
Independents	15,098	9.66	3	+2
Total	156,324	100.00	25	+16
Valid votes	156,324	98.89		
Invalid/blank votes	1,751	1.11		
Total votes	158,075	100.00		
Registered voters/turnout	300,199	52.66		
Source: Singapore Elections

Parties contested vote
Party	Votes
UMNO	61.04%
PAP	55.74%
Malay	50.57%
LF	38.73%
MCA	33.61%
Progressive	27.80%
Democratic	24.80%
Independent	24.00%
Labour	19.80%

=== By constituency ===
Constituency	Electorate	Party	Candidate	Votes	%	Swing	Margin
Bukit Panjang	8,012	Progressive Party	Goh Tong Liang	3,097	72.21	N/A	44.42
Bukit Panjang	8,012	Labour Front	Lim Wee Toh	1,192	27.79	N/A	44.42
Bukit Timah	9,173	People's Action Party	Lim Chin Siong	3,259	52.45	N/A	31.40
Bukit Timah	9,173	Democratic Party	Tan Wah Meng	1,308	21.05	N/A	31.40
Bukit Timah	9,173	Labour Front	A. N. Mitra	924	14.88	N/A	31.40
Bukit Timah	9,173	Progressive Party	S. F. Ho	722	11.62	▼45.53	31.40
Cairnhill	13,528	Labour Front	David Marshall	3,305	47.58	N/A	11.16
Cairnhill	13,528	Progressive Party	Tan Chye Cheng	2,530	36.42	N/A	11.16
Cairnhill	13,528	Democratic Party	Tan Khiang Khoo	1,111	16.00	N/A	11.16
Changi	11,239	Democratic Party	Lim Cher Kheng	2,624	45.08	N/A	15.89
Changi	11,239	Progressive Party	S. G. Mohamed Ghows	1,699	29.19	▼43.33	15.89
Changi	11,239	Labour Front	Wong Sau Sheung	1,498	25.73	N/A	15.89
Farrer Park	12,242	Labour Front	A. R. Lazarous	2,585	38.52	N/A	5.45
Farrer Park	12,242	People's Action Party	Devan Nair	2,219	33.07	N/A	5.45
Farrer Park	12,242	Progressive Party	Eric Wee Sian Beng	1,784	26.59	N/A	5.45
Farrer Park	12,242	Independent	C. T. B. Unnithan	85	1.27	N/A	5.45
Farrer Park	12,242	Independent	Chua Kim Watt	37	0.55	N/A	5.45
Geylang	16,604	Labour Front	Mak Pak Shee	2,756	41.17	N/A	20.46
Geylang	16,604	Independent	Goh Hood Kiat	1,386	20.71	N/A	20.46
Geylang	16,604	Labour Party	Lee Yong Min	1,325	19.80	N/A	20.46
Geylang	16,604	Democratic Party	Lam Joon Chong	1,226	18.32	N/A	20.46
Havelock	12,835	Labour Front	Lim Yew Hock	5,744	86.48	N/A	78.58
Havelock	12,835	Independent	C. S. Soh	525	7.90	N/A	78.58
Havelock	12,835	Progressive Party	Chua Bock Kwee	373	5.62	N/A	78.58
Kampong Kapor	13,815	Labour Front	Seah Peng Chuan	3,253	45.60	N/A	15.39
Kampong Kapor	13,815	Independent	Dasaratha Raj	2,155	30.21	N/A	15.39
Kampong Kapor	13,815	Democratic Party	Wong Shian Yein	1,283	17.98	N/A	15.39
Kampong Kapor	13,815	Progressive Party	Lim Kian Lee	443	6.21	N/A	15.39
Katong	22,196	Labour Front	A. J. Braga	4,680	45.66	N/A	16.73
Katong	22,196	Progressive Party	John Laycock	2,965	28.93	▼35.27	16.73
Katong	22,196	Democratic Party	Chan Wah Chip	2,605	25.41	N/A	16.73
Pasir Panjang	13,812	Malayan Chinese Association	Wong Foo Nam	3,546	45.17	N/A	14.98
Pasir Panjang	13,812	Progressive Party	K. M. S. Hamid	2,370	30.19	N/A	14.98
Pasir Panjang	13,812	Labour Front	P. V. Krishnan	1,306	16.63	N/A	14.98
Pasir Panjang	13,812	Democratic Party	Leong Foon Chew	629	8.01	N/A	14.98
Paya Lebar	12,827	Progressive Party	Lim Koon Teck	3,330	52.07	N/A	4.14
Paya Lebar	12,827	Democratic Party	Tan Eng Joo	3,065	47.93	N/A	4.14
Punggol–Tampines	6,628	People's Action Party	Goh Chew Chua	2,127	55.38	N/A	31.48
Punggol–Tampines	6,628	Democratic Party	Anthony Goh	918	23.90	N/A	31.48
Punggol–Tampines	6,628	Progressive Party	H. A. De Silva	796	20.72	N/A	31.48
Queenstown	7,015	Labour Front	Lee Choon Eng	2,792	67.28	N/A	49.55
Queenstown	7,015	Democratic Party	Murray Brash	736	17.73	N/A	49.55
Queenstown	7,015	Progressive Party	Elizabeth Choy	622	14.99	N/A	49.55
Rochore	12,073	Labour Front	Tan Theng Chiang	2,929	46.25	N/A	16.30
Rochore	12,073	Democratic Party	Ong Eng Lian	1,897	29.95	N/A	16.30
Rochore	12,073	Progressive Party	Soh Ghee Soon	1,507	23.80	▼19.32	16.30
Seletar	9,402	Independent	M. P. D. Nair	1,771	31.83	N/A	2.50
Seletar	9,402	Independent	Lek Poh Song	1,632	29.33	N/A	2.50
Seletar	9,402	Democratic Party	Tan Leong Teck	1,252	22.50	N/A	2.50
Seletar	9,402	Labour Front	Khew Pee Ging	909	16.34	N/A	2.50
Sembawang	10,675	Independent	Ahmad Ibrahim	4,281	63.24	N/A	26.48
Sembawang	10,675	Progressive Party	Lee Kim Kee	2,488	36.76	N/A	26.48
Serangoon	8,402	Progressive Party	Lim Choon Mong	2,172	45.83	N/A	16.03
Serangoon	8,402	Democratic Party	Lim Chye Seng	1,412	29.80	N/A	16.03
Serangoon	8,402	Malayan Chinese Association	Lim Siew Ek	1,155	24.37	N/A	16.03
Southern Islands	3,548	Malay Union	Mohamed Sidik	1,233	50.57	N/A	1.14
Southern Islands	3,548	Progressive Party	H. J. C. Kulasingha	1,205	49.43	N/A	1.14
Stamford	13,207	Labour Front	J. M. Jumabhoy	2,691	43.08	N/A	22.57
Stamford	13,207	Independent	T. A. Simon	1,281	20.51	N/A	22.57
Stamford	13,207	Progressive Party	Nazir Ahmad Mallal	1,153	18.46	N/A	22.57
Stamford	13,207	Democratic Party	Ng Sen Choy	1,121	17.95	N/A	22.57
Tanglin	16,177	Progressive Party	John Ede	3,214	45.67	▼34.47	10.13
Tanglin	16,177	Democratic Party	Lim Yong Bock	2,501	35.54	N/A	10.13
Tanglin	16,177	Labour Front	Lim Seow Chuan	1,322	18.79	N/A	10.13
Tanjong Pagar	13,430	People's Action Party	Lee Kuan Yew	6,029	78.33	N/A	66.53
Tanjong Pagar	13,430	Progressive Party	Lim Seck Tiong	908	11.80	N/A	66.53
Tanjong Pagar	13,430	Democratic Party	Lam Thian	760	9.87	N/A	66.53
Telok Ayer	11,547	Independent	Rajabali Jumabhoy	1,945	39.90	N/A	9.60
Telok Ayer	11,547	Democratic Party	Sng Siak Hwee	1,453	30.30	N/A	9.60
Telok Ayer	11,547	Labour Front	Tan Ewe Chee	1,660	29.80	N/A	9.60
Tiong Bahru	12,664	Democratic Party	William Tan	2,264	38.60	N/A	2.80
Tiong Bahru	12,664	Progressive Party	Foo Few Ting	2,100	35.80	N/A	2.80
Tiong Bahru	12,664	Malayan Chinese Association	Teo Seng Bee	1,502	25.60	N/A	2.80
Ulu Bedok	16,903	United Malays National Organisation	Abdul Hamid Jumat	5,721	61.04	N/A	29.04
Ulu Bedok	16,903	Democratic Party	Toh Seng Sit	2,999	32.00	N/A	29.04
Ulu Bedok	16,903	Progressive Party	A. Hamid Rahmat	652	6.96	N/A	29.04
Whampoa	12,345	Labour Front	Chew Swee Kee	2,961	45.88	N/A	6.13
Whampoa	12,345	Progressive Party	Thio Chan Bee	2,565	39.75	N/A	6.13
Whampoa	12,345	Democratic Party	Lee Kok Liang	927	14.37	N/A	6.13
Source: ELD, Singapore Elections

== Incumbents defeated ==
Incumbent		Constituency	Elected in	Winner	
Name	Party	Constituency	Elected in	Name	Party
Dasaratha Raj	Independent	Rochore (ran in Kampong Kapor)	1951	Seah Peng Chuan	LF
H. J. C. Kulasingha	PP	Bukit Timah (ran in Southern Islands)	1951	Mohamed Sidik	KM
John Laycock	PP	Katong	1948	A. J. Braga	LF
Nazir Ahmad Mallal	PP	City (ran in Stamford)	1948	J. M. Jumabhoy	LF
Tan Chye Cheng	PP	Tanglin (ran in Cairnhill)	1948	David Marshall	LF
Thio Chan Bee	PP	Balestier (ran in Whampoa)	1951	Chew Swee Kee	LF

== See also ==
- List of Singaporean electoral divisions (1955–59)
