= Changi Single Member Constituency =

Former electoral division in Singapore

Changi
- Former Single Member constituency for the Parliament of Singapore
- Region: East Region, Singapore
- Electorate: 24,886 (1991)

Former constituency
- Created: 1951
- Abolished: 1997
- Seats: 1
- Created from: Rural East
- Replaced by: East Coast GRC

Changi Single Member Constituency (SMC) was a former single member constituency in Singapore. It used to exist from 1951 to 1988 as Changi Constituency and was renamed as Changi SMC as part of Singapore's political reforms. It was abolished in 1997 and split between Aljunied Group Representation Constituency (GRC) and East Coast GRC.

== History ==
The constituency was formed in 1951 when Rural East Constituency was abolished and split into Changi and Seletar constituencies.

During the 1955 Singaporean general election, parts of the constituency were carved out to form the Paya Lebar, Punggol–Tampines, Serangoon and Ulu Bedok constituencies.

During the 1959 Singaporean general election, part of the constituency were carved out to form Siglap Constituency.

During the 1980 Singaporean general election, part of the constituency separated to form Tanah Merah Constituency.

In 1988, following the establishment of group representation constituency (GRC) and single member constituency (SMC), the constituency was known as Changi Single Member Constituency.

In 1991, where Changi had its final contest prior to the redrawing, Workers' Party then-chairman Tan Bin Seng narrowly lost the election at a 6% margin. Changi was originally planned to be contested by the party's future secretary-general Low Thia Khiang as his first choice, but Low instead chose Hougang SMC, and noted that Tan resides nearer to Changi, according to his 2024 interview.

The SMC was abolished in the 1997 Singaporean general election, and was redrawn between Aljunied GRC and East Coast GRC. The Changi division was not present since until the 2025 Singaporean general election where the Changi division reappeared, as part of the Pasir Ris–Changi GRC.

== Member of Parliament ==
Year	Member	Party
Formation
Legislative Council of Singapore
1951	Charles Joseph Pemberton Paglar	PP
Legislative Assembly of Singapore
1955	Lim Cher Kheng	DP
1959	Teo Hock Guan	PAP
1963	Sim Boon Woo	PAP
Parliament of Singapore
1968	Sim Boon Woo	PAP
1972	Sim Boon Woo	PAP
1976	Teo Chong Tee	PAP
1980	Teo Chong Tee	PAP
1984	Teo Chong Tee	PAP
1988	Teo Chong Tee	PAP
1991	Teo Chong Tee	PAP
Constituency abolished (1997)

== Electoral results ==
Note: The Elections Department does not include rejected votes when calculating the vote shares of candidates. Hence, all candidates' vote shares will total to 100% at any given election (may not appear so in multi-way contests due to rounding).

=== Elections in 1950s ===
General Election 1951: Changi
Party	Candidate	Votes	%
PP	Charles Joseph Pemberton Paglar	1,486	72.52
Labour Party	Syed Mohamed Abdul Hameed Chisty	563	27.48
Majority		923	45.04
Registered electors		3,623	
Total valid votes		2,049	97.9
Rejected ballots		44	2.1
Turnout		2,093	57.77
PP win (new seat)			

General Election 1955: Changi
Party	Candidate	Votes	%	±%
DP	Lim Cher Kheng	2,624	45.08	N/A
PP	S. G. Mohamed Ghows	1,699	29.19	N/A
LF	Wong Sau Sheung	1,498	25.73	N/A
Majority		925	15.89	▼29.15
Registered electors		11,239		▲210.21
Total valid votes		5,821	98.81	▲0.91
Rejected ballots		70	1.19	▼0.91
Turnout		5,891	52.42	▼5.35
DP gain from PP				

General Election 1959: Changi
Party	Candidate	Votes	%	±%
PAP	Teo Hock Guan	3,480	35.10	+35.10
UMNO	Abdul Rahman bin Mohamed Said	2,818	28.43	+28.43
Independent	Lim Cher Kheng	2,225	22.45	−22.63
LSP	Wee Tin Teck	1,024	10.33	−34.75
Malay Union	Fatimah Nor binte Golam Shawal	366	3.69	+3.69
Turnout		9,995	89.2	+36.8
PAP gain from DP		Swing	+35.10	

Note 1: In 1957, Singapore Malay Union (SMU) was expelled by its alliance partners consisted of UMNO and MCA for fielding a candidate in that by-election which was the reason for the elections department of Singapore to view Fatimah as another independent candidate.

Note 2: Lim Cher Kheng was the then incumbent seeking for another term. He represented the Democratic Party (Not to be confused with the Singapore Democratic Party, which was only formed after Singapore's independence.) which was dissolved by merging with Progressive Party (Singapore) as Liberal Socialist Party within a year from the 1955 General elections. With that consideration, the vote swing for both independent candidate Lim and Liberal Socialist Party candidate Wee will be taken from Lim's previous election result because that is the result for the candidate himself and his party respectively.

Note 3: UMNO, MCA and MIC together with Singapore People's Alliance was informally formed as an alliance in 1961, where it still within this term of election which was the reason for the elections department of Singapore to view Abdul Rahman as a candidate for Singapore Alliance.

=== Elections in 1960s ===
General Election 1963: Changi
Party	Candidate	Votes	%	±%
PAP	Sim Boon Woo	4,808	42.78	+7.68
BS	Siek Shing Min	3,425	30.48	+30.48
SA	Dato Syed Esa	1,975	17.57	−10.86
UPP	Abdullah Masood	935	8.32	+8.32
Independent	Yahya bin Mohammad Noor	95	0.85	+0.85
Turnout		11,343	95.6	+6.4
PAP hold		Swing	+7.68	

Note: One of the component party in Singapore Alliance is United Malays National Organisation (UMNO), and hence the swing will be based on its previous election of UMNO candidate.

General Election 1968: Changi
Party	Candidate	Votes	%	±%
PAP	Sim Boon Woo	Walkover		
Turnout		15,594		N/A
PAP hold		Swing		

=== Elections in 1970s ===
General Election 1972: Changi
Party	Candidate	Votes	%	±%
PAP	Sim Boon Woo	10,512	62.42	
WP	Normah Yahya	4,917	29.20	
United National Front	Omar Ninggal	1,412	8.38	
Turnout		17,159	93.8	N/A
PAP hold		Swing		

General Election 1976: Changi
Party	Candidate	Votes	%	±%
PAP	Teo Chong Tee	12,038	72.63	+10.21
WP	Zainal Abiden bin Mohamed Ali	4,537	27.37	−1.83
Turnout		16,968	95.2	−1.4
PAP hold		Swing	+10.21	

=== Elections in 1980s ===
General Election 1980: Changi
Party	Candidate	Votes	%	±%
PAP	Teo Chong Tee	Walkover		
Turnout		25,464		N/A
PAP hold		Swing		

General Election 1984: Changi
Party	Candidate	Votes	%	±%
PAP	Teo Chong Tee	12,195	65.75	
SUF	Sim Peng Kim	6,353	34.25	
Turnout		19,105	94.9	
PAP hold		Swing		

General Election 1988: Changi
Party	Candidate	Votes	%	±%
PAP	Teo Chong Tee	9,398	59.37	−6.38
WP	Chiam Yeow Juan	6,431	40.63	+40.63
Turnout		16,217	94.6	−0.3
PAP hold		Swing	-6.38	

=== Elections in 1990s ===
General Election 1991: Changi
Party	Candidate	Votes	%	±%
PAP	Teo Chong Tee	12,292	53.00	−6.37
WP	Tan Bin Seng	10,901	47.00	+6.37
Turnout		23,739	95.4	+0.8
PAP hold		Swing	-6.37	

== Historical maps ==
1955 General Election

== See also ==
- East Coast GRC
- Aljunied GRC
