= Tampines Constituency =

Historical constituency in Singapore

Tampines Constituency was a constituency in Tampines, Singapore. It was formed in 1959 when Punggol–Tampines Constituency was split into Punggol and Tampines constituencies. In 1988, the constituency was merged into Tampines Group Representation Constituency (GRC).

== History ==
In the 1955 general elections, this ward started as part of Punggol–Tampines Constituency which consisted of largely present-day Hougang, Pasir Ris, Punggol, Sengkang, Simei and Tampines. These were considered rural areas of Singapore and had a very low population (there were only 6,628 voters then, of which only 3,886 of them turned out to vote).

In 1959, prior to the 1959 general election, the Punggol–Tampines Constituency was split into two constituencies, Punggol and Tampines Constituencies. Tampines constituency took on significant portions of Ulu Bedok Constituency and part of the original of the Punggol–Tampines Constituency to become one of the larger wards in eastern Singapore.

From 1968, no significant changes were made to the constituency until 1984 when Simei and part of Tampines (which is south of Tampines Avenue 2) formed the new Changkat Constituency due to the growing population in the fast-development in Tampines New Town. From 1984 to 1988, this ward then only consisted of present-day Tampines and Pasir Ris. The ward only contain the residents committees in Tampines that is north of Tampines Avenue 2.

In 1988, the constituency was merged into Tampines Group Representation Constituency following the establishment of Group representation constituency (GRC) and Single Member Constituency (SMC).

== Member of Parliament ==
Election	Member	Party
Formation
Legislative Assembly of Singapore
1959	Goh Chew Chua	PAP
1963	Poh Ber Liak	BS
Parliament of Singapore
1967	Chew Chin Han	PAP
1968	Phua Bah Lee	PAP
1972	Phua Bah Lee	PAP
1976	Phua Bah Lee	PAP
1980	Phua Bah Lee	PAP
1984	Phua Bah Lee	PAP
Constituency abolished (1988)

== Electoral results ==
Note: The Elections Department does not include rejected votes when calculating the vote shares of candidates. Hence, all candidates' vote shares will total to 100% at any given election (may not appear so in multi-way contests due to rounding).

=== Elections in 1950s ===
General Election 1959: Tampines
Party	Candidate	Votes	%	±%
PAP	Goh Chew Chua	7,461	73.27	
SPA	Ong Phi Hok	2,041	20.04	
Independent	Lim Choo Ten	681	6.69	
Majority		5,420	53.3	
Turnout		10,334	90.1	
PAP win (new seat)				

=== Elections in 1960s ===
General Election 1963: Tampines
Party	Candidate	Votes	%	±%
BS	Poh Ber Liak	5,976	48.33	+48.33
PAP	Goh Chew Chua	3,601	29.13	−44.14
UPP	Liam Tian Seng	2,130	17.23	+17.23
SA	Lim Jew Kan	656	5.31	−14.73
Majority		2,375	19.2	−42.47
Turnout		12,486	95.0	+4.9
BS gain from PAP		Swing	-44.14	

Note: the Singapore People's Alliance (SPA) became part of the Singapore Alliance (SA) in the 1963 general election.

By-election 1967: Tampines
Party	Candidate	Votes	%	±%
PAP	Chew Chin Han	Walkover		
Majority				
Turnout		16,481		
PAP gain from BS		Swing		

General Election 1968: Tampines
Party	Candidate	Votes	%	±%
PAP	Phua Bah Lee	Walkover		
Majority				
Turnout		12,703		
PAP hold		Swing		

=== Elections in 1970s ===
General Election 1972: Tampines
Party	Candidate	Votes	%	±%
PAP	Phua Bah Lee	9,049	64.30	
PF	Tan Sim Hock	5,025	35.70	
Majority		4,024	28.60	
Turnout		14,510	94.8	
PAP hold		Swing	N/A	

General Election 1976: Tampines
Party	Candidate	Votes	%	±%
PAP	Phua Bah Lee	Walkover		
Majority				
Turnout		15,559		
PAP hold		Swing	N/A	

=== Elections in 1980s ===
General Election 1980: Tampines
Party	Candidate	Votes	%	±%
PAP	Phua Bah Lee	15,065	85.92	
United People's Front	Kasim bin Ibrahim	2,469	14.08	
Majority		12,596	71.84	
Turnout		18,108	95.4	
PAP hold		Swing	N/A	

General Election 1984: Tampines
Party	Candidate	Votes	%	±%
PAP	Phua Bah Lee	13,163	72.34	−13.58
United People's Front	Kasim bin Ibrahim	5,032	27.66	+13.58
Majority		8,131	44.68	−27.16
Turnout		19,060	97.0	+1.6
PAP hold		Swing	-13.58	

== See also ==
- Tampines GRC
- Tampines
