= Wong Foo Nam =

Singaporean politician and architect (1912–1980)

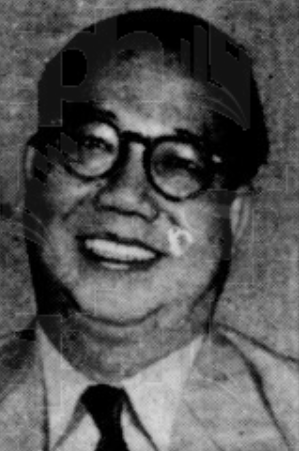
Wong in 1953

Wong Foo Nam (Chinese: 黄富南; 1912 – 22 May 1980) was a Singaporean politician and architect. A member of the Malayan Chinese Association, he sat on the Legislative Assembly of Singapore from 1955 to 1959. He was a member of the delegation sent to London for the second of the three Merdeka talks.

== Early life and education ==
Wong was born in Singapore in 1912. He studied at the St. Joseph's Institution and the Ling Yeong Chinese School. He also attended technical evening classes at Raffles Institution.

== Career ==
Wong was initially a member of the Institute of Architects of Malaya. He also sat on the institute's council. Wong designed 101 to 109 Holland Road, a row of semi-detached houses completed in 1939. In 1950, plans for the construction of a four-storey building with 14 flats on Moulmein Road, an 18-flat building in Meyer Road and another building on Napier Road, all of which were designed by Wong, were submitted to the local authorities. Plans were also submitted for a cinema on Kim Tian Road, also designed by Wong. However, they were rejected by the Economic Secretariat in August 1952 under the Buildings Restriction Ordinance after they had been accepted in March, a decision which he attempted to repeal. Wong became a member of the Joint Relief Organisation, formed to aid the victims of the 1951 Kampong Bugis fire, as an architect. He designed homes in Kolam Ayer to rehouse the victims. However, the 96 houses built were still not "ready for occupation" by July 1953 as the approach roads had yet to be completed. In March 1954, it was announced that the construction of the 1,200-seat theatre in Tiong Bahru, to be known as the King's Theatre, was underway. In the same year, he served as the architect for the extension of the Chung Khiaw Bank Building on Robinson Road.

=== Legislative Assembly (1955 – 1959) ===
In March 1955, it was announced that Wong would be contesting the Pasir Panjang seat in the upcoming general election as a member of the Alliance between the United Malays National Organisation (UMNO), the Malayan Chinese Association (MCA) and the Singapore Malay Union (SMU). By then, he had become a committee member of the Ning Yeung Wui Kuan, The China Society, the Hoi Thin Amateur Dramatic Association, the MCA, the working party for revision of City Council building by-laws and the building resources study group. His opponents in the election were businessman K. M. S. Hamid of the Progressive Party, contractor P. V. Krishnan of the Labour Front and merchant Leong Foon Chew of the Democratic Party. Wong won the election with 3,546 votes, 45.17% of the total votes cast. After the election, claimed to be "interested in promoting the cause of trade unionism and the welfare of workers in all ways possible." Wong was appointed to the Public Accounts Committee of the Legislative Assembly of Singapore, along with fellow assemblymen John Ede, Anthony Rebeiro Lazarous, Lim Cher Kheng and Mak Pak Shee. In July, he was made one of ten members of the committee established to oppose the Rendel Plan for a city and an island council. He stated in October that he was against government recognition of the Malayan Communist Party. Wong was elected the deputy president of the MCA in November. He later claimed in 1959 that he was offered a position as a minister shortly after winning the election and that he had declined this offer.

In January 1957, Wong became the chairman of the UMO-MCA-SMU Alliance in Singapore. He became a member of the All-Party delegation led by Lim Yew Hock and sent to the second of the three Merdeka talks, which was held in London in March. The talks held in March, following the failure of the first round of negotiations in April of the previous year, were constitutional talks aiming to "determine the terms of full internal self-government for Singapore." The talks held in March were deemed a "success". Of the talks, Wong stated: "Well done. We are happy that we have got what we wanted. We have been confident of our success because our demands were realistic." In April, he stated that he believed that the MCA should be "purged" of communists, as well as those who "showed sympathy to Communist China." In the following month, he demanded that the ten-year residential requirement for citizenship be reduced to eight years, in spite of the delegation agreeing to the ten-year residential requirement in March. Wong stated in July that the MCA was "determined to fight to the last" on the matter. The Singapore Citizenship Bill was amended by a select committee in October such that the residential requirement was reduced to eight years. In that year, Wong also represented Singapore at the Commonwealth Parliamentary Association conference, held in New Zealand.

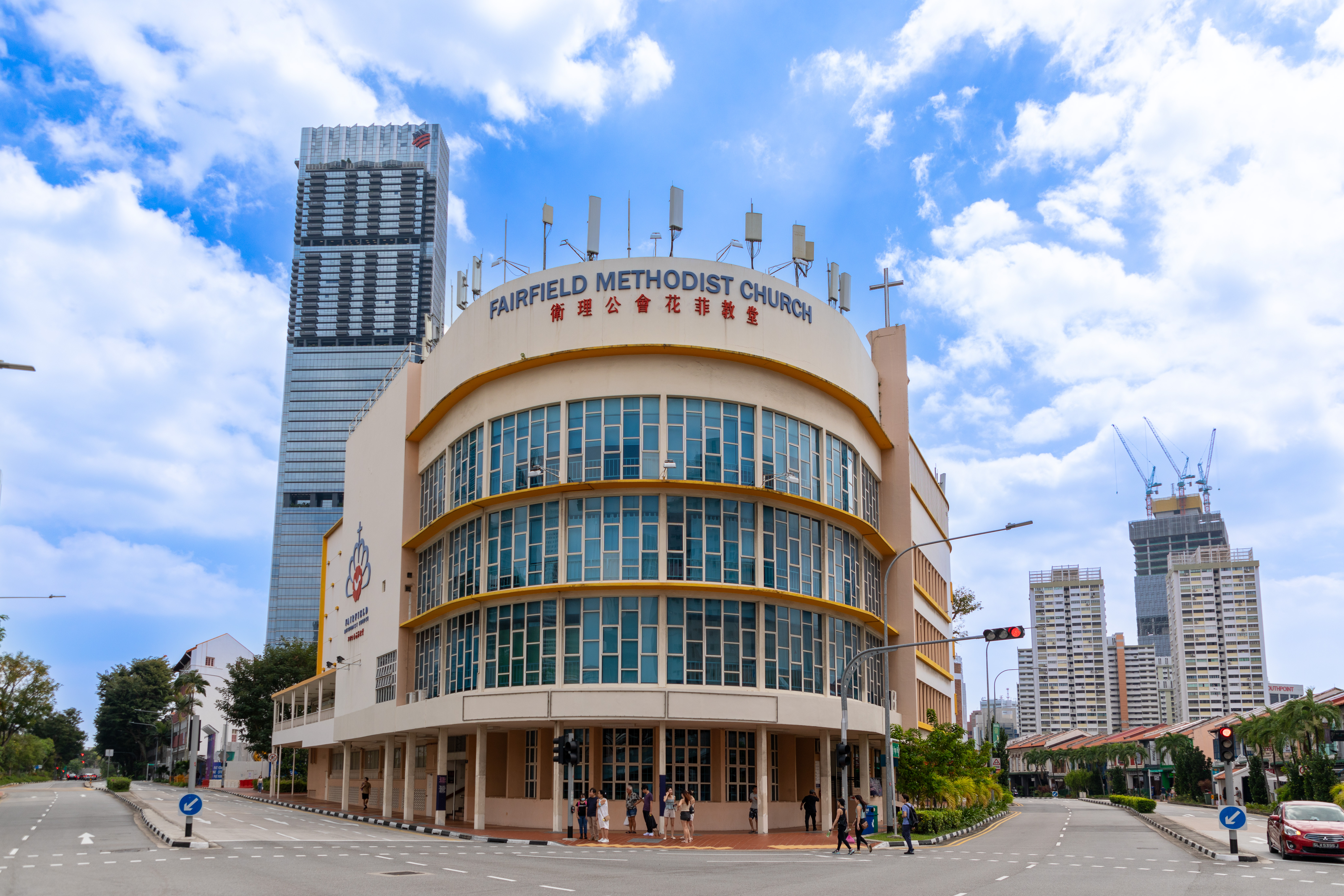
The former Metropole Theatre in 2024

By March 1958, Wong had been appointed the president of the Singapore branch of the MCA. In April, he became a member of the working party established to draft a constitution for the upcoming Society of Malayan Architects. The society was formed after a wave of mass resignations from the Institute of Architects of Malaya that occurred following accusations against the institution of using "high-handed and unconstitutional methods" of replacing an Asian honorary secretary with an expatriate. Later that month, Wong accused the Singapore Improvement Trust of corruption. He designed the Modern-style Metropole Theatre, which opened in June, according to the "form follows function" principle. The cinema, located at the junction of Tanjong Pagar Road and Maxwell Road, eventually became one of the "three famous cinemas" of Chinatown and an "important social and physical landmark." The building, converted into a church in the 1980s, has since been gazetted for conservation by the Urban Redevelopment Authority. Wong became a member of the first council of the Society of Malayan Architects. He was elected the society's treasurer in March 1959.

=== 1959 general election ===
In April 1959, it was announced that Wong would be contesting the Mountbatten Single Member Constituency in the 1959 Singaporean general election. By then, he had become a trustee of the Kwong Wai Shiu Hospital, the chairman of the Yeong Cheong Chinese School Board, the Hua Chiau School Board and the Boys Scouts' Pasir Panjang District Association. His opponents in the election were social worker Felice Leon-Soh of the Katong United Residents' Association, Tay Kum Sun of the People's Action Party, Seow Peck Leng of the Singapore People's Alliance, who was also a "social leader" and a former headmistress and Wee Soo Bee of the Liberal Socialist Party. He claimed in May that if the Alliance won the election, the merger of Singapore into the Federation of Malaya would be "made much easier." Wong lost the election, coming in third place behind Seow and Tay with 1,903 votes, 21.2% of the total votes cast.

== Personal life and death ==
Wong spoke English, Mandarin and Malay, as well as several Chinese dialects. He had three sons.

Wong died in hospital on 22 May 1980.
