= Fairfield Methodist Church =

Church in Chinatown, Singapore

Coordinates: 1°16′48″N 103°50′39″E

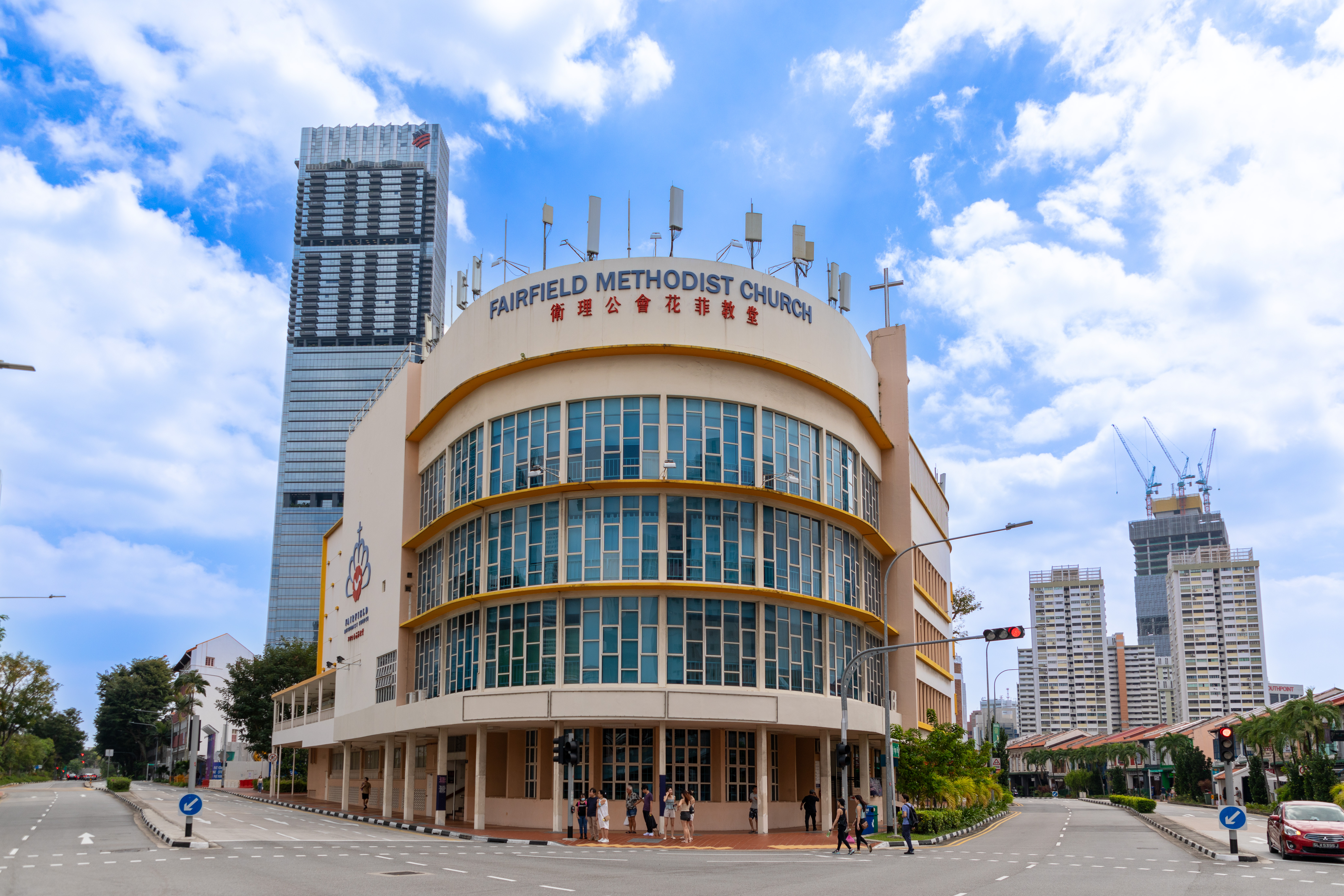
The building in 2024

Fairfield Methodist Church, formerly the Metropole Theatre or the Jing Hwa Cinema, is a building at the junction of Tanjong Pagar Road and Maxwell Road in Chinatown, Singapore. Formerly one of the "three famous cinemas" of Chinatown, it presently serves as a Methodist church.

== History ==
The $2,000,000 Metropole Theatre, which was owned by Ho Kai Yong, opened on 27 June 1958. The premiere show collected $16,000 for Nanyang University and the opening ceremony was attended by Hong Kong film actress Miranda Chen Chiang. The modern-style building was designed by local architect Wong Foo Nam in the "form follows function" principle. It features a curved façade glazed with floor-to-ceiling windows. It was the first cinema in Singapore to feature such windows, as well as a basement carpark. The cinema was known as one of the "three famous cinemas" of Chinatown, along with the Majestic Theatre and the Oriental Theatre. The cinema was also among the earliest in Singapore to feature air-conditioning. It also came to house the headquarters of Kong Ngee, a major film distribution company at the time.

In June 1985, the Fairfield Methodist Church announced that it had agreed to acquire the 1200-seat cinema, which had been put up for sale for several months, for $2.75 million. The cinema ceased operations in October of that year. In 1986, the Fairfield Methodist Church gave the building a $400,000 renovation, which was to be completed before the organisation moved in during May, to convert it into a church. This involved replacing the "Metropole Cinema" signage being replaced by a cross and its screen being replaced by an altar. An altar rail was also installed. However, much of the interior was left untouched.

The building was one of four post-World War II buildings in Singapore gazetted for conservation by the Urban Redevelopment Authority in September 2005 as part of its plan to "recognise certain post-war buildings which mark the era of independence for Singapore", along with the Church of the Blessed Sacrament, the National Archives of Singapore Building and the Jurong Town Hall. Among the reasons given for the building's conservation were its "unique" façade and its "character."
