= Tan Eng Joo =

Chinese businessman

Tan Eng Joo (Chinese: 陈永裕; Pe̍h-ōe-jī: Tân Éng-jū; 30 October 1919 – 29 October 2011) was a prominent businessman and leader of the Chinese community of Singapore.

== Early life and education ==
Tan was born in Singapore on 30 October 1919. His father, his third uncle and his sixth uncle, Tan Lark Sye, established Aik Hoe, a rubber re-milling and trading business. He attended the Anglo-Chinese School and completed his Senior Cambridge examination there in 1937. He began studying at the Massachusetts Institute of Technology in 1939 and obtained his Bachelor of Engineering from the university in 1943.

== Career ==
After graduating he worked at the National Defense Research Committee at Princeton University. He was then employed at the Timber Engineering Company as a researcher. Following the end of the Japanese occupation of Singapore, Tan returned to Singapore and became the managing director of Aik Hoe. He co-founded Union Limited with Lien Ying Chow, and established a factory that manufactured rubber belts and latex. He also established Alliance Plastics, a firm which produced lighting fixtures and signs. He was made the president of the Democratic Party as he could speak fluent English. However, the party lost in the 1955 Singaporean general election. In 1964, he founded the Rubber Association of Singapore allowing with Tan Lark Sye and rubber magnate Lee Kong Chian. In 1968, he was appointed the association's chairman. Following Lee's retirement, Tan took over his position, leading the group's international meetings. He helped establish the International Rubber Study Group, and served as the group's chairman. He also served as the director of Haw Par Corporation and Prima Limited.

He was elected the president of the Singapore Chinese Chamber of Commerce and Industry on 31 October 1989. He also served as the chamber's vice-president, and was later made an honorary chairman of the chamber. In 1991, he helped organise the inaugural World Chinese Entrepreneurs Convention in Singapore.

== Personal life and death ==
He married Yang Tai Ying and had three sons and four daughters.

Tan died on 29 October 2011.
