= Punggol Single Member Constituency =

Singapore electoral district

Punggol Single Member Constituency was a single member constituency in Punggol, Singapore. In 1959, Punggol Constituency was formed when Punggol–Tampines Constituency was split into Punggol Constituency and Tampines Constituency. The first MP was Ng Teng Kian followed by Ng Kah Ting, a veteran who served this area for seven terms making it one of the longest-serving backbenchers in the 1st Parliament of Singapore.

In 1988, part of the constituency was carved out to form Hougang Single Member Constituency. It was also renamed as Punggol Single Member Constituency (SMC) as part of Singapore's political reforms.

Ng retired from politics in 1991, after which the Punggol area has been redistributed to Cheng San Group Representation Constituency; at retirement, Ng was the second-longest serving MP among the members of the original Parliament, only behind Lee Kuan Yew who would continue to serve as MP for the Tanjong Pagar Group Representation Constituency (after his ward of Tanjong Pagar was redrawn into a GRC that same election) until his death in 2015.

== Member of Parliament ==
Year	Member of Parliament	Party
Formation
Legislative Assembly of Singapore
1959	Ng Teng Kian	PAP
1963	Ng Kah Ting	PAP
Parliament of Singapore
1968	Ng Kah Ting	PAP
1972	Ng Kah Ting	PAP
1976	Ng Kah Ting	PAP
1980	Ng Kah Ting	PAP
1984	Ng Kah Ting	PAP
1988	Ng Kah Ting	PAP
Constituency abolished (1991)

== Electoral results ==
Note: The Elections Department does not include rejected votes when calculating the vote shares of candidates. Hence, all candidates' vote shares will total to 100% at any given election (may not appear so in multi-way contests due to rounding).

=== Elections in 1950s ===
General Election 1959: Punggol
Party	Candidate	Votes	%	±%
PAP	Ng Teng Kian	4,072	46.39	
SPA	Tan Jin Hong	3,655	41.64	
LSP	Quah Heck Peck	554	6.31	
Independent	Tay Keng Hock	497	5.66	
Turnout		8,905	90.0	
PAP win (new seat)				

=== Elections in 1960s ===
General Election 1963: Punggol
Party	Candidate	Votes	%	±%
PAP	Ng Kah Ting	4,721	47.76	+1.37
BS	Koh Chit Kiang	2,860	28.93	+28.93
SA	Tan Jin Hong	1,320	13.35	−28.29
UPP	Lee Jiak Seck	984	9.96	+9.96
Turnout		9,944	96.6	+6.6
PAP hold		Swing	+1.37	

General Election 1968: Punggol
Party	Candidate	Votes	%	±%
PAP	Ng Kah Ting	Walkover		
Turnout		12,277		
PAP hold		Swing		

=== Elections in 1970s ===
General Election 1972: Punggol
Party	Candidate	Votes	%	±%
PAP	Ng Kah Ting	8,215	58.13	
Independent	Ng Teng Kian	5,917	41.87	
Turnout		14,461	94.5	
PAP hold		Swing		

General Election 1976: Punggol
Party	Candidate	Votes	%	±%
PAP	Ng Kah Ting	13,360	69.41	+11.28
WP	Tan Yong Sin	5,887	30.59	+30.59
Turnout		19,696	96.3	+1.8
PAP hold		Swing	+11.28	

=== Elections in 1980s ===
General Election 1980: Punggol
Party	Candidate	Votes	%	±%
PAP	Ng Kah Ting	17,103	78.86	+9.45
UF	Chua Nguan Key	4,585	21.14	+21.14
Turnout		22,497	96.4	+0.1
PAP hold		Swing	+9.45	

General Election 1984: Punggol
Party	Candidate	Votes	%	±%
PAP	Ng Kah Ting	14,904	65.09	−13.77
SUF	Sim Ah Leng	7,995	34.91	+13.77
Turnout		23,769	96.1	−0.3
PAP hold		Swing	-13.77	

General Election 1988: Punggol
Party	Candidate	Votes	%	±%
PAP	Ng Kah Ting	17,914	59.85	−5.24
SDP	Abdul Rasheed bin Abdul Kuthus	12,017	40.15	+40.15
Turnout		30,663	97.1	+1.0
PAP hold		Swing	-5.24	

== See also ==
- Punggol East SMC
- Pasir Ris–Punggol GRC
