= Serangoon Constituency =

Former Singaporean constituency

Serangoon
- Former constituency for the Legislative Council of Singapore
- Location of Serangoon in Singapore
- Region: Singapore
- Electorate: 8,402 (1955)

Former constituency
- Created: 1955
- Abolished: 1959
- Seats: 1
- Created from: Changi
- Replaced by: Serangoon Gardens; Thomson; Upper Serangoon

Serangoon was a constituency in Singapore from 1955 until 1959.

== History ==
In 1955, the constituency was formed from Changi Constituency. In 1959, the constituency was abolished and split into Serangoon Gardens, Thomson and Upper Serangoon constituencies.

== Member of Parliament ==
Year	Member of Parliament	Party
1955	Lim Choon Mong	PP

== Electoral results ==
Note: The Elections Department does not include rejected votes when calculating the vote shares of candidates. Hence, all candidates' vote shares will total to 100% at any given election (may not appear so in multi-way contests due to rounding).

=== Elections in 1950s ===
General Election 1955: Serangoon
Party	Candidate	Votes	%	±%
PP	Lim Choon Mong	2,172	45.83	
DP	Lim Chye Seng	1,412	29.80	
MCA	Lim Siew Ek	1,155	24.37	
Majority		760	16.0	
Turnout		4,792	57.0	
Registered electors		8,402		
PP win				
