= Phua Bah Lee =

Singaporean politician (1932–2021)

- 潘峇厘
- Phua in the 1970s

Member of the Singapore Parliament for Tampines
- In office 6 May 1968 – 17 August 1988

Personal details
- Born: Phua Bah Lee; 1932 Singapore, Straits Settlements
- Died: 26 December 2021 (aged 89) Singapore
- Party: People's Action Party
- Education: Nanyang University

Phua Bah Lee (Note: Chinese: 潘峇厘; Pe̍h-ōe-jī: Phoaⁿ Bâ-lî; pinyin: Pān Bālí) (1932 – 26 December 2021) was a Singaporean politician who was a member of the People's Action Party. He was Member of Parliament for Tampines constituency from 1968 to 1988. During his political career spanning twenty years, Phua was first appointed parliamentary secretary in the Ministry of Communications and later became senior parliamentary secretary in the Ministry of Defence. He was also the first president of the Singapore Armed Forces Reservist Association (SAFRA) from 1972 to 1989.

== Early life and education ==
Phua Bah Lee was born in 1932. After the war, he attended Nanyang University and graduated in 1959. He worked for eight years in the civil service and entered politics in 1968. The same year, he married Tan Cheok Tin.

== Political career ==
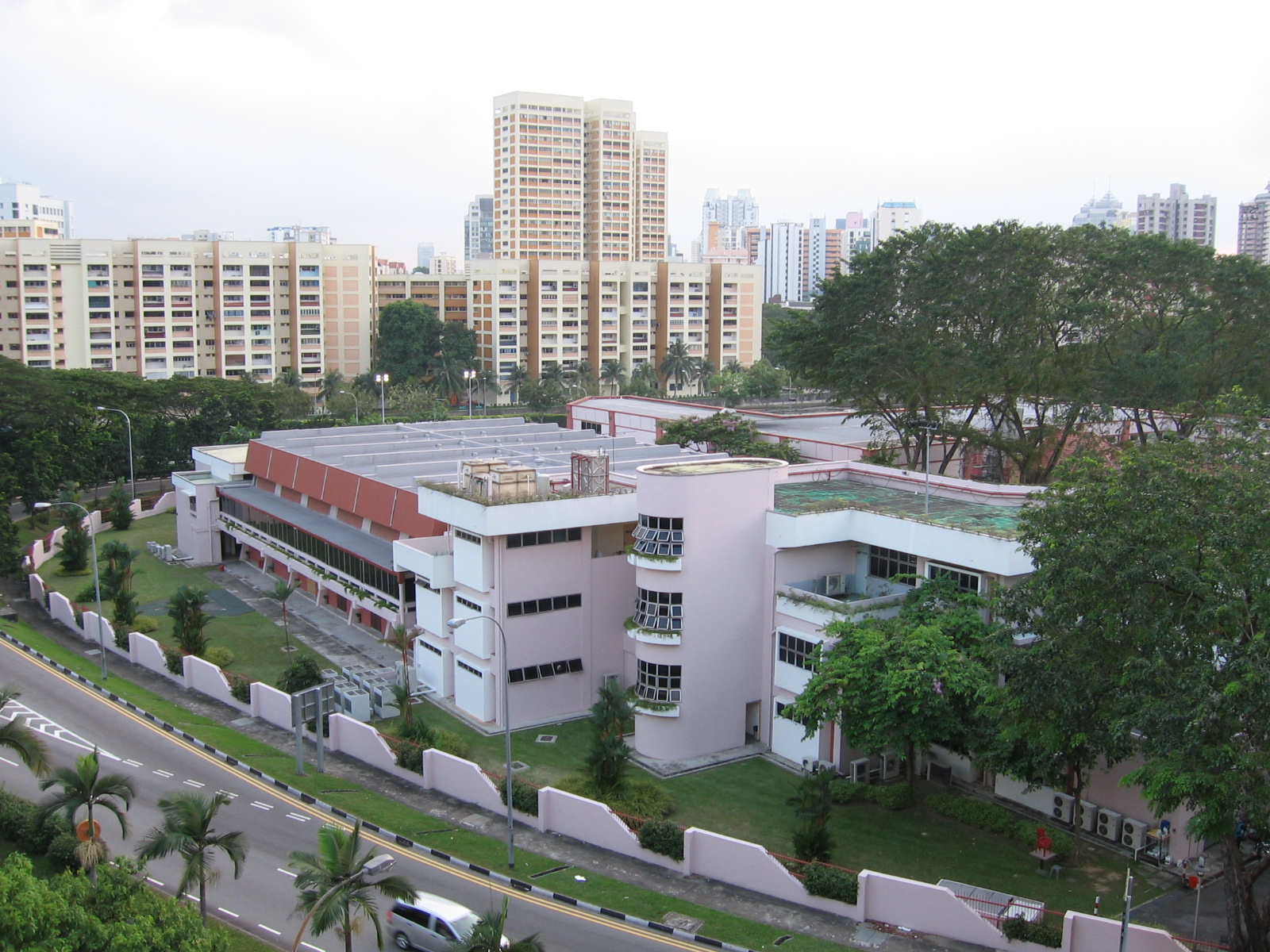
SAFRA Toa Payoh was opened in February 1975 under Phua's purview

=== Member of Parliament ===
He contested the 1968 general election as a People's Action Party (PAP) candidate in Tampines constituency and won the seat uncontested. He retained his seat in the 1972, 1976, 1980 and 1984 elections. As the Member of Parliament for Tampines, Phua was a significant contributor to the Tampines Chinese Temple unifying 13 former demolished temples. During the construction of Paya Lebar Airport, Phua assisted affected residents in finding new homes.

Phua stood in for Deputy Prime Minister Goh Keng Swee and Chiang Hai Ding in Kreta Ayer and Ulu Pandan constituencies respectively during their absences. Phua worked closely with Goh throughout his career.

=== Ministry of Communications ===
He was appointed parliamentary secretary in the Ministry of Communications and sworn in on 4 May 1968. As parliamentary secretary, Phua called for workers in the Port of Singapore to adapt to advances in the maritime industry. In an opening address to the inaugural Ecafe regional port seminar attended by 22 countries, Phua further urged the government to upgrade the port's facilities and operations. This was to avoid what he termed "a vicious circle" where progress was accompanied by a lack of skilled personnel.

In August 1968, Phua was appointed the first chairman of the Traffic Advisory Board and tasked with reducing traffic congestion. He commissioned Singapore's first radar training simulator at the Department of Civil Aviation in February 1969. In November 1970, Phua called for local artists to learn Western techniques "to raise the standard of art in Singapore". In 1971, Phua said "patriotism [was] important for prosperity" and also urged younger people to volunteer for community service.

=== Ministry of Defence ===
Phua was promoted to senior parliamentary secretary in the Ministry of Defence on 1 January 1972. On 12 March, Phua led a goodwill delegation of thirty-one Singaporeans to Malaysia in order to promote closer ties. He became the first president of the Singapore Armed Forces Reservist Association (SAFRA) in 1972 and was instrumental in the planning of its first three clubhouses, with the first opening on 19 February 1975. SAFRA instituted favorable policies for national servicemen under his leadership, including priority for Housing Development Board apartments. He retired from politics in 1988, opting not to contest that year's general election, and relinquished his presidency of SAFRA in 1989.

== Personal life and death ==
Phua was an opera enthusiast and actively engaged stars from Hong Kong, Taiwan and China to perform in Singapore. Phua also led the Basketball Association of Singapore and Kreta Ayer People's Theatre Management Committee. The National Trades Union Congress awarded Phua the Friend of Labour Medal in 1979. He was also a key contributor to Ngee Ann City, a shopping and commercial complex located at Orchard Road.

Following his retirement from politics, Phua became a member of the Singapore Institute of Directors and was on the board of 12 companies in 2019.

Phua died on 26 December 2021, at the age of 89. He was survived by his wife and three children.
