= Geylang Constituency =

Former electoral division in Singapore

Geylang
- Former constituency for the Legislative Assembly of Singapore
- Electorate: 16,604

Former constituency
- Created: 1955
- Abolished: 1959
- Created from: Katong
- Replaced by: Geylang East; Geylang West

Geylang was a constituency of the Legislative Assembly of Singapore. It came into existence in 1955 by the delimiting of the preceding Katong Constituency of the Legislative Council. The constituency was split into Geylang East and Geylang West at the next election, in 1959.

== Member of the Legislative Assembly ==
| Election | Member | Party |
|---|---|---|
| 1955 | Mak Pak Shee | LF |

== Electoral results ==
Note: The Elections Department does not include rejected votes when calculating the vote shares of candidates. Hence, all candidates' vote shares will total to 100% at any given election (may not appear so in multi-way contests due to rounding).

=== Elections in 1950s ===
General election 1955
| Party | Candidate | Votes | % |
|---|---|---|---|
| LF | Mak Pak Shee | 2,756 | 41.18 |
| Independent | Goh Hood Kiat | 1,386 | 20.71 |
| Labour Party | Lee Yong Min | 1,325 | 19.80 |
| DP | Lam Joon Chong | 1,226 | 18.31 |
| Majority | | 1,370 | 20.47 |
| Registered electors | | 16,604 | |
| Total valid votes | | 6,693 | 98.70 |
| Rejected ballots | | 88 | 1.30 |
| Turnout | | 6,781 | 40.84 |
| LF win (new seat) | | | |

== Historical maps ==
1955 General Election
