= Katong Constituency =

Former constituency in Singapore

Coordinates: 1.298°N 103.89°E

Katong
- Former constituency for the Parliament of Singapore
- Region: Singapore
- Electorate: 12,041 (1980)

Former constituency
- Created: 1968
- Abolished: 1984
- Seats: 1
- Created from: Mountbatten
- Replaced by: Joo Chiat; Mountbatten

Katong
- Former constituency for the Legislative Council of Singapore and the Legislative Assembly of Singapore
- Region: Singapore
- Electorate: 22,096 (1955)

Former constituency
- Created: 1951
- Abolished: 1959
- Seats: 1
- Created from: Municipal North–East
- Replaced by: Joo Chiat; Mountbatten; Siglap

Katong Constituency was a constituency in Singapore from 1951 until 1959 and from 1968 until 1984.

In 1951, the constituency was carved out from Municipal North–East Constituency and was represented in the Legislative Council from 1951 until 1955. In 1955, parts of the constituency was carved out to form Geylang and Paya Lebar constituencies but it remained represented in the Legislative Assembly of Singapore from 1955 until 1959 where it was abolished. The constituency was split into Joo Chiat, Mountbatten and Siglap constituencies. In 1968, the constituency was reformed by carving out from Mountbatten Constituency and lasted till 1984 where it was once again abolished and split into Joo Chiat and Mountbatten constituencies.

== Member of Parliament ==
Year	Member of Parliament	Party
Legislative Council of Singapore
1951	John Laycock	PP
Legislative Assembly of Singapore
1955	Armand Joseph Braga	LF
Constituency abolished (1959– 1968)
Parliament of Singapore
1968	Joseph Francis De Conceicao	PAP
1972	Joseph Francis De Conceicao	PAP
1976	Joseph Francis De Conceicao	PAP
1980	Joseph Francis De Conceicao	PAP

== Electoral results ==
Note: The Elections Department does not include rejected votes when calculating the vote shares of candidates. Hence, all candidates' vote shares will total to 100% at any given election (may not appear so in multi-way contests due to rounding).

=== Elections in 1950s ===
General Election 1951: Katong
Party	Candidate	Votes	%	±%
PP	John Laycock	2,075	64.2	
Independent	Goh Hood Kiat	1,157	35.8	
Majority		918	28.4	
Turnout		3,272	49.1	
PP win (new seat)				

General Election 1955: Katong
Party	Candidate	Votes	%	±%
LF	Armand Joseph Braga	4,680	45.66	
PP	John Laycock	2,965	28.93	▼35.3
DP	Chan Wah Chip	2,605	25.41	
Majority		1,715	16.73	
Turnout		10,370	46.9	▼2.2
LF gain from PP				

=== Elections in 1960s ===
General Election 1968: Katong
Party	Candidate	Votes	%	±%
PAP	Joseph Francis De Conceicao	Walkover		
Majority				
Turnout		14,872		
PAP win (new seat)				

=== Elections in 1970s ===
General Election 1972: Katong
Party	Candidate	Votes	%	±%
PAP	Joseph Francis De Conceicao	Walkover		
Majority				
Turnout		16,766		
PAP hold		Swing		

General Election 1976: Katong
Party	Candidate	Votes	%	±%
PAP	Joseph Francis De Conceicao	10,721	76.18	
SUF	William James Cook	3,353	23.82	
Majority		7,368	52.36	
Turnout		14,469	91.2	
PAP hold		Swing		

=== Elections in 1980s ===
General Election 1980: Katong
Party	Candidate	Votes	%	±%
PAP	Joseph Francis De Conceicao	Walkover		
Majority				
Turnout		12,041		
PAP hold		Swing		

== Historical maps ==
1955 General Election
