= Lim Koon Teck =

Singaporean lawyer and politician (1904–1984)

Lim Koon Teck (Chinese: 林坤德; 28 November 1904 – 29 October 1984) was a barrister-at-law, industrialist and politician in the Malaya and Singapore. He was the first Asian in the Straits Settlements to be appointed to the Colonial Legal Service. He was a magistrate at Penang and Crown Counsel, Singapore. After resigning government service, he joined the Lee Rubber Company. He was interested in introducing new construction methods, like lightweight concrete, to bring down building costs and was interested in helping to solve Singapore's housing shortage. These directed his commercial and political activities.

== Early life and education ==
Lim was born to a Teochew family on 28 November 1904, in a small terraced shophouse at St. Gregory's Place, off Hill Street, opposite the Armenian Church, in British Malayan Singapore, the eldest of the 14 children of Lim Boon-Seng, a cloth merchant, and Tan Gek-Neo.

Lim entered St. Andrews School, before he was eight years old, passing his Junior Cambridge in 1920 and his Senior Cambridge in 1922. Although Lim had done well academically, but his family did not have the means to afford him education overseas. Liau Chia-Heng (廖正興), a pepper merchant whom his father was friendly with at the Teochew Club, made a gift of $5,000 to help fund Lim's education abroad.

While Lim was interested to study architecture, the family had not enough fund for the six year education overseas, he decided to take up law instead. In June 1924 he passed the matriculation examination of London University and left for England by the Hakusan Maru on 19 August 1924, for law studies at the University College London.

Lim passed his intermediate examination for the LL.B in 1925. He graduated with honours, was called to the Bar at Middle Temple in July 1927, and proceeded to return to Singapore. Upon him qualifying as a barrister, his father moved the family to a rented house at 119 Emerald Hill Road, next-door to Seow Poh Leng, to reflect Lim's status.

== Career ==
=== Civil career ===
Lim had been strongly recommended by Sir Song Ong-Siang, who was very fond of him.

After returning to Singapore, Lim was called to the Singapore Bar and was appointed deputy registrar of the supreme court, Singapore in January 1928. He was offered $500 a month but was not given housing and transport allowances. He was appointed to the additional responsibility of Sheriff for Singapore in 1928 and 1929. His application to the Colonial Legal Service, however, was not approved.

Lim was appointed acting registrar during the absence on leave of Registrar W. A. N. Davies in December 1933, through 1935, and took on the added appointment of Sheriff in succession to D. F. J. Ess in August 1935. By 1936, Lim, who was by then Senior Deputy Registrar, was again appointed Acting Registrar of the Supreme Court in the Straits Settlements Civil Service, upon the departure of W. A. N. Davies and at this time it was thought that he would be eventually appointed Registrar.

Lim sat for and passed in Malay in August 1936, and was appointed Registrar of the Straits Settlements High Court in January 1937. He was then made Deputy Public Trustee, Singapore in the middle of 1937, and was then transferred to Penang to serve as Second Magistrate there. By January 1939 he was moved down to Third Magistrate.

In May 1940, Lim was transferred from his position as Third Police Magistrate in Penang to Malacca to act as District Judge and Registrar, Supreme Court. Lim's accommodation at Malacca is a large bungalow house at 1 Pringgit Hill, was just below the house of the Resident. The houses of all other civil servants were situated below Lim's and they were not happy with that. In July, it was announced that Lim that he would be transferred back to Penang. On 27 September, Lim resumed his duty as the Third Police Magistrate at Penang. In October, he was appointed Magistrate at Penang.

In 1941, Lim was promoted to Colonial Legal Service, the first Chinese in Malaya in the service.

After World War II was over and the British returned to Penang, the local government was reformed with the previous administration except for Lim. After reestablishment of the local government, the British Military Police took Lim away for investigations relating to collaboration with the Japanese. He was freed after about five hours in solitary confinement in an area usually reserved for condemned prisoners awaiting hanging. His wife, Betty, had called up a Judge, who in turn called the Chiefs of the Military Police and the British Military Administration. Lim put his case for wrongful imprisonment before a Judge who cleared him of all suspicion and praised him for having saved the lives of British soldiers.

There were not enough Public Prosecutors right after the Japanese Occupation and at one time there was an eight-month backlog of cases. Despite all that had been done to him and the way he had been treated in the past, Lim responded to the Government's appeal and voluntarily went back, on a part-time basis, working for about six months, as Crown Counsel or Public Prosecutor - he was paid half what full-time prosecutors got. But he did not accept the Attorney-General's invitation to return full-tile to the legal profession – even with the promise of the Solicitor-General's position a few years after rejoining, Lim could make $100,000 a year outside compared to, at most, $12,000 a year back in Government service.

He was member of The committee, appointed in April 1947 by Governor Sir Franklin Charles Gimson, to report on housing in Singapore and draw up a preliminary plan for building to relieve the housing shortage. The committee was chaired by C. W. A. Sennett (the then Commissioner of Lands and Chairman of the Singapore Rural Board). Other members of The Committee included E. C. Cooper representing the Singapore Chamber of Commerce, R. Jumabhoy representing the Indian Chamber of Commerce, S. I. O. Algasoff (Municipal Commissioner), and Teo Cheng-Tian. Lim represented the interests of the Singapore Chinese Chamber of Commerce. The Committee issued its report in August 1948. The committee's programmes for 1950–1953, were approved by Sir Patrick Abercrombie, British town planner. By June 1947 The committee had inspected possible sites for their $50,000,000 plan to re-house 50,000 low-income members of the population.

By December 1947 Lim was made deputy public prosecutor. He was then informed that he would be appointed Ipoh District judge, but, a month after that, still prejudiced against him being local, Lim was informed that he was being posted to Seremban as registrar of the high court, there, instead – the lowest post in the Malayan Civil Service. Lim objected. Lim wrote a letter of complaint for being sent to the lowest possible post despite all he had done to keep order in Penang, the lives he had saved, and his being cleared of all charges of collaboration. He also noted his ill-health. A copy of the letter was sent to the acting chief justice in Kuala Lumpur. In less than a week he received a letter putting him on early retirement at full pension, at just 42 years of age, which was unheard of. He provided the same testimony before the Malayanisation Commission in January 1956

=== Military career ===
Lim had joined the Volunteer Corps at the same time as he joined Government service in Singapore. While he started as a Private, owing to the high position he held, he was given special training and was promoted, in October 1929, to Second Lieutenant in charge of a Company of 40 men, just a month later. He was promoted to Lieutenant from 25 October 1932.

After World War II started in 1941, the British started withdrawing from Malaya. On 13 December 1941, fearing the very real possibility of execution for being a magistrate and an officer of the Straits Settlements Volunteer Corps “C” Company, Lim and his family prepared to board a ferry and leave with the rest of the troops only to be refused entry and told that the ferry was for "whites" only. After the departure of the British, Lim Cheng Ean and Lim cordoned off the main shopping and harbour districts in order to stop looting.

Before the British left, they asked Lim to stay back to keep law and order among the people, and to hand Penang over to the Japanese when the latter arrived.

As the Japanese army reached Penang, Lim Lim and his volunteers of Company “C” were to become the accepted backbone of law and order in the village of Ayer Itam. On 17 December 1941 Lim organised 80 members of "D" (Chinese) Company of the 3rd Battalion, Straits Settlements Volunteer Force (Penang and Province Wellesley Volunteer Corps) to look after 80,000 evacuees who had fled to Ayer Itam from George Town.

A Japanese Lieutenant with 10 men arrived from the mainland on a sampan. Lim approached the officer and handed over Penang to him. He was asked to take the Lieutenant around and he did so, taking him all over Ayer Itam, after which the officer, having observed that everything was peaceful, instructed Lim to carry on with his governance of the place which he did for about a month before the Japanese took complete control.

Three days after the Japanese had taken Penang Island, the prison superintendent approached Lim and informed him that almost 50 young English soldiers between 18 and 20 years of age, together with a few British residents from Penang Hill who had not heard of the invasion, were squeezed together in the prison, had not eaten in three days, and were dying. Lim approached the Japanese lieutenant whom he had handed over the island to, and pleaded their case. He was allowed to feed them and this he did out of the stores of food in the godowns controlled by his men. When the Japanese discovered that he was giving those prisoners more than vegetables, salt and rice – he had introduced a bit of pork bone that he got from the roadside market – they objected.

Lim then went to the Penang General Hospital for help and found a doctor, Dr. Evans, who had not evacuated. Dr. Evans suggested adding Bovril or some other meat stock into the soup for the British prisoners While it helped in their condition, they were still susceptible to disease. Lim spoke to his superior, a Japanese county court judge who had been made chief judge of the Northern part of the Malayan peninsula that the British prisoners were considered prisoners-of-war and should not receive the same treatment as criminals. They were then removed to Singapore two weeks after that.

The Japanese restarted the Magistrate court and Lim was offered to take up the post or be taken away by the Kempeitai. Lim took up the offer. Conditions in prison were so bad that Lim avoided sending people there, preferring to let them off with a warning and an extremely light sentence. The Japanese noticed this and after a few months he was replaced with a Malay who became magistrate. They made Lim the Civil District Judge in Penang with a jurisdiction of $500. As no cases of this nature happened, owing to the Japanese occupation, Lim had no cases to try for the rest of tenure at Penang.

=== Business career ===
When the Joint Malayan Committee on War Damage Compensation was put together in 1946, Lim was then elected by the Singapore Chinese Chamber of Commerce to represent Chinese mercantile interests on the committee. Lee Rubber had receipts of payments for all its premiums on its $15 million insured but the head of the committee did not want to do anything until all claims were in and so he sat on everything for a year while Lim scurried around getting hold of all the other directors of big companies in Singapore and have them prepare and submit their claims. Then Lim was sent to London to address the authorities there. He related his experience and a senior officer of Lloyd's was sent to Singapore to replace the head of the Claims Committee. All claims were settled within two months, the first being those of Lee Rubber, who recovered $13 million. It seems clear that Lee Rubber did not expect to have recovered this much. Lee Kong-Chian gave Lim $500,000 in appreciation for managing to recover as much as he had.

==== Champion of low-cost homes for low-income people ====
Lim often criticised Government spending where he felt it was excessive, was sympathetic to the plight of the less fortunate who struggled to have their own homes and encouraged savings among wage-earners. In November 1954, Singapore United Rubber Estates Limited and Sembawang Rubber Estate Limited, two Singapore rubber companies with a joint-multimillion-dollar plan to build low cost houses for sale to the public on installment, appointed Lim to be on their respective Boards of Directors in London. In March 1955 he said that his life's ambition was to build low-cost houses for low-salaried wage-earners. He was, at that time associated with two housing estates whose object was to build 2,000 to 3,000 houses for people with low incomes, and factories producing building materials. By the end of 1955, one of those, Phoo Yong Estate, off the sixth mile Bukit Timah Road, became home to 150 low income families. The houses in estate were priced at $6,000, $8,500 and $12,000. The estates were the property of Lee Kong Chian, to whom Lim was legal adviser. In 1952, he had demonstrated that low cost housing for low-income wage-earners was a very real possibility. By 15 November, over 1,500 people had come to see the block of four cheap "package" houses completed in 140 hours by 10 workers at cost of $2,000 each. Eace of these came with a bedroom, sitting room, store, kitchen and bathroom, and if wood were to be substituted for steel in the house frame, a lavatory could be added on for free. The estimated labour cost was $500, but, if he chose to, a homeowner could build it himself with the help of an experienced labourer. The estimated cost for installation of light and water was $300 and the amount of land needed was only 500 square feet.

==== Expanding Lee Kong Chian's business ====
Lim and Lee Kong Chian had served together at the Garden Club when the latter was president and the former a member of the Election and the Management committees. Lee was also associated with Lim's father-in-law, Seow Poh Leng, the two of them having been established businessmen and had served together as long-time members of the Singapore Chinese Chamber of Commerce, Chinese Association, Straits Settlements Association, Singapore Chinese Recreation Club, board of directors of the Singapore Chinese Girls' School, board of directors of the Overseas Chinese Banking Corporation Limited, founded earlier by Seow, Rotary Club, Chinese Swimming Club, and the Garden Club, where Lim also served. While working as the Deputy Registrar at Singapore, Lim got to know Lee.

After World War II, Lee who was in the United States during the war, stopped at Penang before proceeding to Singapore. Lee stayed a night at Penang and met Lim. He offered Lim a job as his lawyer which Lim accepted and returned to Singapore. While Lim was employed as a legal advisor, he was more of a personal assistant to Lee.

Initially Lim was occupied in attending to Lee's war claims as during the Japanese occupation, Lee Rubber's property had been seized by the Japanese for their own use. All Japanese property had then been held by the British to be used to pay out war damage compensation. After recovering $13 million out of the $15 million claimed, there was very little for Lim to do and Lee gave him a very free hand. Lim told Kong-Chian about pepper and how he would like to deal in pepper produce. As a result, Lim started the Lee Produce Company, a profitable venture, exporting produce to London.

Lim saw an opportunity in real-estate and soon spent most of his time acquiring property for Lee, including the Chequer's Hotel, purchased at 24 cents an acre. He attended auctions and bought mostly vacant land. Lim then became a director and took a closer interest in the company. Lim told Lee of his love for building houses, especially to help lowly-paid people like clerks, own their own homes. Kong-Chian told Lim that he had 50 acres across from Hume Industries on Bukit Timah Road that could be developed.

In 1949, with approval from Lee, Lim started a factory, on 50 acres of land at Elias Road, to manufacture concrete blocks. The factory turned out 1,000 special concrete blocks a day at a time when there was a shortage of bricks and homes. His objective was to help build more houses at prices within reach of the working man which he saw as the best way of solving the housing shortage problem. He helped solve problems of delays at the Singapore Improvement Trust's Tiong Bahru project caused by a brick shortage by supplying them with 2,000 light cellular concrete blocks.

Concrete block terraced houses were built on 25 acres and sold (without sewage) for $6,000 each, and semi-detached houses (with sewage) for $10,000. When the Salvation army approached Lim for help in building a Home for Boys he turned to Lee who agreed to give them the other 25 acres.

He bought land cheaply and when others had a genuine need, he would bring their plight to the attention of Lee. People knew that the way to get to Lee was through Lim. When the Government wanted land for a school adjacent to Chequer's Hotel, they approached Lim. Lee agreed and the school was named Lee Kuo Chuan School, after Lee's father. A few acres at the back of the hotel were sold to The Straits Times at $6 per square foot. And, 12 acres with some shophouses were acquired by Government at approximately $1 per square foot.

==== Bukit Sembawang Estates Limited ====
In 1968, Lim became chairman of newly formed Bukit Sembawang Estates Limited, listed on the Singapore Stock Exchange. The company's first year ended 31 March 1969 with a profit and after acquiring Bukit Sembawang Rubber Co. Ltd. of Britain. He served as chairman till his death.

Lim heard that Bukit Sembawang Rubber Estate had short-sold 500 acres to a syndicate for $3,000 an acre, the price the Admiralty and Air Force had paid the estate for much more land that was used for the Seletar Navy and Air bases. He knew that the price ought to have been at least double. He informed Lee who was dismayed. Lee had a lot of shares in Bukit Sembawang Estate. At his suggestion Lim went to London to address the Board of Directors there and was appointed a Director with a responsibility for Sales.

Lim's interest in taking up the Directorship with Sembawang Estate was to help people through the construction of low-cost housing. His first project involved 100 acres at Sembawang, Upper Thomson Road, entirely built under his supervision, and sold at prices below that being charged by the syndicate who had bought the land earlier (for Serangoon Gardens estate). between eight and nine hundred houses, selling for between eight and twelve thousand dollars, were sold.

Afterward, Lim proceeded to construct a residential estate along Yio Chu Kang Road called Mimosa Park. Again, the intention of developing this estate was to provide affordable housing. Lim wanted to ensure that low-income people could own houses and did not charge too high for them. The houses that he offered were normally 10-15 percent cheaper compared to houses developed by other developers.

==== Building Society of Malaya, Limited ====
Lim was a Director of the Building Society of Malaya, Limited, for a great many years. The Building Society of Malaya, formed in 1938 by S. H. Peck, closed down in 1942, when Singapore fell. The Society's slogan was, "Don't Pay Rent - Buy Your Own Home," and its closely mimicked the methods of British building societies. The Society was re-organised and reopened in August 1948. Lim, together with Lee Kong-Chian, W. Munro, and Ng Sen-Choy were associated with S. H. Peck, as Directors.

==== St. Andrew's School ====
In later years Lim would become the first Old Boy's representative on the Board of Governors of St. Andrew's School, Singapore. Lim Lim became the 8th president of the Saint Andrew's School Old Boys Association (SAOBA Home | St Andrew's Alumni) in 1952 and concentrated on raising funds for the School Building Project and on the promotion of sports among members of the OBA. The play Lady Precious Stream was hosted again by the SAOBA raising $15,615 for the School Building Fund.

=== Political career ===
Lim stood for elections for the City in 1949 under the Progressive Party, Paya Lebar in 1955 under the Progressive Party and Aljunied in 1962 under the Singapore Alliance.

Lim's interest in the welfare of the people led him to look more closely at the subject of the new independence. He joined the Progressive Party and was made candidate for Paya Lebar Constituency. Lim had wanted to contest Tanglin Constituency, where he lived, but party leaders thought that was too easy. Most of the labourers and working-class lived there. So Lim did not mind and agreed to this.

In December 1958, Lim took his seat on the benches of the Singapore People's Alliance in the Legislative Assembly. Taking up his new seat he showed that his position, however, had not changed, when he made a call, in the Legislative Assembly, for the Government to help lower income groups in need of housing, proposing that Government start a 'revolving fund' of $1,000,000 to buy land and sell cheaply as building sites, the proceeds of which could be recycled indefinitely.

During the nomination day for the 1959 general election, Lim's nomination to contest Aljunied Constituency was rejected by an assistant returning officer. People's Action Party's candidate S. V. Lingam had objected to the nomination of Lim as the serial number of Lim's proposer was not filled in on the duplicate of the nomination forms. Lim decided to appeal against the objection with an elections petition. As the electoral petition can only be filed after the elections are held, Lim finally decided not to file the petition as he did not wish the electorate of the constituency to have a by-election so soon after the general election, if his petition was successful. Lingam won the election.

==== Independence movement ====
In 1955 a commission to inquire into the Malayanisation of the public services was set up under the Inquiry Commissions Ordinance, 1941. Lim appeared before the commission and told them of how he retired from service in disappointment. While he had applied to join the Colonial Legal Service in 1936, it was only four years later (1940) that he was told he had been appointed. He informed The Commission that he was acting Registrar of the Supreme Court, Singapore, in 1936, when he applied to join the Colonial Legal Service, and was only told he had been appointed to that service four years later, in 1940. At that time the post given to him was one specially created for him – Registrar, Civil District Court, which was lower than the post he had when he first joined the service four years earlier. Then the war occurred, and after liberation he was informed that he would be appointed district judge, Ipoh, but a month later he was told that he was to proceed to Seremban as registrar of the high court there. This, he told the commission, was "too much," and he retired from the service in 1946. He was also a member of the Singapore delegation in the Rahman–Marshall talks in 1955.

In April 1956 Lim, representing the Liberal Socialist party accompanied Chief Minister David Marshall to London for the first Malayan Independence or Merdeka Constitutional Talks at Lancaster House. Included in the delegation were Minister for Labour Lim Yew Hock, Minister for Local Government Abdul Hamid bin Haji Jumat, Minister for Health A. J. Braga, Minister for Commerce and Industry J. M. Jumabhoy, Wong Foo-Nam, and Seah Peng-Chuan (other members of the coalition government), William Tan, Lim Choon Mong, and Lim Cher Keng (Liberal Socialists), Lee Kuan Yew, and Lim Chin Siong (People's Action Party).

Lim was also one of a select few included in Singapore's Merdeka Mission to London in 1957. There were five delegates – three from the Coalition Government and one each from the Liberal Socialist Party and the People's Action Party. The delegation of five was made up of the Chief Minister, Lim Yew Hock, the Minister for Education, Chew Swee Kee, the Assistant Minister for Education, Sidek bin Haji Abdul Hamid and the PAP leader, Lee Kuan Yew and himself.

== Other official roles ==
=== Corporate directorships ===
- Director, Lee Rubber
- Director, Lee Engineers
- Director, Chinese Bankers Trust Co.
- Director, Hume Industries (Far East) Limited, in 1967
- Director, British and Malayan Trustees Limited
- Director of Singapore Land and Investment Company Limited

== Non-corporate roles ==
- Vice-president and patron, Singapore Arts Theatre.
- Fund-raiser, University of Malaya Endowment Fund.
- Chairman, Committee of Approval regarding evictions from premises belonging to the Singapore Improvement Trust.
- Member, Board of Management of St. Andrew's Mission Hospital.
- Founding member, Singapore's Safety First Committee.
- Member, Elections Committee and Management Committee of the Garden Club.

== Death ==
Lim Koon Teck died on 29 October 1984 at the age of 80 years, leaving behind his wife Betty (née Seow Guat Beng), two daughters (Mrs. William Turnbull née Lim Cheng-Kim, Penny Lim Cheng-Sim), and three grandchildren. On 31 October 1984 his body was moved from his residence at 5 Balmoral Road to Mount Vernon Crematoria.

== Sources ==
1. Supreme Court, Singapore, on the eve of Their Lordships on furlough Reference BAM 2/5 created by Paul & Co Covering Dates 28 Mar. 1928
2. Blood on the Golden Sands by Lim Kean Siew (Pelanduk)
3. Forgotten Armies – The Fall of British Asia 1941–1945 by Christopher Bayly and Tim Harper (Allen Lane 2004)
4. Photograph collection of the British Association of Malaysia and Singapore, Supreme Court, Singapore, on the eve of Their Lordships on furlough, Reference BAM 2/5 by Paul and Co 28 Mar. 1928—A group portrait showing the members and staff of the Supreme Court. The figures in the group are: W. Piyanage, Secretary to Puisne Judge; Chin Yong Lock, Chinese interpreter; G.V. ROWE, Indian interpreter; Yeo Tiang Swee, Senior Chinese interpreter; Henry Auguster Forrer (1886–1969), Malayan Civil Service 1909–, Registrar; Sir George Campbell Deane (1873–1948), Puisne Judge, Straits Settlements 1924–1929; Sir James William Murison (1872–1945), Chief Justice, Straits Settlements, 1925–1933; Bertram Reginald Whitehouse (1891–), Malayan Civil Service 1915–1935, Deputy Registrar; Lim Lim, Deputy Registrar; C.W. Chelappa, Secretary to Chief Justice; L. Naturajan, Indian interpreter.
5. Thanks to Lim Lim — letter to ed., Utusan Melayu, 9 December 1955
6. Only Five Will Go to London, Straits Times, 20th Feb 1957
