= Punggol–Tampines Constituency =

Singapore electoral district

Punggol–Tampines
- Former constituency for the Legislative Assembly of Singapore
- Region: Singapore

Former constituency
- Created: 1955
- Abolished: 1959
- Seats: 1
- Replaced by: Punggol Constituency and Tampines Constituency

Punggol–Tampines Constituency was a constituency in Singapore, covering parts of Tampines and Punggol, that existed from 1955 to 1959.

== History ==
The ward was formed in 1955, consisting largely of present-day Hougang, Pasir Ris, Punggol, Sengkang, Simei and Tampines. This north-eastern area of Singapore was considered rural and some of the least populated. At that time, there were only 6,628 voters in the constituency, of which only 3,886 turned out to vote.

In the 1959 election, this ward was split into Punggol Constituency and Tampines Constituency. Present-day Hougang, Punggol and Sengkang were carved out as part of Punggol Constituency. Tampines Constituency, on the other hand, absorbed significant parts of the former Ulu Bedok Constituency, becoming one of the larger wards in eastern Singapore. At that point, Tampines Constituency encompassed all of present-day Bedok (excluding Kampong Chai Chee, which belonged to Kampong Kembangan Constituency), along with Pasir Ris, Simei and Tampines.

== Member of the Legislative Assembly ==
Year	Member	Party
Formation
1955	Goh Chew Chua	PAP
Constituency abolished (1959)

== Electoral results ==
Note: The Elections Department does not include rejected votes when calculating the vote shares of candidates. Hence, all candidates' vote shares will total to 100% at any given election (may not appear so in multi-way contests due to rounding).

=== Elections in 1950s ===
General Election 1955
Party	Candidate	Votes	%
PAP	Goh Chew Chua	2,127	55.38
DP	Anthony Goh	918	23.90
PP	H. A. De Silva	796	20.72
Majority		1,209	31.48
Total valid votes			
Rejected ballots			
Turnout		3,886	58.6
Registered electors			
PAP win (new seat)			
