= Ewen MacGregor Field Fergusson =

British industrialist (1897–1974)

Sir Ewen MacGregor Field Fergusson
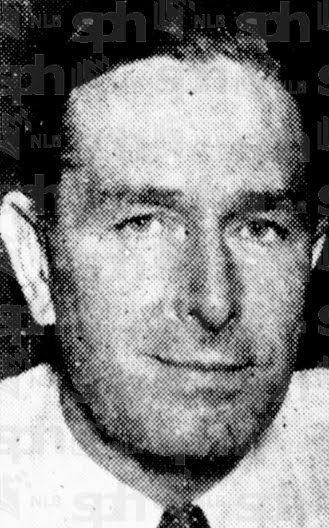
- Born: 16 October 1897; Scotland
- Died: 24 October 1974 (aged 77)
- Occupation: Industrialist in the tin industry
- Children: 3 including Sir Ewen Alastair John Fergusson

Sir Ewen MacGregor Field Fergusson (16 October 1897 – 24 October 1974) was a British industrialist involved in the tin industry who served as chairman and managing director of Straits Trading Company. Based in Malaya, the company was the world's largest tin smelting company during the first half of the twentieth century.

== Early life and education ==
Fergusson was born in Scotland on 16 October 1897. He was educated at Coatbridge School, Lanarkshire.

== Career ==
Fergusson enlisted with the Royal Engineers upon the outbreak of World War I, served from 1914 to 1920, and rose to the rank of captain. After demobilisation, he went to Singapore and joined the Straits Trading Company which was world’s largest tin smelting company providing more than half of the world's supply of tin. He worked in every area in which the company operated in Malaya, and also served with two of the company's subsidiaries in England. In 1946, he was appointed chairman and managing director of the company, succeeding Sir John Bagnall, his brother in law, positions which he held until his retirement in 1965.

Fergusson was a prominent member of the business community in Malaya. He served as a member of the Advisory Council, Singapore (1946–47); member of the Executive and Legislative Councils (1947–1954), and member of the Legislative Assembly, Singapore (1959–60). He was Chairman of the Singapore Chamber of Commerce (1946–1953).

== Personal life and death ==
Fergusson married Winifred Evelyn Bagnall in 1931, sister of Sir John Bagnall, and they had two sons and a daughter. He was a keen sportsman, an Inter-State rugby player, a golfer and tennis player.

Fergusson died on 24 October 1974, aged 77.

== Honours ==
Fergusson was created a Knight Bachelor in the 1953 Coronation Honours.
