= Tiong Bahru Constituency =

Constituency in Singapore (1955–1988)

Tiong Bahru Constituency was a constituency in Singapore. The constituency was formed in 1955 and was abolished in 1988.

== History ==
In 1955, the Tiong Bahru Constituency was formed.

In 1988, the constituency was abolished following the establishment of Group representation constituency (GRC) and Single Member Constituency (SMC).

== Members of Parliament ==
Year	Member of Parliament	Party
Formation (1955)
Legislative Assembly of Singapore
1955	William Tan	DP
1959	Lee Teck Him	PAP
1963	Lee Teck Him	PAP
Parliament of Singapore
1968	Ch'ng Jit Koon	PAP
1972	Ch'ng Jit Koon	PAP
1976	Ch'ng Jit Koon	PAP
1980	Ch'ng Jit Koon	PAP
1984	Ch'ng Jit Koon	PAP
Constituency abolished (1988)

== Electoral results ==
Note: The Elections Department does not include rejected votes when calculating the vote shares of candidates. Hence, all candidates' vote shares will total to 100% at any given election (may not appear so in multi-way contests due to rounding).

=== Elections in 1950s ===
General Election 1955
Party	Candidate	Votes	%
DP	William Tan	2,264	38.60
PP	Foo Few Ting	2,100	35.80
SA	Teo Seng Bee	1,502	25.60
Majority		164	2.80
Registered electors		12,664	
Turnout		10,577	46.32
DP win (new seat)			

General Election 1959
Party	Candidate	Votes	%	±%
PAP	Lee Teck Him	5,175	47.66	N/A
SPA	Lin Wo Ling	2,182	20.09	N/A
Independent	William Tan	1,730	15.93	N/A
LSP	Lee Bah Chee	996	9.17	N/A
Independent	Lim Huan Seng	494	4.55	N/A
Majority		2,993	24.77	N/A
Registered electors		12,151		▼4.05
Turnout		10,577	87.05	▲40.73
PAP gain from DP		Swing	▲47.66	

=== Elections in 1960s ===
General Election 1963
Party	Candidate	Votes	%	±%
PAP	Lee Teck Him	5,731	48.15	▲0.49
BS	Soon Dit Woo	3,798	31.91	N/A
UPP	Ng Teng Kian	1,088	9.14	N/A
Independent	William Tan	777	6.53	▼9.4
SA	Tan Kok Siong	508	4.27	N/A
Majority		1,933	16.24	▼11.33
Registered electors		12,534		▲3.15
Turnout		11,902	94.95	▲7.91
PAP hold		Swing	▲0.49	

General Election 1968
Party	Candidate	Votes	%	±%
PAP	Ch'ng Jit Koon	Unopposed		
Registered electors		16,532		▲31.90

=== Elections in 1970s ===
General Election 1972
Party	Candidate	Votes	%	±%
PAP	Ch'ng Jit Koon	11,991	75.62	N/A
UNF	Lee Kah Chit	894	5.64	N/A
WP	Seow Yong Chew	2,972	18.74	N/A
Majority		9,019	56.88	N/A
Registered electors		17,394		▲8.62
Turnout		15,857	91.16	N/A
PAP hold		Swing	N/A	

General Election 1976
Party	Candidate	Votes	%	±%
PAP	Ch'ng Jit Koon	15,248	83.10	▲7.48
UPF	Teo Kim Hoe	3,100	16.90	N/A
Majority		12,148	66.20	▲9.32
Registered electors		19,589		▲12.62
Turnout		18,348	93.66	▲2.50
PAP hold		Swing	▲7.48	

=== Elections in 1980s ===
General Election 1980
Party	Candidate	Votes	%	±%
PAP	Ch'ng Jit Koon	Unopposed		
Registered electors		18,077		▼1.48
PAP hold				

General Election 1984
Party	Candidate	Votes	%	±%
PAP	Ch'ng Jit Koon	Unopposed		
Registered electors		20,091		▲11.14
PAP hold				

== Historical maps ==
1955 General Election
