= Whampoa Single Member Constituency =

Former constituency in Singapore

Coordinates: 1.3248°N 103.8570°E

Whampoa
- Former single-member constituency for the Parliament of Singapore
- Region: Central Region, Singapore
- Electorate: 22,069

Former constituency
- Created: 1955
- Abolished: 2015
- Seats: 1
- Member: Constituency abolished
- Town Council: Moulmein–Kallang
- Merged: 1959, 1991, 2015
- Merged to: Kallang Constituency; Kampong Glam GRC; Jalan Besar GRC; Toa Payoh GRC
- Reformed: 1968, 2011
- Reformed from: Kallang Constituency; Jalan Besar GRC

Whampoa Single Member Constituency was a single-member constituency (SMC) in central Singapore. At abolition, it was managed by Moulmein–Kallang Town Council.

== History ==
In 1955, Whampoa Constituency was newly formed by carving out from the old Balestier Constituency. In 1959, the constituency was absorbed into Kallang Constituency.

In 1968, Whampoa Constituency was recreated as a standalone constituency by again carving out from Kallang Constituency. In 1988, it was renamed as Whampoa Single Member Constituency as part of Singapore's political reforms. It existed for another term until 1991 when it was abolished and divided into Kampong Glam, Jalan Besar and Toa Payoh Group Representation Constituencies.

In 2011, Whampoa Single Member Constituency was recreated by carving out from Jalan Besar Group Representation Constituency (GRC) as Jalan Besar GRC was dissolved and was replaced by Moulmein–Kallang and Tanjong Pagar GRCs respectively. Heng Chee How contested as a solo PAP candidate in the newly formed Whampoa SMC and won with 66.1% of the vote against the National Solidarity Party's Ken Sun. This was despite a national swing against the PAP. It was later merged back to the revived Jalan Besar GRC again in the 2015 Singaporean general election.

== Member of Parliament ==
Year	Member	Party
Formation
Legislative Assembly of Singapore
1955	Chew Swee Kee	LF
Constituency abolished (1959– 1968)
Parliament of Singapore
1968	Buang bin Omar Junid	PAP
1970	Augustine Tan Hui Heng	PAP
1972	Augustine Tan Hui Heng	PAP
1976	Augustine Tan Hui Heng	PAP
1980	Augustine Tan Hui Heng	PAP
1984	Augustine Tan Hui Heng	PAP
1988	Augustine Tan Hui Heng	PAP
Constituency abolished (1991– 2011)
2011	Heng Chee How	PAP
Constituency abolished (2015)

== Electoral results ==
Note: The Elections Department does not include rejected votes when calculating the vote shares of candidates. Hence, all candidates' vote shares will total to 100% at any given election (may not appear so in multi-way contests due to rounding).

=== Elections in 1950s ===
General Election 1955: Whampoa
Party	Candidate	Votes	%	±%
LF	Chew Swee Kee	2,961	45.88	N/A
PP	Thio Chan Bee	2,565	39.75	N/A
DP	Lee Kok Liang	927	14.37	N/A
Registered electors		12,345		
Turnout		6,453	52.27	
LF win (new seat)				

=== Elections in 1960s ===
General Election 1968: Whampoa
Party	Candidate	Votes	%
PAP	Buang bin Omar Junid	Unopposed	
Registered electors		12,854	
PAP win (new seat)			

=== Elections in 1970s ===
General Election 1972: Whampoa
Party	Candidate	Votes	%	±%
PAP	Augustine Tan Hui Heng	8,773	78.55	N/A
PF	Phang Juet Haw	2,395	21.45	N/A
Majority		6,378	57.1	N/A
Registered electors		12,044		▼0.06
Turnout		11,401	94.66	N/A
PAP hold		Swing	N/A	

General Election 1976: Whampoa
Party	Candidate	Votes	%	±%
PAP	Augustine Tan Hui Heng	14,636	80.98	▲2.43
WP	Mohamed Shariff bin Yahya	3,438	19.02	N/A
Majority		11,198	61.96	▲4.86
Registered electors		19,259		▲59.9
Turnout		18,468	95.89	▲1.2
PAP hold		Swing	▲2.43	

=== Elections in 1980s ===
General Election 1980: Whampoa
Party	Candidate	Votes	%	±%
PAP	Augustine Tan Hui Heng	Unopposed		
Registered electors		19,131		▼0.66
PAP hold				

General Election 1984: Whampoa
Party	Candidate	Votes	%	±%
PAP	Augustine Tan Hui Heng	Unopposed		
Registered electors		18,494		▼3.33
PAP hold				

General Election 1988: Whampoa
Party	Candidate	Votes	%	±%
PAP	Augustine Tan Hui Heng	7,522	59.47	N/A
NSP	Ken Sun	5,126	40.53	N/A
Majority		2,396	18.94	N/A
Registered electors		13,819		▼25.28
Turnout		12,841	92.92	N/A
PAP hold				

=== Elections in 2010s ===
General Election 2011: Whampoa
Party	Candidate	Votes	%
PAP	Heng Chee How	13,028	66.10
NSP	Ken Sun	6,683	33.90
Majority		6,345	32.2
Registered electors		21,631	
Turnout		20,199	93.4
PAP win (new seat)			

== Historical maps ==
1955 General Election
