= Farrer Park Constituency =

Former electoral division in Singapore

Farrer Park Constituency was a constituency in Singapore that existed from 1955 to 1980.

== Members of Parliament ==
Election	Member of Parliament	Party
Legislative Assembly of Singapore
1955	A. R. Lazarous	LF
1959	A. P. Rajah	Independent
1963	S. R. Dharmarajoo	PAP
Parliament of Singapore
1968	Lee Chiaw Meng	PAP
1972	Lee Chiaw Meng	PAP
1976	Lee Chiaw Meng	PAP
1980	Lee Chiaw Meng	PAP

== Electoral results ==
Note: The Elections Department does not include rejected votes when calculating the vote shares of candidates. Hence, all candidates' vote shares will total to 100% at any given election (may not appear so in multi-way contests due to rounding).

=== Elections in 1950s ===
General Election 1955: Farrer Park
Party	Candidate	Votes	%	±%
LF	A. R. Lazarous	2,585	38.5	
PAP	Devan Nair	2,219	33.1	
PP	Eric Wee	1,784	26.6	
Independent	C. T. B. Unnithan	85	1.3	
Independent	Chua Kim Watt	37	0.6	
Majority		366	5.4	N/A
Turnout		6,803	55.6	
Registered electors		12,242		
LF win (new seat)				

General Election 1959: Farrer Park
Party	Candidate	Votes	%	±%
Independent	A. P. Rajah	4,077	44.5	
PAP	Tan Teck Ngiap	3,832	41.9	+8.8
Independent	Soo-Tho Siu Hee	789	8.6	
Independent	Chan Kooi Chew	311	3.4	
Independent	Arthur Joseph	147	1.6	
Majority		245	2.6	
Turnout		9,291	90.3	
Registered electors		10,293		
Independent gain from LF		Swing		

=== Elections in 1960s ===
General Election 1963: Farrer Park
Party	Candidate	Votes	%	±%
PAP	S. R. Dharmarajoo	5,365	55.7	+13.8
BS	Lee Chin Siang	2,619	27.2	
SA	A. P. Rajah	1,232	12.8	−31.7
UPP	Wee Kia Eng	414	4.3	
Majority		2,746	28.5	
Turnout		9,704	95.2	
Registered electors		10,189		
PAP gain from SA		Swing		

General Election 1968: Farrer Park
Party	Candidate	Votes	%	±%
PAP	Lee Chiaw Meng	7,826	84.91	+29.21
Independent	M. P. D. Nair	1,391	15.09	
Majority		6,435	69.82	
Turnout		9,217	89.57	
Registered electors		10,290		
PAP hold		Swing		

=== Elections in 1970s ===
General Election 1972: Farrer Park
Party	Candidate	Votes	%	±%
PAP	Lee Chiaw Meng	8,521	73.82	−11.09
WP	J. B. Jeyaretnam	2,668	23.11	
UNF	S. A. Latiff	354	3.07	
Majority		5,853	50.71	
Turnout		11,189	88.05	
Registered electors		12,707		
PAP hold		Swing		

General Election 1976: Farrer Park
Party	Candidate	Votes	%	±%
PAP	Lee Chiaw Meng	Uncontested	—	
Registered electors		11,949		

== Historical maps ==
1955 General Election
