= Tanjong Pagar Single Member Constituency =

Singaporean electoral district (1955–1991)

Tanjong Pagar
- Former Single Member constituency for the Parliament of Singapore
- Region: Singapore

Former constituency
- Created: 1955
- Abolished: 1991
- Seats: 1
- Member: Constituency Abolished
- Town Council: Tanjong Pagar
- Replaced by: Tanjong Pagar GRC

Tanjong Pagar Single Member Constituency was a single member constituency (SMC) in Tanjong Pagar, Singapore. The constituency was formed in 1955 and was abolished in 1991. It was one of the longest-surviving constituencies since the pre-independence era, and also one of the traditional safe seat for the incumbent governing People's Action Party. Tanjong Pagar was held by Lee Kuan Yew, the first throughout its constituency's presence until its abolishment, and Tanjong Pagar has since become a group representation constituency afterwards.

== History ==
In 1955, the Tanjong Pagar constituency was formed from the City and Keppel constituencies, and has took in the former constituencies of Sepoy Lines in 1976 and Anson in 1988 over time. In 1991, after Lee become Senior minister, his ward was upgraded into a GRC of the same name by incorporating the neighbouring Tiong Bahru GRC, which also carries the namesake division until the 2011 election, in which it was now called Tanjong Pagar-Tiong Bahru.

The incumbent Lee had originally considered for Tanglin, but he settled for Tanjong Pagar due to its strong dockworker base and welfare networks. Throughout its lifetime, Lee had overwhelmingly re-elected in very strong margins and polled among the top-performing constituency in five out of six elections (1984 was the only exception due to a walkover), including a record-breaking score of 94.34% in 1968. After Tanjong Pagar becomes a GRC in 1991, Tanjong Pagar enjoyed walkovers in subsequent elections until its first contest in 24 years in 2015, six months after the death of its original MP Lee, after serving Tanjong Pagar for a record six decades in service, hence 1988 was the last election where Lee had a contest.

== Member of Parliament ==
Year	Member of Parliament	Party
Legislative Assembly of Singapore
1955	Lee Kuan Yew	PAP
1959	Lee Kuan Yew	PAP
1963	Lee Kuan Yew	PAP
Parliament of Singapore
1968	Lee Kuan Yew	PAP
1972	Lee Kuan Yew	PAP
1976	Lee Kuan Yew	PAP
1980	Lee Kuan Yew	PAP
1984	Lee Kuan Yew	PAP
1988	Lee Kuan Yew	PAP

== Electoral results ==
Note: The Elections Department does not include rejected votes when calculating the vote shares of candidates. Hence, all candidates' vote shares will total to 100% at any given election (may not appear so in multi-way contests due to rounding).

=== Elections in 1950s ===
General Election 1955: Tanjong Pagar
Party	Candidate	Votes	%	±%
PAP	Lee Kuan Yew	6,029	78.33	
PP	Lim Seck Tiong	908	11.80	
DP	Lam Thian	760	9.87	
Majority		5,121	66.53	
Turnout		7,737	57.6	
PAP win (new seat)				

By-election 1957: Tanjong Pagar
Party	Candidate	Votes	%	±%
PAP	Lee Kuan Yew	4,707	68.1	−10.2
LSP	Chong Wei Ling	1,315	19.0	N/A
Independent	Koh Choon Hong	887	12.8	N/A
Majority		3,392	49.1	−17.4
Turnout		6,985	47.3	−10.3
PAP hold		Swing	N/A	

General Election 1959: Tanjong Pagar
Party	Candidate	Votes	%	±%
PAP	Lee Kuan Yew	7,617	71.04	−7.29
LSP	Subrahmanyam Chinniah	3,105	28.96	+28.96
Majority		4,512	42.08	−24.45
Turnout		10,870	91.0	+33.4
PAP hold		Swing	-7.29	

=== Elections in 1960s ===
General Election 1963: Tanjong Pagar
Party	Candidate	Votes	%	±%
PAP	Lee Kuan Yew	6,317	58.93	−12.11
BS	Ong Hock Siang	3,537	32.99	+32.99
UPP	Lim Peng Kang	473	4.41	+4.41
SA	Chng Boon Eng	393	3.67	+3.67
Majority		2,780	25.94	−16.14
Turnout		10,841	95.1	
PAP hold		Swing	-12.11	

General Election 1968: Tanjong Pagar
Party	Candidate	Votes	%	±%
PAP	Lee Kuan Yew	9,128	94.34	+35.41
Independent	Vetrivelu Rengaswamy	548	5.66	+5.66
Majority		8,580	88.68	+62.74
Turnout		9,902	91.6	−3.5
PAP hold		Swing	+35.41	

=== Elections in 1970s ===
General Election 1972: Tanjong Pagar
Party	Candidate	Votes	%	±%
PAP	Lee Kuan Yew	7,542	84.08	−10.26
PF	Leong Mun Kwai	1,428	15.92	+15.92
Majority		6,114	68.16	−20.52
Turnout		9,142	91.9	+0.3
PAP hold		Swing	-10.26	

General Election 1976: Tanjong Pagar
Party	Candidate	Votes	%	±%
PAP	Lee Kuan Yew	9,996	89.03	+4.95
United People's Front	Harbans Singh	1,232	10.97	+10.97
Majority		8,764	78.06	+9.9
Turnout		11,479	94.5	+2.6
PAP hold		Swing	+4.95	

=== Elections in 1980s ===
General Election 1980: Tanjong Pagar
Party	Candidate	Votes	%	±%
PAP	Lee Kuan Yew	11,730	92.74	+3.71
UF	Johnny Wee Lai Seng	555	4.39	+4.39
United People's Front	Lee Mun Hung	363	2.87	−8.1
Majority		11,175	88.35	+10.29
Turnout		12,941	94.0	−0.5
PAP hold		Swing	+3.71	

General Election 1984: Tanjong Pagar
Party	Candidate	Votes	%	±%
PAP	Lee Kuan Yew	Walkover		
Majority				
Turnout		15,812		
PAP hold		Swing		

General Election 1988: Tanjong Pagar
Party	Candidate	Votes	%	±%
PAP	Lee Kuan Yew	14,043	81.60	
Independent	Gnaguru Thamboo Mylvaganam	3,167	18.40	
Majority		10,876	63.20	
Turnout		17,685	92.9	
PAP hold		Swing		

== Historical maps ==
1955 General Election
