= Paya Lebar Single Member Constituency =

Former Singaporean constituency

Coordinates: 1.356°N 103.91°E

Paya Lebar
- Single Member constituency for the Parliament of Singapore
- Region: Singapore

Current constituency
- Created: 1955
- Seats: 1
- Member: Constituency Abolished
- Replaced by: Aljunied GRC

Paya Lebar Single Member Constituency was a constituency in Singapore.

It used to exist from 1955 to 1988 as Paya Lebar Constituency and was renamed as Paya Lebar Single Member Constituency (SMC) as part of Singapore's political reforms. The SMC was merged into Aljunied Group Representation Constituency in 1991.

== Member of Parliament ==
Year	Member of Parliament	Party
Legislative Assembly of Singapore
1955	Lim Koon Teck	PP
1959	Tan Kia Gan	PAP
1963	Kow Kee Seng	BS
Parliament of Singapore
1968	Tay Boon Too	PAP
1972	Tay Boon Too	PAP
1976	Tan Cheng San	PAP
1980	Sia Kah Hui	PAP
1984	Philip Tan Tee Yong	PAP
1988	Philip Tan Tee Yong	PAP

== Electoral results ==
Note: The Elections Department does not include rejected votes when calculating the vote shares of candidates. Hence, all candidates' vote shares will total to 100% at any given election (may not appear so in multi-way contests due to rounding).

=== Elections in 1950s ===
General Election 1955: Paya Lebar
Party	Candidate	Votes	%	±%
PP	Lim Koon Teck	3,330	52.1	
DP	Tan Eng Joo	3,065	47.9	
Majority		265	4.2	N/A
Turnout		6,494	50.6	
PP win (new seat)				

General Election 1959: Paya Lebar
Party	Candidate	Votes	%	±%
PAP	Tan Kia Gan	6,531	60.8	
Independent	Ong Chye Hock	4,209	39.2	
Majority		2,322	21.6	N/A
Turnout		10,842	89.7	
PAP gain from SPA		Swing		

=== Elections in 1960s ===
General Election 1963: Paya Lebar
Party	Candidate	Votes	%	±%
BS	Kow Kee Seng	6,152	48.0	
PAP	Tan Kia Gan	5,402	42.1	−18.7
UPP	Lau Tok Keong	858	6.7	
SA	Goh Yeow Dek	415	3.2	
Majority		750	5.9	
Turnout		12,946	95.6	
BS gain from PAP		Swing		

== Historical maps ==
1955 General Election
