= Ulu Bedok Constituency =

Former Singaporean constituency

Location of Ulu Bedok in Singapore

Ulu Bedok Constituency was a constituency in Singapore that existed from 1955 to 1959.

The constituency was formed in 1955, covering the areas of Bedok, Kembangan and Geylang Serai. The word ulu in Malay means remote as the eastern region of Singapore was undeveloped at that time. In 1959, the constituency was abolished.

== Member of Parliament ==
Year	Member of Parliament	Party
Legislative Assembly of Singapore
1955	Abdul Hamid bin Haji Juma	UMNO

== Electoral results ==
Note: The Elections Department (ELD) does not include rejected votes when calculating the vote shares of candidates. Hence, all candidates' vote shares will total to 100% at any given election (may not appear so in multi-way contests due to rounding).

=== Elections in 1950s ===
General Election 1955: Ulu Bedok
Party	Candidate	Votes	%	±%
UMNO	Abdul Hamid bin Haji Jumat	5,721	61.04	
DP	Toh Seng Sit	2,999	32.00	
PP	A. Hamid Rahmat	652	6.96	
Majority		2,722	29.04	
Turnout		9,464	56.0	
UMNO win (new seat)				

Note: UMNO, the Malayan Chinese Association (MCA), the Malayan Indian Congress (MIC) and the Singapore People's Alliance (SPA) formed the informal Singapore Alliance (SA), which contested the 1955 general election. Abdul Hamid, an UMNO candidate, is viewed by the ELD as a candidate for SA.

== See also ==
- Bedok SMC
- Bedok GRC
