= Pasir Panjang Constituency =

Singaporean parliamentary constituency from 1955 to 1988

Coordinates: 1.23°N 103.78°E

Pasir Panjang
- Former Single member constituency
- Region: Central Region, Singapore
- Electorate: 17,149

Former constituency
- Created: 1955
- Abolished: 1984
- Seats: 1
- Party: Barisan Sosialis (1961–1963); Malaysian Chinese Association (1955); People's Action Party (1959–1961, 1963–1984)
- Member: 1
- Created from: Bukit Timah Constituency, Keppel Constituency
- Replaced by: Pasir Panjang Group Representation Constituency

Pasir Panjang Single Member Constituency was a constituency in Singapore. It used to exist from 1955 to 1988.

== Electoral history ==
In 1961, after being expelled from PAP, Tee Kim Leng crossed the floor and joined Barisan Sosialis.

== Member of Parliament ==
Year	Member	Party
Formation
Legislative Assembly of Singapore
1955	Wong Foo Nam	MCA
1959	Tee Kim Leng	PAP
1961	Tee Kim Leng	BS (Note: Tee was expelled from PAP and joined BS.)
1963	Othman Wok	PAP
Parliament of Singapore
1968	Othman Wok	PAP
1972	Othman Wok	PAP
1976	Othman Wok	PAP
1980	Abbas Abu Amin	PAP
1984	Abbas Abu Amin	PAP
Constituency abolished (1988)

== Electoral results ==
Note: The Elections Department does not include rejected votes when calculating the vote shares of candidates. Hence, all candidates' vote shares will total to 100% at any given election (may not appear so in multi-way contests due to rounding).

=== Elections in 1960s ===
General Election 1963
Party	Candidate	Votes	%
PAP	Othman Wok	2,879	45.3
BS	Tay Cheng Kang	1,887	29.7
SA	Ahmad b. Rahmat	1,351	21.3
UPP	Yong Ah Kau	238	3.7
Majority		992	
Total valid votes		6,355	
Rejected ballots			
Turnout			
Registered electors		6,721	
PAP win (new seat)			

General Election 1968
Party	Candidate	Votes	%
PAP	Othman Wok	Unopposed	
Registered electors		12,394	
PAP hold			

=== Elections in 1970s ===
General Election 1972
Party	Candidate	Votes	%	±%
PAP	Othman Wok	9,209	71.8	
United National Front	Syed Ahmad Bin Syed Husain	3,623	28.2	N/A
Majority		5,586		N/A
Total valid votes		12,832		N/A
Rejected ballots				N/A
Turnout				N/A
Registered electors		13,964		
PAP hold				

General Election 1976
Party	Candidate	Votes	%	±%
PAP	Othman Wok	8,138	71.9	
WP	Zainal Abiddin bin Mohd Shah	3,176	28.1	
Majority		4,962		N/A
Total valid votes		11,314		N/A
Rejected ballots				N/A
Turnout				N/A
Registered electors		12,142		
PAP hold		Swing	▲	

=== Elections in 1980s ===
General Election 1980: Pasir Panjang
Party	Candidate	Votes	%	±%
PAP	Abbas Abu Amin	11,824	72.6	▲0.7
WP	Zainal Abiddin bin Mohd Shah	4,470	27.4	▼0.7
Majority		7,354	45.2	▲1.4
Registered electors		17,743		▲46.1
Turnout		16,294	91.8	▼1.4
PAP hold		Swing	▲1.4	

General Election 1984: Pasir Panjang
Party	Candidate	Votes	%	±%
PAP	Abbas Abu Amin	9,316	59.3	▼13.3
WP	John Gan Eng Guan	6,022	38.4	▲11
Angkatan Islam Singapura	M Sani Jan	359	2.3	N/A
Majority		3,294	20.9	▼24.3
Registered electors		17,149		▼3.3
Turnout		15,697	91.5	▼0.3
PAP hold		Swing	▼26.6	

== Historical maps ==
1955 General Election
