= Democratic Party (Singapore) =

- Chinese name: 民主党
- Malay name: Parti Demokratik
- Founder: Tan Eng Joo
- Founded: 11 February 1955; 71 years ago
- Dissolved: 5 February 1956; 70 years ago
- Merged into: Liberal Socialist Party
- Succeeded by: Liberal Socialist Party
- Colours: Brown

The Democratic Party (abbreviation: DP; Chinese: 民主党) was a short-lived political party in Singapore that operated from 1955 to 1956, it was started by various wealthy businessmen, many of whom were leaders of the Chinese Chamber of Commerce and Industry.

== History ==
DP was led by Tan Eng Joo, the nephew of tycoon Tan Lark Sye. Tan was recognised for driving the rubber trade, and was the founder of the International Rubber Association. Due to its financial backing, DP was often labelled as the "party of millionaires" and the "Chamber Party". In its manifesto, DP had called for the enactment of a multilingual legislature, promotion of free trade and investment, provision of equal grants for schools of all races, and setting up of low cost housing schemes.

DP was one of the largest political parties in Singapore, and had sent 20 candidates to contest the 25 seats in the 1955 general election, versus 22 candidates by the Progressive Party (PP) and 17 candidates by the Labour Front (LF). However, it wasn't successful to form the government, the LF became the ruling party following the general election.

On 5 February 1956, DP and PP merged to form the Liberal Socialist Party (LSP), to contest the 1959 general election. However, it also wasn't successful to form the government, the People's Action Party (PAP) became the ruling party following the general election. The LSP was wound up a few years later.

== Election results ==
=== Legislative Assembly ===
Election	Leader	Votes	%	Seats^{1}						Position	Result
Election	Leader	Votes	%	Up for Contest	Contested			Total	+/–	Position	Result
Election	Leader	Votes	%	Up for Contest	Seats	Won	Lost	Total	+/–	Position	Result
1955	Tan Eng Joo	32,115	20.54%	25	20	2	18	2 / 25	▲2	▲3rd	Opposition

1. 25 of the 32 seats are directly elected.

==== Seats contested ====
Election	Constituencies contested	Contested vote %
1955	Bukit Timah, Cairnhill, Changi, Geylang, Kampong Kapor, Katong, Pasir Panjang, Paya Lebar, Punggol-Tampines, Queenstown, Rochore, Seletar, Serangoon, Stamford, Tanglin, Tanjong Pagar, Telok Ayer, Tiong Bahru, Ulu Bedok, Whampoa	24.8%

== See also ==
- Progressive Party
- Liberal Socialist Party
- Singapore Democratic Party
- Workers' Party
