= E. S. Moorthy =

Singaporean politician

Moorthy in 1954.

E. Sundra Moorthy was a Singaporean schoolteacher, politician and union leader. He served as the general secretary of the Labour Party and the Singapore Continuation School Teachers' Union, and as the honorary secretary to the Singapore Workers' Education Association.

A schoolteacher, Moorthy came to be an advocate of adult education and literacy. In 1948, he was elected the general secretary to the Singapore Workers' Education Association, which organised classes to tackle these and often struggled to meet the demand. He was elected to the committee of the Singapore Council for Adult Education in 1952 and its general secretary the year after.

Moorthy joined the Labour Party on or after its formation in late 1948 and became an assistant secretary before resigning in 1950. He returned by late 1951 and became a member of its General Council before he was elected the general secretary in 1953, by which point the party had suffered from infighting. He was recognised as being aligned with the faction of the party led by P. M. Williams, which grew to dominate party affairs, though he was also associated with C. R. Dasaratha Raj.

== Teaching and unions ==
Moorthy was of Ceylonese origin, and he became a schoolteacher in Singapore, passing the local Education Department's Oral English test by January 1950. He "made a study of tiffin-money" and observed that some of his students came to school to eat as there was no food at home, the parents having left for work before they could prepare breakfast. He found that this meant that less fortunate parents often had to give more pocket money to their children. In response to comments by the headmaster of the Bedok Boys' School, who believed that students needed no more than 10 cents a day, Moorthy argued that the students were "in general not getting enough" pocket money, though he "[didn't] blame parents", particularly those who were worse off. By April 1949, he was a member of the East-West Society. He retired from teaching by 1954.

=== Adult education ===
In August 1950, Moorthy was elected the general secretary of the newly founded Singapore Workers' Education Association (SWEA), under V. Rajaratnam as president and Mansoor Adabi and Lee Yong Min as vice-presidents. The primary aim of the association was to improve adult literacy in Singapore, and to develop the general knowledge and "cultural potentialities" of local workers. Though it was not the first organisation established on the island to promote adult education, the acting Director of Education stated that there was "so much adult education work to be done" that he supported the establishment of more organisations tackling this.

The SWEA organised various classes in adult education for both men and women, as well as classes for children, in classrooms lent to them by schools. By September 1951, it had seven classes held at the Rangoon Road English School and the St. George's Road Tamil School. Moorthy claimed that the demand for classes was then high enough that the association, which then had 810 students, were struggling to find enough space to meet it. They were then working with several trade unions. The following month, he wrote to Harry Nutt, the general secretary of the International Federation of Workers' Education Associations in London, to suggest that an Asian Regional Conference on adult education be organised to help tackle illiteracy in Asia. The SWEA was then awaiting a response to their application to affiliate with the Federation.

On speaking of the SWEA's challenges, Moorthy noted that most of their classes were held in the evenings, which meant that they were often disrupted by blackouts. They did not have textbooks suited for adult education and were having trouble finding enough full-time teachers, though he felt that the latter could be remedied by paying their teachers a monthly salary as opposed to per lesson. Moorthy was elected to the committee of the Singapore Council for Adult Education (SCAE) in March 1952, serving under Frederic Mason and Lee Kong Chian as president and vice-president, respectively. In May, he was re-elected the secretary of the SWEA under A. R. Lazarous as president and Lee Yong Min and S. S. Manyam as vice-presidents. Moorthy was also elected to the literary sub-committee of the SCAE by January 1953. He then argued that the government grants for the SWEA's English classes for adults should be increased such that they could double the number of classes, stating that they could not cope with the demand. There were then reportedly over 1,000 seeking to be admitted to their classes. In February, Moorthy was elected the honorary secretary of the SCAE, again under Mason and Lee Kong Chian.

The SCAE's operations were funded by a quarterly $100,000 grant from the Education Department. In January 1955, the department introduced additional conditions to the grant, which among other terms stipulated that the grant should go entirely to funding classes as opposed to organisational costs. The members of the SCAE could not agree on the new conditions, finding that they would "interfere with the internal affairs of member units." The council's executive committee initially agreed to the terms, though Moorthy claimed that this had been done against the will of the member units, who felt that the "undue pressure" would make it nearly "impossible to continue their work." The committee then asked the department to delay the grant to the second quarter, and several classes funded by these grants were postponed. With this, the council was left with enough to fund just one more week of classes. To deal with this, a delegation, comprising Mason, Moorthy, T. H. Silcock, D. D. Chelliah, B. G. Sahai and Keith Payne, was to negotiate with the Director of Education, R. M. Young, to ask for an emergency interim grant.

At a meeting of the SCAE the month after, Silcock moved a resolution seeking to censure Mason for treating the council's member associations' classes as though they were the council's own, thus "negotiating in a manner prejudicial to the autonomy of the associations." Moorthy then sought to move a resolution urging the Education Finance Board to do away with the new conditions, arguing that the department was working to make the SCAE and its member associations mere "extensions of the department." The East-West Society withdrew from the SCAE as a result. Moorthy then penned a "attack" on Mason in the SWEA's newsletter, alleging that the government had been "convinced" that the SCAE's grant should not have been increased as they had run a surplus the year before, and that this surplus should have gone to fund "badly needed extra classes", which the council was now unable to set up. He was then re-elected the SWEA's secretary under Lazarous as president and Lee and M. Siraj as vice-presidents.

By April 1957, Moorthy claimed that the SWEA had 3,000 students across night classes held in nine government schools. In January 1958, the SCAE announced that it would be organising adult education classes in more subjects, though Moorthy then noted that a lack of space to keep up with the growth in their student count had increasingly become one of the council's greatest concerns. By December, he was the SCAE's assistant secretary for further education. He remained in this post until his resignation at the start of April 1960.

=== Union work ===
Moorthy was a member of the Singapore Afternoon Schools Association, formed in 1951 as the Government Afternoon Schools Association. At a general meeting in June 1952, he initiated a resolution for the association to call on the government to remove afternoon classes on Saturdays such that afternoon school teachers could have the day off as morning school teachers did, noting that afternoon school teachers would rather work longer on weekdays and have the day off.

At an extraordinary general meeting of the association on 9 August, Moorthy introduced a motion to deliberate converting the association into a trade union, believing that it would be much "stronger" that way. He noted that "nearly all classes" of teachers in Singapore were already represented by their own unions, and he believed that they could count on those unions for support. The motion was unanimously passed, and the work of overseeing this was put in the hands of the newly elected officeholders. Moorthy was elected the secretary under H. C. Chan as president and M. Gunaratnam as vice-president. Additionally, it was decided at the meeting that the group would also represent teachers at aided afternoon schools, as opposed to just teachers at government-managed afternoon schools.

The association was then organised as the Singapore Continuation School Teachers' Union (SCSTU), with Moorthy continuing as the general secretary. In October 1953, he sent a letter to the Legislative Council accusing the Education Department of "exploiting the afternoon teachers", noting that these teachers, numbering over 300, received a lower salary than "regular" teachers, and of seeking to "[replace] them with student teachers." A four-member delegation, headed by Chan and also comprising Moorthy, Gunaratnam and Daniel Sundram, was formed the month after to meet with the Director of Education to discuss the issues faced by these teachers. The Department then proposed that the teachers be allowed a chance to be promoted to permanent positions through an examination. The SCSTU was generally satisfied with this, though Moorthy argued that elder teachers who were experienced and qualified should be exempted from this. By late December 1956, he was the general secretary of the Singapore Alliance of Teachers.

== Politics ==
Moorthy joined the Labour Party (SLP), formed in 1948 to advocate for workers' rights by unionists, in particular M. A. Majid, P. M. Williams and M. P. D. Nair. It was the second political party active in Singapore at the time, after the Progressive Party (PP). At the SLP's annual conference in early 1950, Williams and fellow unionist Lim Yew Hock came together and gathered their supporters to have themselves elected the party's general secretary and president, respectively. Moorthy was elected an assistant secretary to the SLP. However, he resigned from the party as a whole on 28 October 1950.

P. M. Williams, founder and general secretary of the SLP.

He rejoined the SLP by late 1951 and was elected a member of its General Council. He became a leader of the council's more "left-wing", alongside members such as Williams, who served as the SLP's general-secretary, and V. P. Abdullah. This faction of the party, considered more radical and comprising "white-collar office workers", was spearheaded in particular by Williams. They stood in opposition to the more moderate "right-wing" of the SLP, comprising mostly Chinese "professionals and businessmen", with factions led by Lim and Francis Thomas, a founding member and former president.

Moorthy introduced a resolution at a meeting of the General Council in October calling for the SLP to oppose the proposed Ministerial system as nominated members on the legislatures and the chambers of commerce had yet to be abolished, and so it thus "[would] not consider" the system a step towards increased self-governance in Singapore. The resolution called for the reunification of Singapore with the Federation of Malaya, with a "single, fully-elected and sovereign legislature on the basis of universal adult franchise." This was supported by Williams and Abdullah and "strongly and successfully opposed" by members of the "right-wing" such as Thomas and M. P. D. Nair. Instead, the council approved Thomas's resolution, which stated that the SLP "[doubted] the value" of the system and would further scrutinise and deliberate the proposal before finally coming to a decision on it.

At the annual conference in March 1952, Moorthy was nominated for election as general secretary of the SLP, alongside Williams factioners D. Stevens and Lee Yong Min, as well as Williams himself, though they all declined except for Stevens, who was elected to succeed Williams unanimously. Lim was re-elected president and Williams factioner A. R. Lazarous was elected the treasurer. Moorthy, Williams and Williams's brother P. R. Williams, also Ceylonese, spoke against the National Service Bill, alongside six of the seven Chinese-speaking members who spoke at the conference, the exception being Lee Choon Eng. Moorthy and the Williams brothers were described by an attendee of the conference against their faction as having "long been known for their extremist tendencies".

By 1953, the SLP had suffered severely from in-fighting between the factions, which came to a head with the candidate nominations for the 1952 City Council election. The list was disputed for the inclusion of many in Williams's faction, such as Lazarous, Stevens, Lee and Williams himself, culminating in Lim's expulsion and S. K. Reddi's appointment as his successor. In 1952, the party fielded four candidates and only won one, losing one seat. A 'rebel' group of the party refused to accept Lim's expulsion, viewing the General Council as being increasingly dominated by Williams and his group and continuing to recognise Lim as president. All the party's City Councillors, save for Lazarous, Manyam and P. R. Williams, were aligned with the 'rebel' group. This faction eventually split from the SLP entirely. Moorthy, as a leader of the Williams faction, authored a memorandum accusing Lim of having "packed" the conference at which he was elected president with "non-citizen workers" he brought into the SLP to vote for him, which Lim never disputed. He also claimed that it was Lim who had pushed for his favoured candidates in 1952 and that the candidates selected by the General Council were the "popular ones."

In July 1953, Reddi claimed that party membership had fallen to just around 300, down from the thousands which it had previously claimed, which the Indian Daily Mail still considered doubtful. Several former leaders of the party had opined that the SLP was "long since dead or on the point of dying." The Daily Mail itself declared the party to be "of no use to the Colony." Reddi officially resigned on 21 July, opining that the party's situation was now "hopeless and intolerable" and that it had "ceased to exist as a coherent body in anything but name." He accused P. M. Williams of dominating party affairs behind-the-scenes through members of his faction on the General Council, outvoting Reddi on "every worthwhile issue" and preventing the party from achieving any meaningful progress. On 25 July, the General Council elected T. D. Richards to succeed Reddi as the party chair.

C. R. Dasaratha Raj, who was the SLP's sole remaining Legislative Councillor and in a faction of his own, announced that he would form a new Socialist Party along the lines of the Fabian Society which would not contest elections and was to serve as a "vacuum" in the SLP by "[seeking] solutions to political problems unfettered by tactical politics." It was to be governed by a committee of seven with Raj as president and Moorthy as the secretary, and they had already applied to the Registrar of Societies. Raj claimed that he had been planning for the formation of such a party for the past two years. However, this was described by S. Rajaratnam of The Singapore Standard as a "nebulous affair" and noted that the public was "in the dark" as to who the other officeholders were or "who elected them."

=== General secretary ===
At the annual conference in September, Moorthy was elected the general secretary of the SLP, succeeding Stevens, and Richards was re-elected the chair. Reportedly for the first time in its history, over half of the members elected to the General Council were union leaders. In response to calls for Raj to resign his seat on the Legislative Council in protest of his non-inclusion on the Rendel Commission, Moorthy claimed that he had received several letters asking that Raj not step down and for the matter to be put in the hands of the General Council. Moorthy was then appointed to a sub-committee that was to plan the campaign for the by-election that would be called if Raj were to resign.

Moorthy revealed at the end of September that, for the upcoming City Council election, to be held on 5 December, the SLP had thus far only decided on fielding Manyam, previously an independent whose term was to end with that election, as the party's candidate for the North Ward. Mak Pak Shee, who had recently rejoined the SLP after leaving in 1951, was to run in the East Ward as an independent. He had not been permitted to run on the party ticket as he did not meet the requirements, though he was to receive the party's support and the SLP would not field a candidate there. The Singapore Standard then reported that it was expected that the SLP would contest in the South and Rochore Wards in addition to the North Ward. The SLP was to announce the rest of the candidates following the 14 October meeting of its General Council, though Moorthy noted that they had yet to decide if they would contest the City Ward. However, Moorthy announced after that that the party had "deferred [their] decisions" on rest of the candidates, and The Straits Times believed that the SLP would not name any more.

==== Raj's expulsion ====
C. R. Dasaratha Raj, the only member of the SLP on the Legislative Council by 1953.

The local press reported on a petition calling for a special conference of the SLP. This included signatories such as "Joseph Stalin", "Kublai Khan" and "Von Papen Pus", alongside Williams himself. Raj asked Moorthy to convene a meeting to discuss the matter, which he felt "hurt the prestige of the party", though Moorthy declined. On 18 October, members who were against Williams and his faction delivered a letter to Moorthy, demanding that an emergency meeting be convened, for Williams and his "close relatives" to be expelled from the SLP and for action to be taken against all of his "stooges", noting that Moorthy himself was a "close associate" of Williams. The members threatened to bring the matter up at the upcoming special conference on 1 November. The letter opined that Williams's expulsion was necessary for the SLP's revival and for ending the party's "continued estrangement" from the local labour movement. The letter accused Williams of quietly shifting the SLP office from Kerbau Road to Middle Road, where Williams had his union's office.

Williams denied the allegations and called this a "side-track" on the issue of Raj's proposed resignation, while Moorthy sent out notices for a meeting of the General Council to be held on Middle Road. A resolution calling on Raj to resign was to be tabled at this meeting. Moorthy denied that the offices had been moved to Middle Road and claimed that he had not received a petition calling for Williams's expulsion, as he was told he would. Additionally, he claimed that he was as much aligned with Raj as he was Williams, and as such was "not allied to any particular faction in the party." He and other members of the council denied being a "stooge" of William. It was then announced that the special conference had been cancelled as the council felt that there was "no change of mind" among the SLP members who had previously deliberated the matter at the annual conference.

Disapproving of the meeting, Richards attempted to call it off to no avail, stating that he "[knew] it would do nobody any good." After this, he resigned from the SLP in protest just three months after he had become its chair. He was followed by three other members of the General Council: Karim Dzafir, Mohamed Said Alias and George Joshua. An official of the SLP claimed to believe that the resignations "[would] not affect the party." The meeting was attended by just six members of the Council, Lee, Abdullah, Moorthy, Chew Seng, Ong Eng Kheng and Stella Manyam, Manyam's wife and Williams's sister, as well as two ex-officio members, Lazarous and Manyam. Raj had shown up at first, though he left early. This was just enough to form a quorum, and the council voted to call on Raj to resign. Moorthy then claimed that he had only received the resignations of Richards and Dzafir. Raj then opined that the Labour Party should be wound up as he felt that it was "non-existent."

At the end of the month, Raj claimed that the special conference petition, the letter to Moorthy and the convening of the General Council meeting were all part of a "plot" to oust him from the SLP, and that he had identified the "source" of this. Moorthy then claimed that the originator of the "plot" to oust Raj from the SLP was Raj himself, who had mooted the idea of resigning in protest. He then alleged that Raj complained to the local press instead of discussing the matter with the General Council. Moorthy then urged Raj to "wind up" his political activities, arguing that he had "committed a series of political blunders" and that his "suggestions [were] not worth considering seriously", and accusing him of stating that the SLP should be shuttered to "save his seat on the Legislative Council." A resolution was then to be moved at the next meeting of the council to discuss suspending Raj for three months if he did not cease his political activity. Raj chose to quit the SLP at the start of November, with Moorthy arguing that he had done so entirely because he did not wish to give up his seat on the Legislative Council.

The Singapore Standard then argued that the SLP, which it described as "buffoons", could "relieve the drab monotony of local politics by providing comic relief." Moorthy opined that this was a "continuation of [the Standard's] policy of mud-slinging and vituperation in which [they had] indulged for the past two years." He alleged that the Standard's "interest in the labour movement is only to the extent of reporting and commenting upon splits, resignations, expulsions and threats — or fabricating them in their absence." The editor of the Standard then wrote that Moorthy and "his unhappy band of 5-carat proletariats must indeed be living in cuckooland" if he believed that the rifts in the movement were mere "fabrications" of the local press.

Manyam was ultimately left the sole candidate running on the SLP ticket in the election, though Mak, as well as S. M. Hussain and V. Mariappan, ran as independent Labour candidates. In the election, Mak was the only one of the four to win his seat. The PP won three of the six seats, which Moorthy took as a sign that the local electorate was "not adequately conscious to reject a party which [was] anti-Malayan and anti-Labour in outlook." He further argued that the failure of the MCA-UMNO Alliance demonstrated that Singapore "[had] no time for communal politics."

=== Abdullah's chairmanship ===
V. P. Abdullah, elected the SLP's chair in December 1953.

A conference was held on 26 December to elect a new chair for the party; the position had been vacant since Richards's resignation. Abdullah was elected the chair, and Moorthy remained the secretary. Moorthy proclaimed that they had "definitely made a fresh start", with plans to set up branches of the SLP in the various electoral wards and rural areas. Abdullah pledged to make a "sincere and determined effort" to "revitalise the party in the interests of the working class". Manyam was officially made a member of the committee, alongside P. S. Dass and C. G. Ramakrishnan. K. Y. Foong was elected the treasurer. They replaced the General Council members who resigned with Richards. Moorthy stated that it had "almost become impossible" for the SLP to function with the vacancies, and that the election of their successors had been delayed by the party's preoccupation with the City Council election.

The SLP was then in a "parlous condition." According to researcher Saul Rose, nearly every "member of repute" had already resigned or been expelled by then. On taking office, Abdullah worked toward barring office-holders in the party from running in the general or local elections and establishing branches in each of the nine wards. The branches were to elect one delegate to the party's annual conference for every 50 members; this was to ensure that the conference would be "conducted strictly on constitutional lines" and to help "eliminate personality complexes which once seemed to strangle the party." This was an attempt to "make something of the wreck they had taken over." The annual conference led to several amendments to the party's constitution. After the event, he invited all former members of the party to rejoin, urging them to "come with a clean heart".

On 1 May 1954, the Singapore Socialist Party (SSP), a rival to the SLP, was officially founded by former members of the latter who had resigned or been expelled, including Thomas, Lim Yew Hock, Nair and Jaganathan. Moorthy attended the inaugural meeting, which he frequently "interrupted" with various questions. He later alleged that he had attempted to "prevent a permanent split among the socialists and workers in Singapore" through the formation of a second leftist party. He first suggested that a resolution be moved on whether the party should be formed, which he would have opposed, though this was denied. He then moved an amendment to the constitution stipulating that it work with the SLP, and this too was rejected, after which he left the meeting. Abdullah then accused the SSP of being "neither Socialists nor democrats" and attempting to capitalise on the "goodwill" of the working class towards the local labour movement.

In June, the Pan-Malayan Labour Party (PMLP) proposed that all Labour parties across Malaya unite under the larger party as regional divisions. On the proposal, the General Council of the SLP asked that it be given the "final say" in all Singapore matters. Moorthy, Abdullah, Lee and P. R. Williams attended the PMLP's annual conference, held in Penang, as the official delegates of the SLP. Two months after this, Abdullah announced that the party would vote on whether it should merge with the PMLP at its annual conference in September. It was then expected that the General Council would be against this, feeling that this would lead to the SLP becoming a "mere division" of the larger party. In July, Moorthy resigned as general secretary due to the "pressure of work", and he was succeeded by Victor J. Mendis and C. H. Koh as the organising and general secretaries, though he remained on the General Council.

=== Labour Front and aftermath ===
Despite the SLP's previous stance on the SSP, the former party announced that it would be merging with the SSP to form the Labour Front (LF) on 21 August. Three delegates from each party were placed on a committee with "over-all powers". The SLP's representatives on the committee were Abdullah, as well as Mendis, who had just returned to the SLP, and C. H. Koh, who together with Mendis succeeded Moorthy as secretary, who would later be appointed co-governors of the SLP with Thomas. It was decided that both the SLP and SSP would cease their independent activities and be merged completely by 1 July of the following year.

However, the candidates nominated by the LF for the 1955 Singaporean general election drew criticism from the SLP, which considered the list of candidates "injudicious" as it included several who had been members of neither the SLP nor the SSP. The situation worsened when an executive of the LF drew up a constitution and applied to officially register the LF as a political party, with the SLP wing now alleging that the LF had been established only as an "ad-hoc committee" to ensure that the SLP and SSP did not "step on each other's toes" in the upcoming election, and that the LF had now "overstepped its mandate" by registering the LF, thus implying the "dissolution" of both the SLP and the SSP.

The dispute culminated in Moorthy, Abdullah, Lee, S. S. Manyam, Chew, Ong and Ramakrishnan of the General Council voting in early November to withdraw from the LF, demanding that Koh and Mendis resign their seats on the LF's governing committee. The council then accused the LF's executive committee of having hidden "their real interests." Lee was elected by the council to act as the general secretary. As Mendis refused to resign from the LF, claiming that the withdrawal had the "effect of not only prejudicing but seriously hampering the cause of the masses", the six on the General Council voted to expel him. The Straits Times viewed this as the "death" of the SLP.

Mendis refused to withdraw from the LF, and the SLP quickly moved to expel him just days after the vote, though he in turn claimed to have quit the SLP, alleging that the SLP's withdrawal had the "effect of not only prejudicing but seriously hampering the cause of the masses for whom we work." Koh was expelled from the SLP in early January. Later in the month, Manyam was elected the president of the SLP, succeeding Abdullah. The party was by then in its death throes; only one candidate, Lee, was fielded for the Legislative Assembly general election in April, and with his loss to an LF candidate, Mak, the party lost all of its representation on the Legislative Assembly of Singapore. No one was elected to succeed Manyam on his death in June, and the party did not contest in any further elections. By February 1962, Moorthy was a member of the Singapore People's Alliance, a party founded by Lim comprising former members of the LF and the Liberal Socialist Party.
