= T. D. Richards =

Master mariner, politician and union adviser

Richards in 1950.

Thomas Davies Richards (1894 – 25 July 1958) was a master mariner, politician and union adviser. He served briefly as the chair of the Labour Party in Singapore and was the adviser to the various seamen's unions. He was named a "champion of Asian seamen" by The Straits Times on his death.

Born in Wales, he settled in Singapore around 1920, where he would remain for the rest of his life. A master mariner, he soon captained the Renong, a steamer which collided with the Selangor in 1926. He then became the master of a motor ship, the Coorabie, in 1946. In this capacity, he was apprehended in the Dutch East Indies in 1948 for having entered Tuban without permission and violating local import-export laws. Despite declaring his retirement around 1950, he continued as a mariner into the early 1950s.

Richards joined the Labour Party and initially announced that he would stand for election in the 1950 Municipal Commission election, though this did not manifest. He then unsuccessfully contested the Tanglin Division in the 1951 general election. He was elected the party's president in July 1953 at a time when it had suffered heavily from infighting, though he resigned just months after. He initially proposed 55 resolutions to be tabled at its annual conference, all of which were ultimately withdrawn. After just three months, he resigned from the party after failing to prevent the expulsion of C. R. Dasaratha Raj.

In 1954, he joined the newly formed Labour Front and was nominated its candidate for the Ulu Bedok Division in the 1955 general election. However, he was persuaded to withdraw his candidacy at the last minute to make way for the UMNO candidate in exchange for a nominated seat on the Legislative Assembly. When this did not materialise, he repeatedly criticised Chief Minister and party leader David Marshall, calling on him to resign, though he remained with the Front.

Throughout the 1950s, he served as the adviser to various seamen's unions, including the Malay Seamen's Union and the Malay Mariners' Union, and often spoke on the plight of Asian seamen, though he faced criticism over his claims that he represented them.

== Early life and military ==
Richards was born in the town of Fishguard in Pembrokeshire, Wales in 1894. He spoke Welsh as his first language and could not speak English in his younger years. As a result, he was "unable to learn" in school and "cussed out". Richards began his career as a deckhand, earning $2 a month. In 1917, he was employed by Headlam and Rowland as a first mate, being put on the SS John H Barry as a merchant marine in World War I. Davies also saw service in World War II as a marine in the United States Merchant Marine, and he later claimed that in this period he "made Captains and Chief (maintenance) Engineers out of absolute greenhorns in fifteen months flat." At the end of the war, he was the Chief Pilot for landing craft as part of the retaking of Malaya by the British. In both world wars he claimed to have witnessed Communism "in action" in Russia, finding the "loss of personal freedom" there to be "awful". After this, he volunteered to serve in the Korean War.

== Mariner ==
The SS Kajang in 1937.

Richards came to Malaya in about 1920 following the end of the First World War, and was employed by the Straits Steamship Company. He became the captain of the Medusa, a steamer. On 18 June 1926, he took command of the SS Renong, also a steamer. In this period, he made about 15 to 20 trips down the Perak River, both as a chief officer and master. On the early morning of 12 September, shortly after leaving the town of Bagan Datuk on the river, the steamer collided with the SS Selangor. It was found that the collision had arisen from the Renong giving a signal that had unintentionally misled the captain of the Selangor, who had not been "keeping a close watch". By May 1927, he had taken command of the steamer SS Calypso. He then took command of the Selangor in place of Franklin Caithness.

In the late 1930s, Richards took command of the steamer, the SS Kajang. On 29 September 1937, the Kajang collided with the Victory 11, a Japanese fishing vessel, off the coast of Borneo. The Kajang had left Sandakan for Labuan and Singapore with general cargo. The Victory 11, carrying 30 Japanese and five Filipinos, sank as a result, and were rescued aboard the Kajang after Richards took "prompt measures". In mid-1938, Richards came to Singapore and began working as a pilot aboard the SS Sirdhana of the British India Steam Navigation Company. On 13 November 1937, he piloted the vessel for some time before handing it over to the master, Philip Fairburn. The Sirdhana then struck a newly laid minefield in the Eastern Roads of Singapore and sank, leading to a loss of 20 lives. It was determined that the ship's officers had not "taken adequate steps" to ascertain the minefield's position. Fairburn's master's certificate was suspended for a year and the second officer was censured.

=== MV Coorabie ===
In August 1946, Richards took charge of the MV Coorabie, a British freighter, as master. In December 1948, the vessel entered the port of Tuban, then under the Dutch, without the permission of the government there. It was taken to and held at Surabaya as a result. He later recalled that the vessel had been on a return trip from Surabaya to Singapore, and that he had been ordered to enter Tuban on the order of the charterer Lim. Richards had initially been asked to leave for Singapore when the local authorities intercepted the vessel, though he claimed that the ship had "engine trouble" and would not be able to make the journey back without repairs. Richards was charged with entering the port without permission, to which he claimed that he had believed that he had obtained permission from an individual who claimed to be a "naval officer". Though he doubted the individual's authority, he took the job anyway, believing that he could obtain a permit to enter the port at Batavia. Unloaded arms and ammunition were found on the ship.

Richards was charged in May with exchanging oil, steel wires and tyres for palm oil and rubber while he was in the State of East Sumatra, which went against the local import-export laws. He claimed that he had not been aware of the restrictions against them. On 7 June, he was sentenced to four months in prison for the exchange and fined 10,000 guilders for entering the port after O'Brien gave evidence against him, and the ship was taken by the local authorities. He then lodged an appeal for the ship, though he did not appeal his own sentence as he "[was] British and [asked] no foreigner for anything." He stated that the crew in this period lived "like fighting cocks". The High Court in Singapore later determined that it was likely that the vessel had initially been detained solely for entering Tuban without a permit, and that the local authorities were prepared to let them be before they were notified of Richards's exchange.

While in Surabaya, Richards officially logged the chief engineer, Henry Laird O'Brien, with whom he was "not on friendly terms", for leaving the vessel for four days in February and for "trying to give away the ship to the Dutch", claiming that he had seen O'Brien with a Dutch Intelligence Officer. He claimed that this was the first time that he had logged someone. E. R. Anthonisz, who owned the ship, then sent Thomas Franklin to relieve Richards, who then went to reside temporarily in Surabaya, and negotiate with the local authorities. In 1949, O'Brien filed a lawsuit against Anthonisz, seeking $9,200, claiming that he had paid this out pocket to the crew of the Coorabie for their return to Singapore in July 1948. Anthonisz then filed a countersuit against O'Brien claiming damages for the loss of the Coorabie. O'Brien won his suit, with the judge finding there to be "no evidence" that O'Brien had "contributed to the forfeiture of the ship" and Anthonisz's countersuit was dismissed.

In February 1949, in Labuan, he became the master of the MV Sai Fong, earning $750 a month. The wooden vessel was owned by Refrigerated Sea Vessel Co., and he accepted the offer after meeting the managing partners of the firm. However, he soon found that the Sai Fong "required constant attention" and claimed that he had to pay $10 a day on average to keep it from sinking. In August, he filed a lawsuit against the firm, seeking $14,000 in back pay for him and his crew, as well as for recovery of all that he had spent maintaining the vessel. The High Court ruled in his favour, and he won $10,000 and an additional $1,000 in costs.

By July 1950, Richards stated that he had been retired for several months. However, he became the master of a steamer which went back-and-forth between Singapore and Borneo by early 1951.

== Politics ==
=== Labour Party ===
Richards joined the Labour Party (SLP), formed in 1948 to advocate for workers' rights by unionists, in particular M. A. Majid, P. M. Williams and M. P. D. Nair. It was the second political party active in Singapore at the time, after the Progressive Party (PP). The party was highly factionalised and suffered from frequent infighting, particularly between the factions led by general secretary P. M. Williams and president Lim Yew Hock. Richards was elected to the SLP General Council at its annual conference in June 1950.

==== 1950 election ====
At a meeting of the SLP's General Council on 24 July, Richards was nominated the party's candidate for the West Ward in the upcoming Municipal Commission election, to be held in December. S. M. Hussain, V. Rajaratnam, M. P. D. Nair and C. R. Dasaratha Raj were named the SLP candidates for the city, North, Rochore and South Wards, respectively, and the East Ward candidate was to be announced at a later date. Of the five, Richards was the only newcomer to politics. The party, which then had just two members left on the commission following the resignation of Pat Johnson, aimed to win all six seats up for grabs.

Richards was a staunch anti-Communist and claimed to have aligned with the SLP as he believed that Socialism would prove a "most effective counter to Communism" as it could "achieve the most in raising the condition of the working man." He was "chiefly concerned" with the high cost of food and believed that they could be cut by half for several categories. He was also a vocal critic of the Ghaut Serang system of recruiting seamen, claiming to have "proved at his own expense" that local fishermen could still be paid twice as much whilst cutting the price of fish in half. In response to the criticisms of Chew Hock Leong, the general manager of the Oversea-Chinese Bank, against the attitude of the United States towards the Rubber industry in Malaya, Richards opined that the Americans were "ultra-first-class goddam fools for buying even a single pound of our rubber since we go to suicidal extremes to avoid buying anything from America in return."

In mid-October, however, Richards announced that he would be withdrawing his candidacy for "personal reasons", alongside Hussain. Yap Chin Poh and M. A. Majid were selected to replace them, respectively. Lee Yong Min was named the East Ward candidate. He continued to participate in the SLP's campaign, speaking at an election meeting for Nair held at the Singapore Harbour Board quarters in Breeze Plain. He proclaimed that if the SLP were in power, consumers would get a "better deal" through lowered food costs. The SLP would also fight for higher wages and promote local industries. He suggested the establishment of a sugar factory, which the PP criticised. The following week, he spoke at a rally for Lee held at the Geylang English School, at which he compared the PP to the Conservative Party in Britain.

In the election, the only SLP candidate to win their seat was Nair, who triumphed over the PP's Chan Kum Chee to win a seat formerly held by the PP. Lee, Rajaratnam and Yap all lost to PP candidates while Majid lost to an independent.

==== 1951 election ====
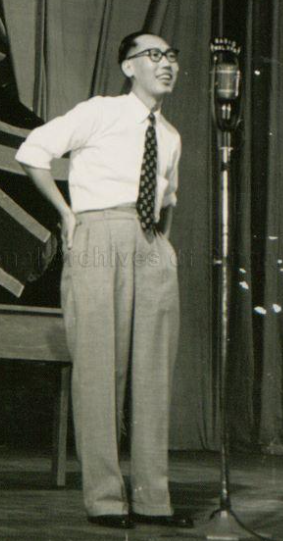
C. C. Tan, leader of the Progressive Party and Richards's opponent in Tanglin.

The SLP announced in February 1951 that Richards had been nominated to contest the Tanglin Division in the upcoming general election for the Legislative Council, which was to be held on 10 April. He was the first European to run for a seat on the Legislative Council on the SLP ticket. This meant that he would be contesting against C. C. Tan, the leader of the PP. He was to be his own election agent. Of the election's nomination centres, Tanglin's was reported to have been the "most quiet", with both Richards and Tan appearing without supporters to sign their nomination papers. Richards claimed that he would not challenge Tan's candidacy, even if he found "objections" in the latter's papers, stating that he would "let the voters decide." The SLP ultimately fielded candidates in seven of the nine divisions.

Richards issued his election manifesto on 7 April, calling for the promotion of industrialisation, particularly in the manufacturing of ships and engines, which he believed could be built in Singapore for "half the cost" while still being "streets ahead of any other manufacturing nation." He also called for the erection of paper and sugar mills and believed that rubber, tin, limestone and soda ash should be processed locally instead of imported elsewhere, thus "[lowering] the cost of living." Richards reiterated his pledge to reduce the cost of certain foodstuffs, facilitated through the building of landing crafts for their import and government-run shops through which they would be sold. He alleged that the PP would do little to help the 2,000 unemployed seamen in the region.

The Straits Times reported at the start of April that the Tanglin Division appeared to be the "quietest" of the election, with neither candidate having held election meetings by then, and only Richards putting up posters. Tan was expected to win. Just two days before the election, The Sunday Standard reported that neither Tan nor Richards had held any election meetings. It was finally reported by The Straits Times that Richards had left Singapore aboard his steamer several weeks ago and had since then been stranded in Borneo when the steamer ran into "engine trouble". His campaign had been run by his supporters. As such, he was also absent on the day of the election itself.

In the election, Richards received just 351 votes, behind Tan, who came in first with 1,416 and a "convincing" majority of 1,065. Tan's victory was the first result of the election to be announced. SLP supporters gathered outside the Victoria Memorial Hall mistook it to be an announcement of Lim Yew Hock's victory in Keppel. They began "cheering and rushing" into the hall and were then chased away by the officers stationed there.

==== SLP chair ====
Richards rejected suggestions that local "intellectuals" be given plural votes, finding that the "unintellectuals" were already significantly disadvantaged under the current system, noting that maritime workers now had to work 12 hours a day to support their families and thus could not longer afford to "put [their] ideas before the Government." In December 1952, he called for the introduction of proxy voting, claiming that there were 5,000 to 10,000 seamen alone who could not vote because they were away at sea, himself included. He stated that the SLP planned to address this. In that year, the General Council, which Richards was then not a member of, voted to expel Lim over a dispute that had arisen from the 1952 City Council candidates list, after which S. K. Reddi was appointed to succeed him. A 'rebel' faction of the SLP accused Williams of increasingly dominating party affairs and refused to accept the decisions of the General Council. This led to another split in the party.

In July 1953, Reddi claimed that party membership had fallen to just around 300, down from the thousands which it had previously claimed, which the Indian Daily Mail still considered doubtful. Several former leaders of the party had opined that the SLP was "long since dead or on the point of dying." The Daily Mail itself declared the party to be "of no use to the Colony." Reddi officially resigned on 21 July, opining that the party's situation was now "hopeless and intolerable" and that it had "ceased to exist as a coherent body in anything but name." He accused P. M. Williams of dominating party affairs behind-the-scenes through members of his faction on the General Council, outvoting Reddi on "every worthwhile issue" and preventing the party from achieving any meaningful progress.

On 25 July, the General Council elected Richards to succeed Reddi as the party chair. Shortly after this, he began drafting 55 resolutions, largely relating to "seamen, ships, ports and the Port Ordinance", to be tabled at the party's conference on 6 September. These included a call for the government to modernise the "third-rate daytime-only" ports of Malaya. He claimed that the region's "archaic methods of shiphandling" and the ports' daytime-only status contributed $1 million to the cost of living, and that the workers bore the brunt of this. Local shippers denied his criticisms, claiming that they were "too sweeping". Other resolutions called for the establishment of a local sugar mill, reducing the pilotage fee for the local harbour by 90% and forcing expatriate officers in the government to take long leave every four or five years instead of three so as to prove that they meant when they "[blathered] about loving Malaya".

Richards advocated for the reservation of certain sales assistant positions, which he described as "sissy jobs like selling silk panties", to unemployed local women, which he felt would grant them economic independence while simultaneously "[freeing] the men" for "some real hard work, to increase the country's wealth." He also suggested that every expatriate leave their families at home, stating that mariners "do it gladly" and that the expatriate "landlubbers" would "love it if they just tried it." He further proposed that all racehorse stables and car garages be repurposed as homeless shelters, which would force the "powers-that-be to soon bestir themselves to provide housing for the homeless, so that they can have their precious garages and stables back." However, in the week before the conference, it was announced that Richards had agreed to withdraw all of his proposed resolutions.

At the conference, Richards was re-elected the chairman. Reportedly for the first time in its history, over half of the members elected to the General Council were union leaders, including seamen's union leaders Karim Dzafir, who was elected the treasurer, and Mohamed Said Alias. In his address, Richards called for the party to "develop a common national feeling transcending all sectional and communal feelings." He called for reuniting Singapore with the Federation of Malaya and the abolition of nominated members on the City and Legislative Councils. He then reportedly "broke down" mid-address and sobbed as he proclaimed that the SLP would "serve the Malayan people as the British Labour Party had done Britons." He stated that the party was "alive and well" and that those who claimed otherwise were "rumourmongers". At the conference, there were calls for C. R. Dasaratha Raj, the sole SLP member on the Legislative Council, to resign from the council in protest of his non-inclusion from the Rendel Commission. Richards instead claimed that he wished to "give this commission a chance" and thus chose to "reserve" comments on it for the time being.

In October, several members of the General Council convened a meeting for 23 October to deliberate calling on Raj to resign from the Legislative Council. This was in protest of his non-inclusion from the Rendel Commission. Disapproving of the meeting, Richards attempted to call it off to no avail, stating that he "[knew] it would do nobody any good." After this, he resigned from the SLP in protest just three months after he had become its chair. He was followed by three other members of the General Council: Dzafir, Said Alias and George Joshua. An official of the SLP claimed to believe that the resignations "[would] not affect the party." The meeting itself was attended by just six members of the council and two ex-officio members, which was just enough to form a quorum, and the council voted to call on Raj to resign. The SLP secretary, E. S. Moorthy, then claimed that he had only received resignation letters from Richards and Dzafir. After this, the post of SLP chair remained vacant for two months before V. P. Abdullah was elected to succeed Richards.

=== Labour Front ===
On 1 May 1954, the Singapore Socialist Party (SSP), a rival to the SLP, was officially founded by former members of the latter who had resigned or been expelled, including Thomas, Lim, Nair and S. Jaganathan. The SLP announced that it would be merging with the SSP to form the Labour Front (LF) on 21 August. Three delegates from each party were placed on a committee with "over-all powers". The SLP's representatives on the committee were Abdullah, as well as Mendis, who had just returned to the SLP, and C. H. Koh, who together with Mendis succeeded Moorthy as secretary, who would later be appointed co-governors of the SLP with Thomas. It was decided that both the SLP and SSP would cease their independent activities and be merged completely by 1 July of the following year.

The SLP's leaders then drew up a list of candidates to contest in the 1955 general election, to be held on 2 April. Richards was nominated to contest in the Ulu Bedok Division. However, the candidates list drew criticism from the SLP, which considered it "injudicious" as it included several who had been members of neither the SLP nor the SSP. The situation worsened when an executive of the LF drew up a constitution and applied to officially register the LF as a political party, with the SLP wing now alleging that the LF had been established only as an "ad-hoc committee" to ensure that the SLP and SSP did not "step on each other's toes" in the upcoming election, and that the LF had now "overstepped its mandate" by registering the LF, thus implying the "dissolution" of both the SLP and the SSP.

The dispute culminated in Abdullah, Lee, S. S. Manyam, Moorthy, Chew, Ong and C. G. Ramakrishnan of the General Council voting in early November to withdraw from the LF, demanding that Koh and Mendis resign their seats on the LF's governing committee, though neither budged. The council then accused the LF's executive committee of having hidden "their real interests." 14 members of the LF who had been nominated as candidates, including Richards, alongside Lim, Jaganathan, Chew Swee Kee, Seah Peng Chuan, C. F. J. Ess, J. M. Jumabhoy, A. R. Lazarous, Mak Pak Shee, A. N. Mitra, H. A. Jivabhai, Lee Choon Eng, Tan Ewe Chee and J. C. S. Lim, signed a declaration of confidence in the LF and its executive committee, proclaiming that the latter was "working on the right lines towards building up the Front as a political arm for the masses."

==== 1955 election ====
In his election manifesto, released at the end of January, Richards outlined 30 pledges. He again proposed that stables and garages be used to house the homeles and pledged to fight for lowered taxes on "amusements" and locally-made cigarettes, harsher immigration laws to prevent "cheap labour" from putting locals "out of employment" and the introduction of a committee to prevent the wastage of taxpayer funds, which in his view included the "expensive banquets" thrown for both local and foreign dignitaries who were "already overfed", believing that a "soft drink and a bun" would suffice. The Singapore Free Press cited Richards's manifesto as an example of the "strange" campaigns of the election, finding his promise to reduce the wastage of taxpayer funds to be "admirable", though opining that his suggestion for dignitaries "[took] things a little too far." Other stances outlined in the manifesto included pledging to recall the $30 million "lying in London to back up the Colony's paper currency", advocating for Malayanisation, repealing of the Emergency Regulations, pensions for those above 55 or 60, a "maximum salary scale" of $850 a month and amenities such as schools and roads in rural areas. He was against the Provident Fund Ordinance, as he felt that it contributed too little to be effective.

In November 1954, the Malay Marine Officers' Association (MMOA) decided at a meeting on 28 November to support Richards's candidacy. In the ensuing months, he approached the various seamen's unions asking that they write to the LF to support Richards for nomination, though this was "generally turned down". On 20 February 1955, Richards held an election rally in Geylang Serai. His opponents in Ulu Bedok were to be Abdul Hamid Jumat of the Singapore branch of UMNO, Toh Seng Sit of the Democratic Party and Abdul Hamid Rahmat of the PP. However, 12 minutes before nomination closed, Mendis and Koh persuaded him to withdraw from the election to allow Jumat a "free run"; the LF had aligned itself with the UMNO-MCA-Malay Union alliance. Richards later recalled that, in exchange for his withdrawal, the pair had promised him a seat on the Legislative Assembly as a nominated member if the LF came into power. Mendis wished for him to stay in that role for a year, though he agreed only to a three- to six-month term, stating that serving on the assembly would see his monthly income reduced by $1000, which he "could not afford". He felt that the shortened duration was still enough to get a "fair deal" for local mariners. His supporters, primarily Asian seamen, were "angry" at his withdrawal, though he assuaged them by informing them of Koh and Mendis's promise.

Richards continued to participate in the LF's campaign, speaking in support of David Marshall, the party's unofficial head who was contesting against C. C. Tan in Cairnhill, at an election rally attended by about 100, staged at Empress Place on 14 March. He condemned the discrimination Asian seamen faced, claiming that they "lived in poverty" as the European seamen "[enjoyed] all the luxuries of life." He called for an end to their "exploitation" and felt that there would soon be a "social explosion" if it was not addressed. He spoke of his experience with linguistic discrimination in Wales and likened it to what the Malays faced in Singapore. He further insisted that he was "Welsh and not English", and that if Marshall again introduced him as such, Marshall would be "flirting with Bidadari." On election day itself, 2 April, the LF won in a major upset, winning 10 of the 25 seats up for election, with the PP, which had initially been projected to win, coming in second with just four seats. Marshall, who had defeated C. C. Tan in Cairnhill, became the first to occupy the post of Chief Minister of Singapore.

==== Dispute with David Marshall ====
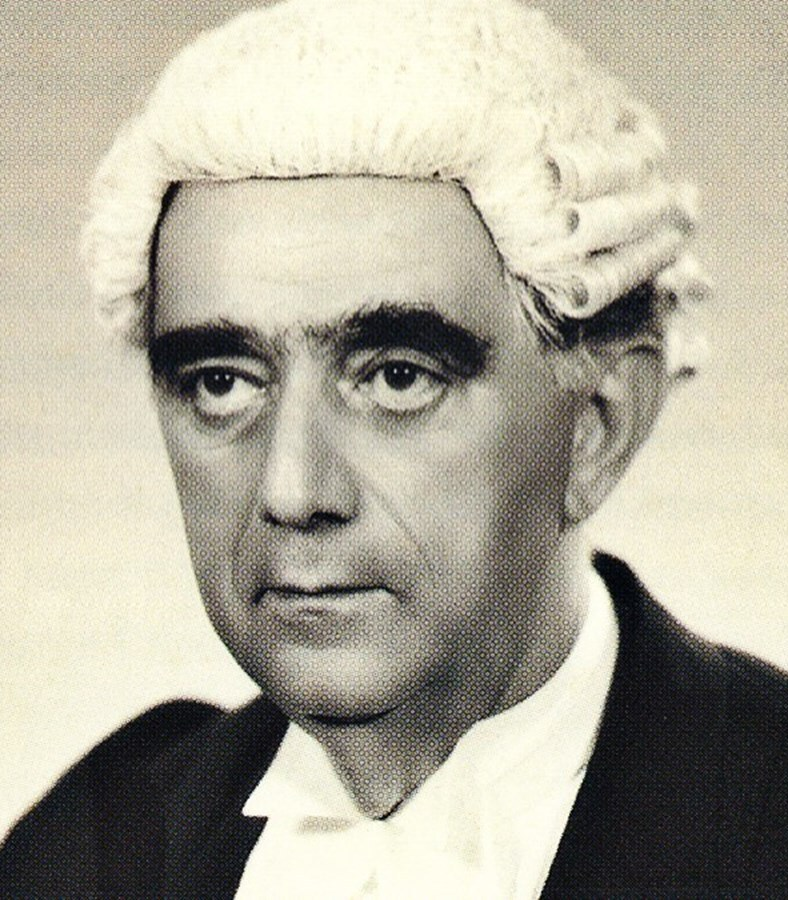
David Marshall, who was named Chief Minister with the Labour Front's victory in 1955.

At Marshall's first Meet-the-People Session, held on 19 April, Richards read out a letter he addressed to the former, calling on him to resign and have in his place a "tried Socialist elected member." He complained that the LF's leaders had failed to honour their promise, noting that Thomas and R. C. H. Lim had been nominated to the assembly instead. He believed that the Asian seamen had been "let down", and though there was "little a landlubber could do for them", he hoped that this "little" could be done by the LF, having previously written to Marshall asking him to address their concerns. Richards clarified that he intended to continue with the party and advance his cause from within, and that he would return for the next session if Marshall had yet to resign.

Marshall responded the next day, claiming that he had been unaware of the promise until after the election. After he had been informed, Marshall decided against nominating Richards as he felt that he had a "responsibility not only to his party but also the people of the country" in the selection. He believed that Richards would be inferior as an assemblyman to Thomas and R. C. H. Lim, and opined: "His public denunciation of my action seems to support my view." Richards rejected Marshall's claim that he had initially been unaware of the pledge and claimed that the waterfront was then a "time bomb", proclaiming that only a mariner could "help the Asian seaman." He further criticised the lack of women on the assembly, noting that there was already a woman in the LF who had been active in party affairs, calling the decision not to nominate her an "insult to every woman in Singapore."

At the next session, held on 25 April, Marshall revealed that he had explicitly rejected Richards's nomination when it had been raised to him. He then opined that he had done the "right thing seeing that [they could not] agree." When Marshall suggested that the latter support any other party instead, he emphasised his loyalty to the LF. Richards also questioned Marshall on the cancellation of a party he was to host at his Changi residence, and the latter claimed that the Attorney-General advised against this as it could be perceived as corrupt. At a session on 25 June, Richards made several claims regarding "shipping conditions and treatment" and the means by which Asian seamen were selected. Marshall rejected some of them and promised to look into the rest.

Dzafir, the general secretrary of the Malay Seamen's Union (MSU), rejected Richards's claim that he represented the Asian seamen, claiming that both Malay and Chinese seamen were already represented by unions, and that local seamen as a whole could already count on T. A. Simon, the Seamen's Welfare Officer, and T. A. White, the Seamen's Trade Union Adviser, who were both experienced mariners and unionists. Richards responded by noting that Dzafir was a "landsman" and claimed that 80% of local seamen were non-unionised, which he attributed to a lack of confidence in the seamen's unions. He then claimed that Marshall had requested from Richards a memorandum on the plight of local seamen, which he co-authored with Said Alias, the secretary of the Malaysian Ship Officers Union (MSOU).

The United Chinese Seafarers' Union (UCSU), which comprised the three Chinese seamen's unions, also strongly objected to Richards's claim that he represented the Asian seamen, claiming that "very few, if any" of the seamen knew of the claims to begin with and that none had supported his call for Marshall's resignation. The UCSU stated that they were not aware of anything Richards had done for the Asian seamen, opining that, to them, he was "an unknown element who has done nothing at all for them." The UCSU claimed that local seamen were already "rallying" behind White and asked that Richards stop invoking Asian seamen in his calls for Marshall's resignation.

In December 1955, Richards alleged that the LF's policies on multilingualism, abolishing the Emergency Regulations and the proposal for citizenship "[could not] honestly be said" to have been theirs. He claimed that he had suggested at an informal meeting that the assembly be bilingual, conducted in English and Malay. The proposal was mocked as it would have required an interpreter, though another member suggested supporting multilingualism, as the People's Action Party (PAP) had, to win over the local Chinese community in the election, which led to that being adopted as party policy. He recalled that he noted that this proposal would result in the need for "dozens of interpreters at least", though he was told that LF needed to "go all out for the Chinese vote."

When he questioned the necessity of the powers that came with the Emergency Regulations, he was told that they only affected "badhats", though it led to the suggestion that they, like the PAP, support repealing them, again to win over the Chinese vote. At another informal meeting, he queried the difference between naturalisation and the proposed Singapore citizenship, and it was decided that they would support the latter to win over the Chinese vote, with Richards, in recounting the event, "[having] a feeling" that the PAP's policy was also brought up in this instance. He claimed that all three of these policies had never been raised at an LF meeting before.

== Union work ==
Richards became the secretary of the Malay Mariners' Association. He went to Kuala Lumpur to attend the first annual delegates' conference of the Pan-Malayan Labour Party, held on 9 July, in an unofficial capacity, purely to speak on his observations on the plight of seamen in Singapore. He claimed that shipowners were "afraid" to hire Asian seamen as opposed to their European counterparts for fear of a boycott by the Singapore-Malayan Institute of Marine and Power Engineers. He felt that they were disadvantaged as they could not become members of the institute, which only admitted Europeans and Eurasians. He also claimed that Chinese engineers could not attain the rank of "chief engineers" on ships that were longer than 150 ft despite being qualified for the post, leading to a large disparity between the salaries of Chinese and European engineers. He urged the party to work towards ending this discrimination.

The Indian Daily Mail opined that Richards alleging the discrimination as a European made the matter "all the more serious", and then stated that most Europeans "[bossed] over" the Asian subordinates despite previously learning from them. The institute rejected Richards's claims as "serious and completely untrue", and alleged that it had done more for "local men, Asian and others" than any other organisation in the field. The Director of Marine for the Federation of Malaya then claimed that they were unaware of any "boycott" and that Asian seamen could attain higher ranks, provided they, in addition to several other prerequisites, pass the relevant examinations which were "difficult and [required] a sound basic education in the first place." Richards then claimed that the prerequisites posed an unnecessarily high barrier to local seamen and noted that there were no Malay harbour pilots, and though he conceded that they were not officially prohibited from attaining the post, he stated: "There is no law that debars a Malay — but just let him try and see how far he gets."

=== Malay Mariners' Union ===
In August 1953, Malay Seamen's Union (MSU) agreed to reunite with the Malay Marine Officers' Union, which split from the MSU in 1951, to form the Malay Mariners' Union (MMU). Richards was elected the General Adviser and Negotiator, under Dzafir as General Secretary and Osman bin Abdul Rahman as president. Together, the unions reported about 2,500 members. However, the Registrar of Trade Unions refused to recognise the merger on the grounds that they had lost the "amalgamation" ballot papers, though the MMU was later formed and he continued with both the MSU and the MMU as adviser.

At the end of September, it was announced that, as MMU adviser, Richards had been selected by the government to be a delegate to the Asian Maritime Conference, held in Nuwara Eliya, Ceylon from 5 to 15 October. He was to serve as the workers' representative, advised in the role by union leader Majid. The Indo-Malay-Pakistani Seamen's Union (IMPSU) and the Asian Maritime Officers' Union, both led by Majid, sent a letter to Colonial Secretary W. A. C. Goode in strong protest of Richards's appointment, claiming that, as he was a master mariner, he would "always [act] and [represent] the shipowners and their interests." The unions refused to recognise Richards as the delegate and considered the decision to appoint him "arbitrary and ultra vires and not in conformity with the International Labour Organisation's constitution." The IMPSU proclaimed that Majid would be the one advocating on behalf of the Asian seamen. The MMU denied their accusations and claimed that Richards was competent and would help to "institute a new deal for Asian mariners", in addition to pointing out that Majid was merely an adviser for the conference.

Richards issued a memorandum to Goode at the start of October asking for a "new deal" for local seamen, claiming that their low pay led to them becoming "violently anti-Government" and turning to smuggling to feed their families. He then claimed that seamen could earn $2,000 by smuggling a Communist into a country, and accused the shipowners of "encouraging in this way a seaman to use his ship to convey a Communist into Malaya". He also decried the poor working conditions and noted that the local harbour was a "dangerous raging fairway" that proved a "nightmare to any economy minded mariner."

In October 1954, he criticised the lack of accommodation for Asian seamen, which was contributing to the tuberculosis problem. He noted that the government had already promised the erection of a hostel for Asian seamen five years ago, though work on this project had not begun. The month after, The Singapore Standard credited him with bringing the plight of two local seamen suffering from tuberculosis to the attention of the press. At a conference held by White and the Singapore Master Attendant T. B. Low then claimed that it was Dzafir that instead deserved credit for aiding seamen suffering from tuberculosis. By that year, he also became the adviser to the MMOA. When the MMOA requested that seamen be allowed to vote by proxy, he claimed that he had raised the matter to the government on several occasions, to no avail.

A non-communal seamen's union, the Offices and Mariners Union, was founded in May 1955 with Said Alias as the secretary and Richards as the author. The pair authored a memorandum containing about 40 suggestions to Marshall as Chief Minister, of which a number were accepted, some with alterations. In September 1957, he submitted a memorandum to the Port Commission in which he made suggestions for quickening the loading rate for general cargo. Richards was also an adviser to the MSOU.

== Personal life and death ==
Richards was married and a teetotaler. After retiring as a mariner, he decided to spend his remaining years in Singapore as he "[could not] stand" the British climate. His wife, who lived in Wales, moved to Singapore some time after. By July 1950, he had written a book, Whither Malaya, in which he advocated for the rights of local workers. The book was then "in the hands of the printers." He was reportedly "very interested" in the novelist Joseph Conrad and claimed to know a son of William Lingard, a mariner active in Malaya who served as the inspiration for the character Tom Lingard in several of Conrad's novels. In 1955, he proclaimed: "I cannot find a single flaming landlubber in political circles who takes an intelligent interest in lowering the cost of living. That topic is taboo."

On 25 July 1958, Richards was using the telephone in a boarding house when he collapsed suddenly. The proprietor came in and found him "gasping for breath" over the desk, phone in hand. Though an ambulance was called, Richards had died by its arrival. His funeral was held the next day, after which he was buried at the Bidadari Cemetery. At the funeral, Port Chaplain Stuart McGee officiated while the pallbearers were members of the MSOU, many of whom were Asian seamen who wore white bands around their songkoks, a "mark of mourning for those of very high rank." Said Alias stated that Richards had won the seamen several "privileges", and that his death was a "terrible blow" to the MSOU. Gerald de Cruz of the LF claimed that Richards had worked to help seamen for three decades and called him a "great friend, a great comrade and a great man". Thomas was also present. His obituary in The Straits Times proclaimed him a "champion of Asian seamen", and The Singapore Standard stated that he had been a "well-known figure along Singapore's waterfront" for three decades.
