= Lee Yong Min (politician) =

Singaporean politician and unionist (1921 – 1993)

Lee in 1950.

John Lee Yong Min (1921 – 8 February 1993), also known as Y. T. Lee, was a Singaporean politician, union leader and businessman who served as the secretary of the Labour Party, as well as the general secretary of the Singapore Cinema and Entertainment Workers' Union and the Department of Civil Aviation Workers' Union.

Having joined the Labour Party at its formation in 1948, Lee became a member of the faction led by P. M. Williams, which increasingly dominated party affairs. He was elected to the party's General Council upon its founding and as the general secretary in 1954, and continued to serve in this post as the party waned and eventually ceased to exist. As a member of the party, he unsuccessfully contested the Municipal Commission election of 1950, the City Council elections of 1951 and 1952 and the 1955 general election. He was the sole Labour Party candidate in the lattermost election and the last to run on the Labour Party ticket overall.

Lee became the secretary of the Department of Civil Aviation Workers' Union on its founding in 1952, threatening to call for a strike on numerous occasions in this capacity. The year after, he also became the secretary to the Singapore Cinema and Entertainment Workers' Union in 1953. He called a strike in the middle of 1955 on two theatres owned by K. M. Oli Mohamed. He was soon arrested on charges of extortion in relation to this, but was eventually acquitted.

== Early life and career ==
Lee was born in Singapore in 1921. He received his education at the St. Joseph's Institution, where his teachers included Frank Caulfield James. At the age of 16, he went to work for a typewriter firm. By the early 1950s, he had become the proprietor of the Y. T. Lee Typewriter Service, which operated out of Bras Basah Road. He was also a social worker, serving as the vice-president of the Singapore Workers' Education Association and the treasurer of the Singapore Tenants' Association in that period. He moved into a part of the city which would later come to be within the East Ward and later the Geylang Division in about 1938.

== Politics ==
In 1948, Lee joined the Labour Party (SLP), formed in 1948 to advocate for workers' rights by unionists, in particular M. A. Majid, P. M. Williams and M. P. D. Nair. He was a founding member. It was the second political party active in Singapore at the time, after the Progressive Party (PP). The decision to form the party was made at a meeting in September. This was followed by a meeting on 27 November, at which a constitution was adopted by the party and an executice council, which was to lead the party, was elected. Lee was elected to this council on its formation, alongside 13 others, including Nair and Williams.

The party soon became highly factionalised, with major groups including a "left-wing", comprising members such as Williams, V. P. Abdullah, and E. S. Moorthy. Lee found himself aligned with this group. This faction of the party, considered more radical and comprising "white-collar office workers", was spearheaded in particular by P. M. Williams. They stood in opposition to a more moderate faction, the party's "right-wing", comprising mostly Chinese "professionals and businessmen", which came to be led in particular by Francis Thomas, a former chair of the SLP, and Lim Yew Hock.

A third faction, a "lawyer-group" led by Pat Johnson, the first SLP member to be elected to the commission and its leader on that body, and Victor J. Mendis, had led a walkout at the party's annual conference and the ensuing resignation after the group's bid to be elected president and vice-president failed. Lee was re-elected to the executive council, now the executive committee. With Johnson's resignation, this left two SLP members on the SLP council, E. V. Davies and S. M. A. H. Chisty, with the former being appointed Johnson's successor as the SLP head on the commission. In contrast, there were nine PP members on the commission and six independents.

=== 1950 election ===
On 28 August, Williams confirmed that, at the General Council meeting held the day prior, Lee had been nominated the SLP candidate for the East Ward in the upcoming Municipal Commission election. This meant that Lee would be contesting against his former teacher, James, who was with the PP. He was the incumbent, having been elected on a term expiring in December, and was seeking re-election. The SLP ultimately fielded candidates for all six seats up for grabs in the election, with the PP only fielding four in total. The other SLP candidates were Nair, Majid, V. Rajaratnam, Yap Chin Poh and C. R. Dasaratha Raj in the South, City, North, West and Rochore Wards, respectively. At an election meeting on 22 November, Lee claimed that, while he maintained his "respect and admiration" for James as an individual, voting for the latter would grant the PP a "victory", accusing the PP of "treachery" in their failure to deliver "higher posts for the local born" as they had previously promised. He declared members of the PP to be a "set of reactionaries" who were "desperately attempting to mask their lust for power". A key plank of his platform included clearing the local slums and rehousing their inhabitants.

Lee lost the election, held on 2 December, with just 610 votes. James had received 1,464, thus winning the East Ward seat with a majority of 854. In the election as a whole, the only SLP candidate to win their seat was Nair, who triumphed over the PP's Chan Kum Chee to win a seat formerly held by the PP. Rajaratnam and Yap both lost to PP candidates while Majid lost to an independent.

=== 1951 election ===
Chan Kum Chee, the Progressive Party candidate for the East Ward in 1951.

Lee was appointed to act as a vice-president of the SLP in 1951. In September, the SLP revealed four of its candidates for the City Council election in December. A. R. Lazarous, N. A. K. Jothi and Williams's brother P. R. Williams were selected for the North, South and Rochore Wards, respectively. Lee was again to run in the East Ward. Lee Choon Eng was later revealed as the candidate for the West Ward, V. K. Nair replaced Jothi as the South Ward candidate and the SLP did not field a candidate in the City Ward. At a meeting of around 50 residents of Katong, Mak Pak Shee, a former SLP member who had contested twice in the East Ward and had broken with the party together with Johnson and Mendis, was nominated to contest the ward once more, as an indepndent. Chan was then named the PP candidate for the ward.

In response to the proclamation of PP commissioner Amy Ede that it was not the commission's responsibility to repair the side roads of Geylang, known as the 'lorongs', Lee stated that the commissioners should order that they be repaired, even if they were on private property. He believed that the commission should either force the owners to repair them or declare them public roads, noting that he lived on such a lorong himself and that his was a "very poor lorong". Lee proclaimed at the first SLP election rally, held in Farrer Park in early November, that only the SLP could "improve the living conditions of the underdogs who are today being exploited by the few privileged people." In his manifesto, released in the middle of the month, Lee claimed that he would push for the improvement of roads in the city, in particular the 'lorongs' of Geylang and Katong, which were then "maintained in a most miserable manner." He also promised to fight for social security. The clearing of slums was again part of his platform.

Lee accused Mak of being a "renegade" who had repeatedly switched his political affiliation and Chan of having a "shameful" record within the PP, to which the latter challenged Lee to "name a public service" that he had done and Chan had not and one that he could do that Chan could not. In response, Lee noted that he had lived in the ward for years and claimed that he "knew the problems confronting the people there." The Straits Times reported that the East Ward was considered to be "strongly pro-Progressive", having already elected two PP candidates to the commission, and that Chan was thus expected to win the seat with a significant majority.

In the election, held on 1 December, Lee came second with 724 votes, just ahead of Mak's 720, though well behind Chan, who won the seat with 1,401 votes, granting him a majority of 677. The SLP otherwise performed well at the 1951 City Council Election, winning three more seats and bringing the total number of SLP members on the council to six. P. R. Williams, Lee Choon Eng and V. K. Nair won in the Rochore, South and West wards, respectively. They each won over a PP candidate. In March 1952, Lee was re-elected to the executive committee, now the General Council. He came sixth with 81 votes, behind P. M. Williams, Thomas, Abdullah, Teng Ling Siang and P. R. Williams.

=== 1952 election ===
By May 1952, The Straits Times reported that Lee was expected to once again contest the East Ward as a member of the SLP in the upcoming City Council election. With M. P. D. Nair's resignation from the SLP earlier in the year, the SLP then had five candidates on the council: Davies, V. K. Nair, Lee Choon Eng, Chisty and P. R. Williams. Of these, Davies and Chisty in the North and Rochore Wards, respectively, had been elected on terms set to expire in December and were looking to run for re-election. It was confirmed in July that Lee had decided to apply to run on the SLP ticket as a candidate in the East Ward, the only member of the SLP to do so.

==== Nomination dispute ====
It was initially announced that the General Council would finalise the nominations for the election at a meeting on 9 August. However, Lim announced on 27 July that the council had already decided to nominate SLP general secretary D. Stevens over Chisty for the Rochore Ward and Lee in the East Ward, the latter having faced no opposition in his bid. On 9 August, the General Council confirmed Lazarous as the candidate for the North Ward as opposed to Davies and P. M. Williams over popular union leader S. Jaganathan in the South Ward, though it had not yet determined candidates for the City and West Wards. The list of candidates was opposed by a "dissentient" group of the SLP, over 2,000 members strong, who disagreed with the selections of Lazarous, Williams and Stevens. This group felt that the General Council had been "prejudiced" in choosing to field Lazarous, Williams and Stevens and threatened a "mass resignation", calling for an emergency meeting on the matter.

Davies then claimed that the General Council was ruled by a 'clique', Williams's faction, which "lacked the confidence of the electorate". He revealed that the SLP allowed non-British subjects as members, and alleged that the annual conference earlier in the year was a "farce" that had been staged in part through bringing a "few lorry loads" of non-local members to vote for preferred candidates through a "stupid" constitution. He accused this General Council of attempting to control its members on the Legislative and City Councils and of making "fantastic pronouncements" for the SLP as a whole. He claimed to have not been aware of any action taken by the General Council which proved beneficial to the party, and felt that they were simply selecting those within their own faction as candidates.

A nine-member committee to represent 2,275 members of the SLP who disputed the selection was established. It submitted a memorandum addressed to Lim, who also opposed the list, on 20 August, stating that it "[could not] recognise the present Council as a valid body, nor [could they] accept decisions when it [had] so openly flouted the constitution, which it was elected to safeguard and honour". The committee accused the council of being "improperly constituted" and a "battleground for personal ambitions" which had done little to progress the "upliftment and welfare of the working class", with its first act since the conference being the expulsion of Davies and Chisty. The committee called for the council to be dissolved and considered its decisions "null and void".

Stevens then told The Singapore Free Press on 19 August that there was no such 'clique' on the General Council, which he claimed was "trying to manage party affairs in a just way." This was followed the day after by an official statement by the SLP denouncing Davies's accusations as "grossly unfounded", revealing that the General Council had voted for Lazarous over Davies eight to three as they felt that the latter's "frail" health could not "withstand the strain of elections". Additionally, the General Council attributed Lazarous's previous failure in the North Ward to the "lack of care and attention" Davies provided to his ward.

==== Expulsion of Lim Yew Hock ====
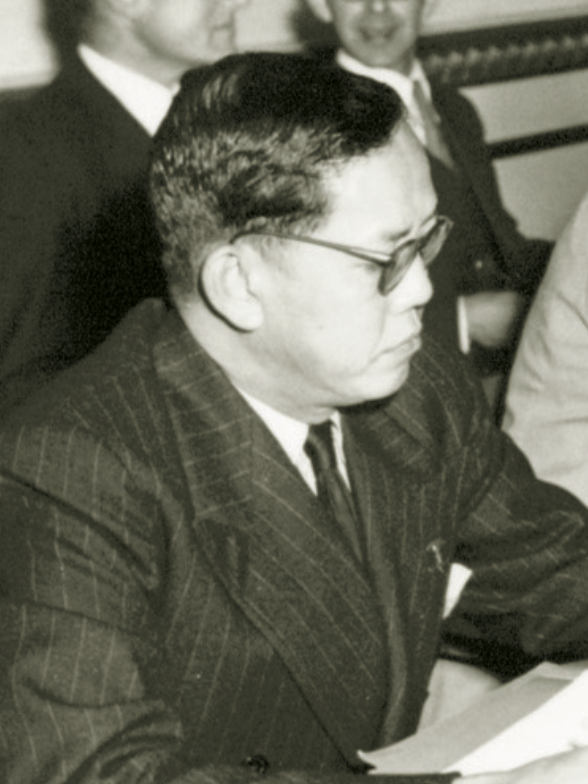
Lim Yew Hock, who was expelled from the Labour Party.

The "rebel" committee gave Lim two weeks to organise a general meeting to "straighten out matters", through which it planned to oust the General Council. Lim agreed to hold a meeting on 31 October, while the General Council worked to expel Lim as chair, declaring the meeting Lim called "unauthorised and unconstitutional." The Council was successful in this, kicking Lim out on 27 October at a meeting attended by all nine members of the council at the time, Abdullah, Lee, Stevens, Lazarous, Jothi, the Williams brothers, Reddi and Ho Wing Hon. S. K. Reddi was then appointed to act as chair in the meantime. This led to another major split from the party, in addition to reportedly "[convincing] the public of the utter hideousness" of the SLP.

After this, two members of the General Council, Stevens and Ho, announced their resignations from the body, claiming to have unsuccessfully fought against the decision to expel Lim, triggering a constitutional crisis: there were only seven left on the council, one less than was required to form a quorum as per the party constitution. Lim then proclaimed that Williams's faction of the General Council had "died an inglorious death two days after their glorious victory", and that there was now no way for the General Council to avoid holding that general meeting such that the council could be reconstituted. Over 800 members of the 'rebel' faction met at the Singapore Badminton Hall on 31 October and unanimously voted to express confidence in Lim as chair, and to call for the resignation of P. M. Williams. Reddi claimed the day after that the meeting's decisions were "invalid" as it was held unconstitutionally, and that, since Stevens and Ho's resignations had not been accepted, Reddi declared that the council was still "very much alive" with nine members.

Stevens, hoping to determine his exact position within the party, convened a meeting of the council for 8 November, during which he was to ask Reddi to accept his resignation and put forth a motion, giving the council a chance to withdraw Lim's expulsion and to reinstate the latter as party chair. However, at the meeting itself, Stevens was persuaded to stay on as the general secretary, Reddi was confirmed as Lim's successor as party chair and Jaganathan was expelled as he had confirmed that he would be contesting against Williams as an independent. Throughout, Lee was reported to have remained "loyal" to the General Council.

==== Campaign and results ====
The PP announced in September that incumbent Ede, who had been elected to the East Ward on a term ending that December, would be seeking re-election, and that the party would return to contesting all six wards. Mak announced at the end of October that he would again run for the East Ward seat as an independent. Two more independents, salesman V. S. Padmanabhan and merchant N. G. Nugawela, announced their intention to contest the ward. With five candidates vying for the same seat, this made the East Ward the "toughest contest" of the season. Lee, along with Ede and Nugawela, accepted a request from a group of Christian voters in Katong to attend a meeting at the Presbyterian Boys' School at Koon Seng Road where they were to be subjected to an "integrity test", which involved questions on topics such as their source of income. Speaking at an election rally, Reddi claimed that Lee would push for the opening of more schools, as well as better housing and living and working conditions for workers.

In the election, Lee received 854 votes, placing third, after Mak, who had 1,520, and Ede, who won the seat with 1,801 votes, though he was still ahead of Padmanabhan and Nugawela, who received just 306 and 260 votes, respectively. The SLP as a whole performed poorly. Of the four candidates fielded, only Lazarous won his seat. Stevens was defeated by Sim Beng Seng of the PP, and Jaganathan had won over Williams. In contrast, the PP won four of the seats. Reddi then proclaimed that he would "set about reorganising the party with a view to rejuvenating the rank and file", though the Standard felt that it was rather the SLP's leaders who were largely responsible for the SLP's defeat.

In the view of the Indian Daily Mail, the SLP's performance was "deplorable" yet expected, noting that Lee had now thrice unsuccessfully contested for the same seat. In the aftermath of the election, both Mak and Lee proclaimed that they would continue to fight for the seat, both claiming that they had received more votes with each election, with the latter stating that he "still [had] confidence that the East Ward [would] one day elect [him]." Conversely, the Daily Mail's read of the East Ward results was: "Of course, the more the rivals, the easier was Mrs. Ede's victory!"

=== 1953 conference ===
In July 1953, Reddi claimed that party membership had fallen to just around 300, down from the thousands which it had previously claimed, which the Indian Daily Mail still considered doubtful. Several former leaders of the party had opined that the SLP was "long since dead or on the point of dying." The Daily Mail itself declared the party to be "of no use to the Colony." Reddi officially resigned on 21 July, opining that the party's situation was now "hopeless and intolerable" and that it had "ceased to exist as a coherent body in anything but name." He accused P. M. Williams of dominating party affairs behind-the-scenes through members of his faction on the General Council, outvoting Reddi on "every worthwhile issue" and preventing the party from achieving any meaningful progress.

At the annual conference, several members introduced various amendments. Raj, then the sole member on the Legislative Council, introduced a motion calling for the General Council to be reduced from 21 members to 12, as well as for the conference to be held each year, and V. K. Nair proposed that M. P. Nair, Jaganathan and Lim be reinstated, though both motions were shut down. Lee was, once again, re-elected to the General Council. This was reportedly the first time half of the members elected to the General Council were union leaders, Lee included.

Lee, along with several other leaders of the party, convened a meeting to deliberate calling on Raj to resign from the Legislative Council in October. This was in protest of his non-inclusion from the Rendel Commission. Disapproving of the meeting, Richards resigned with treasurer Karim Dzafir and General Council members George Joshua and Mohamed Said Alias. The meeting was attended by just six members of the Council, Lee, Abdullah, Moorthy (now the general secretary), Chew Seng, Ong Eng Kheng and Stella Manyam, as well as two ex-officio members, Lazarous and S. S. Manyam. This was just enough to form a quorum, and the council voted to call on Raj to resign. Raj then opined that the Labour Party should be wound up as he felt that it was "non-existent." A resolution was moved in response to suspend Raj from the party for three months if he did not cease all his "political activities in the Colony".

Abdullah was elected the chair of the SLP on 26 December, filling the post which had remained vacant since Richards's resignation. Alongside Moorthy, he pledged to make a "sincere and determined effort" to "revitalise the party in the interests of the working class". The SLP was then in a "parlous condition." According to researcher Saul Rose, nearly every "member of repute" had already resigned or been expelled by then.

=== Labour Front and withdrawal ===
On 1 May 1954, the Singapore Socialist Party (SSP), a rival to the SLP, was officially founded by former members of the latter who had resigned or been expelled, including Thomas, Lim Yew Hock, Nair and Jaganathan. Abdullah accused the SSP of being "neither Socialists nor democrats" and attempting to capitalise on the "goodwill" of the working class towards the local labour movement.

In June, the Pan-Malayan Labour Party (PMLP) proposed that all Labour parties across Malaya unite under the larger party as regional divisions. On the proposal, the General Council of the SLP asked that it be given the "final say" in all Singapore matters. Lee, Abdullah, Moorthy and P. R. Williams attended the PMLP's annual conference, held in Penang, as the official delegates of the SLP. Two months after this, Abdullah announced that the party would vote on whether it should merge with the Labour Party of Malaya at its annual conference in September. It was then expected that the General Council would be against this, feeling that this would lead to the SLP becoming a "mere division" of the larger party.

Despite the SLP's previous stance on the SSP, the former party announced that it would be merging with the SSP to form the Labour Front (LF) on 21 August. Three delegates from each party were placed on a committee with "over-all powers". The SLP's representatives on the committee were Abdullah, as well as Mendis, who had just returned to the SLP, and C. H. Koh, who together with Mendis succeeded Moorthy as secretary, who would later be appointed co-governors of the SLP with Thomas. It was decided that both the SLP and SSP would cease their independent activities and be merged completely by 1 July of the following year. However, the candidates nominated by the LF for the 1955 Singaporean general election drew criticism from the SLP, which considered the list of candidates "injudicious" as it included several who had been members of neither the SLP nor the SSP. The situation worsened when an executive of the LF drew up a constitution and applied to officially register the LF as a political party, with the SLP wing now alleging that the LF had been established only as an "ad-hoc committee" to ensure that the SLP and SSP did not "step on each other's toes" in the upcoming election, and that the LF had now "overstepped its mandate" by registering the LF, thus implying the "dissolution" of both the SLP and the SSP.

The dispute culminated in Abdullah, Lee, S. S. Manyam, Moorthy, Chew, Ong and C. G. Ramakrishnan of the General Council voting in early November to withdraw from the LF, demanding that Koh and Mendis resign their seats on the LF's governing committee. The council then accused the LF's executive committee of having hidden "their real interests." Lee was elected by the council to act as the general secretary. As Mendis refused to resign from the LF, claiming that the withdrawal had the "effect of not only prejudicing but seriously hampering the cause of the masses", the six on the General Council voted to expel him. The Straits Times viewed this as the "death" of the SLP.

=== 1955 election and aftermath ===
At a general meeting on 15 January 1955, it was decided that the SLP would contest in the upcoming general election, to be held on 2 April. The SLP was also to function as a division of the PMLP, adopting the latter's constitution, and all of the members who had failed to withdraw from the LF were to be expelled. S. S. Manyam was elected to succeed Abdullah as chair and Lee was confirmed as the general secretary. The meeting was attended by about 100 members, though several more attempted to enter the meeting hall for lacking an invitation to the event and were thrown out as "intruders". They alleged that not every SLP member of the SLP had received an invitation, though Lee rejected this and SLP's leaders called the police on them.

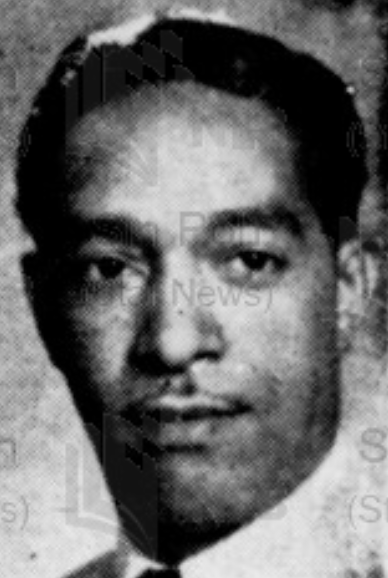
Mak Pak Shee, who contested the Geylang Division in 1955 as a member of the Labour Front.

The SLP initially decided, at a meeting on 2 February, to contest five of the 25 seats on the Legislative Assembly up for grabs. Lee was to contest in the Geylang Division, which was already to be contested by Mak, now with the LF, and businessman Goh Hood Kiat, who was running as an independent. A. A. K. Surattee, the SLP vice-president, was also announced as the SLP's candidate in the Pasir Panjang Division and the rest of the candidates were to be named in the next fortnight. The SLP then announced that it would consider allying with "certain political groups." However, on 24 February, Manyam announced that Surrattee had decided to withdraw and that the party would not be naming any more candidates, leaving Lee the sole candidate in the election running on the SLP ticket, though the party also planned to support independents Raj in the Kampong Kapor and C. S. Soh in the Havelock Divisions. Pawnbroker Lam Joon Chong of the Democratic Party was then announced as the fourth candidate in Geylang.

On 14 March, Lee released a 200-word long manifesto which was primarily an attack on the LF, accusing the party of being a "collection of renegades, traitors, opportunists and frustrated elements." He proclaimed that his opponents were "stooges of Colonial bureaucracy", stating that electing any of them would bring about "political chaos", calling Goh a Capitalist, Mak a "renegade" and Lam a "member of a party controlled by millionaires" who was contesting the election solely for the purpose of "protecting his Capitalistic interests". He claimed that none of his opponents could represent the working class, which formed the bulk of the electorate, and that he was best suited for this as he was a "Labour man and a poor man".

Lee noted that he had lived in the area for two decades and promised to "champion the people's rights." Lee claimed to advocate for "immediate" independence and the unification of Singapore with the Federation of Malaya, and stated that he would support industrialisation, the creation of a multilingual legislature, repealing the Emergency Regulations and revising the Trade Union Ordinance, as well as government-funded employment benefits and pensions and compulsory education. He once again stated that he "knew the problems" faced by the area's inhabitants and stated that he was "in a position to fight for them." Between 19 and 20 March, he held eight rallies across the district.

In the election, Lee came third with 1,325 votes, ahead of Lam with 1,226, though behind Goh, who received 1,386, and well under Mak, who won the seat with 2,756 votes, a majority of 1,370. The LF performed the best out of any party in the election by far, winning 10 seats, with the PP coming in second with just four. With Lee's loss, the SLP lost all of its representation on the Legislative Assembly of Singapore. No one was elected to succeed Manyam on his death in June, and the party did not contest in any further elections, thus making Lee the last candidate to run on the SLP ticket. In late January 1958, Lee announced that the SLP was "still in existence", though it "had been quiet." He claimed that there were still several members on the General Council, and that they planned to regroup and revive the party, though he stated that it was "too early to say more". He was then still the general secretary. However, the SLP failed to re-register on the passing of the Societies Ordinance in 1960, thus officially ceasing to exist.

== Union work ==
=== Department of Civil Aviation union ===
In October 1952, the Department of Civil Aviation Workers' Union (DCAWU) was formed to represent all workers at the local Department of Civil Aviation. Lee was its founding secretary. Though the president was Abdullah Sani, the union was ultimately led by Lee. On 19 January 1953, Lee announced that the union would consider calling for a strike hoping for increased wages for the workers, claiming that, after talks with government negotiator J. C. Griffiths, the union believed that any further talks would be unproductive. Lee accused the talks with Griffiths with having been designed to delay meeting the union's demands, noting that, while Griffiths had acknowledged the "anomaly" of the workers' salaries during the meetings, nothing "[seemed] to have come out of the meeting."

The DCAWU came together with the Singapore Medical Workers' Union and the Singapore Government Seamen's Union to boycott the Ritson Commission, set up to investigate the salaries of government employees, believing it to be "irrelevant to [their] case". The unions instead pushed for the government to implement the recommendations of the Benham Committee, comprising F. C. Benham, George Oehlers and Davies, which had been rejected. The Council of Government Industrial Workers' Union was established to represent the three unions, as well as any other union representing government employees that wished to oppose the Ritson Commission; Lee was elected the council's chair and P. M. Williams its secretary.

On 22 May 1953, Lim, the president of the Singapore Trade Union Congress (STAU), proposed that there be seats on the Legislative Council reserved for "workers' representatives". This was opposed by several union leaders, including Lee, who felt that the "policy of reservation of seats in the Council is aimed at exploiting the majority by the minority." In September, Lee served as the spokesperson for several unions, including the DCAWU, which were protesting the decision to appoint Lim as the Singapore workers' representative at the International Labour Organization talks in Japan.

In August, he wrote to the Colonial Secretary, William Goode, to complain of senior officers of the government "disrupting" the DCAWU for having broken away from the Council of Action in boycotting the Ritson Commission, asking him to state if the government was involved in "breaking up movement." He claimed that these officers had told the union that they would not be entitled to any of the benefits implemented on the commission's recommendation if they were not with the council, and threatened to escalate the matter to Oliver Lyttelton, 1st Viscount Chandos, the Secretary of State for the Colonies, if he did not receive a "satisfactory" response.

Lee was initially the representative of the DCAWU in the talks of the Federation of Government Employees' Union on the proposed National Whitley Council. However, Lee was asked to leave the meeting, and R. K. Palaiyan, the secretary of the Singapore Government and City Council Labour Union, alleged that this was part of a "conspiracy" to exclude the DCAWU and two other unions from the talks. The Federation of Government Employees' Union denied this and instead claimed that Lee had been asked to leave due to his involvement with the SLP as a member of its General Council, and that the DCAWU could appoint another representative who was not politically involved.

Lee wrote to Goode in July 1956, again threatening to call a strike for the union, which then represented 250 workers, due to the "hostile" attitude he alleged the Government had shown toward the DCAWU. He claimed to have sent two letters to the government earlier in the month, receiving no response. By December, he had been succeeded by Sani as the union's secretary. The union's certificate of registration was revoked in 1959.

==== Kallang Airport watchmen ====
In February 1954, Lee claimed that about 100 drivers and firemen at the Kallang Airport were being made to work long hours without any weekly holidays, stating that three of the firemen there had been fined and punished for going on their weekly holiday. At the start of September, the government notified seven watchmen at the airport that they would be fired on 30 September, after which their positions were to be replaced by a trained constabulary. The DCAWU then threatened to call a strike at the airport if the workers were not reinstated in their posts or employed at another department, with Lee proclaiming it a "moral crime" to dismiss the workers after they had served in the post for several years.

Delegates of the union met with C. W. Lyle, the acting Commissioner for Labour, and J. H. D. Neill, the Assistant Commissioner for Labour (Conciliation), and it was decided that they would then meet with F. H. Pollock, the Operations Officer (Administration), and Lee Siow Mong of the Colonial Secretary's Office. It was then announced that the seven watchmen would be dismissed in October instead, and that efforts would be made to find "alternative employment" for the fired watchmen, as well as for another eight watchmen who would soon be dismissed. Lee claimed that the union was satisfied with this, though the union would call for a "lightning strike" if these promises were not honoured.

=== Cinema and Entertainment union ===
The Singapore Projectionists and Electricians Welfare Association became the Cinema and Entertainment Workers' Union (C&EWU) in April, representing all workers in the local entertainment industry, with the stated goal being to have a single body represent and protect the welfare of all workers in the industry. Lee became the union's secretary on its founding. The Cabaret Hostesses Association was also invited to merge with the newly formed union, and if it accepted the offer, the union's membership would have increased to beyond 3,000. A month after its founding, the union awarded Lee a gold medal for "services rendered to the union since its inception."

Lee appealed to the employees of the Malay Film Productions studio when it was suggested in August that they unionise, though they ultimately decided on forming their own union, the Persatuan Artis Malaya. He was still the secretary at the end of 1957. The union's certificate of registration was cancelled by the government in 1959 as the "members had gone to another union."

==== 1955 strike ====
K. M. Oli Mohamed, the owner and proprietor of the Taj Cinema and the Diamond Theatre.

In mid-May 1955, Lee delivered an ultimatum to the managers of the Taj Cinema in Geylang Serai, owned and operated by merchant K. M. Oli Mohamed, demanding that the theatre improve the working conditions of its 40 employees and threatening to call a strike. There were then four separate ongoing strikes in Singapore and another three unions threatening to call a strike. The C&EWU's demands then included increasing the workers' salaries and a "general revision" of their conditions of service. The threat "fizzled out" on 20 May when a settlement was reached between the union and the theatre's management, with the latter agreeing to give all employees a 30% pay rise.

Despite the settlement, 14 of the workers walked out anyway on 5 June due to a "misunderstanding". On the same day, 18 employees at the Diamond Theatre, also owned and operated by Oli Mohamed, threatened to walkout if their demands were not met "immediately", to which the theatre's management agreed. The Taj's management officially approved a pay rise for the 40 employees on 6 June. On 12 June, representatives of the C&EWU met with the management of both theatres at the Ministry of Law on 13 June to negotiate a settlement regarding the union's demands for "improved conditions of service." Toward the end of the month, the union again threatened to call a strike if the management did not concede to its demands.

The workers at both theatres went on strike on 24 June. Oli Mohamed then claimed that he had "accepted with but slight modifications" all of Lee's demands. He then dismissed all of the workers and hired a new staff team at the Diamond by the end of the month, though the Taj remained closed. The 13 former employees of the Diamond picketed the theatre, claiming that the management had "broke an agreement." Oli Mohamed called the police to monitor the picketers, claiming that they had intimidated the new staff, though Lee denied this. One picketer was arrested for intimidation on 28 June, though this reportedly had no effect on the situation. The C&EWU met with David Marshall, the Chief Minister of Singapore and head of the LF, on 5 July, seeking his assistance in resolving the dispute. On 10 July, Lee proclaimed that the workers would continue to picket until they had been rehired, though Oli Mohamed stated that there were now no vacancies for them.

Lee was then arrested and charged in the Fourth Magistrate's Court on 14 July with extortion and attempted extortion. It was alleged that he had ordered two of Oli Mohamed's employees at the Taj, who had been looking after the business while Oli Mohamed was away in India, to pay him $250 on 20 May in addition to heeding the union's demands, threatening to call the strike if they did not do so. The two employees claimed to have done so "in fear of injury" to the business, particularly as the strike would disrupt the theatre's business during the Hari Raya season. It was further alleged that he had attempted to extort another $250. The magistrate, J. M. Devereux-Colebourn, did not take any plea and postponed the case to 21 July, and Lee was released on bail of $1,000. Leslie Rayner served as his counsel. Devereux-Colebourn then scheduled the trial for 1 December due to "congestion" in the courts, which Rayner unsuccessfully fought against.

The trial finally began on 14 May 1956. The two employees then claimed that Lee had initially personally asked for $500 in addition to the union's demands. With Oli Mohamed away, they could not agree to giving the employees a pay rise, and instead paid him $250, promising to give him the rest of the money on 6 June, after Oli Mohamed's return. However, they claimed that the latter refused to give Lee another $250 on returning to Singapore, and that this led Lee to call the strike. According to one employee, he had only reported the matter to the police after Oli Mohamed had ordered him to. The police then revealed that there had been a fourth man present at the negotiations between Lee and the two employees who would appear at the next hearing as a witness. The man, a clerk with the Public Works Department, proved to be a hostile witness and claimed instead that Lee had never demanded any money for himself, and that negotiations between the three had reached a "deadlock" before he stepped in to reason with them, thus resulting in a settlement. The clerk stated that he had not told this to the police before as he was "afraid a case would be brought against [him]." The trial then "abruptly ended" and Lee was acquitted of the charges.

== Personal life and death ==
Lee was married with two daughters. He died on 8 February 1993. The mass was held at the Church of Our Lady Queen of Peace on 11 February, after which he was buried at the Christian Cemetery at Choa Chu Kang.
