= S. K. Reddi =

Singaporean lawyer and politician (1910–1982)

Reddi in 1953.

S. K. Reddi (1909 or 1910 – 1982) was a lawyer and politician who served briefly as the chair of the Labour Party in Singapore and was involved in an early attempt to form the Sarawak United Peoples' Party in Sarawak.

Arriving in Malaya in the 1920s, Reddi received his education there before leaving for the United Kingdom, where he trained as a lawyer. He then travelled across Europe, where he became involved in politics. He came to Singapore in 1947 as the Registrar of the Representative for the Government of India, remaining in this post for half a decade before stepping down to practice law.

In Singapore, Reddi also became involved with the Labour Party, which was highly-factionalised and suffered immensely from infighting. After the party's General Council's vote to expel chairman Lim Yew Hock, the party entered a severe crisis and Reddi was appointed first acting chair and then Lim's official successor in late 1952. Though he attempted to stabilise the situation and re-organise the party, he eventually resigned from the post in mid-1953, accusing P. M. Williams of dominating party affairs behind-the-scenes and finding the party's position to be "hopeless", stating that it had "ceased to exist in everything but name."

Reddi moved to Sarawak in the mid-1950s and established his own legal practice in Kuching, going on to become a prominent figure in the legal scene there. He remained politically active and gathered with Ong Kee Hui and Stephen Yong Kuet Tze in 1956 to form a multi-racial party. This failed, though Ong and Yong would eventually succeed in establishing the Sarawak United Peoples' Party.

== Early life and education ==
Reddi was born around 1910. He was the son of civil servant A. S. Reddi and grew up with a brother, S. G. Reddi, who studied as an electrical engineer. He and his family moved to British Malaya when his father became a Tamil interpreter for the government of the Straits Settlements, eventually rising to the post of Assistant Controller of Labour in Malacca. He received his education at the St. Xavier's Institution in Penang, where he was president of the Literary Union. Reddi and his brother left for Europe in January 1930 to pursue further studies; he planned to study law.

In 1931, Reddi was admitted to The Honourable Society of the Middle Temple in London, through which he was called to the Bar. From 1932 to 1936, he "travelled extensively" across Germany and Switzerland, attending student conferences which served as his political awakening. Reddi attended speeches by British political figures Herbert Morrison, Joseph Kenworthy, 10th Baron Strabolgi and George Lansbury in this period, which contributed to this, though he also claimed to have never "[come] under the influence of any one man." He became involved with V. K. Krishna Menon's India League in England.

== Singapore ==
=== Legal practice ===
Reddi came to Singapore in 1947 as the Registrar at the office of the Representative for the Government of India in Singapore, working there for about five years before resigning from the office at the end of January 1952 with the intention of practising as a lawyer. He was temporarily succeeded there by V. S. Pillay. He then went to work as a barrister at Braga & de Souza, the legal practice of A. J. Braga and Fred de Souza. He was admitted to the Singapore Bar by Chief Justice Charles Murray-Aynsley on 11 August. He continued to practise law into mid-1955.

==== Unions ====
He then became the legal adviser and negotiating officer to the Naval Base Labour Union, representing 10,000 workers at the Singapore Naval Base in Sembawang. At the end of the year, the union threatened to strike if the Admiralty did not negotiate with them at a proper industrial court. This would have, reportedly, made it the first time a dispute between a "Crown employer" in the Far East and its employees was referred to an industrial court. The strike threat was in spite of strikes then being outlawed under the Emergency Regulations. The Admiralty agreed to have the case referred to an industrial court, and the union decided to call off the strike for a week after two "heated" debates involving the union's leaders and representatives, as well as Reddi.

As arrangements had yet to be made for the case to be heard in an industrial court, the workers went on strike on 29 December. Reddi met with Colonial Secretary W. L. Blythe the next day, hoping to settle the matter. However, no official statement was issued following the meeting, and Reddi did not comment on its outcome. As such, it was then reported that the government might intervene in the strike. Reddi revealed in early January that he had decided to bring the issue to the Governor of Singapore, John Nicoll, and that, after negotiations with Nicoll, the Executive Committee was considering accepting a compromise regarding the dispute. This strike ended on 7 January with Nicoll agreeing to send the dispute to an industrial court.

Later that month, he became the negotiator and spokesman for the Mental Hospital Uniformed Staff Union, which represented attendants at the Woodbridge Hospital who went on strike at the end of the month. He attempted to settle the dispute after Chew Seng, the secretary of the Singapore Trades Union Congress, failed to, though he was also unable to resolve it then. The strike was called off early in February, and he continued to participate in negotiations between the union and the government.

=== Labour Party ===
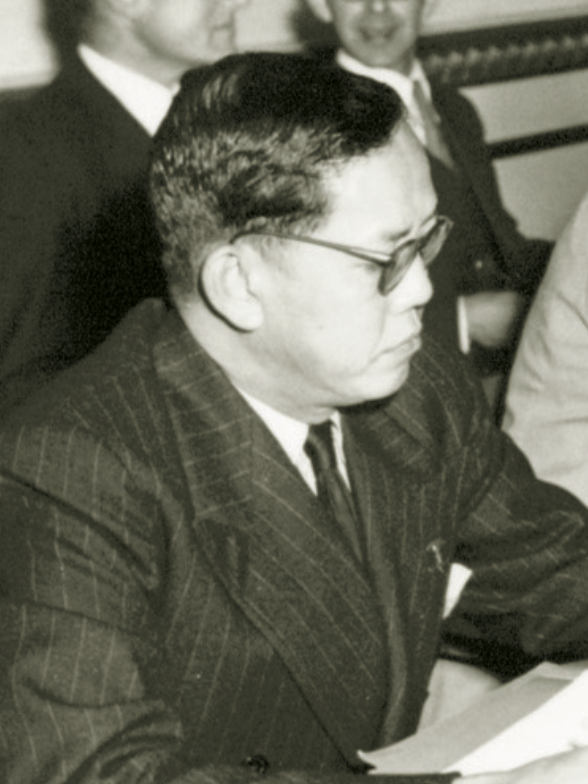
Lim Yew Hock, Reddi's predecessor as Labour Party chair.

Reddi joined the Labour Party (SLP), formed in 1948 to advocate for workers' rights by unionists, in particular M. A. Majid, P. M. Williams and M. P. D. Nair. It was the second political party active in Singapore at the time, after the Progressive Party (PP). The party was highly factionalised and suffered from frequent infighting. In July 1952, it was announced that Reddi was considering standing as a candidate in the upcoming City Council election. The SLP then had five candidates on the council: E. V. Davies, V. K. Nair, Lee Choon Eng, S. M. A. H. Chisty and P. R. Williams. Of these, Davies and Chisty in the North and Rochore Wards, respectively, had been elected on terms set to expire in December and were looking to run for re-election. Reddi was to apply to run on the SLP ticket as a candidate in the West Ward. Francis Thomas, the founding chair, was also reportedly considering applying for the same seat. However, only one SLP member ended up applying for the West Ward, George Parambil, and the party ultimately did not field a candidate for the ward. Neither Thomas nor Reddi contested the election.

The list of candidates selected by the General Council to contest the City Council election was revealed at a general meeting on 9 August. The list was opposed by a "dissentient" group of the SLP, 2,000 members strong, who disagreed with the selection of SLP general secretary P. M. Williams over union leader S. Jaganathan to contest in the South Ward, of SLP treasurer A. R. Lazarous over Davies in the North Ward and of SLP secretary D. Stevens over Chisty in the Rochore Ward. This group felt that the General Council had been "prejudiced" in choosing to field Lazarous, Williams and Stevens and threatened a "mass resignation", calling for an emergency meeting on the matter. Davies contributed to this by alleging that the General Council was a 'clique' which dominated party affairs.

A nine-member committee to represent 2,275 members of the SLP who disputed the selection was established. It submitted a memorandum to SLP president Lim Yew Hock on 20 August, stating that it "[could not] recognise the present Council as a valid body, nor can we accept decisions when it has so openly flouted the constitution, which it was elected to safeguard and honour". The committee gave Lim two weeks to organise a general meeting to "straighten out matters". Lim agreed to hold a meeting on 31 October, while the General Council worked to expel Lim as chair, declaring the meeting Lim called "unauthorised and unconstitutional." The Council was successful in this, and this led to another major split from the party, in addition to reportedly "[convincing] the public of the utter hideousness" of the SLP.

==== Chairman ====
With Lim's expulsion on 27 October, the General Council elected Reddi to act as the chair of the SLP in his place. He was then still considered a "recent arrival" in local politics and James Wickenden of The Straits Times reported that "no-one was more surprised than Reddi" at this appointment. The committee proclaimed their support for Lim instead, stating that the General Council had proved "beyond doubts that they do not enjoy the confidence of the members of the Party or the Singapore public", and as such they would "take no notice of any decisions taken by the council." On taking office, Reddi opined that the SLP lacked "intelligent and educated leadership". To remedy this, he proposed hosting informal readings of the works of the Labour Party in the United Kingdom at his house, though this was met with little interest beyond an endorsement from P. M. Williams. He noted that the party was "dominated by Indians" and hoped more Europeans and Eurasians would join to help give it a "sense of responsibility".

P. M. Williams, who was confirmed as the Labour Party's South Ward candidate in 1952.

Reddi maintained the validity of Williams's nomination and refused to recognise Lim's authority over the party, and to adopt a "wait and see" approach with regard to Lim, though he claimed to be willing to negotiate with both Lim and the committee. Wickenden felt that it was unlikely that Reddi would be able to resolve the crisis without a general vote on the matter, though he felt that it was possible that Reddi could demonstrate the "value" of "working on party lines" and that Lim's reaction had been too extreme. He opined that appointing Reddi was a "serious step" in resolving the issue as he appeared to demonstrate the necessary "stability and common-sense", and noted that Reddi's background made him "suitable" for the position.

The council confirmed Reddi as acting chair at a meeting on 8 November. He then defended the council against allegations that it was "defunct", instead stating it was "much alive". He served Williams's official proposer as a candidate on nomination day. At the SLP's first rally of the season, held at Farrer Park on 10 November, he stated that the council would "put up a united front" to save the party from "political bankruptcy", and that the council "[would] not subdue itself to threads from any group of members." He then proclaimed that only the council could guide the party and that it would continue to advocate for self-governance. In response to comments by Lim, Reddi stated that Lim's decision to hold a general meeting over nominated candidates was irregular and claimed that Williams had "more confidence" in SLP members than Jaganathan, who was contesting in the South Ward against both Williams and the PP's S. M. Vasagar as an independent. Reddi was then accused of "seeking power" in accepting the post of acting chairman, which he denied.

In the election, the SLP performed poorly. Of the four candidates fielded, only Lazarous won his seat. Lee Yong Min was defeated by PP incumbent Amy Ede, Jaganathan had won over Williams, and Stevens, who contested in the Rochore Ward against a now-independent Chisty and the PP's Sim Beng Seng, lost to the latter. In contrast, the PP won four of the seats. Reddi attributed the party's performance to the splitting of votes by independents and the "rift" in the party, which disrupted the party's campaign. He then proposed holding a general conference "to put our house in order" and bridge the gap between the rival factions of the party, claiming that the party was "disappointed but not disheartened" and hoped to see it "pull up its socks." Instead, however, the committee threatened to hold a general meeting to overthrow Reddi and the council. The committee then had the support of both Lim and a "rebel" group of SLP members on the City Council led by V. K. Nair.

On his visit to Singapore, Saul Rose, a scholar who was then the International Secretary of the Labour Party in the United Kingdom, met with Reddi and the General Council and recommended that Lim's expulsion be withdrawn, and in return Lim would hand over items of the SLP which had been kept with him, including a "large number" of member application forms. Reddi announced shortly after that all former SLP members, including those expelled or in the "rebel" faction, could apply to rejoin the party. The Straits Times then reported that it was generally believed that he planned to go along with Rose's recommendations in an attempt to reunify the SLP. However, the party continued to face several crises as more members resigned.

==== Resignation ====
In early July 1953, Reddi initially announced that the newly reconstituted General Council of the SLP would be selecting candidates to contest all six wards in the City Council election, held later that year, at a general meeting on 18 July. He asked that SLP members "forget their differences and personal loyalties" and "give the general council a chance" to steer them through the election. The SLP's "rebel" faction then threatened to nominate its own candidate for the South Ward, and Reddi announced in response that he would seek to negotiate with this faction. The faction protested against the delay of the party's annual conference, which had initially been scheduled for July and which, according to Reddi, had to be postponed, and demanded that the meeting to select the candidates be held "immediately".

Reddi scheduled a Party Council meeting, the first in a "long time", for the night of 18 July, though he soon found the day before that none of the councillors had been told of the meeting despite him instructing Stevens to inform them of it. He then declared that he would resign if the meeting had to be postponed. Seven members of the General Council arrived for the meeting and found that neither Reddi nor Stevens were present, thus forcing the meeting to be postponed. The day after, Reddi claimed that it was the rest of the General Council that was absent, stating that he and Stevens had arrived at the SLP office at 7.30 p.m. and found only C. R. Dasaratha Raj, the party's sole member on the Legislative Council, and that when the pair left to retrieve the minutebook, Dasaratha Raj had too disappeared. An attempt was then made to reschedule the meeting to 25 July.

The Indian Daily Mail suggested that this was a "stunt", designed to "secure some publicity" for the SLP's leaders, and opined that it revealed the party leaders' "utter irresponsibility and indifference to the party and to whatever cause it claims to champion." It also noted that Reddi claimed that party membership had fallen to just around 300, down from the thousands which it had previously claimed, which it still considered doubtful. The Daily Mail reported that the SLP had been accused of being "only alive during the elections" and "dead as muttons throughout the rest of the year", and that it was "nothing but an election machine." Several former leaders of the party had opined that the SLP was "long since dead or on the point of dying." The Daily Mail itself declared the party to be "of no use to the Colony."

Reddi officially resigned on 21 July, opining that the party's situation was now "hopeless and intolerable" and that it had "ceased to exist as a coherent body in anything but name." He accused P. M. Williams of dominating party affairs behind-the-scenes through members of his faction on the General Council, outvoting Reddi on "every worthwhile issue" and preventing the party from achieving any meaningful progress. He claimed that, in stepping down, he was handing over "nominal control" of the SLP to "the man who [had] all this time been in actual control of it." He also blamed Mohamed Sopiee, the president of the Pan-Malayan Labour Party, as being partly responsible for the SLP's problems. The Straits Times reported that Reddi's resignation had been expected by many of the SLP's members. C. C. Tan, the head of the PP, stated that Reddi had been a "very genuine and sincere worker", opining: "So long as the decent leaders continue to desert the Labour Party, there is no earthly hope of it ever becoming anything but an instrument for furthering the designs of opportunists and adventurers."

Williams accused Reddi of having resigned over his failure to solve the party's various issues and to avoid being publicly voted out as chairman at the SLP's annual conference. He claimed that Reddi had rarely introduced any motion which the General Council could outvote to begin with, and that he had mostly voted with the council. Stevens called Reddi "one of those noisy rebels and dissidents". In response to Williams, Reddi claimed that it had been impossible to pull the party out of its crisis as Williams and his 'clique', including Stevens, were "mad after personal position and power". He then denied rumours that he would be joining the PP, instead stating that he intended to take a long break from politics. The resignation led to yet another crisis, with two more members of the General Council expected to follow Reddi, leaving the council with too few members to form a quorum as per the SLP's constitution. Stevens then clarified that the resignation "did not alter the constitutional position" of the council.

The General Council then insisted that the party was still "very much alive" as it intended to institute a "stop-gap solution" in the meantime as they searched for a successor to Reddi, hoping for either former SLP chair Francis Thomas or Davies to return to the SLP to act as chair. T. D. Richards, the vice-president of the Malay Seamen's Union, was elected his successor at the 25 June meeting of the council. However, Richards resigned with four members of the council just three months after, and the post was left vacant for three months before V. P. Abdullah, a journalist who was in Williams's faction, was finally elected the chair. At the election, only one candidate, S. S. Manyam in the North Ward, contested on the SLP ticket. Several instead stood as "independent Labour" candidates, such as S. M. Hussain in the Rochore Ward, Mak Pak Shee in the East Ward and V. Mariappan in the South Ward. Of these four, only Mak won his seat.

== Sarawak ==
In the 1950s, shortly after quitting the SLP, Reddi moved to Sarawak, where he eventually settled permanently. According to scholar Michael B. Leigh, this was because he had found himself in an "awkward position" in Singapore after representing the Naval Base Labour Union. He continued to practise law there, becoming the second to be admitted to the Roll of Advocates of Sarawak on its creation in 1953. He established the firm Reddi & Co. in Kuching in the same year. According to Chambers, the firm would eventually grow to become one of Sarawak's "pre-eminent and largest law firms." By the early 1980s, he was considered a "senior and prominent" figure of the Bar there.

=== Politics ===
On arriving in Sarawak, Reddi became acquainted with politician Ong Kee Hui and legal partners Stephen Yong Kuet Tze and T. G. Dunbar, the latter of whom, like Reddi, was formerly of Singapore and was already closely associated with the leftist scene in Singapore by the time he moved temporarily to Sarawak. The four would gather at Dunbar's office frequently to discuss current affairs and politics. In 1953, Reddi and Dunbar suggested that they form a political party to "lead the young in the right direction" away from "communist agitators". This new party, which was to be the Sarawak People's Party (SPP), would not cater to any race in particular, finding parties such as the UMNO, Malayan Chinese Association and the Malayan Indian Congress to be "divisive". Ong and Yong drew up the constitution, and Reddi and Dunbar provided the two with legal advice. The latter two believed that, as they were not from Sarawak, they should "stay in the background." They had formed the party with the intent of contesting the upcoming first district local elections in Sarawak later that year.

Temenggong Jugah Barieng, a close friend of Ong's, had initially pledged to be involved in the proposed SPP, and Yong saw success in gathering support for their plans among the local Chinese community. However, they were unsuccessful in convincing the Malayan National Union or the Sarawak Dayak Association to join the party, with the latter suggesting that they form a party catering to the local Chinese community specifically instead. Additionally, Temenggong Jugah later reneged on his pledge in 1959, telling Ong that he could only grant his "moral support" for the party, having been pressured by government officials who "had reservations" about the SPP. This marked the end of Ong's several attempts to form the SPP, though it eventually led him and Ong to form the Sarawak United Peoples' Party later that year.

== Personal life and death ==
While attending a talk by the students' union of the University of Reading, Reddi met an Englishwoman who had studied for a Bachelor of Arts (Honours) in England and in France whom he would later marry. With her, he had two children, both of whom were in England by the early 1980s. Reddi died in Sarawak in mid-1982. A reference was held in the High Court of Kuching in memory of both Reddi and Wan Alwi bin Tuanku Ibrahim on 14 July. His obituarist in the Malayan Law Journal wrote that there was "no doubt that he [had] contributed much to the legal profession in Sarawak and was held in high esteem by members of the Bar both in his own time and now."
