= V. P. Abdullah =

Singaporean journalist and politician (1913–1996)

- Abdullah, c. 1951

Personal details
- Born: Valiya Purayil Abdullah; 1913 Mattul, North Malabar, Kerala, British Raj
- Died: 15 March 1996 (aged 83) Tan Tock Seng Hospital, Singapore
- Party: Labour Front (1954); Labour Party (1951–1954); Independent (1948–1951)
- Occupation: Journalist; politician

Valiya Purayil Abdullah (1913 – 15 March 1996), better known as V. P. Abdullah, was a Singaporean journalist and politician who was, for several decades, the editor of the Kerala Bandhu and its successor, the Malaysia Malayali, both of which catered toward the local Malayali community.

He stood as a candidate for the Municipal North-East Ward in the 1948 general election as an independent and for the Bukit Timah Ward in the 1951 general election as a member of the Labour Party, positioning himself each time as an advocate for the rights of the working class, though he was unsuccessful in both.

A member of the Labour Party's General Council in the 1950s, he was elected its chair in 1953, at a time when it had suffered significantly as a result of infighting. As the head of the party, he pushed for several amendments to its constitution with the intent of remedying this and eventually oversaw its 1954 merger with the Singapore Socialist Party to form the Labour Front, though he also led the Labour Party's withdrawal from the Labour Front just months after the latter's formation.

== Early life and education ==
Abdullah was born in 1913 in the village of Mattul in North Malabar, Kerala, where he also received his education. A Malayali, he was also Muslim. He came to Singapore in 1937, joining the Malabar Muslim Jama'ath, which represented the local community of Muslim immigrants from Kerala, shortly after.

== Journalism career ==
=== Kerala Bandhu ===
The year after his arrival in Singapore, the Kerala Bandhu, a Malayalam-language weekly catering toward the Malayali community of British Malaya, was established by K. K. Abdul Rahman in Batu Pahat "more out of interest than any other reason". This venture was not profitable, suffering from low readership and poor management. On hearing of the founding of a local Malayalam periodical, Abdullah began sending Rahman news items. The latter was "attracted by [Abdullah]'s enthusiasm" and brought him over to Batu Pahat to help run the newspaper. To improve readership, Rahman moved the business to Singapore on Abdullah's suggestion, where there were more Malayalis. In its first two decades, each of the paper's limited staff took on various roles. During the Japanese Occupation of Singapore, which lasted from 1942 to 1945 as part of World War II, the Kerala Bandhu, now a daily, was known as the Swathanthra Bharatham. One of three Indian newspapers circulated locally in this period, it was distributed to the Indian military at Rangoon. The newspaper was most successful in this period, and he was made the editor-in-chief.

By 1951, he had reportedly been "attached to several vernacular papers." It was around this time that he hired K. Koya, whom he had met in 1948 and who was previously with the then recently shuttered Videsha Malayali, as sub-editor and as a translator; Abdullah claimed to have found quickly that Koya was "of a different political opinion", being pro-Communist. This was reportedly evident through Koya's translations and his selections for news items and headlines, and through Koya's brief arrest by the Special Branch the year of his hiring. He reminded the latter that Communism was banned in Singapore and told him not to "make use of his paper for his own political philosophy." Abdullah later recalled that Koya sometimes used headlines which "would have had serious consequences", thus forcing reprints and resulting in "constant conflict" between him and management. Koya first left the paper in the first half of the 1950s after a dispute with Abdullah's then managing partner, V. M. Mathews, over headlines, returning to India for several years.

On 4 March 1951, Abdullah was elected the treasurer on the interim executive council of the newly founded Singapore Union of Journalists (SUJ). He continued to serve on the union's executive council for several years into the mid-1950s. Koya returned to the Kerala Bandhu in January 1954; Mathews had asked him to as the paper was then "in difficulties." Abdullah later recalled that in 1959, when the People's Action Party (PAP) came into power, Koya's political stance became more apparent in his work once more, resulting in the two feuding and Abdullah having to look over Koya's work before it made it to print. He accused Koya of "playing up and down news items" according to his biases and described rectifying this as "mental and physical torture". This eventually culminated in the paper being banned in the Federation of Malaya in August 1960 as a result of Koya's output being pro-Communist. Abdullah then fired Koya in early November, believing this to be necessary for the business to continue and alleging that Koya refused to comply with the policies of the paper, after which he was successful in having the ban on the Kerala Bandhu lifted, though he was required to keep the Ministry of the Interior informed on any changes to the paper's editorial board and chief reporters. Around this time, Abdullah left the paper for two years for "personal reasons". Sivaraman Nair then took over as editor until his return.

=== Dispute with SUJ ===
At the time of his dismissal, Koya was a member of the executive council of the SUJ. The union then asked Abdullah to demonstrate why Koya's dismissal had been necessary; the union alleged that he only made "vague allegations of policy violations" without "being able to substantiate any of his allegations." The union held negotiations with Abdullah that were overseen by Wee Toon Boon, the Permanent Secretary for the Ministry of Labour and Law, and Abdullah withdrew his termination of Koya on 22 November. However, he again fired Koya on 10 December, accompanying this with a $536 cheque.

The SUJ felt that Abdullah had been unable to properly justify his reasoning for Koya's termination, in that he had been unclear in how Koya had violated the paper's policy, and called for the latter to be reinstated. The Minister for Labour and Law, K. M. Byrne, directed the dispute to the Industrial Arbitration Court after attempting to resolve it thrice to no avail, with Abdullah and Mathews representing the Kerala Bandhu. The SUJ was represented by secretary A. Mahadeva, president Chan Sun Choy and committee member James Foo. Abdullah finally revealed at a hearing in April that Koya had been the cause of the paper's ban, supported by evidence that was supplied to the court in camera. Mahadeva accused Abdullah of having "used the privilege of the court to brand [Koya] as pro-Communist and Communist so as to put him at a disadvantage in earning his living." The SUJ held that Koya did not violate the paper's policy as the Kerala Bandhu as a whole had been "hostile" to the PAP before it had come to power, which Abdullah denied, claiming that the paper was independent of any political or religious affiliation and that it took only a "pro-people" stance, though he struggled to clarify what the paper's policy had been.

On 24 April, the SUJ applied for all of the evidence heard in camera in the past two hearings to be "brought into open court". This was in response to Abdullah's labelling of Koya as "pro-Communist" and "Communist", which Mahadeva felt were "seriously damaging allegations" that were made in open court. However, this was denied as the evidence included items that were "of an intimate and personal nature involving the Ministry of the Interior of the Government of the Federation of Malaya." According to Charles Gamba, the president of the court, Byrne had "received a communication" from the Federation's Minister of the Interior clarifying this. The court instead "abruptly" ruled on 6 May to confirm Koya's dismissal, but also ordered Abdullah to pay Koya an additional $2,000 in compensation due to the length and nature of his service to the Kerala Bandhu.

=== Malaysia Malayali ===
The Kerala Bandhu folded due to financial troubles on 1 June 1964. The firm Asia Printers and Publishers Ltd. was then established with the intent of establishing a successor, to be called the Malaysia Malayali. The managing director of the company was dancer K.P. Bhaskar; Abdullah was a director and was also to continue as managing editor of the new paper. The firm then received the support and leadership of many noted figures of the local Malayali community. However, the reinvention did little to improve the paper's financial situation. In 1969, the firm agreed to let Abdullah "run it his own way" in an attempt to "revive" the business. Despite this, the Malaysia Malayali suffered several "break-downs"; it was kept afloat through Abdullah "[approaching] many well-wishers for monetary contributions." Readership continued to decline as English-language papers continued to grow in prominence. In 1971, 10 of the paper's employees went on strike. This lasted one day before Abdullah agreed to give the striking workers a $20 pay rise each. On 2 May 1980, he pleaded guilty to five counts of failing to contribute his share of Central Provident Fund contributions for employees. The Malaysia Malayali shuttered for good on 25 December 1988.

== Political career ==
Abdullah worked for the Azad Hind, opposing the British rule of India, during the Japanese occupation. He was an assistant at the organisation's Press and Publicity Department. As a local "Muslim leader", he participated in a series of Azad Hind broadcasts in 1944 which aimed to "further [intensify] the Indian war effort." He was later hired at the Ministry of Information, with whom he conducted an "extensive propaganda tour throughout Malaya." Abdullah was elected the chairman of the newly founded Indian Nationalist Muslim Majlis, representing the local Indian Muslim community, in May 1946. In the same month, he was elected to the committee of the newly formed Singapore branch of the Indian Relief Committee in Malaya.

Abdullah was a member of the delegation sent to represent Singapore at the first annual conference of the Malayan Indian Congress (MIC), held in Sentul, Kuala Lumpur, in June 1947. He was involved in setting up the party's Singapore branch, the Singapore Regional Indian Congress (SRIC). He was elected the treasurer and a delegate of the SRIC's Joo Chiat, Changi and Paya Lebar division in February 1947. He was also elected to the SRIC's executive committee. As a member of the MIC, he was barred by the party from contesting in elections as the MIC, working with the All-Malaya Council of Joint Action (AMCJA), planned to "work for the further intensification of opposition to the Constitution Proposals." The AMCJA had called for a boycott of the elections as only British subjects could vote, which allowed many who the AMCJA held "[did] not regard Malaya as their real home and object of their loyalty" to "interfere in the running in the country" while many Malays were unable to vote as they were "protected persons" as opposed to subjects.

=== 1948 general election ===
In January 1948, Abdullah announced that he would be standing as a candidate in the upcoming Legislative Council general election, to be held on 20 March as the first general election in Singapore. He was one of two SRIC members to announce their candidacy in the election, with the other being Malathi Pillai, the secretary of the SRIC's women's section and a social worker who was the wife of Kerala Bandhu publisher K. S. Pillai. In response, the pair were expelled from the MIC, and in turn the SRIC, though it was expected that they would still receive a significant amount of support from those of the SRIC in an unofficial capacity in their campaigns. They were among the 12 members of the MIC across the region to have been expelled for this reason.

Running as an independent, he was to contest the Municipal North-East ward, which was to have two representatives on the council. He advocated for the establishment of a government-owned 'Co-operative Bank' which would help small dealers compete against wholesalers. Positioning himself as a supporter of the working class, His platform also included a "three-fold plank" for labour, which called for the workers to be "championed" in the council, for the elimination of discrimination by race, class or religion in work and for the promotion of adult education amongst labourers, hoping to reduce the rate of adult illiteracy in the country. He pledged to improve the wages and working conditions of civil servants and police officers.

Abdullah also advocated for the improvement of living conditions and facilities in the local slums, increasing rice rations, lowering the price of rice through subsidies, protect the Income Tax Ordinance and lower indirect taxes. His manifesto also called for the government to fund primary education, to be made compulsory, for citizens entirely, as well as for the promotion of higher education through government subsidisation. He proposed that these be funded through a cap on incomes or a "super-tax on profits". He was billed as a "humble worker who [could] understand the difficulties of the labourer and the underdog for he [was] one of them, moving with them and working with them" who was "not an agent of vested interests", he proclaimed that to aim to "serve all communities irrespective of race." He felt that the existing legislature had "meagre" representation for the people at large, and that the working class "[bore] greater part of the burden of taxation and whose claims for a square deal are met either with an official frown or an unofficial scorn".

The Municipal North-East seats ended up the "most hotly-contested" in the election, with seven candidates in total running in the division. The other candidates comprised two members of the Progressive Party, John Laycock and Lim Chuan Geok, and four independents, Mohamed Javad Namazie, R. C. H. Lim, M. K. Chidambaram and Charles Joseph Pemberton Paglar. He accused his opponents of being "upper-class people" and proclaimed himself "the people's man". The Malabar Muslim Jama'ath unanimously voted to support Abdullah's candidacy, claiming that he was "the only candidate in [the Municipal North-East] who [was] a commoner." It was reported that Muslims from Kerala then formed a significant voting bloc in the country.

Laycock criticised Abdullah's plan for government-funded education for its costliness, as well as the latter's call for government subsidies on rice This prompted a response from Abdullah, who accused Laycock of having a "soft spot" for the "vested interests" who would bare the cost of the plan. On 8 March, Abdullah's campaign speeches and letters were stolen from his house. The Malayan Democratic Union (MDU) then complained on behalf of Pusat Tenaga Ra'ayat and the AMCJA to then Prime Minister of India Jawaharlal Nehru on the conduct of the seven candidates of the 1948 election who were Indian nationals, including Abdullah, Pillai, Namazie and Chidambaram, in addition to S. C. Goho, M. A. Majid and Nazir Ahmad Mallal, accusing them of "opportunism and personal aggrandisement". Abdullah and Pillai were singled out by the MDU as former SRIC members for having "[ignored Nehru's] advice" and failing to "choose between India and Malaya" by standing for election as British subjects, thereby "[co-operating] with the British government of Malaya in its scheme to perpetuate colonialism in Malaya."

In the election, Abdullah received just 944 of a total of 12,082 votes cast in the Municipal North-East. He came in sixth, ahead of only Lim Chuan Geok. Laycock and Namazie won the seats. On 24 July, Goho, who had been elected in the Rural West ward, died in office, triggering a by-election which was to be held on 16 October. Shortly after this was announced, Abdullah expressed his intention to stand in the by-election as an independent, and he was, in early August, considered the only "certain" candidate for the race, though he later clarified that he would only make a "definite announcement" on Nomination Day. He ultimately decided against contesting. On the SRIC's endorsement of Balwant Singh in the race, he criticised the party for going against the AMCJA election boycott. In October 1949, the committee of the SRIC voted to lift the Abdullah and Pillai's expulsion from the party, allowing them to rejoin. Abdullah eventually chose to rejoin the organisation.

=== 1951 general election ===
On 3 March 1951, Abdullah announced that he would be standing as a candidate in the upcoming Legislative Council general election, to be held on 10 April, as a member of the Labour Party, formed in 1948 to advocate for workers' rights by unionists, including Majid, who was its founding chair, as well as P. M. Williams and M. P. D. Nair. He was to contest in the Bukit Timah ward. The Singapore Standard then reported that Abdullah was then reputed as an "ardent" public worker who "[held] broad socialist views and [was] a great supporter of working class movements." He described his views as "broad and progressive", though he claimed to have "never entertained narrow communism."

Abdullah again pledged to push for free and compulsory education up to standard five, in addition to advocating for the institution of a system in which children in rural areas could be taught both English and their mother tongue. He also called for the establishment of a co-operative system to improve the living conditions of fishermen. Other planks of his platform included supporting Malayan independence, tackling the black market for essential commodities, ensuring that Rural Board and Village Committee members were decided by election, improving facilities in rural areas and instituting social insurance and security for labourers. He again positioned himself as an advocate for workers' rights and the "common man". At an election rally of his, speeches were delivered in six languages, including Malayalam.

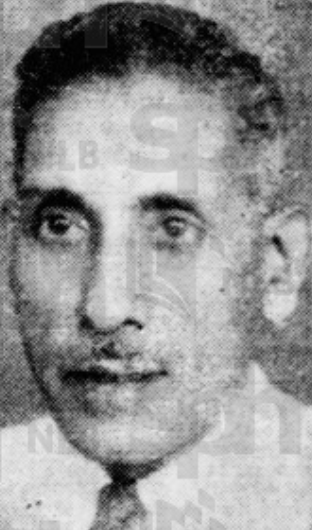
Merchant and Singapore Rural Board member H. J. C. Kulasingha, Abdullah's only opponent in Bukit Timah.

Abdullah's only opponent in Bukit Timah was H. J. C. Kulasingha of the Progressive Party. Majid, who had by then broken with the Labour Party, announced on 6 March that he was considering standing against Abdullah in the election as an independent, though he ultimately contested in the City ward instead. Abdullah criticised the living conditions in Pasir Panjang, which were within the ward, noting that 100 families were serviced by a single well, and pledged to advocate for the improvements of facilities of villages in the area. He claimed that Kulasingha, being a member of the Singapore Rural Board and thus a "Government Man", would "never be able to fight freely for the welfare of the people". He further noted that the poor living conditions were in spite of the existence of various Rural District Committees in the area such as the Pasir Panjang Rural District Committee, of which Kulasingha was chairman, opining that the committees, which had been established years ago, had "not a thing to boast of".

In response to Abdullah's claims regarding the Rural District Committees, Goh Tong Liang, the honorary secretary of the Bukit Panjang Rural District Committee who would go on to be a politician with the Progressive Party, opined that Abdullah had "little inside knowledge" on the work of the committees, and that the committee had faced "obstacles and hindrances" in their attempts to address the issues Abdullah mentioned. Goh claimed that Abdullah would "simply be continuing" the work of the committees if he were to be elected. Additionally, Goh criticised Abdullah's speeches in Bukit Panjang, noting that he had visited the district only two or three times and made no mention of those involved in agriculture, instead focusing entirely on labourers, despite the district being "essentially agricultural". Instead, he supported Kulasingha, who he felt was "qualified to know the needs and requirements of the rural people", and that the latter was unlike Abdullah in that he was "a man domiciled in the rural area." On 2 April, Abdullah accused Kulasingha of "using his influence" as a Rural Board member to gain votes. He also accused the latter of using this influence to "cause" the removal of his election posters from some buses.

In the election, Abdullah received 983 votes, 428 less than what Kulasingha received. Later in the month, the former announced that he had discovered "irregularities" in one polling booth, which he alleged was a "private house", and that if he could gather enough evidence to support this, he would call for Kulasingha's victory to be declared "null and void" and in turn a re-election to be held in the district. He claimed that this polling station had been moved to this house from its original location at the Kay Wah School in Lim Chu Kang a mile away without informing voters or his polling agents. Additionally, he claimed that voters were "treated to refreshments by the landlord and that children were at play inside the house." He also alleged that government officers canvassed for Kulasingha. In response, Supervisor of Elections George G. Thomson noted that he had "no report of any improper canvassing", nor of any voter being "inconvenienced" by the move.

=== Labour Party ===
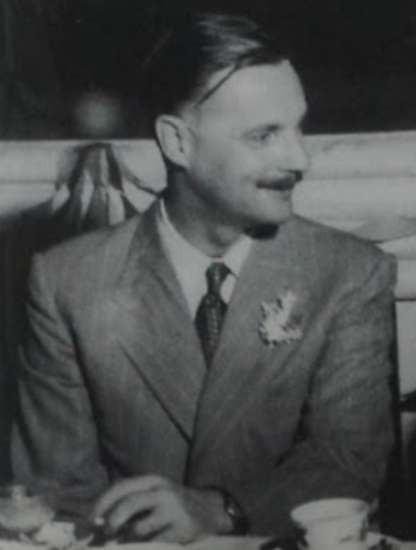
P. M. Williams (left) and Francis Thomas led the more radical and moderate factions of the Singapore Labour Party, respectively.

By mid-1951, Abdullah had become a member of the General Council of the Singapore Labour Party (SLP). He was reportedly a leader of the council's "left-wing", alongside members such as Williams, who served as the SLP's general-secretary, and E. S. Moorthy. This faction of the party, considered more radical and comprising "white-collar office workers", was spearheaded in particular by Williams. They stood in opposition to a more moderate faction, the party's "right-wing", comprising mostly Chinese "professionals and businessmen", led in particular by Francis Thomas, who was also a founding member of the SLP, and Lim Yew Hock.

Abdullah proposed an amendment to the party's constitution at the council's meeting of the SLP on 14 May that would bar members from simultaneously holding office in the party and serving on the Legislative Council or the Municipal Commission. The proposal was then put forth at the party's annual conference in June. It was expected that it would face significant opposition from the party's General Council. He also felt that a branch of the party should be established in each of the country's electoral wards, which he felt was necessary for the party to "perform its proper functions as the champion of the underdog". His other proposals included establishing a parliamentary board and an elections sub-committee, limiting the General Council's membership and in turn, its quorum requirement, having the council be more active in advising the party's members on the Legislative Council or Municipal Commission and requiring those members to contribute 10% of their allowance to the party's election campaign fund.

At a meeting of the SLP General Council in October, Abdullah, Williams and Moorthy and the rest of the council's left-wing "clashed" with members of the council's "right-wing" such as Thomas and Nair over the proposed "Cabinet system" for the government of Singapore. The left-wing held this to be an attempt to "buy off unofficial members of the Council for the purpose of perpetuating colonial rule in Singapore." This resulted in the party's official position on the matter being that it "[doubted] the value" of instituting such a system and that it would "consider the proposals in detail". In February 1952, he denounced the UMNO–MCA alliance as "capitalistic and feudalistic". He came together with two other members of the party, Legislative Councillor C. R. Dasaratha Raj and A. D. Edward, to condemn Nair's call to support the alliance, suggesting that Nair should have instead called on voters to support the Selangor Labour Party or the Independence of Malaya Party. He was re-elected to the General Council the month after, receiving the third highest number of votes behind Williams and Thomas. In May, he was elected to the general committee of the SRIC.

At the party's annual conference in March, the left and right wings clashed on the party's stance toward the global arms race, with Abdullah sponsoring a resolution on behalf of the former calling for the party to "[view it] with alarm" and the latter holding that democracies "must speed rather than slow down rearmament to meet the Communist challenge." In April, he was placed on a three-man committee, alongside Williams and Thomas, which was to oversee the establishment of branches of the SLP in each of the electoral wards. The committee was put in charge of organising the publishing of newspapers in English, Chinese, Malay and Indian languages as the party's official organs in June. Later in the year, the moderate and radical factions of the party clashed over Williams's nomination as the SLP's candidate for the South Ward in the City Council election in December, ending with the expulsion of Lim Yew Hock, then the party president. In December, 800 members of the SLP convened at a meeting called by Thomas, which passed a vote of confidence in Lim Yew Hock and called for Williams's ousting over the latter's increasing "domination of party affairs." This dispute caused a "devastating" split, and the "continued internal strife arising from a weakened and ineffective leadership spelt the inevitable demise of the SLP." Thomas left the party some time after this.

Abdullah proposed a resolution at the party's general meeting on 6 September 1953 that the SLP "keep away from elections until complete solidarity [was] achieved among its rank and file." This resolution would not restrict any members from contesting in the upcoming City Council election later in the year. By then, the party had reportedly "lost its presitge and strength" due to infighting and he hoped to resolve the issue through the resolution, claiming to have received the support of "a vast majority of the Party" on the matter. A section of the party viewed the resolution as "defeatist"; members of this group included Raj, now the head of the committee in charge of the annual conference, who felt that such a move would only "help to disintegrate the party." However, there was broader support by now for Abdullah's proposed resolution banning the party's office-holders from running for seats on the Legislative and City Councils. It was then believed that attempts by members of the council to "get elected into positions of power and responsibility" had caused the party's decline.

On 23 October, Abdullah attended a meeting of the council where those present voted to tell Raj, then the SLP's only member on the Legislative Council, to resign his seat in protest of the government's decision to exclude members of the SLP from the Rendel Commission and its review of the Constitution of Singapore. Raj then opined that the Labour Party should be wound up as he felt that it was "non-existent." Abdullah then proposed a resolution in response to suspend Raj from the party for three months if he did not cease all his "political activities in the Colony", claiming that he was "confused" and had been a "bundle of contradictions".

Abdullah was elected the chair of the SLP on 26 December; the post had been vacant since the resignation of his predecessor T. D. Richards, who had left with four other members of the General Council in September. Alongside Moorthy, who was at this point the SLP's secretary, he pledged to make a "sincere and determined effort" to "revitalise the party in the interests of the working class". The SLP was then in a "parlous condition." According to researcher Saul Rose, nearly every "member of repute" had already resigned or been expelled by then.

On taking office, he worked toward barring office-holders in the party from running in the general or local elections and establishing branches in each of the nine wards. The branches were to elect one delegate to the party's annual conference for every 50 members; this was to ensure that the conference would be "conducted strictly on constitutional lines" and to help "eliminate personality complexes which once seemed to strangle the party." This was an attempt to "make something of the wreck they had taken over." The annual conference led to several amendments to the party's constitution. After the event, Abdullah invited all former members of the party to rejoin.

=== Labour Front ===
On 1 May 1954, the Singapore Socialist Party (SSP), a rival to the SLP, was officially founded by former members of the latter who had resigned or been expelled, including Thomas, Lim Yew Hock, Nair and S. Jaganathan. Abdullah accused the SSP of being "neither Socialists nor democrats" and attempting to capitalise on the "goodwill" of the working class towards the local labour movement. He felt that the new party had "failed to explain to the public the reasons for forming such a party when the Colony has a fully grown socialist party." Two months after this, he announced that the party would vote on whether it should merge with the Labour Party of Malaya at its annual conference in September. It was then expected that the General Council would be against this, feeling that this would lead to the SLP becoming a "mere division" of the larger party.

C. H. Koh and Victor J. Mendis, initially the Singapore Labour Party's representatives on the governing committee of the Labour Front, in 1954.

In July, the SSP announced that it sought to form a "United Front" against the Progressive Party in the upcoming Legislative Assembly elections by allying with "all leftist political bodies and individuals in Singapore", including in particular the SLP. An alliance was preferred to a merger, though an "ultimate merger" was not out of the question. Despite Abdullah's previous comments, the SLP announced that it would be merging with the SSP to form the Labour Front (LF) on 21 August. Three delegates from each party were placed on a committee with "over-all powers", this comprised Abdullah, C. H. Koh and Victor J. Mendis of the SLP and Thomas, Jaganathan and Lim Yew Hock of the SSP. It was decided that both the SLP and SSP would cease their independent activities and be "fused" completely by 1 July of the following year and all six members of the committee pledged not to stand as candidates in 1955 to ensure "absolute impartiality" in this process. It was then decided that a three-man committee would govern the newly formed party; Mendis, Koh and Thomas were elected the party's leaders.

However, the candidates nominated by the LF for the 1955 Singaporean general election drew criticism from the SLP, which considered the list of candidates "injudicious" as it included several who had been members of neither the SLP nor the SSP. The situation worsened when an executive of the LF drew up a constitution and applied to officially register the LF as a political party, with the SLP wing now alleging that the LF had been established only as an "ad-hoc committee" to ensure that the SLP and SSP did not "step on each other's toes" in the upcoming election, and that the LF had now "overstepped its mandate" by registering the LF, thus implying the "dissolution" of both the SLP and the SSP. This culminated in the General Council of the SLP voting in early November to withdraw from the LF at a meeting called by Abdullah, demanding that Koh and Mendis resign their seats on the LF's governing committee. The council then accused the LF's executive committee of having hidden "their real interests." Koh and Mendis were expected to dispute this decision. The withdrawal was an early "set-back" for the LF, which had "so far been quite promising."

Mendis refused to withdraw from the LF, and the SLP quickly moved to expel him just days after the vote, though he in turn claimed to have quit the SLP, alleging that the SLP's withdrawal had the "effect of not only prejudicing but seriously hampering the cause of the masses for whom we work." Koh was expelled from the SLP in early January. Abdullah then alleged that the LF had been "turned into a deadly weapon to hoodwink the people of Singapore and kill the Labour Party." Later in the month, S. S. Manyam was elected the president of the SLP, succeeding Abdullah. The party was by then in its death throes; only one candidate, secretary-general Lee Yong Min, was fielded for the Legislative Assembly general election in April, and with his loss to an LF candidate, Mak Pak Shee, the party lost all of its representation on the Legislative Assembly of Singapore. No one was elected to succeed Manyam on his death in June, and the party did not contest in any further elections.

== Personal life and death ==
Abdullah was married; his wife was involved with the Kamala Club, a pioneering local women's organisation. He was friends with poet N. C. Nair; the two would often attend literary talks alongside poet and fellow Kerala Bandhu journalist M. K. Bhasi, union leader Michael Fernandez and trade unionist and lawyer Dominic Puthucheary. In March 1941, he was elected to the committee of the Indian Youth League of Singapore. In June 1953, Abdullah was elected the vice-president of the committee of the Netaji Memorial Library. He was elected the president of the Singapore Malayalam Sahitya Samithi, a literary association for the local Malayali community, on its founding in November 1955. He was the cultural secretary of the Singapore Kerala Samajam and a patron of the Singapore Malayalee Young Men's Association. In February 1960, Abdullah became a member of the newly formed National Theatre Fund Committee.

Abdullah died at the Tan Tock Seng Hospital on 15 March 1996.
