= Karim Dzafir =

Singaporean politician and unionist (died 1960)

- Abdul Karim bin Haji Dzafir
- Born: 1914 or 1915; Singapore, Straits Settlements, British Empire
- Died: October 22, 1960 (aged 45–46)
- Occupations: Union leader, politician
- Years active: 1947–1960
- Organization(s): Angkatan Pemuda Insaf (1947–1948); Parti Kebangsaan Melayu Malaya (1948); Malay Seamen's Union (1953–1954)
- Political party: Labour Party (1953); UMNO (1959)
- Spouse: Tili binte Awang
- Children: Six

Abdul Karim bin Haji Dzafir (1914 or 1915 – 22 October 1960), better known as Karim Dzafir, was a Singaporean union leader and politician who served as the general secretary of the Malay Seamen's Union, the chief of the short-lived Singapore branch of the Angkatan Pemuda Insaf, chair of the Singapore branch of the Malay Nationalist Union, which also shut down soon after, and the treasurer of the Labour Party. He was described as a "virile" proponent of Malay nationalism.

== Early political involvement ==
By June 1947, Karim was the chief of the Singapore branch of the Angkatan Pemuda Insaf (API). The API was a political organisation that had originated as the youth wing of the left-wing Parti Kebangsaan Melayu Malaya (PKMM) and had struck out on its own the year prior. Earlier in 1947, around 380 Malays in Singapore formed local branches of the API and the Angkatan Wanita Sedar, both headquartered on Bussorah Street and affiliated with the Pusat Tenaga Ra'ayat. Karim stated that the API's main aims were the same as the PKMM and that they pushed for a fully independent Malaya and reinstating the sovereignty of the Sultans, in addition to opposing the Federation of Malaya proposals.

However, on 16 July, the Governor of the Malayan Union, Edward Gent, declared the API an "unlawful society", justifying this by claiming that the organisation was being or was likely to be used for a purpose "incompatible with the peace, good order or welfare of the Union." This came two months after the API had been revitalised after a month of "[laying] low" following the conviction of its leader, Ahmad Boestamam, of sedition. The Registrar of Societies, E. C. S. Adkins, clarified the day after that the Singapore branch of the API had been excluded from the ban. Karim stated that the government should have worked to "[set] up really efficient machinery" to "wipe out secret societies, gangsterism, corruption and the black-market" instead of banning the API, and stated that the Singapore branch would not be shut down as it had not done anything "detrimental to the Government."

Following the ban, Boestmann and API General Secretary Ibrahim Kassim informed all branches of the outlawing and ordered them to cease activities. Just days after, the government declared that the Singapore branch would be recognised officially as a 'society' as opposed to a 'political society' as it had previously been. As such, it lost its exemption from the Societies Ordinance and was now required to register if it wished to continue on. This marked the end of the API's Singapore branch.

Karim then went on to be involved with the local branch of the PKMM. When the branch's chair, Mohamed Taha Kalu, was elected the PKMM's vice-president at its Third Annual Congress, Karim was chosen to succeed him. In the role, he was described as being a "virile nationalist Malay." With the PKMM, he argued in favour of the creation of an anti-Capitalist society. In March 1948, he spoke at an anti-election meeting alongside MNP secretary Abdullah Zawawi and Gerald de Cruz of the Malayan Democratic Union. He then announced that the MNP would organise a mass meeting in Geylang Serai in protest of the proposal to hold the Malayan Trade and Industries Exhibition on the Malay Farm on Changi Road, displacing Malay farmers in the process. However, the PKMM was disbanded later that year with the onset of the Malayan Emergency.

== Malay Seamen's Union ==
By mid-1953, Karim had been elected the secretary of the Malay Seamen's Union (MSU). At the time, the union did not represent marine officers, as they had split from the MSU in 1951 to form the Malay Marine Officers' Union. In August 1953, however, the unions agreed to reunite to form the Malay Mariners' Union. Karim was elected the General Secretary, under Osman bin Abdul Rahman as President and alongside T. D. Richards as General Adviser and Negotiator. Together, the unions reported about 2,500 members. However, the Registrar of Trade Unions refused to recognise the merger on the grounds that they had lost the "amalgamation" ballot papers. Karim then claimed that the merger was supported by nearly all of the MSU and that it had been refused "purely on technical grounds."

In mid-July 1954, a Bill was put before the Legislative Council calling for the establishment of a lodge for the seamen, managed by an authority comprising those who were "familiar with the circumstances of seafarers." This was intended to help address the lack of accommodation for Asian seamen, which led to them being "packed like sheep", in turn contributing significantly to the tuberculosis problem amongst local seamen. Karim opposed the Bill, opining that this would ultimately be ineffective, and instead suggested that the government erect and manage an Asian Seamen's Hostel, similar to Connell House. The Seamen's Welfare Officer, T. A. Simon, agreed to this and recommended the erection of such a hostel to the government in 1954. At a press conference, Simon and Master Attendant T. B. Low credited Karim with aiding seamen suffering from tuberculosis and stated that the Malay seamen had "good leaders and unity."

Mariner and union leader T. D. Richards.

In April 1955, Karim criticised statements made by Richards, in particular the proclaimation that "nobody but a mariner can represent Asian seamen", which he felt implied that the latter was stating that he "had a mandate to look after their welfare politically and industrially." In response, Richards pointed out that Karim was himself a "landsman" and claimed that, despite the MSU's reported membership of 2,000, it only had 200 paying members. Karim released a statement in early July accusing the rival Malaysian Mariners' Union (MMU) of being a "splinter union organised with no intention other than the personal glorification of the sponsors." He claimed that there were several who were "trying to get publicity" by claiming to fight for the Malay seamen. The MSU then reportedly had about 3,000 members. The statement also made indirect references to the Malaysian Ship Officers' Union (MSOU). Mohamed Said Alias of the latter union responded by opining that Dzafir's statement was "absurd" and noting that the union was "trying to better the conditions" for all Asian seamen, and thus they were "entitled to represent Malay seamen too."

The MSU joined the Singapore Seamen's Council of Action on its formation in March 1956. Karim was elected to its committee under S. Jaganathan as president. The same month, he became a member of the delegation of union leaders who met with the Chief Minister of Singapore, David Marshall, to discuss the delegation he was to lead to the United Kingdom as part of the Merdeka talks. On 29 July, it was announced that the MSU, MMU and MSOU had agreed to come under one federation which aimed to expand the local coastal trade limit, push for hiring Asians as pilots and alter the qualifications for helmsmen. Karim claimed that there would be 4,000 workers under this federation. Karim was appointed a member of the MSU's three-member delegation, led by Mohamed Isa Zin, to the inaugural meeting of an alliance of various local non-political communal organisations, held in January 1957. However, the delegation walked out after demanding a "Melayu nation" and stating that they "could not accept the principle of Malays forming merely one of the communities of Singapore." They were followed by the leader of a local Malay literary association.

In March, the Council of Action proposed merging all of its constituent unions into one. The MSU, along with the Singapore Chinese Seafarers' Association and the Pakistani Seamen's Union, withdrew in response, and another refused to join, leaving the council with just eight unions. The three unions initially demanded that the council be reorganised and a new chairman be elected, in addition to "immediate" negotiations with employers over salaries. However, they rescinded the first two and agreed to support a merger before the last was pursued, and were then readmitted into the council. The unions amalgamated into the Singapore United Seamen's Union (SUSU) and Karim became its secretary, though the MSU continued to exist and he remained its secretary as well. The SUSU then called on the government to recognise it as the only legitimate union representing local seamen.

In June 1959, Karim wrote to the Minister for Finance, Goh Keng Swee, protesting the system by which the recently instituted Seamen's Registry Board selected seamen for jobs, claiming that it had increased wait times for these workers from three months and under to up to a year. He called for the chairman and secretary of the board to be replaced, citing their lack of experience in the field. The year after, he issued a strike threat to waterboat operator Hammer and Company, demanding that it give 76 employees a three months' bonus. The threat was rescinded in April after the MSU reached a settlement with the firm. However, in the same month, the government notified the SUSU that it intended to cancel its certificate of registration. It was officially deregistered by early July, along with three other seamen's unions, with the government claiming that they were "likely to be used against the interests of seamen or of workers in the ocean and coastal transport industry."

S. R. Nathan, who was appointed the Asian Seamen's Welfare Officer in 1956 and served as a mediator with the various unions in the field, recalled that the various unions representing seamen were "largely ineffective" and "in the red" despite boasting "fantastic" membership numbers. However, he noted Karim as a "shining exception in this dismal scene", describing him as having a "sense of mission" and being "genuinely motivated" to help the Malay seamen. He stated that the MSU had "at least" a "semblance of a normal trade union", with its offices then located on Jalan Sultan, where several former PKMM members were located.

=== 1954 strike ===
M. A. Majid, leader of various unions, including the Indo-Malay-Pakistani Seamen's Union and the Asian Maritime Officers' Union.

In March 1954, the Indo-Malay-Pakistani Seamen's Union (IMPSU), headed by union leader and SLP founder M. A. Majid, called a strike for Malay seamen against the Straits Steamship Company. The firm refused to recognise the IMPSU, claiming that most of the Malay seamen it employed were with the MSU, and that it had already negotiated and settled with the latter union. The managing director of the Straits Steamship Company, W. H. McNeill, revealed later in the month that about 200 strikers had already been replaced by members of the MSU. Strikers then began picketing the MSU's offices on Jalan Sultan in addition to the company's headquarters, alleging that the MSU had aided in their replacement. When Legislative Councillor Lim Yew Hock questioned the acting Colonial Secretary W. C. Taylor on the legality of the MSU's actions, Taylor confirmed that Karim had not done anything illegal in bringing workers to the Seamen's Registration Bureau "with a view to employment as seamen", and the bureau could not turn them down.

Ten days into the strike, about 100 Malay seamen claiming to be members of the MSU gathered at its officers. They alleged that Karim, as the "self-appointed" general secretary, had supplied "non-seamen" to the Straits Steamship Company to break the strike, and voted to expel him. They then expressed their support for Majid and the IMPSU and passed a resolution ordering Karim to hand the union's records over to him. Karim then told The Singapore Standard that "no such meeting had even been conveyed nor contemplated." At the end of the month, he released a statement claiming that the MSU members participating in the strike were a minority who were being "used by professional political agitators," and urged them to reconsider as they risked expulsion from the MSU in addition to the loss of their jobs. He then condemned the IMPSU for calling the strike "without foreseeing the sad results."

Karim announced that the MSU's executive committee would consider expelling 150 seamen who had participated in the IMPSU's strike as the MSU had "no dispute" with the Straits Steamship Company, and that the meeting convened to expel him did not follow the union's rules as they had not given him 14-day's notice. As such, the meeting was illegal. Another meeting with all of the MSU's members was to be called soon to deliberate the matter. Majid then gave the Straits Steamship Company a 14-day strike notice for another union of his, the Asian Maritime Officers' Union, representing nearly 200 Malay gunners and engine drivers, over the dismissal of two Malay seamen. Karim again pledged to help the Straits Steamship Company replace striking workers. When the notice expired, all but two of the union's workers refused to go on strike, and the MSU convened an emergency general meeting to order all striking members to return to work.

On 5 July, Majid met with the Commissioner for Labour, C. W. Lyle, who rejected his demand for an investigation and enquiry committee on the strike. A week after, he met with Simon, who called the strike a "complete flop" and told Majid that he would "not move an inch" until the strike was called off. This led Majid to finally end the strike.

== Later political career ==
=== Labour Party ===
Karim attended the 1953 annual conference of the Labour Party, held in September, which had by then suffered severely from infighting and lost many of its members. Richards had been appointed its chairman in July, succeeding S. K. Reddi. At the conference, several members introduced various amendments. C. R. Dasaratha Raj, then the sole SLP member on the Legislative Council, introduced a motion calling for the governing General Council, which had been accused of being dominated by a faction led by P. M. Williams, to be reduced from 21 members to 12, as well as for the conference to be held each year. Karim was elected its treasurer and thus became a member of the General Council, alongside Richards and Said Alias. This was reportedly the first time half of the members elected to the General Council were union leaders.

In October, several members of the General Council convened a meeting to deliberate calling on Raj to resign from the Legislative Council. This was in protest of his non-inclusion from the Rendel Commission. Disapproving of the meeting, Richards resigned with fellow General Council members Karim, Said Alias and George Joshua. The meeting itself was attended by just six members of the Council and two ex-officio members, which was just enough to form a quorum, and the council voted to call on Raj to resign. The SLP secretary, E. S. Moorthy, then claimed that he had only received resignation letters from Richards and Karim.

=== UMNO ===
By the end of the decade, Karim had joined the Singapore branch of UMNO. By April 1959, he was appointed the President of the party's Kallang Division. The Straits Times then reported that it was believed that the state committee of UMNO had nominated him to contest the Geylang East Constituency in the upcoming general election. However, he did not ultimately stand for election and UMNO did not field a candidate in that constituency. He attended the party's Singapore conference in June 1960.

== Personal life and death ==
Karim was born in the mid-1910s. He married Tili binte Awang, with whom he had six children. The family lived on Lorong 28 Geylang. Upon the closure of the SUSU, Karim became "sick and depressed", fearing that he would lose his job. In early October, he was put under "medical attention". On the morning of 22 October 1960, his wife attempted to enter the room where their youngest child, a six-year-old boy, was asleep. Finding it locked, she called for him to open the door; he was found hanging from the ceiling with a rope around his neck after the child woke up and opened the door. On 27 January 1961, the coroner ruled that Karim had died by suicide.
