= 1952 Singapore City Council election =

- 6 December 1952

6 of the 18 elected seats to the Singapore City Council
- Turnout: 51.02%
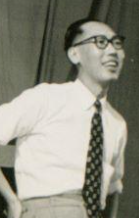

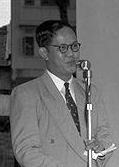
	First party	Second party
Leader	Tan Chye Cheng	Lim Yew Hock
Party	Progressive	Labour
Leader's seat	Did not contest	Did not contest
Seats before	8	5
Seats won	4	1
Seats after	9	4
Seat change	▲1	▼1
Popular vote	9,637	5,647
Percentage	42.88%	25.12%

The 1952 Singapore City Council election was the 2nd election to the Singapore City Council. It was held on 6 December 1952 to elect 6 of the 18 seats in the City Council.

== Results ==
Party	Votes	%	Seats				
Party	Votes	%	Total before	Won	Not up	Total after	+/–
Progressive Party	9,637	42.88	8	4	5	9	+1
Labour Party	5,647	25.12	5	1	3	4	–1
Independents	7,192	32.00	5	1	4	5	0
Total	22,476	100.00	18	6	12	18	0
Valid votes	22,476	98.13					
Invalid/blank votes	429	1.87					
Total votes	22,905	100.00					
Registered voters/turnout	44,896	51.02					
Source: Singapore Elections

=== By constituency ===
Constituency	Electorate	Party	Candidate	Votes	%
City	6,279	Progressive Party	M. Oli Mohamed Mohamed Kassim	2,164	42.8
City	6,279	Independent	Syed Mumtaz Hussain	866	35.6
City	6,279	Independent	Cuthbert Francis Joseph Ess	526	21.6
East	8,707	Progressive Party	Amy Ede	1,801	38.0
East	8,707	Independent	Mak Pak Shee	1,520	32.1
East	8,707	Labour Party	Lee Yong Min	854	18.0
East	8,707	Independent	Valath Sankunny Padmanabhan	306	6.5
East	8,707	Independent	Narendra Gerald Nugawela	260	5.5
North	8,929	Labour Party	Anthony Rebeiro Lazarous	2,560	58.2
North	8,929	Progressive Party	Lim Choo Sye	1,817	41.3
North	8,929	Independent	Abdul L. Shukoor	23	0.5
Rochore	8,229	Progressive Party	Sim Beng Seng	1,936	50.4
Rochore	8,229	Labour Party	D. Stevens	1,388	36.1
Rochore	8,229	Independent	Syed Mohamed Abdul Hameed Chisty	520	13.5
South	8,693	Independent	Jaganathan Saminathan	2,093	43.2
South	8,693	Progressive Party	Manickvasagar Subramaniam	1,903	39.3
South	8,693	Labour Party	Peter Massillamany Williams	845	17.5
West	4,059	Progressive Party	Phyllis Eu Cheng Li	1,139	51.4
West	4,059	Independent	Stella Manyam	904	40.8
West	4,059	Independent	J. George V. Parambil	174	7.8
Source: Singapore Elections
