= Mak Pak Shee =

Singaporean politician

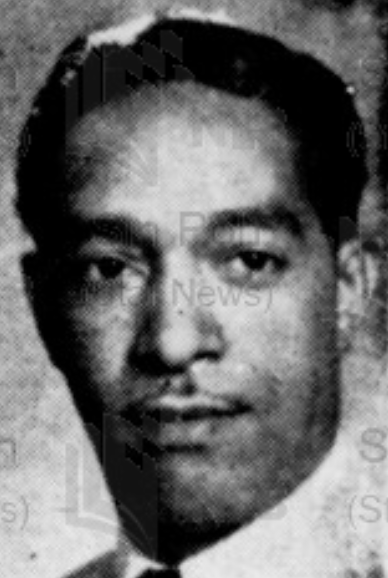
Mak in 1953

Mak Pak Shee (Chinese: 麦柏士; pinyin: Mài Bǎishì) was a Singaporean politician.

== Career ==
An African Chinese with Cantonese ancestry, Mak was the leader of the Singapore-based Labour Party. He left the party in August 1950. When he was in the Cabinet, he held the position of Junior Minister. In his book One Man's View of the World (2013), Singapore's first Prime Minister Lee Kuan Yew described Mak as a "fixer – somebody who facilitated the fulfilment of favours for a fee".

== Lawsuits ==
In July 1948, Mak was meted a fine of S$250 for inappropriately including the honorifics "MB, BS" in his name.

== Personal life ==
Mak had eight sons. His third son, Mak Kok Hoe, died aged eight in February 1957 and was buried at Bidadari Cemetery.
