= Francis Thomas (politician) =

Singaporean politician (1912–1977)

Francis Thomas BBM
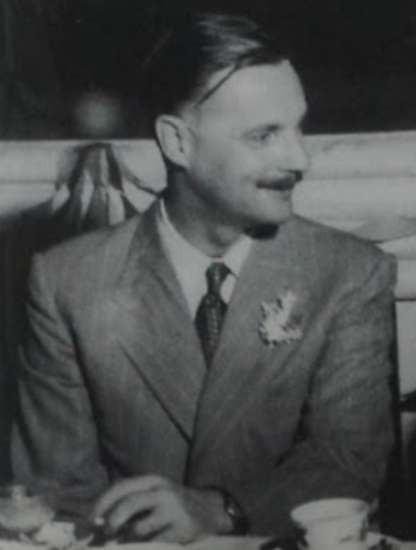
- Thomas in 1948

Minister for Communications and Works
- In office 7 April 1955 – 1 February 1959
- Chief Minister: David Marshall; Lim Yew Hock
- Preceded by: Position established
- Succeeded by: M. P. D. Nair (SPA)

Nominated member of the Legislative Assembly
- In office 22 April 1955 – 31 April 1959; Serving with R. C. H. Lim
- Governor: John Nicoll

Personal details
- Born: 10 April 1912 Westcote, Gloucestershire, England, United Kingdom
- Died: 12 October 1977 (aged 65) Singapore
- Citizenship: United Kingdom (until 1957); Singapore (from 1957)
- Party: Labour Front (1954–1960); Singapore Socialist Party (1954); Labour Party (1948–1952)
- Spouse: Catherine Eng Neo Thomas (m. 1948)
- Children: 3
- Occupation: Politician; educator

Francis Thomas (10 April 1912 – 12 October 1977) was an English-born Singaporean politician and educator who served as the first minister for communications and works from 1955 to 1959. A member of the Labour Front (LF), he served as a nominated member of the Legislative Assembly from 1955 to 1959.

Born in Westcote, Thomas was educated at Highgate School and the University of Cambridge, before travelling to Singapore to work at St Andrew's School in 1934. During the Second World War, he was a part of the Singapore Volunteer Corps. Following the fall of Singapore, he was made a prisoner-of-war and was held at Changi Prison. In 1944, while being sent to Japan on the captured SS President Harrison, he survived after it was torpedoed and sank; Thomas later witnessed the bombing of Nagasaki. After the Japanese surrender, he went to Southampton before returning to teach at St Andrew's in Singapore in 1947.

In 1948, he became politically involved with the Labour Party (SLP), serving as one of its vice-presidents and later its president from 1949 to 1950. However, the SLP began facing internal issues amongst its members from 1951 to 1952, culminating in Thomas leaving the party alongside Lim Yew Hock. Two years later, Thomas was involved in creating the Singapore Socialist Party (SSP) – alongside others like Lim and David Marshall – which merged with the SLP to form the Labour Front (LF). The LF contested at the 1955 general election and won the most seats, with Marshall serving as the first chief minister.

Thomas was nominated by governor John Nicoll to the Legislative Assembly, and he served as the minister for communications and works from 1955 to 1959, where he worked on flood prevention schemes and nationalising public transport. In February 1959, he resigned as minister after being asked to by chief minister Lim and was succeeded by M. P. D. Nair. By 1959, many original members of the LF had left; Thomas announced the unanimous decision to dissolve the LF in 1960. He retired from politics thereafter and returned to education, serving as the principal of St Andrew's from 1963 to 1974. He retired in 1975 and died on 12 October 1977 from cancer.

== Early life and military service ==
Francis Thomas was born on 10 April 1912 in Westcote, Gloucestershire, to P. M. and The Reverend J. A. Thomas. His parents were Christians, and J. A. worked at a church as a rector. Thomas was the fourth of six children and grew up during the First World War. He was of Welsh descent through his father. He attended church in his youth but later described the services as "quite meaningless to me". He boarded at Highgate School in London. Thomas then studied English at the University of Cambridge and, in 1934, was appointed as an assistant master of St Andrew's School, succeeding The Reverend Joseph Lee. He travelled to Singapore via the Ranpura.

In 1937, Thomas took over as director of Basic English studies in Singapore from Margaret Saumarez Smith, (Note: Smith is referred to as "Mrs. Bottrall" in the source. She married Raffles College professor of English literature F. J. R. Bottrall in 1934.) after she went on leave. During the Second World War, he stopped working at Saint Andrew's to serve in the war. He was a part of the Singapore Volunteer Corps's Bomb Disposal Unit and was stationed at Balestier Plain prior to the fall of Singapore. During the Japanese occupation, Thomas was interned as a prisoner-of-war at Changi Prison. After six months, he was sent to Thailand, where he suffered from malaria.

Thomas was stationed at a hill which became known as the Kamu Death Camp, due to the large number of deaths from diseases. In 1944, he was selected for a group that was sent to Japan, first arriving in Singapore before travelling to Japan on the captured American ship SS President Harrison. During their voyage, Harrison was torpedoed by submarines off the coast of Vietnam and sank. He escaped onto a lifeboat before jumping off and joining a different lifeboat which had British officers. A Japanese officer was on board with them, who Thomas later credited for saving them as he believed that the Japanese boats would not have rescued them if not for the officer.

Thomas was taken to a hospital ship that had about 600 survivors. He arrived in Japan shortly after and was taken to a quarantine island. Within his group, he was made a corporal. He worked eight-hour-long days and later fell sick; while at a camp hospital, he witnessed the bombing of Nagasaki. Following the Japanese surrender, he took a hospital ship to Southampton, Hampshire, arriving in December 1946. Thomas stayed with his family for a year before returning to Singapore in January 1947, where he resumed teaching at St Andrew's. He joined the Singapore Teachers' Union that same year.

== Political career ==
=== Labour Party ===
In 1948, Thomas read in The Straits Times that M. A. Majid was calling a meeting because he planned to form a new political party: the Labour Party (SLP). Out of curiosity, he decided to attend, expecting to be refused due to being an expatriate. However, he ended up being elected to its provisional committee, with Majid serving as its chairman. Thomas later became one of two vice-presidents – alongside S. Sankaran – under Majid as president in November. The following month, he was appointed the chairman of a subcommittee that looked into participating at the upcoming Municipal Commission election in April 1949. The SLP later announced in January that they planned to contest around one-third of the seats at the elections. During their election campaign, Thomas spoke about their party's manifesto and expressed their plans to have the Municipality Ordinance amended to function more similarly to local governments in England. Thomas served as their campaign organiser for the 1949 election.

He further described the current ordinance as "not sacred" and that changes could be made to give more power to the Municipal Commission. Thomas also refuted claims from Progressive Party (PP) leader C. C. Tan that the SLP's public challenges were "just a propaganda stunt". In the results of the election, the PP won 13 of the 18 seats, while the SLP only won one; the remaining four were won by independents. At the SLP's annual conference in April, Thomas was elected its president. In May, he criticised the PP's plan to extend the term of office of commissioners describing it as "a piece of shameless opportunism" and that they were "not honest with voters". Thomas also organised a meeting with twenty-five trade unions, where he said he wanted to improve the relations between the SLP and local trade unions as well as encouraged them to vote and have greater participation in the elections. He was a part of the SLP's campaign committee for the December 1949 Municipal Commission election.

During the campaign, Thomas stated that his party's issues were that they stood for social justice, social security, and planned economy, whilst the PP focused on the more appealing free enterprise. He credited them for improving infrastructure and the economy, but also criticised them for creating a class divide, saying that half of Singapore's citizens lived in poverty. He further explained that the SLP intended to create a national plan that would focus on citizens' social needs. In the results, the SLP gained two more seats. In early 1950, Thomas left Singapore to Britain on leave, with some rumours that he may not return, possibly being posted to Penang. He was succeeded by Lim Yew Hock as SLP president. Thomas returned to Singapore in October 1950 after six months. At the 1950 Municipal Commission election, the SLP contested all six wards. Thomas spoke at a rally in Farrer Park about the British Labour Party's achievements and that the SLP aimed to make similar improvements.

In January 1951, the SLP general council expelled campaign organiser M. M. Malai for allegedly "working against the party's candidates"; Thomas was co-opted into the council to replace Malai. During the 1951 general election, at the SLP's final rally, he rebutted against Tan's claims of hypocrisy within the SLP. Ahead of the 1951 City Council election in December, (Note: In September 1951, the Municipal Commission was renamed to the City Council, following Singapore being granted city status via royal charter.) Thomas was appointed in August as their nomination officer, being in charge of submitting their candidates for the election. However, there was contention with the choices of candidates for the election by the current general council, as some believed they had overstayed their tenures and that the new general council – to be decided at their October conference – should be in charge of choosing the candidates instead. Some suggested postponing the conference to a later date, but a majority still preferred an earlier conference. Nevertheless, the SLP planned to contest all six seats.

Further in-fights occurred in the SLP as it was split into two factions; a "left-wing" and a "right-wing". Thomas was reported to have led the right-wing members along with M. P. D. Nair to successfully oppose the left-wing's resolution, which disproved of the proposed ministerial system. The left-wing's members were considered led by E. S. Moorthy, P. M. Williams, and V. P. Abdullah. In April 1952, Thomas was appointed to two committees within the SLP: a committee to draft a constitution for party branches and a committee to raise funds. In June, Thomas was assigned to plan the publishing of a SLP newspaper alongside Williams and Abdullah. In October, he led a three-person group that met with S. Menon, who led a "rebel committee" within the SLP that claimed to have 2,275 supporters. They agreed to hold a special conference but Thomas stated that he would not negotiate with them. Menon stated that the SLP general council had planned to establish party branches and that each branch would nominate their own candidates, but that so far the SLP had failed to erect any branches.

However, later that month, Thomas and four others resigned from the council in protest of the expulsion of Lim as chairman, describing it as "unconstitutional". Following the resignations, the SLP's general council was considered defunct. An ad-hoc committee was established containing the SLP's elected members and Thomas as convenor, a position he took with "reluctance". Furthermore, over 800 members called to expel Williams from the party, with his nomination for South Ward at the upcoming City Council election being considered by Lim "the spark to the trouble within the party". A vote of confidence in Lim was also passed. In December, he rejoined the general council at a party meeting. He also tried to settle the discontent between the two factions of the party. However, Thomas and Lim left the SLP soon after, following further disagreements with the radical Williams-led faction of the party.

=== Singapore Socialist Party and Labour Front ===
From left to right: Lim Yew Hock and David Marshall

At a meeting in November 1953, Thomas was elected as chairman to a drafting committee that would handle the creation of a new political party. Lim stated that the new party would be organised democratically and that "they have to build a strong party to serve [...] with sincerity". It was tentatively named the Democratic Labour Party. Thomas and Lim had planned to create a new party in October, following the convening of the Rendel Commission, which led to the Rendel Constitution. In early November, Thomas invited lawyer David Marshall – in a personal capacity – to inform on the problems they may face creating the party. Although Marshall considered himself a "complete tyro in politics", he was interested in participating in their party.

In early 1954, Thomas and Marshall met with Lee Kuan Yew, Goh Keng Swee, and K. M. Byrne, who planned to form their own political party which later became the People's Action Party (PAP). However, negotiations were fruitless as they did not take Thomas and Marshall seriously nor wanted to work with them. In April, Thomas was invited by the SLP's general council to meet for discussions to possibly merge their parties into a consolidated labour party. He rejected them however, as their sponsors disagreed and because Thomas had conflicting meetings. The Singapore Socialist Party (SSP) was inaugurated on 1 May 1954. In July, the SSP were asked to help in unifying the various labour groups ahead of the 1955 general election. As the head of the SSP's general council, Thomas announced that they planned to form a coalition with other leftist parties to contest in the election, as it was preferred over a merger, though that itself was not completed ruled out either. On August 21, Thomas, Lim, and S. Jaganathan met with the SLP to discuss a coalition.

At that same meeting, they formed the Labour Front (LF). Thomas was a part of a three-man council – alongside V. J. Mendis and C. H. Koh – that led the LF; they pledged not to contest in the election to maintain impartiality. In September, they published their manifesto for the upcoming election, which included equality, economic and social rights, repealing the Emergency Regulations, self-governance, and "malayanisation" of the civil service. At the 1955 general election's nomination day on 28 February, the LF fielded 17 of the 79 participating candidates. During their campaign, Thomas spoke about fighting the "rich man's" parties – the PP and the Democratic Party – and supporting the LF. In the results, the LF won the most seats with ten and Marshall, as the LF's leader, was named the first chief minister.

== Legislative Assembly (1955–1959) ==
As they only achieved a minor majority, Marshall met with governor John Nicoll and asked him to appoint four LF members to the Legislative Assembly under the Rendel Constitution to improve their position. Ultimately, Nicoll appointed two LF members – Thomas and R. C. H. Lim – and two non-partisans. Thomas initially questioned his nomination, but accepted in the interests of the party. However, his nomination was unpopular, as he had previously pledged not to take office. In April, he was included in Marshall's cabinet as the minister for local government, lands and housing. He had been assumed to become the minister for education, given his background in teaching, but it was given to Chew Swee Kee instead.

=== Minister for Communications and Works ===
On 7 April 1955, during the swearing in ceremony of the ministers, Thomas switched portfolios with Abdul Hamid Jumat in a "last minute change" and became the minister for communications and works. The Singapore Standard wrote that Marshall most likely made the shuffle as the alliance (Note: Marshall formed a coalition with the Singapore United Malay National Organisation (SUMNO)–Malayan Chinese Association (MCA) alliance following the nominated members granted by Nicoll, in an effort to strengthen his government. Abdul won Ulu Bedok Constituency as an SUMNO candidate at the election.) insisted that Abdul be given the role of local government, lands and housing minister instead. Thomas was sworn in as a member of the Legislative Assembly at its inaugural meeting on 22 April. At that same meeting, he appeared in informal clothing – a safari jacket, trousers, and sandals – alongside Marshall in an act of defiance against imperialism. In July, he inaugurated a new radio telephone service that provided connectivity between Singapore and Ceylon.

That same month, during a constitutional crisis, Thomas voted in support of a new constitution and immediate self-governance for Singapore. During the LF's annual conference in October, after the elections for the roles of chairman and vice-chairman were invalidated, Thomas, as the prior chairman, took control of the meeting. New elections were subsequently held and he was elected as the first vice-president. In November, he voted in favour of the government in a motion of no confidence, which was supported 19 to 13. During the Merdeka riot in March 1956, Thomas was present and attempted to disperse the rioters. He later praised the police's actions and efforts in handling the riot, stating that they performed "no rough or provocative behaviour" while being attacked by the rioters.

Following the failure of the London constitutional talks in May, Marshall resigned as chief minister, with minister for labour and welfare Lim Yew Hock succeeding him. In Lim's cabinet, Thomas maintained his post as minister for communications and works. At the LF's 1957 annual conference in February, he was nominated for the posts of president and vice-president. However, he later withdrew from contesting for president; he was reelected as the first vice-president. Thomas spoke in support of LF candidate Keng Ban Ee at the 1957 by-election for Cairnhill Constituency, following the resignation of Marshall from the Assembly. At the LF's 1958 annual conference, Thomas was elected as secretary-general.

In August 1958, Lim announced plans to form a new political party, of which it was reported Thomas was opposed towards. The following month, three LF ministers – J. M. Jumabhoy, A. J. Braga, and Chew – publicly supported Lim's new party. However, Thomas stated that he would remain with the LF and continue in his position as minister. He further dispelled rumours that the LF would be dissolved or that it planned to merge with the PAP. In November, the Singapore People's Alliance (SPA) was established, with Lim serving as its chairman and its membership made up of former LF, Liberal Socialist Party (LSP), and Workers' Party members. The SPA subsequently entered a coalition with the SUMNO–MCA alliance and became the ruling government, but Thomas retained his position as a minister despite the fact that the LF had been excluded from the coalition. Lim did not comment on Thomas or the LF's positions.

However, later in January 1959, it was reported that Thomas was planned to resign as a minister from the SPA–SUMNO–MCA government. The Singapore Free Press wrote that Thomas and Lim had been "drifting further apart politically" since the creation of the SPA. Furthermore, LF member and deputy speaker R. C. H. Lim resigned from the party to join the MCA; Thomas was then described as the "only one [left] holding the fort" by The Straits Times. Thomas officially resigned as communications and works minister on 1 February, after being asked by Lim; he was succeeded by the SPA's M. P. D. Nair.

==== Nationalisation of transportation system ====
In May 1955, Thomas spoke on nationalising Singapore's transportation system and supported the creation of a commission to investigate the matter further. He spoke on both the advantages and disadvantages of nationalisation. There were also plans to take over the Singapore Traction Company (STC), though Marshall stated it would be "in due course". However, the PP-dominated City Council voted to takeover the STC in spite of the government's decision. In response, Thomas sent a letter that disapproved of any actions by the Council which might influence the commission's decision and invited two councillors to sit on the commission. PP leader A. P. Rajah subsequently agreed to delay the STC takeover until 1 October, under the assumption that the commission would act quickly in its findings.

However, Thomas stated that the formation of the commission was delayed, as a transportation expert from England's arrival was unavailable due to a recent railroad strike. Thomas further said that nationalising internal airways would be consulted with the Federation of Malaya first; that an internal railway system would be planned alongside residential developments; and that road transport would be researched and recommended by the commission. In September, the transport commission was officially established, with L. C. Hawkins of the London Transport Executive serving as chairman. In February 1956, Thomas said that the transport commission's report was being studied by the government and that a transport policy would be announced soon. Some of the recommendations of the commission included the unification of the transport system under one public-owned authority, after all the bus companies had been acquired.

Later in July, he talked about plans to unify Singapore's bus services in order to achieve a nationalised public transport system. However, his proposal saw opposition from all eleven Chinese-owned bus companies. The Chinese Bus Owners' Association (CBOA) secretary Kwek Seah Eng suggested dividing Singapore into four regions and allowing one company to operate in each region, explaining that it would improve efficiency. On the other hand, the STC supported Thomas's proposal, with general manager A. A. Ewing opining that it would provide better services for passengers. In September, the Standard reported that the government would publish a white paper on public transportation soon and that Thomas would travel to London to study nationalised public transport systems.

He left Singapore on 24 September and returned in late October. In 1957, The Straits Times reported that no progress had been made in unifying the bus companies, with the main issue being a lack of funds from the government or the bus companies. Furthermore, CBOA president Chong Wee Ling stated that the Chinese bus companies were, at present, unwilling to merge their companies, and that such a system would not happen in at least 10 years. Thomas previously said that, if a unification were to occur, the STC would be acquired first. He also noted that the white paper estimated that a unified bus service could only happen after mid-1958. In May 1958, Thomas acknowledged several issues in the bus unification plan and that the government was in a position that prevented it from coming to fruition.

==== Strike management ====
In June 1955, during public transportation strikes, Thomas announced the establishment of a skeleton transport service for students. The Standard reported that it was a "first positive step" to relieve the effects of the Hock Lee bus strike. Following a strike by STC employees in September, the skeleton transport service was reimplemented and Thomas additionally appealed for motorists to help ferry students and workers. He further appealed to the Singapore Bus Workers' Union (SBWU) to allow private buses to be run as it would not be considered strikebreaking and asked STC unionists to persuade SBWU secretary-general Fong Swee Suan to "provide transport services in strike-bound areas."

A Singapore Traction Company trolleybus

The unions agreed to run private buses, but only after the government helped to settle the dispute between the STC and its workers. Thomas subsequently met with the SBWU and the STC Employee's Union (STCEU) and said that STC chairman Sir Thomas Strangman would travel to Singapore to hold negotiations. While the discussions ultimately broke down between the STCEU and Strangman, the Hock Lee Bus Company began running buses that covered the STC's usual routes. Thomas later supported empowering the government with the ability to enforce compulsory arbitration, opining that it could have ended the STC strike early; this came following appeals from Singapore Trade Unions Working Committee (STUWC) secretary Jamit Singh to help "bring about a settlement of the [STC] dispute".

Thomas criticised Singh's compulsory arbitration resolution however, stating that the STUWC was "beginning to look like a big bluff" as they were unclear in explaining what they meant by compulsory arbitration nor did they give details on any of the unions which they claimed supported their resolution; in fact, a statement by the STCEU opposed their resolution. In December, a Court of Inquiry was set up by the government in an attempt to end the STC strike. Thomas was later involved in arranging a meeting with Strangman and an STCEU delegation led by advisor Devan Nair. By February 1956, the STC resumed operations, with the strike officially ended after 142 days.

Another strike by over 10,000 employees of the City Council was threatened in April, when Thomas served concurrently as the acting labour and welfare minister. It began due to a dispute between the City Council and the City Council Labour Unions Federation regarding the new salary scheme; he met with the latter's secretary O. S. Rengasamy and held preliminary discussions with him. However, the Federation later refrained from enacting their planned strike until the return of their legal adviser.

==== Flood prevention ====
In July 1955, Thomas said that – using prior research into Singapore's flooding problems – efforts could be made to reduce flooding, but that it would require expensive construction works. Later in October, he announced it would cost S$60,000,000 to prevent flooding in the city area. The following month, construction work began for a dam in Bedok, following the chief drainage engineer's report on drainage in the Bedok and Ketapang catchments. Thomas was present at the dam's groundbreaking. In July the following year, the government's flood prevention plans were expanded to include the construction of a dual purpose reservoir, where flood water would be collected and therefore increase their water supply. Thomas stated that this scheme would simultaneously prevent flooding and reduce dependence on importing water from Johor.

In November, Bedok was hit with more floods from heavy rainfall, though Thomas noted that the new dam aided in reducing the overall damage to the area, as it was estimated that 600 acres (240 ha) of land would have been flooded as compared to the 100 acres (40 ha) that were actually affected. In December 1957, he appeared at the launching of a seawall at the Geylang River that was constructed under a scheme by the government to stop flooding in the Geylang Serai–Paya Lebar area. Prior to the 1959 general election, Thomas announced in November 1958 that the government would not begin any new flood prevention schemes.

=== Post-ministership ===
Upon his resignation, he returned to teaching at St Andrew's School. He also announced plans to reorganise the LF and confirmed their participation at the upcoming 1959 general election. In March 1959, Thomas was involved in a political scandal regarding SPA education minister Chew. He had previously been told by Chew in 1957 that he obtained US$100,000 (equivalent to $1,146,327 in 2025) for the LF. Furthermore, he also believed that Chew received over US$1,000,000 (equivalent to $11,044,521 in 2025) from the United States's Central Intelligence Agency. Thomas then met with LF members Gerald de Cruz and Arthur Lim, and they decided to inform chief minister Lim about Chew's earnings, but got ignored by him and were asked "why do you want to interfere?".

He then decided to approach PAP leader and assemblyman Lee Kuan Yew with this information. Lee subsequently brought the matter up in the Legislative Assembly "with Mr. Thomas's permission", describing Chew as having received foreign funds and called for a Commission of Inquiry. During that same debate, Thomas crossed the floor and sat at the opposition benches, but left the Assembly after being warned by the speaker that he was not allowed to cross over. Chew later resigned on March 4. Subsequent investigations revealed that Chew had received two payments from foreign sources in 1957 and 1958, respectively, which he then converted for personal use. Historians consider the scandal to have heavily affected the SPA's reputation and to have led to their poor performance at the 1959 general election.

Thomas later explained that he crossed the floor because he considered Lim's response to the allegations to be "ridiculous, incredible, and very dangerous to Singapore" and that there was "no reason why [he] should support the SPA government and that I ought to show [that] as publicly as possible". He further supported Lee's call for a Commission of Inquiry. SPA secretary-general Wang Tsun Hao responded to Thomas's criticisms and stated that he now "abjectly kneels before the PAP and sings its praises". Thomas's term as assemblyman ended on 31 March, on the Legislative Assembly's dissolution.

=== 1959 general election ===
Ahead of the general election, in April, Thomas announced he would contest in Thomson Constituency and had begun canvassing. At the election, he faced S. T. Bani of the PAP and Yap Chin Choon of the SPA in Thomson; overall, the LF fielded three candidates in the election. (Note: The other two candidates standing were See Eng Kiat in Jalan Besar and Victor Louis Fernandez in Serangoon Gardens.) Thomas said at a rally that he believed the election would be a straight fight against the PAP and the LSP, with no other parties having any chance of creating a government. He also considered three major factors against obtaining self-governance to be corruption, political violence, and losing faith in Singapore. Throughout the election, he reported incidences of bottles being thrown at his office and his posters being stoned.

In the results, the LF failed to gain any seats. Thomas placed second in Thomson with 2,581 votes, while the PAP's Bani was elected with 4,978 votes. In February 1960, the LF was dissolved at a special conference, with Thomas stating that the decision was unanimous. LF chairman Tan Soo Hock explained that the current government was carrying out policies similar to the LF's beliefs, and that therefore there was no reason for them to compete. When asked by The Straits Times if he would join a new party, Thomas replied that he was "fully occupied with other work" and that he "shall belong to no party".

== Post-political career ==
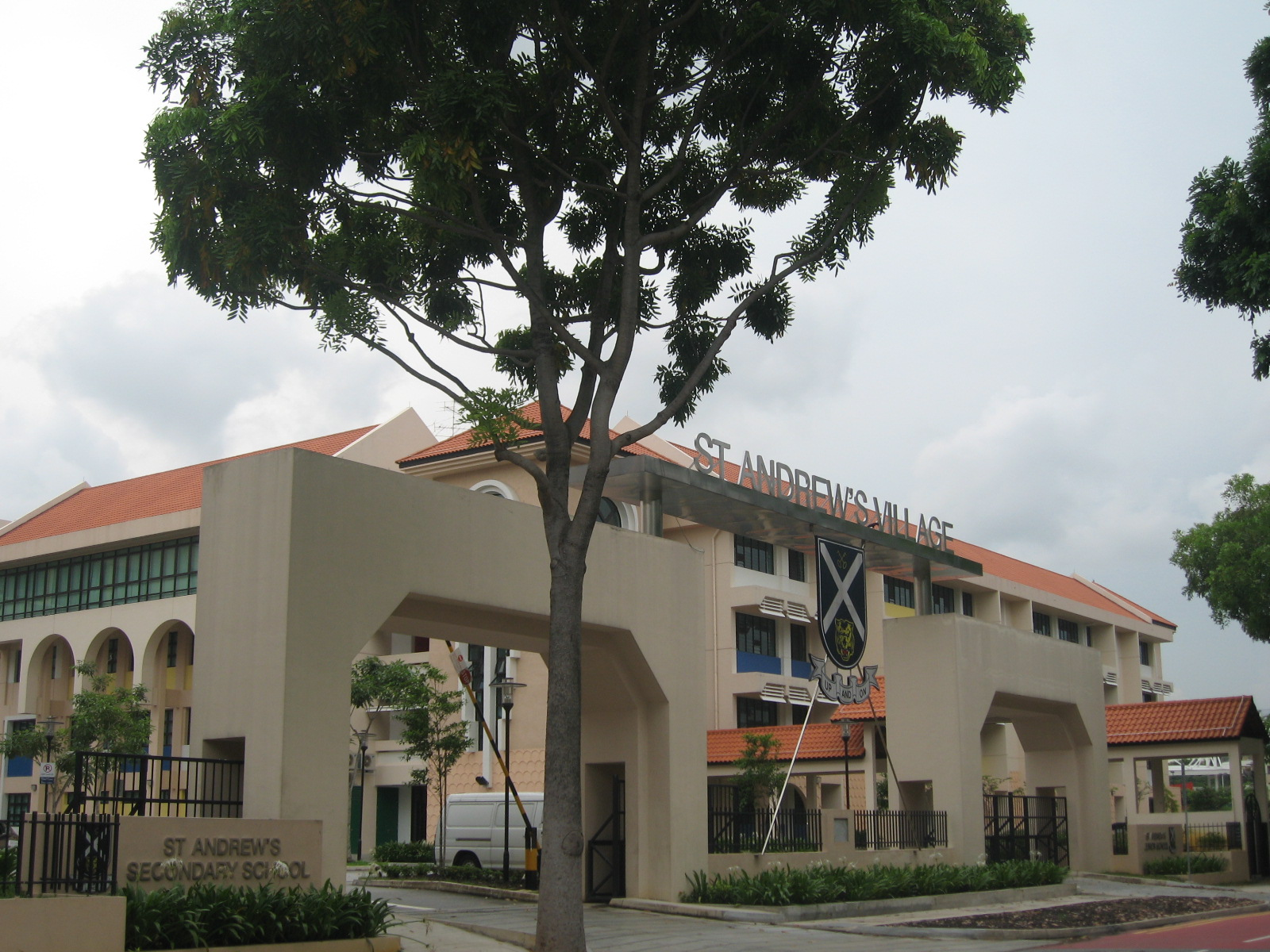
St Andrew's Village (pictured), the current premises of St Andrew's School. Thomas worked at St Andrew's from 1934 to 1975.

In 1961, the Prisons Inquiry Commission released a report that reviewed the current system of the Singapore Prisons Department and made recommendations; Thomas was a member of the commission, having been appointed by the Yang di-Pertuan Negara back in November 1959. In 1962, he was made one of four vice-presidents of the Singapore Arts Society (SAS). He later represented the SAS on a panel that voted on entries to be submitted to a UNESCO poster competition. In 1963, (Note: According to St Andrew's School's website, Thomas became principal and warden of the school in 1963. However, The Straits Times reported in 1973 that it was instead 1960, but also described him as "being the school's principal for the past 10 years" in 1974.) Thomas succeeded Tan Lye Whatt as warden and principal of St Andrew's School. In 1966, he announced the creation of the Children's Charities Association of Singapore, which succeeded the Christmas Fair Committee; he was the chairman of both bodies. He also introduced a new scheme of the Association which would help raise funds by maintaining a fixed S$1,000 monthly donation.

Thomas was made a justice of the peace in 1967. He also announced that sex education classes would be introduced at St Andrew's School and chaired the Anglican Welfare Council, which sought to train teachers in sex education. In 1969, he headed a new course by the Department of Extramural Studies, where he lectured on the administration of schools. Thomas was appointed to the Presidential Council in 1970, which included other members like ministers Lee, Goh Keng Swee, and S. Rajaratnam, and former political leaders C. C. Tan and Marshall. He was a permanent member of the council, whose purpose was to safeguard minority rights and advise the government on certain issues.

In 1971, six articles on Thomas's experiences were published in New Nation by de Cruz, which were called "Memoirs of a Minister". In later years, Thomas adapted these articles into a autobiography titled Memoirs of a Migrant, which was published in 1972 by University Education Press. He was also awarded the Bintang Bakti Masyarakat (Public Service Star) in 1971. In 1973, he announced his intention to retire from teaching, planning to do so in either April 1975 or a different date decided between him and the Ministry of Education. Thomas was later succeeded as principal of St Andrew's School by Christian Jansen in March 1974. He stated he wanted to continue teaching "as long as [he] can", with his contract ending the following year. At his final assembly as principal, he was given a gold medal and was made an honorary scout master of the St Andrew's scout troop.

== Personal life and death ==
Thomas married Catherine Eng Neo Thomas (née Lee) in 1948. They had a daughter on 3 September 1949, Elizabeth; she died four months later on 16 January 1950. They later had two more daughters: Yvonne and Margaret. In 1957, he and his wife became Singaporean citizens; Catherine was from Pahang, Malaya.

On 12 October 1977, Thomas died from cancer. He had been in hospitalised for several months but returned to his home two weeks before his death. A service was held at St Andrew's Cathedral and he was cremated at Mount Vernon Columbarium. St Andrew's School held a minute of silence for him and flew their school flag at half-mast. Former chief minister Marshall paid tribute to him, describing him as a "very honest man" who was "humble and seeking no personal rewards". Defence minister and acting prime minister Goh wrote that "those who know him respect him for his integrity and sincerity". The secretary-general of the National Trades Union Congress, Devan Nair, also paid tribute to him.

At the service at St Andrew's Cathedral, around 700 people appeared, including minister E. W. Barker, Marshall, Nair, commissioner of police Tan Teck Khim, and politician J. B. Jeyaretnam. Further condolence messages came from president Benjamin Sheares and chief justice Wee Chong Jin. In 1978, the Francis Thomas Award was named after him and awarded for the first time at the Shaw Foundation. On the 118th anniversary of St Andrew's School's creation in 1980, a road leading to the school was named Francis Thomas Drive after him. In 2013, his autobiography was republished by Ethos Books and included new photographs and letters provided by his daughter Margaret.
