= Ministry of Local Government, Lands and Housing =

Defunct government ministry of Singapore

Agency overview
- Formed: 1955
- Dissolved: 1959
- Superseding agency: Ministry of National Development
- Jurisdiction: Government of Singapore
- Headquarters: Fullerton Building

The Ministry of Local Government, Lands and Housing was a ministry of the government of Singapore that focused on surveying, planning of towns, and housing. It was established alongside five other ministries shortly after the 1955 general election by the Public Works Department for the party that would end up winning the most seats at the election. It was merged to form the Ministry of National Development following the 1959 general election.

== History ==
In February 1955, prior to the general election to be held that year, the Public Works Department began setting up six ministries that would be headed by ministers appointed by the elected ruling party in the results of the election. This work was previously done at Empress Place, before being divided into ministries. Administrative staff members were also appointed to help the ministries. The Ministry of Local Government, Lands and Housing was established as one of the ministries, with its premises at the Fullerton Building. On 23 March, the government announced J. E. Pepper as the permanent secretary to the ministry of local government, lands, and housing; he previously served as the commissioner for lands. S. T. Stewart was the deputy secretary.

The ministry would oversee surveying, planning of towns, housing, and administration over the islands. In the results of the election in April, the Labour Front (LF) won the most seats, with its leader David Marshall serving as the first chief minister. He unveiled his cabinet on 7 April, with Abdul Hamid Jumat sworn in as the first minister for local government, lands and housing. Francis Thomas was originally intended to serve as local government, lands and housing minister, but swapped portfolios with Abdul and became the minister for communications and works instead. Abdul was a member of the SUMNO–MCA alliance, whom the LF were in a coalition with; the change was most likely made on the alliance's insistence.

Under Lim Yew Hock's chief ministership, Abdul maintained his portfolio in Lim's cabinet. In 1956, as suggested by the Local Government Committee, the Singapore Improvement Trust was to be absorbed into the ministry as a housing agency. At the 1959 general election, the People's Action Party achieved a landslide victory. The Ministry of Local Government, Lands and Housing was subsequently merged with the Ministry of Communications and Works and other departments to become the Ministry of National Development; the latter's first minister was Ong Eng Guan.

== Officeholders ==
Minister	Took office	Left office	Party	Cabinet
Abdul Hamid Jumat; Member of the Legislative Assembly for Ulu Bedok (1917–1978)	7 April 1955	31 March 1959	SUMNO	Marshall
Abdul Hamid Jumat; Member of the Legislative Assembly for Ulu Bedok (1917–1978)	7 April 1955	31 March 1959	SUMNO	Lim
