= David Marshall Cabinet =

Cabinet of Singapore from 1955 to 1956

- 1st Cabinet of Singapore

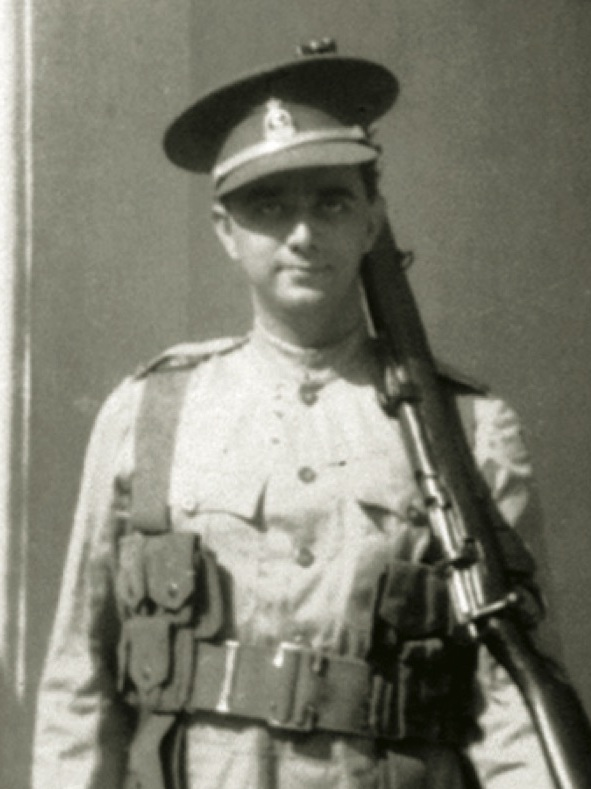
- Date formed: 7 April 1955
- Date dissolved: 7 June 1956

People and organisations
- Head of state: John Nicoll; William Goode; Robert Black
- Head of government: David Marshall
- No. of ministers: 9
- Total no. of members: 9
- Member party: Labour Front; United Malay National Organisation; Malayan Chinese Association
- Status in legislature: Minority 12 / 32
- Opposition party: Malay Union; People's Action Party
- Opposition leader: Lee Kuan Yew

History
- Election: 1955
- Successor: Lim Yew Hock Cabinet

The Labour Front (LF) won the most seats in the 1955 Singaporean general election and was thus invited to form a cabinet. Its leader, David Marshall, entered negotiations with other parties to build a coalition government.

After three days of discussion, a minority coalition comprising the LF, UMNO and MCA was formed. This marked Singapore's first cabinet and a significant step towards full self-governance.

== List of ministers ==
Portfolio	Minister	Political party	Term start	Term end
Chief Minister; Minister of Commerce and Industry	David **Marshall**	Labour Front	7 April 1955	7 June 1956
Minister for Local Government, Lands and Housing	**Abdul Hamid** bin Haji Jumat	United Malay National Organisation	7 April 1955	7 June 1956
Assistant Minister for Commerce and Industry	J. M. **Jumabhoy**	Labour Front	7 April 1955	7 June 1956
Chief Secretary	William Allmond Codrington **Goode**	Independent	7 April 1955	7 June 1956
Attorney-General	E.J. **Davies**	Independent	7 April 1955	5 September 1955
Attorney-General	Charles Harris **Butterfield**	Independent	6 September 1955	7 June 1956
Minister of Health	Armand Joseph **Braga**	Labour Front	7 April 1955	7 June 1956
Minister for Communications and Works	Francis **Thomas**	Labour Front	7 April 1955	7 June 1956
Minister for Labour and Welfare	**Lim** Yew Hock	Labour Front	7 April 1955	7 June 1956
Minister for Education	**Chew** Swee Kee	Labour Front	7 April 1955	7 June 1956
Financial Secretary	T.M. **Hart**	Independent	7 April 1955	7 June 1956

The names in bold are the surnames of Chinese persons, and the personal names of Indian and Malay persons
