= Lim Yew Hock Cabinet =

Cabinet of Singapore from 1956 to 1959

- 2nd Cabinet of Singapore

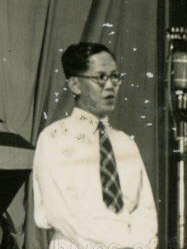
- Date formed: 7 June 1956
- Date dissolved: 3 June 1959

People and organisations
- Head of state: Robert Black; William Goode
- Head of government: Lim Yew Hock
- No. of ministers: 8
- Total no. of members: 8
- Member party: Labour Front; United Malay National Organisation; Malayan Chinese Association
- Status in legislature: Minority 11 / 32
- Opposition party: Malay Union; People's Action Party
- Opposition leader: Lee Kuan Yew

History
- Predecessor: David Marshall Cabinet
- Successor: First Lee Kuan Yew Cabinet

Following the resignation of David Marshall, Lim Yew Hock was appointed by the Governor of Singapore to form the next government. One day after his appointment, he announced his cabinet, which closely resembled that of his predecessor, with only minor changes to portfolio allocations. Notably, he appointed Abdul Hamid bin Haji Jumat as Deputy Chief Minister.

== List of ministers ==
Portfolio	Minister	Political party	Term start	Term end
Chief Minister; Minister for Labour and Welfare	**Lim** Yew Hock	Labour Front	7 June 1956	3 June 1959
Deputy Chief Minister; Minister for Local Government, Lands and Housing	**Abdul Hamid** bin Haji Jumat	United Malay National Organisation	7 June 1956	3 June 1959
Minister for Commerce and Industry	J. M. **Jumabhoy**	Labour Front	7 June 1956	3 June 1959
Chief Secretary	William **Goode**	Independent	7 June 1956	7 December 1957
Chief Secretary	Edgeworth Beresford **David**	Independent	24 January 1958	3 June 1959
Attorney-General	Charles Harris **Butterfield**	Independent	7 June 1956	1 July 1957
Attorney-General	Ernest Pattison **Shanks**	Independent	2 July 1957	3 June 1959
Minister for Health	A. J. **Braga**	Labour Front	7 June 1956	3 June 1959
Minister for Communications and Works	Francis **Thomas**	Labour Front	7 June 1956	3 June 1959
Minister for Education	**Chew** Swee Kee	Labour Front	7 June 1956	4 March 1959
Minister for Education	**Lim** Yew Hock	Labour Front	5 March 1959	3 June 1959
Financial Secretary	T.M. **Hart**	Independent	7 June 1956	3 June 1959

The names in bold are the surnames of Chinese persons, and the personal names of Indian and Malay persons
