= Ministry of Commerce and Industry (Singapore) =

Defunct government ministry of Singapore

Agency overview
- Formed: 1955
- Dissolved: 1959
- Superseding agencies: Ministry of National Development; Ministry of Finance
- Jurisdiction: Government of Singapore
- Headquarters: Fullerton Building
- Child agencies: Department of Fisheries; Department of Agriculture; Department of Veterinary Services; Department of Rural Development

The Ministry of Commerce and Industry was a ministry of the government of Singapore that focused on trade, importation and exportation, and shipping, along with running several departments. It was established alongside five other ministries shortly after the 1955 general election by the Public Works Department for the party that would end up winning the most seats at the election. Its functions were divided into the Ministry of National Development and Finance following the 1959 general election.

== History ==
In February 1955, prior to the general election to be held that year, the Public Works Department began setting up six ministries that would be headed by ministers appointed by the elected ruling party in the results of the election. This work was previously done at Empress Place, before being divided into ministries. Administrative staff members were also appointed to help the ministries. The Ministry of Commerce and Industry was established as one of the ministries, with its premises at the Fullerton Building. On 23 March, the government announced J. B. Clegg as the permanent secretary to the ministry of commerce; he previously served as the director of commerce and industry.

The ministry would oversee trade, agriculture, fisheries, cooperative development, importation and exportation, trademarks, and shipping. In the results of the election in April, the Labour Front (LF) won the most seats, with its leader David Marshall serving as the first chief minister. He unveiled his cabinet on 7 April, where Marshall served simultaneously as the chief minister and commerce and industry minister. To support him, J. M. Jumabhoy was appointed the assistant minister for commerce and industry. In 1956, Marshall held talks with the British, where they made several concessions such as making his portfolio of chief minister independent. As a result, Jumabhoy succeeded Marshall as commerce and industry minister on 7 March 1956.

In June 1956, under Lim Yew Hock's chief ministership, Jumabhoy maintained his portfolio in Lim's cabinet. In November 1958, Jumabhoy joined the Singapore People's Alliance – Lim's new party. The Ministry of Commerce and Industry formerly ran the departments of fisheries, agriculture, veterinary services, and rural development. At the 1959 general election, the People's Action Party achieved a landslide victory. The Ministry of Commerce and Industry's departments were merged with other ministries and departments to form the Ministry of National Development, while the main ministry merged to create the Ministry of Finance.

== Officeholders ==
Minister	Took office	Left office	Party	Cabinet
David Marshall; Member of the Legislative Assembly for Cairnhill (1908–1955)	7 April 1955	7 March 1956	LF	Marshall
J. M. Jumabhoy; Member of the Legislative Assembly for Stamford (1918–2012)	7 March 1956	31 March 1959	SPA	Lim
