= Ministry of Communications and Works =

Defunct government ministry of Singapore

Agency overview
- Formed: 1955
- Dissolved: 1959
- Superseding agency: Ministry of National Development
- Jurisdiction: Government of Singapore
- Headquarters: Public Works Department building, High Street

The Ministry of Communications and Works was a ministry of the government of Singapore that focused on public transportation and public works. It was established alongside five other ministries shortly after the 1955 general election by the Public Works Department for the party that would end up winning the most seats at the election. It was merged to form the Ministry of National Development following the 1959 general election.

== History ==
In February 1955, prior to the general election to be held that year, the Public Works Department (PWD) began setting up six ministries that would be headed by ministers appointed by the elected ruling party in the results of the election. This work was previously done at Empress Place, before being divided into ministries. Administrative staff members were also appointed to help the ministries. The Ministry of Communications and Works was to be located at the old Public Relations Office at High Street. On 23 March, the government announced L. H. N. Davis as the permanent secretary to the ministry of communications and works; he previously served as secretary for defence and internal security.

The government later announced that the Ministry of Communications and Works would be located at the PWB building at High Street. It would oversee public works, telecommunications, meteorology, and rail, road, and air transport. In the results of the election in April, the Labour Front (LF) won the most seats, with its leader David Marshall serving as the first chief minister. He unveiled his cabinet on 7 April, with Francis Thomas sworn in as the first minister for communications and works. Abdul Hamid Jumat was originally intended to serve as communications and works minister, but swapped portfolios with Thomas and became the minister for local government, lands and housing instead.

Under the chief ministership of Lim Yew Hock, on 1 February 1959, Thomas resigned as minister. He was succeeded by M. P. D. Nair of the Singapore People's Alliance. Nair was sworn in on 3 February. At the 1959 general election, the People's Action Party achieved a landslide victory. The Ministry of Communications and Works was subsequently merged with the Ministry of Local Government, Lands and Housing and other departments to become the Ministry of National Development; the latter's first minister was Ong Eng Guan.

== Officeholders ==
Minister	Took office	Left office	Party	Cabinet
Francis Thomas; Nominated member of the Legislative Assembly (1912–1977)	7 April 1955	1 February 1959	LF	Marshall
Francis Thomas; Nominated member of the Legislative Assembly (1912–1977)	7 April 1955	1 February 1959	LF	Lim
M. P. D. Nair; Member of the Legislative Assembly for Seletar (1920–1989)	3 February 1959	31 March 1959	SPA	Lim
