= J. M. Jumabhoy =

Singaporean politician (1918–2012)

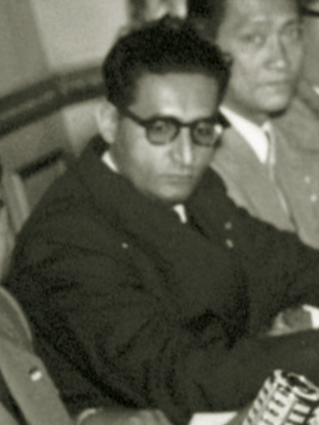
- Jumabhoy at the 1956 constitutional talks in London

Minister for Commerce and Industry
- In office 7 March 1956 – 31 March 1959
- Chief Minister: David Marshall; Lim Yew Hock
- Preceded by: David Marshall
- Succeeded by: Position abolished

Member of the Legislative Assembly for Stamford Constituency
- In office 22 April 1955 – 31 March 1959
- Preceded by: Constituency established
- Succeeded by: Fung Yin Ching (PAP)
- Majority: 1955: 2,691 (43.08%)

Member of the City Council for City Ward (Note: Known as the Municipal Commission prior to 1951.)
- In office 6 December 1950 – 10 March 1956
- Preceded by: Sandy Gurunathan Pillay (PP)
- Succeeded by: Ward abolished
- Majority: 1950: 1,871 (65.8%); 1953: N/A (walkover)

Personal details
- Born: Jumabhoy Mohamed Jumabhoy; 9 September 1918 Bombay, British Raj (present-day Mumbai, India)
- Died: 14 July 2012 (aged 93) Singapore
- Resting place: Choa Chu Kang Muslim Cemetery
- Citizenship: Singapore (from 1957); India (until 1957)
- Party: Singapore People's Alliance (1958–1959)
- Other political affiliations: Labour Front (1954–1958); Independent (1950–1954)
- Spouse: Khairunnisha (m. c. 1948)
- Relations: Rajabali Jumabhoy (uncle)
- Children: 3
- Occupation: Politician; businessman

Jumabhoy Mohamed Jumabhoy (9 September 1918 – 14 July 2012), commonly known as J. M. Jumabhoy, was an Indian-born Singaporean politician and businessman who served as the minister for commerce and industry from 1956 to 1959 in the first Legislative Assembly of Singapore. A former member of the Labour Front (LF), he served as the member of the Legislative Assembly representing Stamford Constituency from 1955 to 1959.

Born in India under British rule, he travelled to Singapore in 1928, where he studied at Raffles Institution and the YMCA School of Commerce. During World War II, Jumabhoy worked as an air raid warden in Katong. He was a member of the Singapore Indian Chamber of Commerce (SICC) and had served as its vice-president prior to joining politics. Jumabhoy made his political debut at the 1950 Municipal Commission election and won City Ward as an independent candidate. He was subsequently elected unopposed at the 1953 City Council election. He contested for Stamford Constituency in the 1955 general election as an LF candidate, being successfully elected. Following the LF's minor majority, Jumabhoy was appointed as assistant minister for commerce and industry in chief minister David Marshall's cabinet from 1955 to 1956, before taking over the role of minister for commerce and industry from 1956 onwards.

He maintained his portfolio in Lim Yew Hock's cabinet, when Lim succeeded Marshall as chief minister. Jumabhoy later joined the newly created Singapore People's Alliance (SPA) in 1958, which was led by Lim. He unsuccessfully contested for Stamford Constituency as an SPA candidate at the 1959 general election, being defeated by the People's Action Party's Fung Yin Ching. He subsequently retired from politics and went on to serve as the president of the SICC from 1978 to 1982 and the chairman of the Working Group on Trade of the ASEAN–Chambers of Commerce and Industry from 1979 to 1981. Jumabhoy retired in the early 1990s and died in 2012.

== Early life and career ==
Jumabhoy was born on 9 September 1918 in Bombay, India, which was then-under British rule. He was the son of businessman Mohamed Jumabhoy. Mohamed was born in India and moved to Singapore in 1915, later serving as the president of the Singapore Indian Chamber of Commerce (SICC) in 1936. He died in 1940. Jumabhoy's uncle was Rajabali Jumabhoy, a businessman who founded the SICC.

Jumabhoy travelled to Singapore in 1928, which was then a part of the Straits Settlements. In Singapore, he lived in a middle-class area at Tanjong Katong Road, and was educated at Gan Eng Seng School and Raffles Institution. He then attended the YMCA School of Commerce. Before and during World War II, he worked as an air raid warden and was stationed at a base in Katong. He remained in Singapore during the Japanese occupation, where he made money reselling second-hand bicycles.

Prior to entering politics, he was a member of the SICC, initially serving as its honorary secretary, then as its vice-president, and then as a committee member; for the latter, Jumabhoy had been elected to the SICC's management committee in April 1950. He had also travelled extensively in the Middle East, to such places as Egypt, Iraq, and Syria.

== City Council ==
=== 1950 Municipal Commission election ===
In October 1950, Jumabhoy announced his intentions to contest in the 1950 Municipal Commission election for City Ward. However, later during the election, he stated that he planned to withdraw. He went to the Municipal Council Chamber to submit his letter of withdrawal, but was interrupted by another independent candidate – Hasan Ali Jivabhai – attempting to submit his papers to run for the election. Due to this interruption, Jumabhoy was not allowed to withdraw as it was past 1 p.m., the closing time for nominations; Jivabhai was unsuccessful as he was also considered late.

Therefore, although initially reluctant, Jumabhoy decided to contest "in-spite of himself". His campaign symbol was a candle, and he contested in City Ward as an independent against the Labour Party's (LP) M. A. Majid, independent Mak Pak Shee, and independent Jamnades J. Metha. On 28 November, he held a rally at Victoria Memorial Hall, where he gave his strengths as his proficiency in English and having a local perspective, having lived in Singapore for many years. At that rally, Jumabhoy also defended the trade industry and explained his independent stance, as he "did not believe in party politics for civic works". In December, the results were released, with Jumabhoy winning City Ward with 732 votes against Metha's 710, Mak's 259, and Majid's 248.

=== First term (1950–1953) ===
As a member of the Municipal Commission, Jumabhoy was appointed to its Finance and General Purposes Committee. In July 1951, temporary sluice gates were tested at drains connecting to the Singapore River, at the suggestion of Jumabhoy. This was to investigate its effectiveness in reducing flooding in the city area. In September, the Municipal Commission was renamed to the City Council, following Singapore being granted city status via royal charter. Municipal commissioners were subsequently known as city councillors. To celebrate the occasion, Jumabhoy was among several councillors who were a part of the City Day Celebrations Committee, and, alongside fellow councillor M. P. D. Nair, encouraged the Indian community to partake in such celebrations.

In February 1952, permanent sluice gates were installed at Telok Ayer, though they only proved to be partially effective in preventing flooding. The following month, Jumabhoy suggested importing pumps from Britain to help with the flooding issue and stated that it was still too early to determine the Telok Ayer sluice gates' effectiveness. In July, Jumabhoy was a part of a nine-member walkout that protested an amendment to the Labour Ordinance by councillor A. P. Rajah. In his amendment, Rajah stated that the council should be made up of 18 elected through elections, with six additional members elected amongst the councillors. Jumabhoy criticised this as beneficial for the ruling party, as they would be able to elect six more members to the council and strengthen their majority. Rajah's motion was later passed.

In April 1953, he called for more housing to be built by the government. He suggested that houses costing S$2,000 to build could be rented out for S$25.00 to help poorer individuals afford housing. Jumabhoy further criticised a motion passed by the Legislative Council that subsidised housing for the poor as "vague". In May, the Queen Elizabeth Walk was opened by the Esplanade, which was created at the suggestion of Jumabhoy back in 1951. In August, Jumabhoy recommended to the government to replace attap houses roofs' with asbestos sheets to reduce the risk of fire spreading through kampongs. In September, he further stated that nine overcrowded kampongs were fire risks.

Ahead of the 1953 City Council election, Jumabhoy confirmed in October that he would contest in the next election. That same month, the Singapore Standard stated that he may be returned unopposed if the Progressive Party (PP) were unable to find a candidate to contest against him in the City Ward. On 5 November, Nomination Day, Jumabhoy was elected unopposed as an independent candidate for the City Ward. He received congratulations and told The Straits Times that "This shows my work in Council has been appreciated. I promise to work even harder than I have in the past."

=== Second term (1953–1956) ===
In 1954, as a member of the council's Estate and Fire Brigade Committee, Jumabhoy announced the construction of a new fire station costing around half a million. In December 1955, since becoming an assistant minister in the Legislative Assembly, Jumabhoy was criticised for neglecting his role as city councillor. He had missed eighteen meetings since his appointment, with calls from some councillors that assembly members should not be able to serve concurrently on both platforms. Jumabhoy defended himself, stating that "we sometimes have to miss some committee meetings" but that "we keep in touch with Council matters by working at home after office". He eventually resigned from the council in March 1956 upon his appointment as minister for commerce and industry.

== Legislative Assembly ==
=== 1955 general election ===
Prior to the 1955 general election, Jumabhoy was announced as a Labour Front (LF) candidate in October 1954, though the constituency he would contest in had not been decided yet; he previously announced his candidacy, though as an independent. He explained his circumstances to joining the LF in a 1983 interview, where he said he did not believe they were a good party, instead that they had good personalities. He had met with LF members David Marshall, Lim Yew Hock, and S. Jaganathan, and joined soon after, though he "had [his] doubts, whether [he] was doing the right thing or not". In the Singapore Standard, Jumabhoy described the LF as a "properly organised political organisation" and that it was time for him to "identify myself with the working class people in the Colony."

At the 1955 general election, he contested in Stamford Constituency against the PP's Nazir Mallal, the Democratic Party's Ng Sen Choy, and independent candidate T. A. Simon. During the campaign period, Jumabhoy held a rally that had appearances from fellow LF members Marshall and Lee Choon Eng. He upheld the LF's four-year plan for Singapore and brought up his experience as a city councillor. Jumabhoy went on to win Stamford Constituency with 2,691 votes, against Simon's 1,281, Nazir's 1,153, and Ng's 1,121.

=== Assistant Minister for Commerce and Industry (1955–1956) ===
Following the LF's minor majority of ten seats in the Legislative Assembly, LF leader Marshall was named as the first chief minister. In April 1955, Marshall announced his cabinet, with Jumabhoy appointed as the assistant minister for commerce and industry. He was to assist Marshall, who held the roles of chief minister and minister for commerce and industry concurrently. Prior speculation was that Jumabhoy would be the minister for communications and works.

In September, he opened the LF's new branch at Bencoolen Street in his constituency, where he announced that the LF were planning to build for four additional branches soon. In October, Jumabhoy headed a 17-member delegation to Indonesia that aimed to discuss a further economic mission that would be sent in December; talks relating to trade between the countries were originally held with Indonesian officials in July. Upon his return, Jumabhoy stated that Indonesia would soon send their own delegation to Singapore. In November, he left on a 14-day visit to India with chief minister Marshall. They discussed improving trade relations between the countries with Indian commerce minister G. Karmarkar.

They returned in December, and he defended some of Marshall's speeches he made while in India, stating that "people in Singapore do not appreciate what he has achieved or the goodwill he obtained from Mr. [Jawaharlal] Nehru for our cause." After Marshall made a trip to London in December to discuss a 1956 constitutional conference date with the British, they also made other concessions, which included making his portfolio of chief minister independent. This left the post of minister of commerce and industry vacant, with Jumabhoy succeeding Marshall on 7 March 1956.

=== Minister for Commerce and Industry (1956–1959) ===
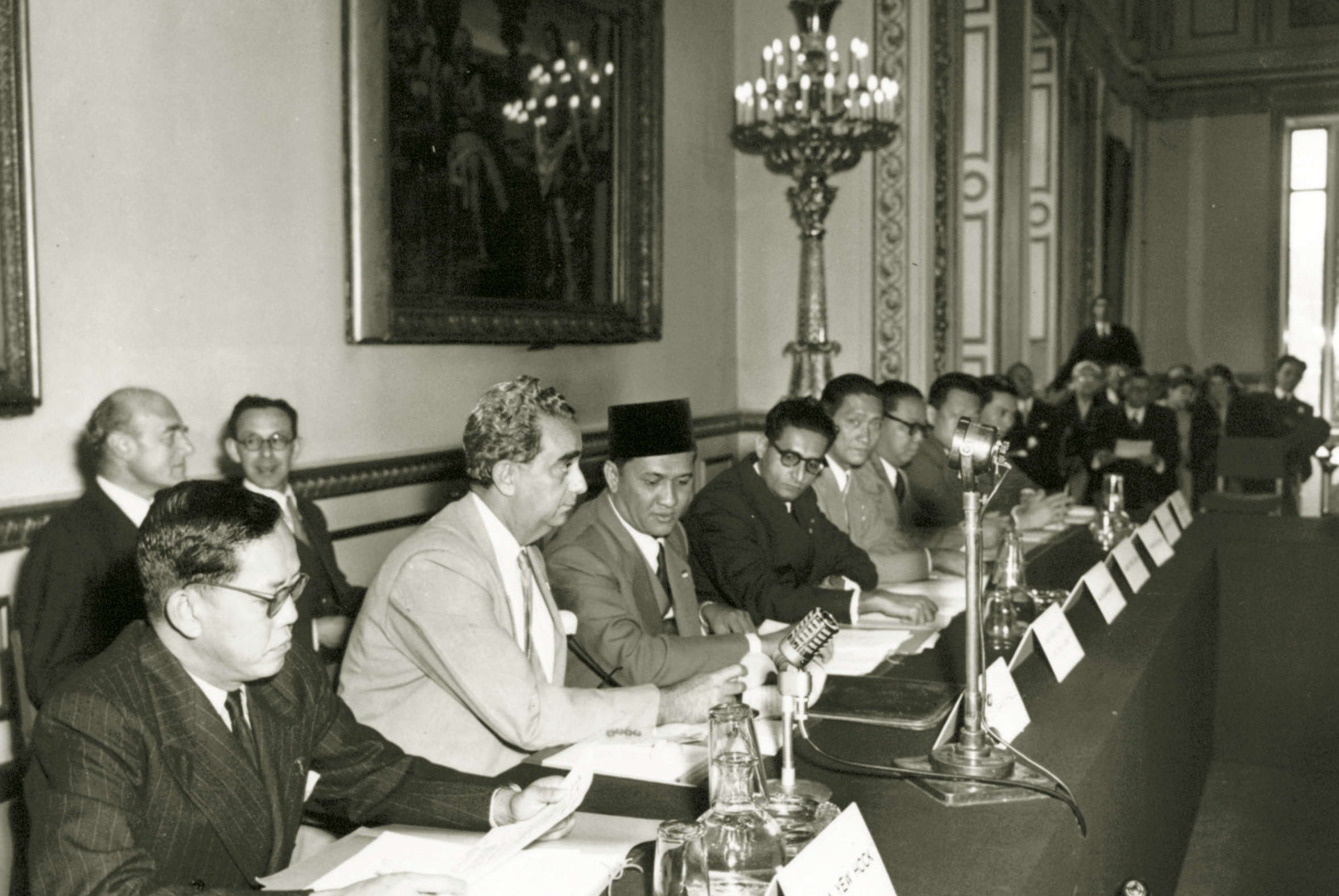
The Singaporean delegation in London, 1956; Jumabhoy is seated fourth from the left

On 17 March, Jumabhoy was announced as a member of the delegation to the 1956 constitutional talks in London, that was headed by Marshall. However, these talks would be unsuccessful and Marshall resigned as chief minister as a result, with minister for labour and welfare Lim Yew Hock succeeding him. In Lim's cabinet, Jumabhoy maintained his post as minister for commerce and industry. In December, he held talks with Federation finance minister H. S. Lee to discuss the recent increase in tariffs from the Federation of Malaya on Singapore, while also encouraging Singaporeans to support locally-made products.

In April 1957, the government rejected an offer by the Australian government to construct a milk plant in Singapore, with Jumabhoy explaining that they would not have enough government funds to run it efficiently; it would have cost S$2 million annually to maintain. However, P. M. Raman of The Singapore Free Press observed that the Marshall government had previously accepted the offer, as compared to the current Lim government. Raman criticised the lack of transparency in ministers' actions. In July, Jumabhoy warned merchants against overpricing the cost of rice, following an exportation ban from the Siamese government. He reassured that the government was looking for alternate supply sources whilst also maintaining their existing stock pile of rice products. He stated that if overpricing continued, the government would enact price controls.

In December, Jumabhoy defended against allegations from opposition members that the government had not been contributing to industrial development in Singapore, where he said that 129 new industrial companies had been established in that year. In April 1958, he held talks with a 22-member Australian delegation, where he pledged cooperation to increase two-way trade between their countries. In August, Jumabhoy announced the government's decision to introduce tariffs and restrict importation, though this would not affect re-exportation. A bill was also created that required external manufacturers to partner with local manufacturers if they wished to create goods in Singapore, along with obtaining a license. Furthermore, he stated that new legislation was being made that provided income tax exemptions on new industries. These measures were enacted to protect and promote local industries, though it would be on a selective basis, depending on the contribution of the business.

In November, Jumabhoy was revealed as a member of Lim's new political party, the Singapore People's Alliance (SPA), along with being a part of its central committee. Later that same month, he returned from a five-week tour of the United States, the Philippines, and Australia, and additionally attended the Colombo Plan Consultive Committee in Seattle. Jumabhoy stated that Australian and American investors had expressed interest in investing in Singapore, but were reluctant due to their unstable politics, mainly concerned if Singapore became extreme left.

==== Cigarette scheme ====
In September, he revealed plans to create locally-run cigarette and match factories to help improve industrialisation. These factories were planned to have about half their shares come from the People's Investment Corporation, which itself would be opened to the general working population and allow them to make S$10.00 shares. The shares of the cigarette factory would be half owned by the public and overseas cigarette companies, which would advise on the manufacturing process. Once complete, cigarette and match imports would be banned, with the factory estimated to produce cigarettes on par to the number of cigarettes imported. Jumabhoy explained that around 160 million cigarettes were smoked monthly, with 90% originating overseas. Therefore, such a scheme allowed Singaporeans to take in those overseas profits, while also providing more jobs. However, some had different views, with Yap Pheng Geck of the Singapore Chinese Chamber of Commerce opining that the local factories would not produce cigarettes of the same quality, while T. A. Hallerstrom, the Swedish consul for Singapore, suggesting that match re-exportation would cease if banned.

In January 1959, People's Action Party (PAP) leader and assemblyman Lee Kuan Yew criticised Jumabhoy's cigarette scheme in the Legislative Assembly, as "nobody is going to make any commitments involving millions of dollars on the basis of promises held out by a government whose term of office will last approximately eight weeks." Furthermore, the Singapore Tobacco Company's chairman J. C. Hosgood disagreed that Jumabhoy's S$5 million cigarette factory would produce S$9 million in profits annually. Jumabhoy defended his estimation and stated that locally-made cigarettes would be of the same quality as foreign brands. In March, however, he reported difficulties in negotiations with the British American Tobacco Company (BATC), which the Singapore Free Press attributed to the rapidly changing political climate in Singapore. The factory, which was provided by the Singapore Tobacco Company, was intended to begin service in January. Jumabhoy stated that it was unlikely negotiations with the BATC would be completed before the next general election.

In a 1983 interview, he explained his suspicions that Lee was involved in some way in halting the negotiations with the BATC, and was later told by a BATC person that they did have talks with Lee. Jumabhoy believed that the PAP stopped him as the scheme would have provided the SPA government with a stake in industry. In the end, the BATC only agreed to sign the agreement after the elections.

=== 1959 general election ===
Ahead of the 1959 general election in April, The Straits Times suspected that Jumabhoy would be fielded in Stamford Constituency, under the SPA banner. During the election, he contested for Stamford against Fung Yin Ching of the PAP, Hooi Beng Guan of the Liberal-Socialists, Ang Meng Gee of the Workers' Party, and independent candidate Wong Chee Lim. At his first rally held at Bencoolen Street, Jumabhoy attacked the PAP as out to "squeeze the capital out of the people" and did not bother to discuss the other candidates. The Singapore Free Press's P. M. Raman stated that the "spotlight" was on Jumabhoy in Stamford and considered the constituency as a "testing ground for [the] SPA". During his campaign, Jumabhoy held road-side meetings and toured the area frequently. He upheld his party's policy and warned against voting for the PAP.

In the results, Jumabhoy lost to Fung, who garnered 5,372 votes as compared to his 3,810 votes. Ang, Hooi, and Wong received 925, 679, and 136 votes, respectively. Following his defeat, he went back to working in his family's trading business. Speaking to The Straits Times in 2007, Jumabhoy remarked that he was "never a politician" and expressed relief with returning to business.

== Post-political career and personal life ==
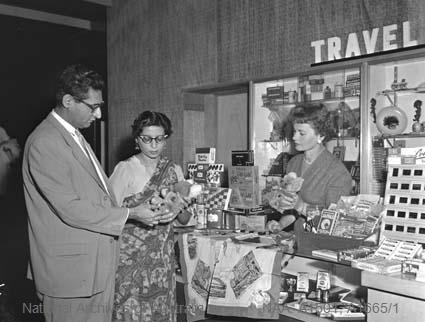
Jumabhoy and his wife in Australia in 1958

In 1960, as managing director of the Malayan Consumer Industries (Federation) Ltd, he announced the creation of a S$200,000 toothpaste factory in Johor Bahru. Jumabhoy served as the president of the SICC from 1978 to 1982. In October 1978, he headed an overseas trade mission of the Singapore Federation of Chambers of Commerce and Industry (SFCCI) to Bangladesh. From 1979 to 1981, he was the chairman of the Working Group on Trade (WGT) of the ASEAN–Chambers of Commerce and Industry (ASEAN–CCI).

As chairman of the ASEAN–CCI's WGT, he stated that research was being made into lightening non-tariff barriers among ASEAN countries. In 1980, he spoke at an ASEAN seminar on trade, where he discussed non-tariff barriers. In 1981, as the president of the SICC, he wrote to the Ministry of National Development and SFCCI concerning the rising cost of rent, suggesting that small businesses would not be able to survive with the current rent expenses. Jumabhoy retired by the early 1990s.

Jumabhoy married his wife, Khairunnisha, in c. 1948 and they had three children. In 1957, he and his wife took up Singaporean citizenship. In 1988, he published a book on religious philosophy titled Why Am I?. He died on 14 July 2012 in Singapore from pneumonia, and was buried at the Choa Chu Kang Muslim Cemetery.
