= Eulindra Lim =

Singaporean graphic designer

Eulindra Lim Chia Neo was a prominent Singaporean graphic designer.

== Early life and education ==
Lim was the eldest daughter of Lim Yew Hock, who served as the Chief Minister of Singapore from 1956 to 1959. In 1958, she left Singapore for London, where she studied graphic arts at Central Saint Martins, the Central School of Art and Design and the London College of Printing, the last of which she graduated from with a diploma. She then left for Switzerland where she furthered her education.

== Career ==
After having spent over four years studying abroad, she returned to Singapore. In July 1966, she was named Best Asian Designer at the Creative Circle Awards, which was held at the Adelphi Hotel. By then, she had been employed at the British advertising agency S. H. Benson as an art director. After leaving S. H. Benson, she began working at International Designs, another advertising agency. By August 1970, she had left International Designs and established her own graphic design company, Eulindra Designs. She specialised in both corporate design and hotel graphics. Her major clients included hotels located in Singapore or elsewhere in the region, such as the Bali Beach Hotel in Bali, Indonesia and the Hotel Indonesia in Jakarta. Other clients of hers included oil firms and banks, for which she designed Christmas cards, brochures and artwork.

At the 1972 Asian Advertising Congress held in Bangkok, Thailand, Lim won a second-place prize in the print-services category and a third-place prize in the packaging category. In 1977, she designed a new logo for the local Public Utilities Board, which replaced an earlier design by Chew Man Cheong. She also designed the logos for the Dynasty Hotel and the Ming Court Hotel, as well as the Oriental Carpet Palace shop, all three of which were located along Orchard Road.

== Personal life ==
Lim married John Nicoll, the creative director of International Designs. She later divorced him.
