= Legislature of Singapore =

Legislature of Singapore can refer to the:

- Legislative Assembly of Singapore (1955–1965)
- Parliament of Singapore (1965–present)
