= Abdul Hamid Jumat =

Malaysian politician

Yang Mulia Tan Sri Tengku Abdul Hamid Tengku Jumat PMN ADK
- عبدالحميد جومت
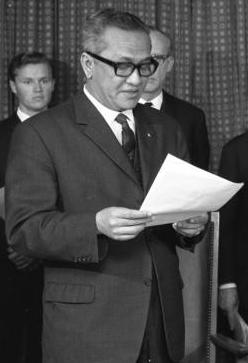
- Abdul in 1965

Deputy Chief Minister of Singapore
- In office 7 June 1956 – 3 June 1959
- Chief Minister: Lim Yew Hock
- Preceded by: Office established
- Succeeded by: Toh Chin Chye (as Deputy Prime Minister)

Minister of Local Government, Lands and Housing
- In office 7 April 1955 – 3 June 1959
- Chief Minister: David Saul Marshall; Lim Yew Hock
- Preceded by: Office established
- Succeeded by: Ong Eng Guan (as National Development Minister)

Personal details
- Born: Tengku Abdul Hamid bin Tengku Mohd Mashoordin Jumat; 12 April 1917 Singapore, Straits Settlements
- Died: 16 April 1978 (aged 61) Johor Bahru, Johor, Malaysia
- Resting place: Mahmoodiah Muslim Cemetery, Johor Bahru
- Party: United Malays National Organisation (Singapore)
- Education: Raffles Institution
- Profession: Politician; diplomat

Tengku Abdul Hamid bin Tengku Jumat (Jawi: عبدالحميد بن جومت; 12 April 1917 – 16 April 1978) was a Malaysian politician and diplomat who served as Deputy Chief Minister of Singapore between 1956 and 1959. Prior to his appointment as Deputy Chief Minister, he served as Minister of Local Government, Lands and Housing between 1955 and 1959. He is also the founder of the United Malays National Organisation (UMNO) in Singapore.

== Early life and education ==
Tengku Abdul Hamid was born on 12 April 1916 in Singapore. His father was Tengku Mashoordin Jumat a police inspector and court interpreter, and his mother was Aishah Hannan. Abdul was educated at Raffles Institution.

== Career ==
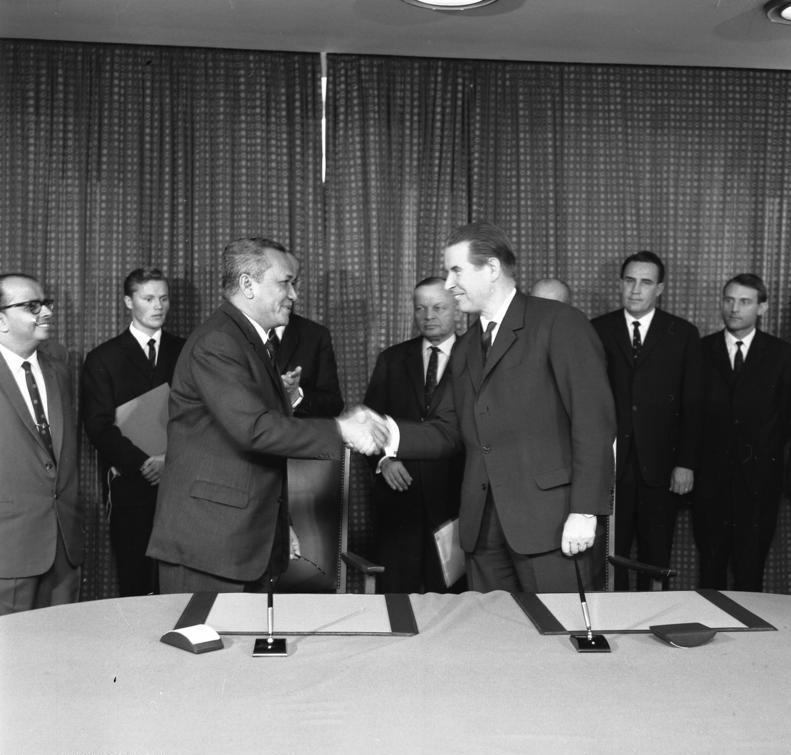
Abdul Hamid as Malaysian Ambassador to the Federal Republic of Germany during the signing of a capital assistance agreement at German Federal Foreign Office, Bonn.

Abdul Hamid first started out as a skins exporter with his own company until around 1955, when he founded the Singapore division of the United Malays National Organisation (UMNO). Abdul Hamid was a member of Labour Front.

Following David Marshall's appointment as Chief Minister in 1955, Abdul was subsequently appointed as Minister of Local Government, Lands, and Housing, though he was initially intended to be Minister of Communication and Works.

Cited as "Singapore's first minister of Malay descent", he hold the position until June 1959. Abdul became the "first Malaysian Ambassador to Germany". He was also the inaugural ambassador to other countries, such as Egypt, the Netherlands, and the Philippines. In addition, Abdul served as Deputy Chief Minister of Singapore between 1956 and 1959.

Abdul has conferred the title of Dato' and the Order of the Defender of the Realm, rank Commander of the Order of the Defender of the Realm.

== Personal life ==
Tengku Abdul Hamid had seven children. His youngest child, Tengku Putra Haron Jumat (born 1963), is a Malaysian politician who is a member of Barisan Nasional.

During his political career, Abdul was an acquaintance with Lee Kuan Yew, although they were not in the same political party.

== Death ==
In 1973, Abdul Hamid went back to Malaysia, where he lived most of his later life as an ambassador to various countries. He died some five years later in 1978.

== Honours ==
=== Foreign honours ===
- Malaya
  - Honorary Commander of the Order of the Defender of the Realm (PMN) – Tan Sri (1958)
- Sabah
  - Member of the Order of Kinabalu (ADK) (1968)
