= Singapore National Front =

Opposition political party in Singapore

The Singapore National Front (abbreviation: SNF) is a Malay-based political party in Singapore formed by exit faction members from Singapore Malay National Organisation members, which was a group of Malay professionals on 15 August 1991.

It did not take part in any elections to date and hence little notability was known to the general public in Singapore, even when it has announced to join Singapore Democratic Alliance in 2011 where its rival was.

Despite its appearance on a day after the Writ of Election for 2011 general election was issued whereby prospective candidates from various independents or various parties had come to collect the relevant nomination papers as a first step to be nominated as a candidate on the nomination day, SNF still failed to send any candidates in 2011 elections, despite being under the SDA banner.
