= Westcote, Gloucestershire =

Civil parish in Gloucestershire, England

Coordinates: 51.882°N 1.682°W

Westcote
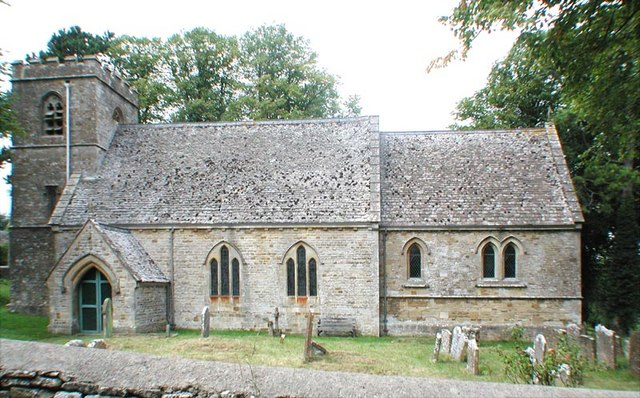
- St Mary the Virgin, Church Westcote

- Location within Gloucestershire
- Population: 208 (2011 census)
- Civil parish: Westcote
- District: Cotswold
- Shire county: Gloucestershire
- Region: South West
- Country: England
- Sovereign state: United Kingdom
- Post town: Cheltenham
- Postcode district: GL54
- Dialling code: 01451
- Police: Gloucestershire
- Fire: Gloucestershire
- Ambulance: South Western
- UK Parliament: North Cotswolds

Westcote is a civil parish in the Cotswold district, in the county of Gloucestershire, England. Church Westcote, the main settlement and the location of the parish church, is about 4 miles (6 km) south-southeast of Stow-on-the-Wold, just east of the A424 road to Burford. To the south and east, the civil parish borders the parishes of Fifield and Idbury in neighbouring Oxfordshire. The other main settlement is Nether Westcote, which has a Methodist chapel and a public house. Church Westcote lies on the Diamond Way long-distance footpath, and the Oxfordshire Way passes through the north of the parish between Wyck Rissington and Bledington. In 2011 it had a population of 208.

== Church Westcote ==
Formerly called Over Westcote, Church Westcote includes the parish church of St Mary, a Grade II listed building and part of the Evenlode Vale benefice of churches. The church was built by the Baskerville family in the 13th century, extended in the 15th and restored in the 18th and 19th centuries. Westcote Manor, a Grade II listed manor house, is at the northern end of the village.

== Nether Westcote ==
Briefly called Chapel Westcote in the past, Nether Westcote includes a Grade II listed Methodist Chapel dated 1852 and a public house, the Feathered Nest. A minor road connects the village to Idbury in Oxfordshire, a distance of less than 1 mile (1.6 km) to the east.
