= Singapore Malay National Organisation =

Singaporean political party

Singapore Malay National Organisation Pertubuhan Kebangsaan Melayu Singapura
- Abbreviation: PKMS
- Chairman: Abu Mohamed
- Secretary-General: Muhammad Hairullah Ahmad
- Founder: Eunos bin Abdullah
- Founded: 1951; 75 years ago (as UMNO Singapore) 19 March 1967; 59 years ago (as PKMS)
- Split from: United Malays National Organisation (UMNO)
- Headquarters: 218F Changi Road PKMS Building, Singapore 419737
- Youth wing: Pemuda PKMS
- Women's wing: Wanita PKMS
- Ideology: Ketuanan Melayu; Islamism; Social conservativism
- National affiliation: Alliance (1951–1965); Singapore Democratic Alliance
- Colours: Red
- Slogan: Bersatu, Bersetia, Berkhidmat
- Parliament: 0 / 108 (0%)

Website
- https://www.pkms.org.sg/

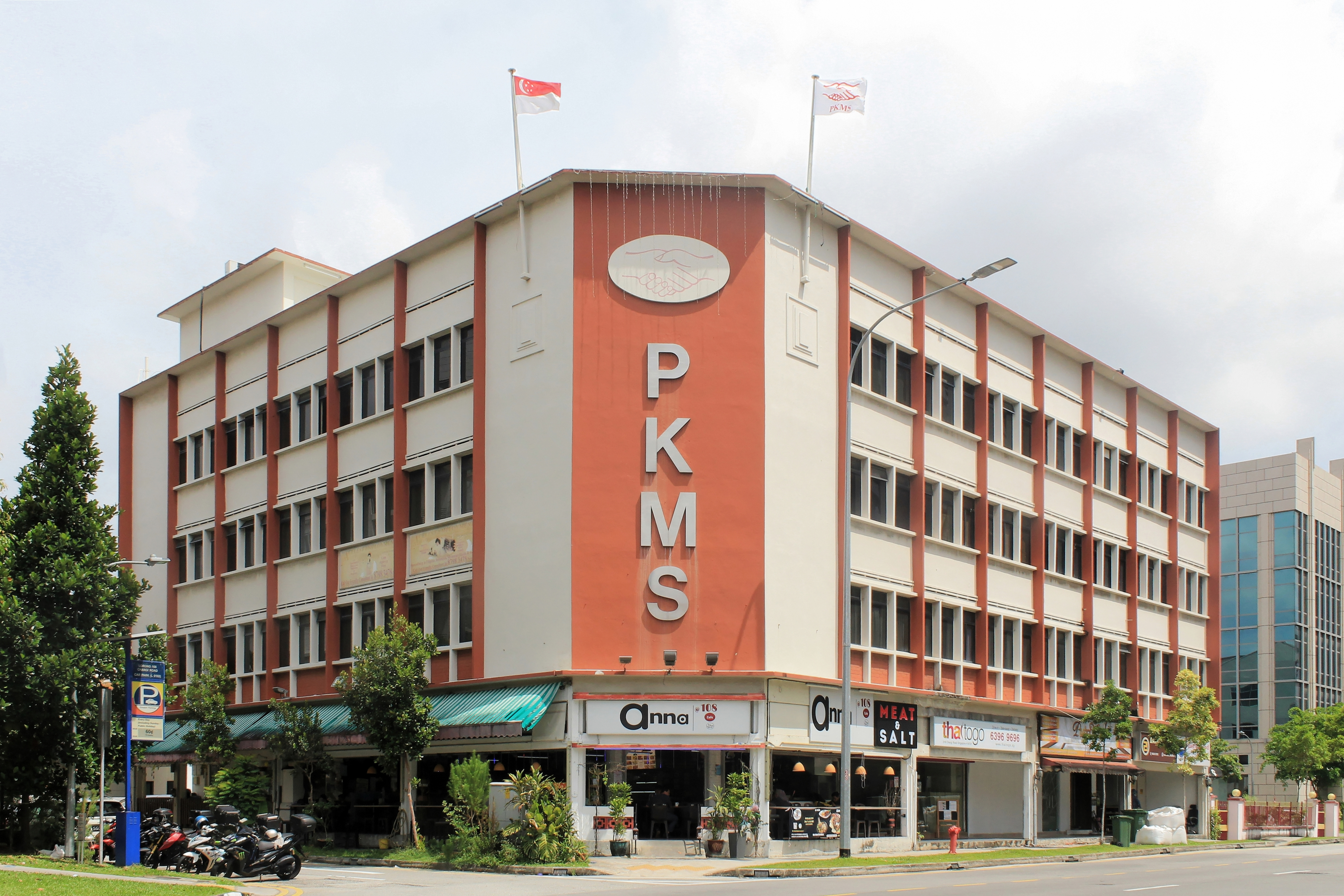
The headquarters of Singapore Malay National Organisation at Changi Road.

The Singapore Malay National Organisation (Malay: Pertubuhan Kebangsaan Melayu Singapura; abbrev: PKMS / SMNO / UMNOS or SUMNO) is a political party in Singapore.

== History ==
The origins of Pertubuhan Kebangsaan Melayu Singapura (PKMS) were rooted in the Singapore Malay Union (KMS), which was founded in 1926 by Mohamed Eunos bin Abdullah to represent Malay interests. Following the Second World War, the KMS opposed the proposed Malayan Union and merged into the United Malay National Organisation (UMNO), which would become dominant in federal politics.

Despite its KMS's connections, the modern PKMS operated as an extension of the Johor Bahru branch of federal UMNO. It contested the 1955 Singapore general election and secured one seat at Ulu Bedok. By the 1959 Singapore general election, UMNO had gained three seats in the Malay-dominated electorates of Geylang Serai, Kampung Kembangan, and the Southern Islands. On 20 February 1961, it became officially registered as the Singapore United Malay National Organisation (SUMNO).

SUMNO subsequently joined the Singapore Alliance Party (SA), which was also an extension of the larger federal Alliance Party, with local branches of the Malayan Chinese Association and the Malayan Indian Congress, and former Chief Minister Lim Yew Hock's Singapore People's Alliance. In line with the pro-Malay communal policies of its parent organisation, PKMS became a vocal opponent of Lee Kuan Yew's People's Action Party, which it accused of promoting Chinese chauvinism and discriminating against Malays. However, it also shared some of the PAP's policies, such as supporting merger with Malaysia and anti-Communism.

The SA contested the 1963 general election, but performed poorly and lost the seven seats held under its constituent parties. The fallout from this electoral defeat contributed to sharply deteriorating relations between the federal government in Kuala Lumpur and the Singapore state government which culminated in the 1964 race riots that ultimately resulted in Singapore's expulsion from Malaysia in September 1965.

On 19 March 1967, PKMS assumed its current name, after the Singapore government passed a new law banning local parties from operating as branches of foreign organisations. However, PKMS continued to maintain ties with its parent organisation, UMNO. During the 1968 general election, the PKMS did not file any nominations and supported Barisan Sosialis's electoral boycott of the Singapore Parliament. PKMS did not win any seats in further elections.

On 3 July 2001, the PKMS joined a political coalition known as the Singapore Democratic Alliance, which included the Singapore Justice Party, Singapore People's Party, the Singapore National Front and the National Solidarity Party. Throughout its history, the party has experienced substantial internal infighting. However, it all ended with a court order on 22 March 2012 which gave Abu Mohamed and the Supreme Council the rights to administer the office.

== Leadership ==
- President: Abu bin Mohamed
- Deputy President: Ismail bin Yacoob
- Vice-President 1: Malik Bin Ismail
- Vice-President 2: Kuswadi Bin Atnawi
- Secretary-General: Muhammad Hairullah Bin Ahmad
- Head of Youth Wing: Hasly Hashim
- Head of Women Wing: Roziah Barik

== Election results ==
=== Parliament ===
Election	Leader	Votes	%	Seats					Position	Result
Election	Leader	Votes	%	Contested			Total	+/–	Position	Result
Election	Leader	Votes	%	Seats	Won	Lost	Total	+/–	Position	Result
1972	Ahmad Taff	10,054	1.3%	2	0	2	0 / 65	0	6th	No seats
1976	Selamat Shamsuri	9,230	▼1.2%	2	0	2	0 / 69	0	6th	No seats
1980	Abdul Rahman Zin	13,435	▲2.1%	4	0	4	0 / 75	0	6th	No seats
1984	Abdul Rahman Zin	4,768	▼0.5%	1	0	1	0 / 79	0	▼8th	No seats
1988	Ibrahim Ariff	13,526	▲1.0%	4	0	4	0 / 81	0	▲7th	No seats
1991	Sahid Sahooman	12,862	▲1.6%	4	0	4	0 / 81	0	▲6th	No seats
