= Labour Front =

- Malay name: Barisan Buroh
- Chinese name: 勞工陣綫; Láogōng Zhènxiàn
- Tamil name: தொழும் முன்னணி Toḻum muṉṉaṇi
- English name: Labour Front
- Founder: David Saul Marshall; Lim Yew Hock; Francis Thomas
- Founded: 21 August 1954; 72 years ago
- Dissolved: 28 February 1960; 66 years ago
- Split from: Labour Party
- Succeeded by: Workers' Party
- Ideology: Social democracy; Democratic socialism; Progressivism; Left-wing nationalism; Anti-imperialism
- Political position: Centre-left to left-wing

The Labour Front (abbreviation: LF), was a political party in Singapore that operated from 1955 to 1960. It won the 1955 legislative assembly election, and lasted for one term as the ruling coalition.

== History ==
LF was founded on 25 August 1954, as an alliance between the Singapore Labour Party (SLP) and the Singapore Socialist Party (SSP), the latter was itself an offshoot from SLP. LF was created to contest the 1955 legislative election by David Marshall, Singapore's first chief minister and Lim Yew Hock, Singapore's second chief minister. LF had called for self-government through unity with the Federation of Malaya, creation of citizenship and setting up a welfare state with housing loans, medical services, unemployment insurance and minimum wage. It also wanted to repeal the emergency regulations and amend the trade union ordinance for greater autonomy. A centre-left grouping, LF won 10 out of 25 elected seats in the legislative assembly and formed the first elected government of Singapore, which at that time was a British crown colony.

In April 1956, Marshall led an all-party delegation to London for talks with the British, in the first of what would later be known as the Merdeka talks. The talks resulted in a deadlock as both sides refused to compromise on the security arrangements. Marshall's administration failed to gain approval from Britain for Singapore's independence; in taking responsibility for the failure, Marshall resigned in April 1956; and soon went on to form the Workers' Party. Critics believed that the British were not convinced of Marshall's ability to govern Singapore well and deal with the rising threat of insurgency carried out in the name of communism. Marshall was succeeded by his deputy, Lim.

The LF-alliance government had faced various challenges in the nascent years of local governance. Apart from the threat of the underground communist movement, Singapore faced problems in public order, poor economy, poor housing and sanitation, low living standards and government corruption. The then-opposition People's Action Party (PAP), led by Lee Kuan Yew, grilled the LF-alliance government several times on these issues in the legislative assembly sessions. Nevertheless, the LF-alliance government were able to implement a slew of measures that improved workers' welfare, such as ratifying the labour code, and establishing the Central Provident Fund, Meet-the-People Sessions and Legal Aid Bureau. It was also credited with inculcating nationalistic sentiments into the populace, in lieu of colonial subservience, and resolving various constitutional challenges such as citizenship, Chinese education, and language. Through the Merdeka talks, Marshall had also set the framework to direct future negotiations towards realizing full independence.

Under Lim's leadership, the LF-alliance government had ruthlessly suppressed the Chinese school rioters in October 1956, and many pro-communist union leaders in the PAP were detained under the Internal Security Act. The tough measures may have alienated a large portion of the Chinese speaking electorate. In 1957 and 1958, two all-party delegations led by Lim eventually negotiated Singapore's status to be a self-governing state with a Yang di-Pertuan Negara, to represent the titular head of state as Yang di-Pertuan Negara of Singapore. In 1959, the majority of LF led by Lim, left the core party to merge with the Liberal Socialists to form the Singapore People's Alliance (SPA). In the 1959 elections, the PAP won 43 of 51 seats in the legislative assembly, with a popular vote of 53%, having campaigned on an anti-colonial platform with an ambition to initiate reforms to improve the economy and living standards of the people, as well as eradicate corruption in the government. The SPA lost power and was reduced to only a handful of seats in opposition, while the residual LF was reduced to a very small fraction of the original party and was eventually dissolved in 1960.

== Election results ==
=== Legislative Assembly ===
| Election | Leader | Votes | % | Seats^{1} | | | | | | Nominated | Position | Result |
| Election | Leader | Votes | % | Up for Contest | Contested | | | Total | +/– | Nominated | Position | Result |
| Election | Leader | Votes | % | Up for Contest | Seats | Won | Lost | Total | +/– | Nominated | Position | Result |
|---|---|---|---|---|---|---|---|---|---|---|---|---|
| 1955 | David Marshall | 42,300 | 27.06% | 25 | 17 | 10 | 7 | 10 / 25 | ▲10 | 2 / 4 | ▲1st | Coalition Gov't^{2} |
| 1959 | Francis Thomas | 3,414 | 0.65% | 51 | 3 | 0 | 3 | 0 / 51 | ▼10 | —N/a | ▼7th | No seats |

1. 1955 election: 25 of the 32 seats are directly-elected, 4 are nominated and 3 are ex-officio. 1959 election: All 51 seats are directly-elected.
2. Coalition government was formed with LF's 10 elected and 2 nominated members (12 seats), UMNO (1 seat), MCA (1 seat), and ex-officio (3 seats).

==== Seats contested ====
| Election | Constituencies contested | Contested vote % | Swing |
|---|---|---|---|
| 1955 | Bukit Panjang, Bukit Timah, Cairnhill, Changi, Farrer Park, Geylang, Havelock, Kampong Kapor, Katong, Pasir Panjang, Queenstown, Rochore, Seletar, Stamford, Tanglin, Telok Ayer, Whampoa | 38.7% | - |
| 1959 | Jalan Besar, Serangoon Gardens, Thomson | 11.7% | ▼27.0% |

=== Legislative Assembly by-election ===
| Election | Leader | Constituency contested | Votes | % | Seats | | | | Result |
| Election | Leader | Constituency contested | Votes | % | Contested | | Total | +/– | Result |
| Election | Leader | Constituency contested | Votes | % | Won | Lost | Total | +/– | Result |
|---|---|---|---|---|---|---|---|---|---|
| 1957 | Lim Yew Hock | Cairnhill | 1,118 | 19.2% | 0 | 1 | 0 / 1 | Steady | Lost |

=== City Council ===
| Election | Votes | % | Seats | | | | | |
| Election | Votes | % | Up for Contest | Contested | | | Total | +/– |
| Election | Votes | % | Up for Contest | Seats | Won | Lost | Total | +/– |
|---|---|---|---|---|---|---|---|---|
| 1957 | 25,711 | 15.90% | 32 | 16 | 4 | 12 | 4 / 32 | ▲4 |
| 1958 | 3,566 | 43.47% | 1 | 1 | 0 | 1 | 4 / 32 | Steady |

== Prominent members ==
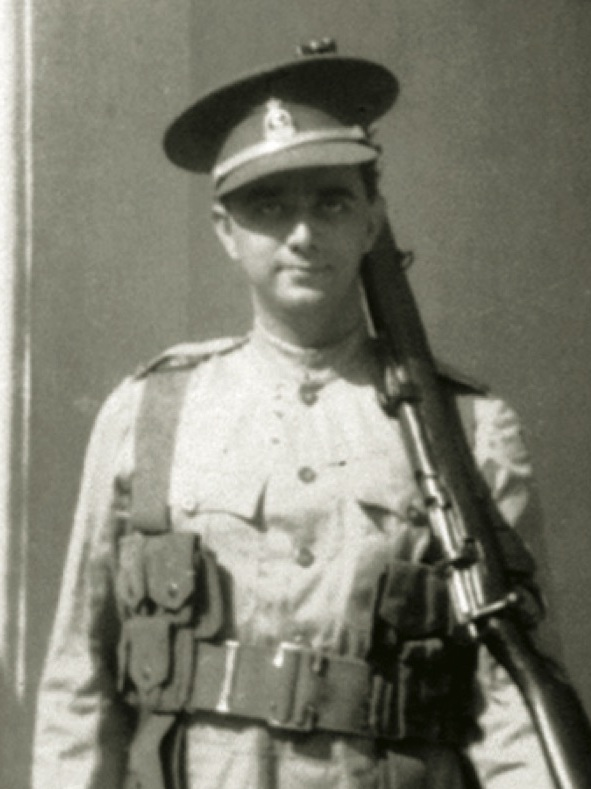
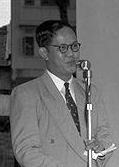
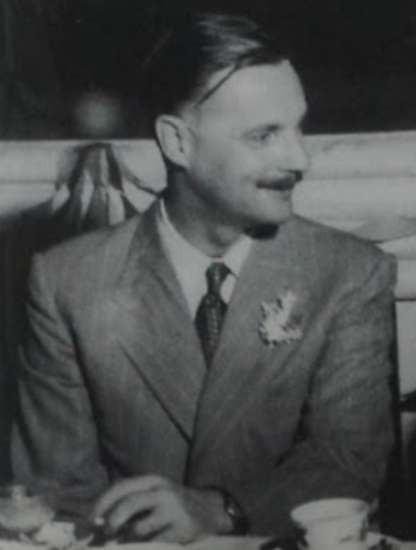
(L–R) David Marshall, Lim Yew Hock, and Francis Thomas, the three founders of Labour Front.
- David Marshall, first Chief Minister, member of the first Legislative Assembly of Singapore representing Cairnhill
- Lim Yew Hock, second Chief Minister, Minister for Labour and Welfare (1955–1959), member of the second Legislative Council of Singapore representing Keppel, member of the first Legislative Assembly of Singapore representing Havelock, member of the second Legislative Assembly of Singapore representing Cairnhill
- Francis Thomas, Minister for Communications and Works (1955–1959), Principal of St. Andrew's Secondary School (1963–1974)
- A. J. Braga, Minister of Health (1955–1959), member of the first Legislative Assembly of Singapore representing Katong
- Chew Swee Kee, Minister of Education (1955–1959), member of the first Legislative Assembly of Singapore representing Whampoa
- Jumabhoy Mohamed Jumabhoy, Minister for Commerce and Industry (1955–1959), member of the first Legislative Assembly of Singapore representing Stamford, President of the Singapore Indian Chamber of Commerce (1978 - 1992)
- A. R. Lazarous, member of the first Legislative Assembly of Singapore representing Farrer Park
- Mak Pak Shee, member of the first Legislative Assembly of Singapore representing Geylang
- Seah Peng Chuan, member of the first Legislative Assembly of Singapore representing Kampong Kapor
- Tan Theng Chiang, member of the first Legislative Assembly of Singapore representing Rochore
- Lee Choon Eng, member of the first Legislative Assembly of Singapore representing Queenstown
