= Chief Minister of Singapore =

Head of government of the Crown colony of Singapore from 1955 to 1959

- Coat of arms of the Colony of Singapore
- Style: The Honourable
- Type: Head of government
- Residence: Old Parliament House
- Appointer: Governor of Singapore
- Formation: 7 April 1955; 71 years ago
- First holder: David Saul Marshall
- Final holder: Lim Yew Hock
- Abolished: 3 June 1959; 67 years ago
- Succession: Prime Minister of Singapore

The chief minister of Singapore was the head of government of the Colony of Singapore until its abolition on 3 June 1959. It was replaced by the office of Prime Minister. The chief minister was appointed by the governor of Singapore. The chief minister was the party leader of the majority in the Legislative Assembly.

== Background ==
In February 1955, a new constitution, the Rendel Constitution, was implemented. Singapore would create its first Legislative Assembly with majority of the seats popularly elected, to replace the existing Legislative Council. 25 out of 32 seats would be elected by the general populace, four seats would be allocated to unofficial members appointed by the governor, three seats taken by ex officio members, respectively the chief secretary, attorney-general and financial secretary, while the remaining seat would be for the unofficial speaker of the Assembly nominated by the governor.

Moreover, the office of Chief Minister was added, which would be assumed by the leader of the majority party in the Assembly, sharing the responsibility with Chief Secretary, Attorney-General and Financial Secretary.

The chief secretary continued to take control over areas such as foreign affairs, defense, administration, internal security, broadcasting and public relations, whereas the power of policy-making for the people's welfare lay in the hands of the chief minister.

== List of chief ministers ==
| № | Name | Term of office | | Political party | Government | Elected |
| № | Name | Took office | Left office | Political party | Government | Gen. |
|---|---|---|---|---|---|---|
| 1 | David Marshall (1908–1995); Assemblyman for Cairnhill | 7 April 1955 | 7 June 1956 | LF | Marshall I LF–UMNO-MCA | 1955 |
| 1 | David Marshall (1908–1995); Assemblyman for Cairnhill | The first Chief Minister of Singapore, he led the Labour Front to victory in the 1955 general election. His chief ministership was marked with strikes and riots, a constitutional crisis, and internal issues. He resigned due to the failed Merdeka mission. | | | | |
| 2(1) | Lim Yew Hock (1914–1984); Assemblyman for Havelock | 8 June 1956 | 3 June 1959 | LF | Lim I LF–UMNO-MCA (1956–1958); SPA–UMNO-MCA (1958–1959) | – |
| 2(1) | Lim Yew Hock (1914–1984); Assemblyman for Havelock | 8 June 1956 | 3 June 1959 | SPA | Lim I LF–UMNO-MCA (1956–1958); SPA–UMNO-MCA (1958–1959) | – |
| 2(2) | Lim Yew Hock (1914–1984); Assemblyman for Havelock | The second and last Chief Minister of Singapore. He served as Minister of Labour and Welfare in David Marshall's Cabinet and concurrently held this position as Chief Minister. He led the breakout from the Labour Front to form the Singapore People's Alliance. | | | | |

== See also ==
- Governor of Singapore
- Chief Secretary of Singapore
- Prime Minister of Singapore
