= Legislative Assembly of Singapore =

Legislature of Singapore (1955–1965)

Legislative Assembly of the State of Singapore Dewan Undangan Singapura 新加坡立法議會 சிங்கப்பூர் சட்டமன்றம்

Type
- Type: Unicameral

History
- Established: 2 June 1955; 70 years ago
- Disbanded: 9 August 1965; 60 years ago
- Preceded by: Legislative Council of Singapore
- Succeeded by: Parliament of Singapore

Elections
- Last election: 21 September 1963; 62 years ago

Meeting place
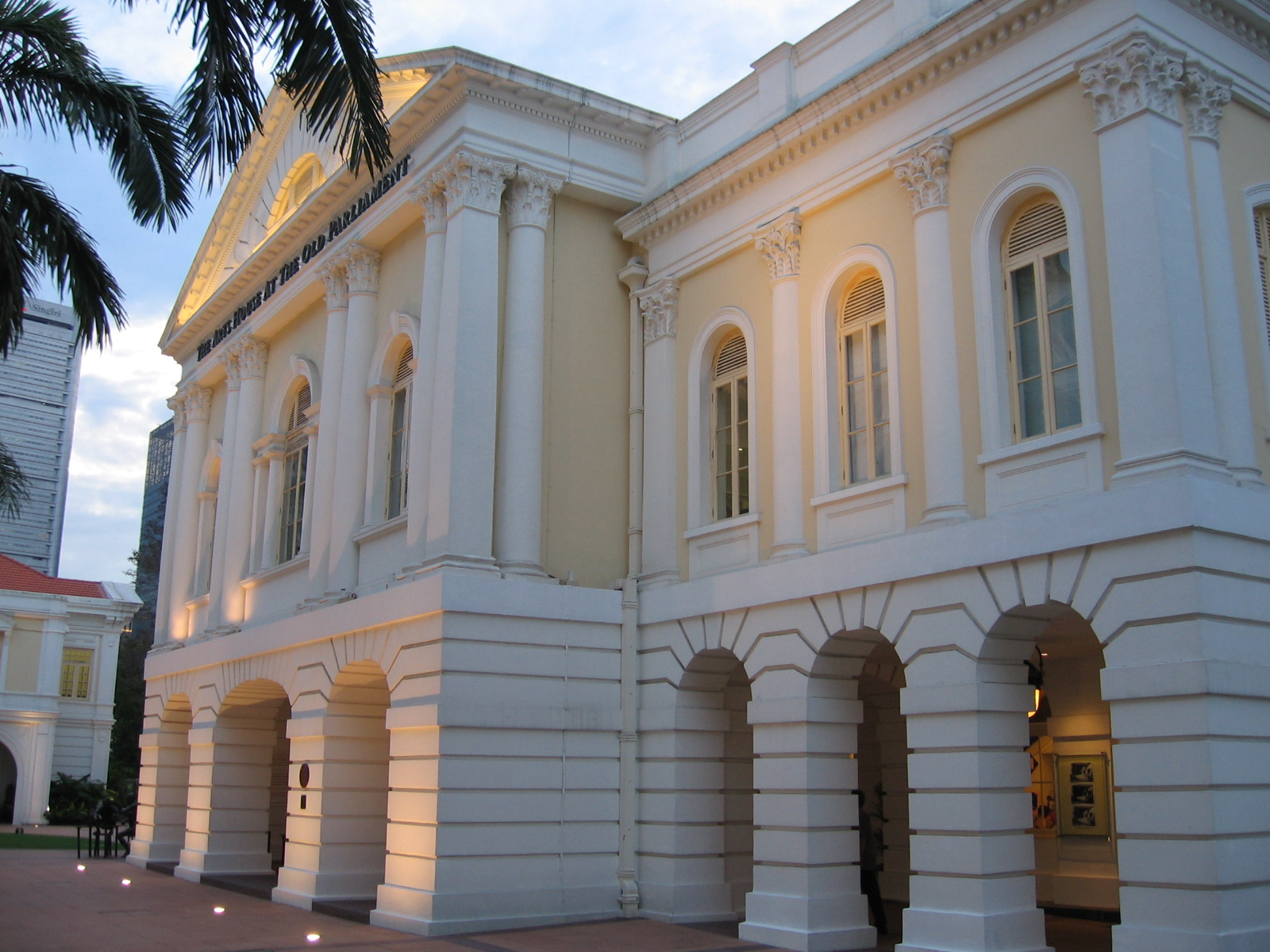
- Old Parliament House, Singapore

The Legislative Assembly of Singapore was the unicameral legislature that governed Singapore from 1955 to 1965 during its transition from a British colony to a self-governing state. Established under the Rendel Constitution, it marked a significant shift toward representative government, with a majority of its members elected by the public. The Assembly underwent constitutional reforms in 1958 to provide for full internal self-government, and it functioned as the legislature of the State of Singapore until the country's full independence in 1965. It was then succeeded by the Parliament of Singapore, which continues to serve as the country's legislative authority.

== Overview ==
The Rendel Constitution first came into effect following the 1955 general election, marking a significant step in Singapore's constitutional development. It replaced the Legislative Council, featuring a substantial increase in elected representation. Of the 32 seats in the Legislative Assembly, 25 were filled through direct elections, while the remaining 7 were appointed by the British colonial administration. This marked a shift from the previous structure, in which most members were nominated rather than elected. Despite this move toward greater self-governance, the British retained considerable authority, including the power of veto and control over key areas such as internal security, foreign affairs and defence.

== History ==
Ongoing political agitation for greater self-governance in Singapore intensified during the 1950s. Chief Minister David Marshall, who led the Labour Front government formed after the 1955 general election, initiated constitutional talks with the British government in 1956. However, his first delegation to London failed to secure full internal self-government due to concerns over Singapore's political stability and public order. Marshall resigned following this failure, as he had pledged to do if the mission was unsuccessful.

His successor, Lim Yew Hock, adopted a more hardline approach to internal security and took action against left-wing trade unions and pro-communist elements, measures that reassured the British authorities of Singapore's administrative capability. Under Lim's leadership, renewed negotiations with the British culminated in the 1958 Constitutional Agreement, formally known as the Singapore (Constitution) Order in Council 1958. This agreement led to amendments to the Constitution, providing for a fully elected Legislative Assembly with 51 seats and granting the colony full internal self-government, except in the areas of defence and foreign affairs, which remained under British control.

The new constitutional framework took effect after the 1959 general election, in which the People's Action Party (PAP) won a decisive victory. This marked the beginning of self-governing rule under Lee Kuan Yew with the newly created position of Prime Minister. The Legislative Assembly, now operating with significantly expanded powers, functioned as the primary law-making body of the state.

Following Singapore's separation from Malaysia and the declaration of independence on 9 August 1965, the Legislative Assembly was formally reconstituted as the Parliament of Singapore under the country's new constitutional framework. The existing members of the Assembly became the first Members of Parliament (MPs), ensuring institutional continuity as a newly sovereign nation.

== List of sessions ==
Legislative Assembly	Commenced	Session	Session dates	Dissolved	By-elections
1st (1955)	22 April 1955	1st	22 April 1955 – 7 June 1956	31 March 1959	1957
1st (1955)	22 April 1955	2nd	29 August 1956 – 8 January 1958	31 March 1959	1957
1st (1955)	22 April 1955	3rd	9 April 1958 – 19 March 1959	31 March 1959	1957
2nd (1959)	1 July 1959	1st	1 July 1959 – 1 June 1960	3 September 1963	1961 (April, July)
2nd (1959)	1 July 1959	2nd	20 July 1960 – 20 July 1961	3 September 1963	1961 (April, July)
2nd (1959)	1 July 1959	3rd	31 October 1961 – 13 July 1962	3 September 1963	1961 (April, July)
2nd (1959)	1 July 1959	4th	27 March 1963 – 1 August 1963	3 September 1963	1961 (April, July)
3rd (1963)	22 October 1963	1st	22 October 1963 – 16 June 1965	7 December August 1965 (Disbanded)	1965

== See also ==
- Legislative Council of the Straits Settlements
- Legislative Council of Singapore
- Parliament of Singapore
