= E. V. Davies =

Singaporean politician (1891–1963)

- Davies, c. 1951

Member of the City Council for North Ward (Note: Known as the Municipal Commission prior to 1951.)
- In office 7 December 1949 – November 1952
- Preceded by: Chong Thutt Pitt (PP)
- Succeeded by: A. R. Lazarous (SLP)
- Majority: 1949: 803 (59.5%)

Personal details
- Born: Edward Vethanayagam Davies; March or 5 April 1891 British Ceylon (present-day Sri Lanka)
- Died: 9 August 1963 (aged 71) Singapore General Hospital, State of Singapore (present-day Singapore)
- Party: Labour Party (1949–1953)
- Spouse: Checha Davies (m. 1925)
- Children: 2
- Occupation: Educator; politician

Edward Vethanayagam Davies (March or 5 April 1891 – 9 August 1963) was a Singaporean educator and politician who served on the Municipal Commission of Singapore and then on the City Council of Singapore.

Born in Ceylon, Davies came to Singapore in 1913 and was appointed the headmaster of the Rangoon Road School in 1935. He continued with the school, which later became the Rangon Road English School, until he stepped down in 1947. He became the local Chief Inspector of Schools in 1942 during the Japanese Occupation of Singapore.

Davies was elected to the Municipal Commission of Singapore in December 1949, representing the North Ward as a member of the Labour Party, being named the party's leader on the commission following the mid-1950 resignation of Pat Johnson. As a commissioner, he pushed for Singapore's achieving official city status, which was officially attained in 1951. He remained on the council when the commission was then replaced by the City Council of Singapore.

In mid-1952, Davies led a walkout of nine councillors, five of the Labour Party and four independents, in protest of an amendment introduced by Progressive Party leader A. P. Rajah which he felt would heavily favour that party. This led to the amendment being passed with just six votes, all from the Progressive Party. However, he had a falling out with the party's General Council when he was not fielded as a candidate in the 1952 City Council election.

== Early life and career ==
Davies was born in March or on 5 April 1891 in British Ceylon. He was the son of U. S. Davies and grew up with at least three brothers and four sisters; he and his family moved to British Malaya. He first began as a teacher at the Methodist Boys' School in Kuala Lumpur within the Federated Malay States in 1911. He came to Singapore in 1913 as a teacher with the Outram Road School, eventually rising to the post of senior master there. In April 1921, Davies was elected the honorary secretary of the Singapore Teachers' Association, and was elected its chairman in June 1935. In this capacity, he supported an experiment on the use of gramophones to teach English. He remained in that post until March 1937, when he was succeeded by Frank Caulfield James and was instead elected a vice-president.

On 3 June 1935, Davies was officially transferred to the Rangoon Road School as headmaster, reportedly becoming the first Asian headmaster of an English school in Singapore. A farewell was held at the residence of a master of the Outram Road School. During the event, a letter from headmaster Goodman Ambler, who was then on leave, was read out. In it, Ambler claimed that Davies "[possessed] the three great attributes of a successful and popular headmaster — ability, zeal and tact." During WWII, Singapore fell to and was occupied by the Japanese beginning on 15 February 1942. By August, Davies had been appointed the Chief Inspector of Schools in Syonan, as Singapore was then known. In November, a Teachers' Association was formed by the Japanese government with his support. Historian Harold E. Wilson wrote that this body "served as an instrument of control and indoctrination in the hands of authorities rather than as a means to represent the interests of the profession." Educator N. I. Low recalled that Davies was an "efficient [shock-absorber], receiving the Japanese shocks passing them on to us greatly reduced." On 15 February 1945, he was awarded a Certificate of Merit by the Mayor of Syonan-to, Naito Kanichi, for his administrative work as Chief Inspector.

Davies stepped down from Rangoon Road School in 1947, after which he turned his attention to adult education, becoming a committee member of the People's Education Association. In July 1948, he was teaching a class of 50 adults organised by the association. In this period, he was also the secretary and a manager to Indian Publishers Ltd., which published the Indian Chronicle, reportedly the second English-language Indian daily in Singapore, edited first by S. D. Luther and then by V. P. Abdullah.

== Politics ==
=== 1949 Election ===
In mid-October 1949, Davies joined the Labour Party (SLP), formed in 1948 to advocate for workers' rights by unionists, in particular M. A. Majid, P. M. Williams and M. P. D. Nair. It was the second political party active in Singapore at the time, after the Progressive Party (PP). He stated that his "sympathies had always been with labour", even before his becoming a member of the SLP. Davies later claimed that he had initially been invited to join the PP, but he turned them down, citing his experiences with those of the middle and lower classes as a teacher, instead turning to the SLP despite that party being financially "poor" in contrast.

S. M. A. H. Chisty, the December 1949 Labour Party candidate for the Rochore Ward.

Within days of Davies joining the party, the SLP announced four of the six candidates it had fielded to contest in the upcoming election for the Municipal Commission, to be held on 3 December; they were F. Bernard Oehlers, S. M. A. H. Chisty, Mak Pak Shee and S. S. Manyam. The last two candidates, as well as the Wards each candidate was to contest, were then still kept under wraps to "keep the Progressives guessing about their opponents". Of the four candidates revealed, only Chisty had previously stood for election. The PP had taken control of the commission in the previous election in April, winning 13 out of 18 seats, with the SLP winning just one. In December, six seats were up for grabs, one in each ward; of these seats, four were occupied by PP members, with the other two being occupied by independents, one of whom decided on running on the PP ticket. The PP attempted something similar with regard to keeping the electorate "in the dark", though all four of the party's commissioners whose term ended in December were expected to stand for re-election. Manyam was then disqualified, leaving just Oehlers, Chisty and Mak as the SLP's revealed candidates.

The SLP announced its full line-up for the election on 25 October; Davies was announced as one of the three remaining candidates, alongside M. P. D. Nair and V. K. Nair. He was to contest in the North Ward against incumbent Chong Thutt Pitt of the PP, a solicitor who was also the director of the Sze Hai Tong Bank and who had placed third in April, thus being elected on an eight-month term. Davies's candidacy was officially proposed by SLP president Francis Thomas and seconded by Victor J. Mendis, the party's campaign organiser for December. At his first election speech, as part of a rally held in Farrer Park, he advocated for increased self-governance and proclaimed it his "desire" to see that the middle and lower classes would "[get] the opportunities to improve themselves." At his final election speech, at an SLP rally held on 1 December again in Farrer Park, Davies stated that he wanted to avoid "empty promises" and "glamorous manifestos", instead stating: "Give me a chance and I will prove my worth."

The Singapore Free Press reported on 11 November that the SLP had hopes of Davies and M. P. D. Nair defeating PP incumbents Chong and Duncan Robertson, respectively. Mendis claimed in mid-November was confident of Davies's chances, noting that Pat Johnson, the SLP's only member on the Municipal Commission, had won the same ward, with its electorate largely comprising those in the working class, in April. He also felt that Davies's work as an educator was "well-known". The Straits Times reported at the end of the month that Davies's candidacy was generally considered by observers to be the SLP's "strongest bid" of the season.

Davies won the North Ward seat with 803 votes, a majority of 257 over Chong's 546. This was the SLP's most "clear cut victory" of the night, though only one other LP candidate won their seat; Chisty was elected in the Rochore Ward. M. P. D. Nair, V. K. Nair and Mak lost to PP incumbents while Oehlers lost to an independent. The Malaya Tribune reported that the supporters of both the SLP and the PP "appeared to be quite happy" with the outcome, with Thomas noting that both Davies and Chisty's seats were won by significant margins and that M. P. D. Nair had lost to Robertson by only a very narrow margin of 31 votes.

=== Municipal Commission (1949–1951) ===
==== Examinations Committee ====
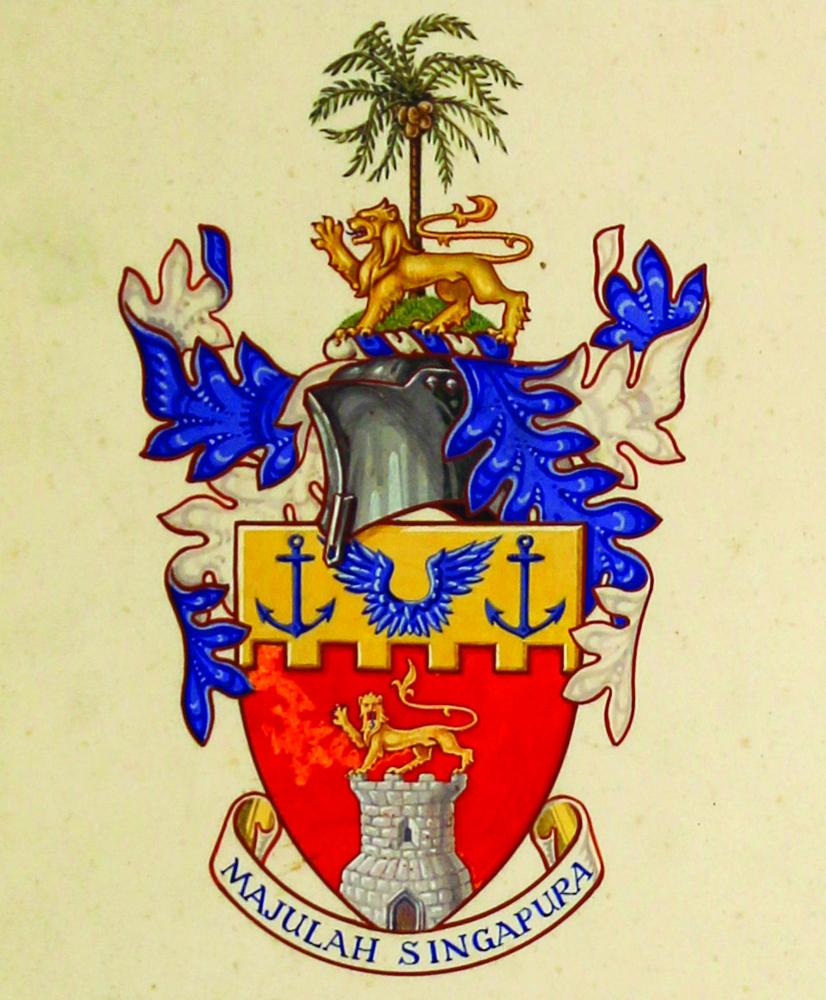
Coat of arms of the Municipal Commission

Davies and Chisty became the second and third SLP members on the Municipal Commission, joining Johnson, who was now to serve as the leader of the SLP on the commission. They were elected on terms ending in December 1952. Shorly taking office, Davies was placed on the commission's Examinations Committee. With the committee, he proposed altering the upcoming promotion examinations for municipal clerks, to be held in early January, due to the clerks having been informed of the examination on "short notice". He felt that it was unfair for these clerks, many of whom had been out of school for decades, to "take examinations in almost forgotten subjects" so soon, as well as for clerks whose work was more "mechanical" to be tested through essays and summaries. He additionally felt that the clerks, still reeling from the effects of the Japanese Occupation, would feel "overtaxed".

After failing to find support for his proposal among his fellow commissioners on the committee, he instead decided to initiate a motion at the monthly meeting of the Municipal Commission on 30 December. This meeting was, according to The Malaya Tribune, anticipated to be one of the "stormiest sessions" of the commission since the debate on the Pontian Tunnel scheme on 4 July; it was also to comprise a report on the scheme by the Pontian Tunnel Inquiry Committee and a debate on the definition of 'seniority' for employees of the municipality. He suggested that the written exam be replaced with an oral examination instead, accompanied by a report from the clerks' department heads. The motion was defeated, receiving eight votes for and 10 against; its opponents included teachers Frank Caulfield James and Phyllis Eu Cheng Li, both of the PP, and Raffles College Professor of Physics N. S. Alexander, all of whom favoured written examinations to their oral counterparts. The Singapore Free Press opined that the meeting, which ran for six hours without getting to the Pontian Tunnel report, was one of the commission's "longest and liveliest" of the year.

In March 1950, the Bulletin, the organ of the Singapore Municipal Services Union, which represented the clerks, reported that several of the commissioners who had voted against the motion had been swayed by PP commissioner A. P. Rajah's incorrect claim in a meeting that the union had support examination bars on clerks who were "of advanced age". In the same month, he was appointed to a Special Appeals Committee, alongside Alexander, Goh Hood Kiat and George Oehlers, which was to oversee the complaints of over 200 municipal employees on the change in their wages. At the end of July, he was appointed to a special committee to "reconsider" the definition of seniority "in service" and "in status" with regards to the Establishment Board's policy on promoting municipal employees, alongside Yap Pheng Geck, Sandy G. Pillay, C. F. J. Ess and J. V. West. The committee delivered a report in November which found that the board should have promoted based on the officers' suitability "irrespective of the grade or class of his existing appointment or status in the service." A majority of the commissioners voted in favour of this.

==== Resignation of Pat Johnson ====
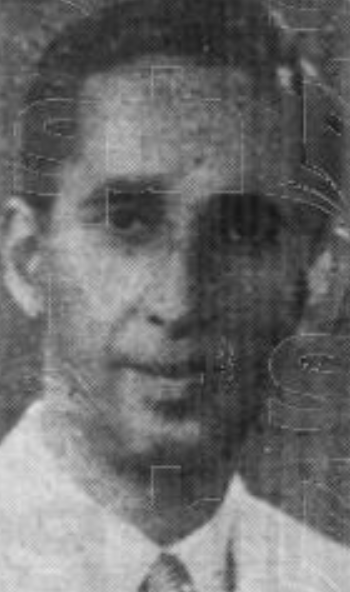
Pat Johnson, the first leader of the Labour Party on the Municipal Commission.

At the end of July, The Malaya Tribune reported that Davies and Chisty were set to vote against a motion by Johnson to reverse the commission's decision to introduce a $300 monthly allowance for commissioners. The official position of the SLP was in favour of this as it "[opened] the doors of politics to the working man." This was to be the SLP's first "showdown" with Johnson, who had previously walked out of the party's annual conference with Mendis and several members of his faction of the SLP following Lim Yew Hock's election as party president. He had since declared that he no longer wished to serve as the party's leader on the commission. "Fireworks" were expected between the three at the meeting.

At the Municipal Commission meeting on 31 July, Johnson initiated the motion, arguing that while he had initially supported the scheme, he had come to view accepting the money as "selling [their souls]", and that Municipal Commissioners should be "voluntary" workers. Only Eu spoke fully in support of his motion, with Johnson's associate Yap putting forth a modified proposal, though this was without a seconder and thus quickly failed. Ess accused Johnson of initiating this motion "simply because he had fallen out with the Labour Party", having claimed that he was "not prepared to support anything Labour." Ess noted that Johnson, who would usually sit in between Davies and Chisty, had instead chosen to sit with the three independents on the commission in that meeting.

In early August, Johnson and Mendis led a mass exodus of about 100 SLP members over what they claimed were differences in opinion over party policy, leaving just Davies and Chisty as the SLP's representatives on the commission, though Johnson was to continue on the commission as an "independent Labour commissioner". The SLP demanded at the end of the month that Johnson resign from the Municipal Commission as he had been elected as an SLP member. Davies was then appointed Johnson's successor as the SLP's leader on the Municipal Commission. After Johnson's resignation, the SLP began inviting both Davies and Chisty to meetings of the General Council to "keep the General Council in close contact with Municipal politics", as part of a broader effort to prepare for the upcoming Municipal Commission election, to be held in December.

==== SLP leader on the commission ====
At a meeting of the commission on 31 August, Davies introduced a motion in which he stated that, generally speaking, municipal officers should not continue to be employed permanently past retirement age, though if deemed necessary they could continue in a "supernumerary capacity on a temporary basis." He opined that this was unfair to other junior officers, and that doing away with this practice would save money. The motion was then amended by Ess, who cut the part of the motion which would have given it a "retrospective effect", and Johnson, who added a clause that this would not apply to department heads, who would be considered on a case-by-case basis. This amended motion was unanimously approved by the commissioners.

At the December 1950 Municipal Commission election, which had six seats previously occupied by those who had come second in April 1949 up for grabs, the SLP again contested all six wards, though only one candidate, M. P. D. Nair in the City Ward, won his seat, bringing the number of SLP members on the commission to three once more. The Malaya Tribune reported that this was considered a defeat for the SLP as several popular policies had formed key planks of the SLP platform. The PP did not contest in two of the seats, and with Nair's triumph over the PP's Chan Kum Chee, the party lost three seats, leaving just nine PP candidates on the commission. The Tribune noted that the "workers' case" would still be "fairly well represented" through the victories of Nair and Manyam, who had quit the SLP and run on the PP ticket in the North Ward, defeating the SLP's V. Rajaratnam.

The commission held its first meeting after the election on 6 December, during which Municipal Commission President T. P. F. McNeice announced the commissioners' appointment to committees. Davies was appointed to the Finance and General Purposes Committee, alongside Robertson, Rajah, Johnson, C. F. Smith and S. F. Ho, and the Establishments Committee, alongside Ess, Goh, P. T. Nathan and F. L. Lane. When McNeice released the list for approval, Davies quickly questioned the selection process for the committees, noting that he had not been consulted as the SLP leader on the commission for it while Ess, his PP counterpart, had been, though Chisty then claimed that this was because Davies "could not be found for consultation." Nair and Davies then called for allowing voters to register year-round as opposed to a six-week period. McNeice supported the proposal, considering it "most valuable."

In February 1951, Davies was appointed the SLP's representative on the five-member Civil Defence Committee of the commission which was to "exercise the extra-ordinary powers of their President in cases of emergency", alongside Ess, Goh and Oehlers, representing the PP, independent and nominated commissioners, respectively, as well as McNeice himself. This had been established as McNeice felt that he was "not prepared" to exercise those powers on his own. He suggested in May that the commission meet twice a month to help deal with its increasing workload. Davies was appointed to the Municipal Salaries Revision Committee, which was to draw up a set of rules regarding the "conduct and discipline" of Municipal employees, alongside Oehlers, Ess, Goh, J. G. Aspinall and D. E. Siddons, as well as L. R. F. Earl, who was appointed the chair. The rules were approved by the commission in August.

==== Flooding ====
At the meeting in late January 1951, Davies queried on floods in low-lying areas of the island, which had occurred earlier in the month, and how these were being dealt with, as well as on how this issue was considered in the planning and construction of both Singapore Improvement Trust and private flats, particularly those in low-lying districts such as in Kim Keat Road, Dorset Road and Pasir Panjang. He also called for a "list of actions taken" against developers who did not build above the flood levels as required by existing regulations. He again queried about the January floods in April, which led to the Municipal Engineer, G. Edmond, producing a report on the floods which was to suggest additional measures to be taken to ensure that the situation did not recur.

The report, published in July, recommended the formation of a joint Municipal and Government body to design a set of regulations for "flood alleviation of all canals is partly in the Municipal and partly in the Rural area of Singapore." The committee was formed under the Public Works Department as the "first coordinated effort to combat [flood allevation] under such a single department", with the commission nominating J. M. Jumabhoy, the Municipal President and the Municipal Engineer to that committee. The establishment of this committee reportedly "[ensured] a more focused and effective approach to reducing Singapore's flood risk."

==== Building ring investigation ====
Davies found in 1951 that local contractors believed there to be a "ring" which was "cornering the contract works of the Singapore Municipality". He had received reports that a select few contractors were "always invited to tender for jobs no matter how small the amounts are." The complainant contractors alleged that they had failed to receive invitations "in a manner above suspicion."

On looking through the annual reports on contractors, he felt that "too few" contractors were being invited for tenders. He questioned the process by which the municipality gave out tenders to contractors during the commission's April meeting and received answers that he felt were "evasive and unsatisfactory". Davies authored a memorandum on the issue in which he suggested inviting more contractors for tenders to "promote the keenest competition" for the contracts, and called for a review of contractors who had worked with the Municipality. He distributed the memorandum to the commissioners on the Building Committee and asked in May that they perform an inquiry on the issue; the committee began work on a report shortly after.

==== Self-governance ====
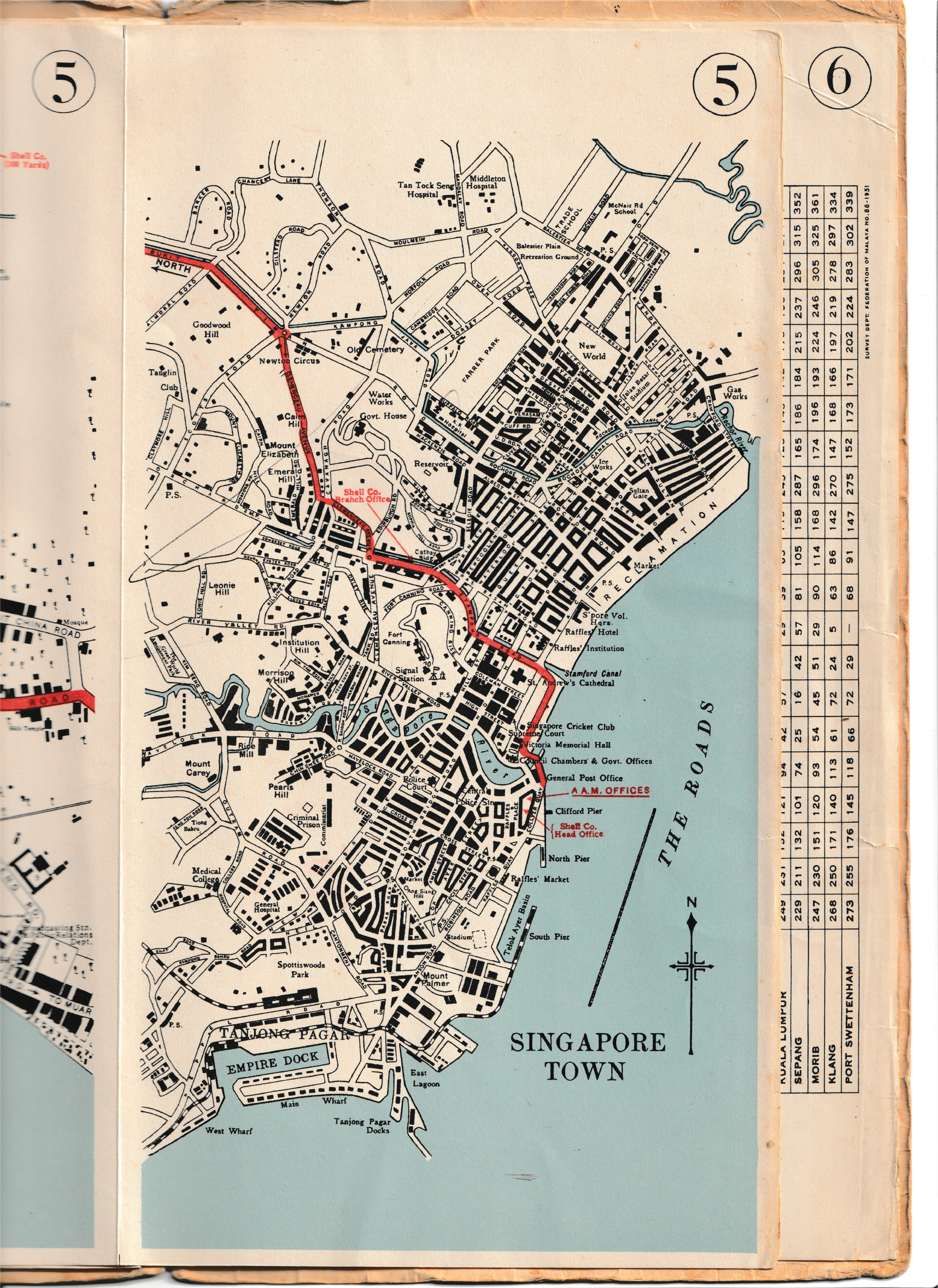
1951 map of the City of Singapore.

Davies was known to be a "prime mover" for Singapore receiving official city status as part of a wider push for increased self-governance, as was a key plank of the SLP platform. He generally felt that Singapore was progressing at too slow a pace, and that it was "not keeping in step with the 'blueprint' which Sir Stamford Raffles planned." According to The Singapore Free Press, Davies was responsible for first proposing a resolution which would officially grant city status to Singapore.

On 31 January, Davies initiated a motion calling for the eventual creation of a Mayor of Singapore office, opining that this would "go to the root of the Municipality's outmoded constitution", and that this would lead to a future motion calling for the removal of nominated members of the commission and having the commission be comprised fully of elected members, stating: "The little measure of progress meted out to us, the right to vote and elect some of our own legislators and commissioners, has given the public a great impetus. We now look forward to the day when we shall have this in full measure." However, he noted that the commissioners would only begin the process of creating the office once the report which was to "study the question of local government" had been delivered. The motion reportedly received "acclamation" from the rest of the commission and was passed unanimously.

King George VI approved Singapore's application for city status in July. Davies had then spent the past two weeks in the Singapore General Hospital, having fallen ill. On hearing the news, he stated that he was "very glad", though he "regretted that no member of the royal family could bestow the honour." He also noted that Singapore had "lagged behind" in several sectors, particularly in its politics and its economy, and noted that with the attainment of city status "we should try to bring Singapore up to what it should be." Singapore officially attained city status by a royal charter on 22 September. This was accompanied by a ceremony held at the Padang. Davies was released from hospital just days before after nearly three-and-a-half months spent there, though he had been asked by his doctors to stay at home and continue resting for another three weeks. He was reportedly unsuccessful in attempting to persuade his doctors to let him attend the ceremony, which was his "wish come true." They did, however, allow him to drive around the city to observe the decorations that had been put in place.

With Singapore's attaining of city status, the Municipal Commission of Singapore was renamed the City Council of Singapore, and the municipal commissioners were henceforth known as city councillors. Davies was to return to his seat on the commission, now the council, after the first City Council election on 1 December.

=== City Council (1951–1952) ===
The SLP performed well at the 1951 City Council Election, held on 1 December, winning three more seats and bringing the total number of SLP members on the council to six. P. R. Williams and the leaders of a "rebel" faction of the SLP, Lee Choon Eng and V. K. Nair, won in the Rochore, South and West wards, respectively. They each won over a PP candidate. Lee had defeated Ess in the "biggest upset" of the election. Officially, the number of PP candidates on the council dropped from nine to eight and the independents from six to four, though S. A. Mohamed Ali, who had been re-elected in 1950 as an independent, was a member of the PP and was generally considered a PP councillor. Davies questioned McNeice on the number of PP candidates on the council, though the latter admitted that he "could not give a very satisfactory answer" due to Mohamed Ali. With Ess's loss, Rajah, who won the North Ward in a "difficult fight" against the SLP's A. R. Lazarous and two independents, was elected the leader of the PP on the council, and Davies was to continue as the SLP leader.

Five of the six SLP members on the newly reconstituted City Council on 5 December. From left to right are: M. P. D. Nair, Lee Choon Eng, V. K. Nair, E. V. Davies and P. R. Williams.

At the first meeting of the council following the election, Davies was again appointed to the Financial and General Purposes and the Establishments Committees, alongside Rajah, Robertson, Ho, Jumabhoy, K. Jagatheesan and a to-be-determined nominated councillor in the former, and James, V. K. Nair and H. J. Rae in the latter. He was also appointed to the Singapore Improvement Trust. On 7 December, he announced that the SLP was to work towards nationalising Singapore's public transport system, including the Singapore Traction Company, starting first with the local bus companies. He wished to "stop the middle-man's profit and provide cheaper and better profit for the common people." He viewed this as a necessity given the city's population density. However, this declaration was met with some opposition from the SLP's own members, including Williams, who believed that this should be limited to services in the city, as anything beyond was not the responsibility of the council. The SLP's Executive Council then announced that it would wait for the release of the British government expert L. C. Hill's report on the matter before deciding the extent to which it should pursue the matter.

As the leaders of their respective parties on the council, Davies and Rajah met with and spoke to Oliver Lyttelton, 1st Viscount Chandos, the Secretary of State for the Colonies, on 10 December during his visit to Singapore. They requested for assistance from the British government on providing technical training in England for local youths. Davies also questioned him on the ambiguity of citizenship in Singapore, noting that the council did not have any "ordinance to define the qualifications of a citizen in Singapore" beyond being allowed to vote, though he "failed to get a satisfactory reply." In April, a special committee comprising just him and Robertson was formed to work through the details of a $500,000 scheme by McNeice to provide the technical training in order to help address the council's staff shortages, a problem which was "deteriorating all the time".

==== Finance and General Purposes Committee ====
McNeice announced on 21 December 1951 that the 3.75% fixed-interest $30,000,000 city loan, intended to finance the city's public services, would be closed at the end of the year due to a "lack of public response", with only $23,000,000 having been subscribed to. Noting that the vast majority of this came from the government and local banks, he described this as "most disappointing", believing that contributing to this was the "most practical way in which citizens could show their belief in themselves and in their future and the aim that Singapore City 'shall stand high in repute'", to which Davies agreed. McNeice stated that the city would have to raise funds "somehow or other locally." The Financial and General Purposes Committee was put in charge of making the $40,000,000 city loan for 1952 more "attractive" for the general public. The committee soon began considering introducing premium bonds and lotteries to help raise funds. Davies was initially unsure, choosing to defer judgement to the SLP's executive council. The executive council told the SLP's councillors to oppose both premium bonds and lotteries, in contrast with the PP, which allowed its councillors to "vote freely" on the matter.

On 30 March 1952, the president of the Singapore Federation of City Council Labour Union, comprising nine unions representing 8,000 municipal employees in total, issued a two-week ultimatum seeking better pay, allowances and working conditions. This expired on 14 April, and it was announced that union members would vote on whether to go on strike over two meetings, one on 20 April and the other on 27 April. The Finance and General Purposes Committee then set up a sub-committee comprising Davies, Rajah, Jumabhoy and Rae, who was then the council's Deputy President, to deal with the strike threat and look into the union's outstanding demands. McNeice then claimed that some parts of the ultimatum, particularly those regarding working conditions, had already been met, and that the rest would be "actively pursued". At the same time, the Government and Municipal Labour Union, representing 2,000 workers, separately announced that it would vote on delivering a three-week ultimatum to the local government and the City Council.

The committee met with representatives of both unions in separate meetings on 20 April. The committee had hoped to discuss with the representatives together in one meeting, and the representative of the Government and Municipal Labour Union, R. K. Palaiyan, agreed to such a meeting, though the representatives of the Singapore Federation of City Council Labour Union refused this as they did not wish for Palaiyan to be present. It was reported the day after that the negotiations had gone well and that the threatened strikes would now "probably not take place." The Singapore Federation of City Council Labour Union had initially called for a second meeting, though they eventually withdrew this request as they were "satisfied that matters were now sufficiently in hand".

==== Expulsion of M. P. D. Nair ====
On 1 March 1952, the General Council voted at a meeting to expel M. P. D. Nair from the SLP after it was found that he had sent a letter to H. S. Lee, the leader of the Malayan Chinese Association (MCA) in Selangor, on the recent victories of the MCA-UMNO alliance. SLP general secretary P. M. Williams stated that the General Council held the alliance to be a "coalition of capitalistic and feudalistic interests aimed at the destruction of the working class", and thus claimed that Nair's actions were a "betrayal" of the SLP's principles. The expulsion was expected to lead to another "split" in the party, with his supporters in the South Ward organising a petition to party president Lim Yew Hock in which they were to question him on why Nair had been expelled, though Lim had not been present at the meeting on 1 March. Davies then opined that the "outdated" General Council "could not have done anything worse to disintegrate the party" and proclaimed that they should be expelled instead.

Days after this, Davies voiced his support for the National Service Bill, whereby men aged 18 to 66 would be "liable to be called up for national service", finding that this would "put to a test the intentions of many who regard Singapore as their home." C. R. Dasaratha Raj, one of two SLP members on the Legislative Council, alongside Lim, agreed, finding the institution of national service to be "long overdue". It was then noted in The Straits Times that Davies and Dasaratha Raj's views on the matter differed from that of the more "extremist" Williams, who wished to see the bill rejected as he was against national service imposed by "a foreign government." This "split" was likened to that between Clement Attlee and Aneurin Bevan on rearmament. The SLP voted on a resolution opposing the bill, and it was then reported that Dasaratha Raj and Davies could "disregard party policy only at the risk of expulsion."

In early April, Nair told The Singapore Free Press that he still considered himself an SLP councillor, noting that he had not personally been told by a party leader that he had been expelled, despite the SLP having announced to the local press that he had been kicked out of the party. Davies agreed and noted that Nair continued to consult him and follow his lead on the council. Nair's expulsion was then confirmed by the General Council of the SLP days later, and he continued on the council as an independent.

==== Fully-elected council and walkout ====
Davies told The Straits Times on 23 June 1952 that he would push for a fully-elected City Council at the next council meeting, noting that only 18 out of the 27 seats were elected, though such a shift would have to take place after December as he did not feel that it would be possible to institute this before the upcoming election held then. He claimed to have discussed this with both Lyttleton and Lyttleton's predecessor Jim Griffiths on their visits to Singapore. He felt that the Government would not be "sincere in its promises" if it opposed this and that Singapore would be "stagnant or deteriorating" if this was not instituted soon. The PP were expected to oppose this as they were to separately propose the election of a mayor along with six aldermen, in place of the nominated councillors. It was also anticipated that his proposal would face some opposition from councillors who felt that Hill's recommendations regarding increasing the number of electoral wards from six to nine be dealt with first before moving for a fully-elected council.

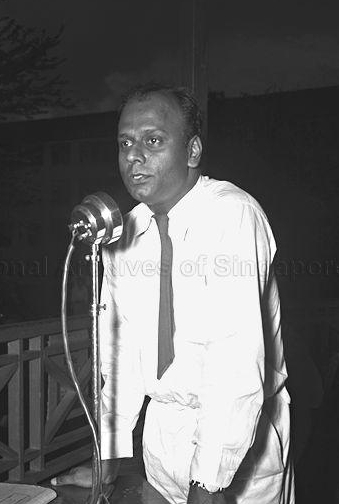
A. P. Rajah, who became the leader of the Progressive Party on the City Council in December 1951.

At the meeting, Davies proclaimed that Singapore was a "political backwater" that "[didn't] even move at a snail's pace", and that he wished for the councillors to "get going instead of waiting for Government's pleasure". On his conversations on the matter with Griffiths and Lyttleton, he came to view it as a "case of throwing water on duck's back." Davies's motion initially "survived" several attempts by nominated councillors to "send it to a committee for detailed study and recommendations". However, Rajah then put forth the amendment for the election of a mayor and the selection of six aldermen from those who had served on the council for three years, justifying this by stating that this would allow for a "pool of experienced councillors who could be called to serve the city."

Rajah's amendment faced heavy opposition from Davies and the rest of the Labour councillors, as well as several independents, who felt that this plan would heavily favour the PP. Davies attempted numerous times to have the amendment invalidated, stating that this was as a "new motion" instead of an amendment, though this was rejected by McNeice each time. In response, Davies led a nine-member councillor walkout, being followed by P. R. Williams, M. P. D. Nair, V. K. Nair, Lee, Chisty and Manyam (now an independent), as well as independents Jumabhoy and H. A. Jivabhai. Rajah then continued to move the amendment, which passed with just six PP votes; the remaining nominated councillors, as well as Mohamed Ali, the sole remaining independent, abstained. Chisty, Jumabhoy and Jivabhai went home while the rest, including Davies, returned after the vote in time for adjournment speeches. Robertson opined that the walkout was "irresponsible." Typically, the amendment would have "become the substantive motion", but Rajah did not wish to continue with this and instead had the amendment referred to a committee which was to look into the recommendations of Hill's report.

V. K. Nair later stated that McNeice had shown a "partial" attitude to Davies's original resolution and that it was this that they had, on the suggestion of P. M. Williams, gone through with the walkout. Williams then claimed that the PP "capitalists" and the "bureaucratic" nominated councillors had "[formed] an unholy alliance to defeat democracy." Nair suggested that he hoped to move a vote of no confidence in McNeice as president for this. In responding to a statement published in The Straits Times that the SLP would bring the matter up to the Governor, Davies then clarified that he viewed the dispute and ensuing walkout as a "domestic matter" and thought that they "should not worry the Governor about it". Instead, he would consult with SLP leadership and with the independents who participated in the walkout to decide on further action. Davies then proclaimed that he would again attempt to move his resolution, and that it was "neither rejected nor passed in an amended form and [was], therefore, still beyond the House."

The councillors who walked out received criticism for having done so despite being "paid servants of the City". Davies felt that it was "preposterous" to regard the councillors as "paid servants", noting that the councillors received an allowance, not a salary. The Indian Daily Mail also strongly criticised the walkout, having expected the SLP to "move heaven and earth to get their resolution passed." Instead, they enacted a "cowardly retreat" and wrote that, given that Rajah's amendment had only passed with six votes, if all nine councillors had remained and participated in the vote, they might have been able to reject the amendment. It was also pointed out that the SLP could simply have withdrawn their original resolution before walking out. The paper also heavily criticised Davies's characterisation of the dispute as a purely "domestic" matter, and noted that members of the SLP were hesitant to "follow up" on the walkout with "vigorous action." The Daily Mail concluded that "in avoiding one trouble, they [had] merely invited hundreds on their worried heads!"

==== 1952 City Council election ====
SLP treasurer A. R. Lazarous, who was fielded in the North Ward.

With Davies's term set to end in December, he applied to run for re-election on the SLP ticket in the North Ward in the upcoming election, to be held on 6 December. There were seven other members of the SLP who had applied to run on the ticket across five of the six wards; one, SLP treasurer Lazarous, had also applied for the ticket in the North Ward. Chisty had done the same for the Rochore Ward. At the council meeting on 9 August, it was announced that the General Council had selected Lazarous as the SLP's candidate for the North Ward over Davies. This was opposed by a "dissentient" group of the SLP, 2,000 members strong, who also opposed the selection of P. M. Williams over union leader S. Jaganathan to contest in the South Ward and the selection of SLP secretary D. Stevens over Chisty to contest in the Rochore Ward. This group felt that the General Council had been "prejudiced" in choosing to field Lazarous and Williams and threatened a "mass resignation", calling for an emergency meeting on the matter.

With Lazarous's selection, Davies received several letters, calls and enquiries questioning why he would not be running for re-election. He stated that he had not been informed why Lazarous had been chosen over him, and claimed instead that the General Council was ruled by a 'clique' which "lacked the confidence of the electorate". He revealed that the SLP allowed non-British subjects as members, and alleged that the annual conference, through which the council had been elected earlier in the year and at which Johnson and Mendis had staged the walkout, was a "farce" that had been staged in part through bringing a "few lorry loads" of non-local members to vote for preferred candidates through a "stupid" constitution. He accused this General Council of attempting to control its members on the Legislative and City Councils and of making "fantastic pronouncements" for the SLP as a whole. He claimed to have not been aware of any action taken by the General Council which proved beneficial to the party, and felt that they were simply selecting those within their own faction as candidates. The selection of candidates was also criticised by M. P. D. Nair and V. K. Nair, the latter of whom opining that both Chisty and Davies had "established themselves in their position" and who had "discharged their duties as councillors satisfactorily."

Stevens then told The Singapore Free Press on 19 August that there was no such 'clique' on the General Council, which he claimed was "trying to manage party affairs in a just way." This was followed the day after by an official statement by the SLP denouncing Davies's accusations as "grossly unfounded", claiming that Davies had not raised any objection to the constitution despite being present at the annual conference and that it seemed that he was willing to forego all of these criticisms hoping to be nominated the SLP's candidate for the North Ward. The statement in turn accused him of being "clearly unprincipled in his behaviour" despite being a leading member of the party. It was then explained that the General Council had voted for Lazarous over Davies eight to three as they felt that the latter's "frail" health could not "withstand the strain of elections". Additionally, the General Council attributed Lazarous's loss in 1951 to the "lack of care and attention" Davies provided to his ward. The Indian Daily Mail also questioned why Davies had ostensibly held on to this information for so long, though it was "thankful" for his revealing that the party accepted non-subjects as members and hoped that he had come out of this a "wiser man". In response to this, he claimed that he had attempted to "effect the necessary changes from within, without resorting to public information", to no avail.

A nine-member committee to represent 2,275 members of the SLP who disputed the candidate list was established. It submitted a memorandum to Lim Yew Hock on 20 August, stating that it "[could not] recognise the present Council as a valid body, nor can we accept decisions when it has so openly flouted the constitution, which it was elected to safeguard and honour". It stated that outgoing SLP councillors, such as Davies and Chisty, should generally be given "first right" to run for re-election. The committee gave Lim two weeks to organise a general meeting to "straighten out matters". Lim agreed to hold a meeting on 31 October, while the General Council worked to expel Lim. The Council was successful in this, and this led to another major split from the party, in addition to reportedly "[convincing] the public of the utter hideousness" of the SLP. In November, Davies spoke at an election rally for Jaganathan, who had decided to contest against Williams in the South Ward as an independent. He called the SLP a "haunted house in which evil spirits and evil influences prevail" and felt that Jaganathan was far more suited as a candidate than Williams.

In his adjournment speech for the final meeting of the City Council before the election, Davies lamented the fact that there still had not been a single local who had been appointed a municipal head of department. At the election, the SLP performed poorly. The SLP ultimately fielded candidates in only four wards, and of these only the North Ward was won by Lazarous. Jaganathan had won over Williams, and Stevens, who contested in the Rochore Ward against a now-independent Chisty and the PP's Sim Beng Seng, lost to the latter. When Lim's successor, S. K. Reddi, resigned in July 1953, the party struggled to find someone willing to take on the role of chairman. It was hoped that either Thomas or Davies, considered the "labour elders" and both then overseas, would consider taking up the post on returning to Singapore.

=== Other activities ===
In November 1950, Davies was appointed to the newly established Age of Retirement Committee, led by local Commissioner for Labour G. W. Davis, which had been formed by the government to "examine the general aspect of retirement at the age of 55" for civil servants. He was the oldest member of the committee. The committee finally delivered a report on 9 January 1953 recommending that the maximum age of retirement be raised to 60 with the recent increases in life expectancy, and that civil servants should be required to undergo a medical examination at age 55; this was to determine if they should be allowed to continue in the civil service until they hit 60. However, they also recommended allowing civil servants to retire at 45 if they so wished, as opposed to 50, which was then the minimum.

==== Benham committee ====
In December 1952, Davies and Oehlers were appointed to a committee chaired by F. C. Benham, the Economic Adviser, formed by Colonial Secretary W. L. Blythe to investigate the salaries of government employees. The committee met with the Singapore Federation of Unions of Government Employees on 9 December and the negotiations proved successful. The month after, the union held several meetings with the committee over their complaint that the employees of a lower class could not afford the "minimum diet given to Bushey Park destitutes." They asked that the workers be paid a family allowance, with their representative K. M. Byrne making the case for this.

The committee then drew up a series of recommendations for various family allowances to be paid to government employees, stating in their report published in March that they "deplored" the "tendency of Government workers since the war to expect a packet of backpay every two years or so and to get into debt in the interval." However, the committee's recommendations were expect to at $50,000,000 to the Federal budget and cost Singapore between $5,000,000 and $6,000,000, and so the government completely rejected the request for family allowance and instead form a separate commission to look into the salaries of government employees in Malaya. The Sunday Times opined that "seldom has the time of busy men been wasted so needlessly" as that of Benham, Oehlers and Davies, believing that the government should have made it clear from the beginning "exactly what they want their committees to decide."

== Personal life and death ==
On arriving in Singapore, Davies also soon joined the Indian Christian Association and the local Ceylon-Tamils' Association. He also became a member of the local branch of the YMCA, being appointed to the committee of its newly formed Literary and Social Union in May 1915. He became a founding member of the Singapore Indian Association in 1923 and was elected its honorary secretary in February 1924. A Rotarian, he was elected the honorary secretary of the club's Singapore branch in April 1937, succeeding Richard Eric Holttum. He served in that position for six years until the fall of Singapore. He was elected a director of the club in May 1948. In March 1950, Davies was elected to the committee of the Government Pensioners' Association.

Davies married fellow educator Checha George, who would go on to be a prominent social worker, clubwoman and women's rights activist, in Madras, Tamil Nadu, on 3 April 1925. Checha was the classmate of Davies's sibling; on her brothers' visit to India, her friend arranged her's and Davies's wedding. She then found him "tall and dashing". The couple had two daughters, violinist Susheela Devi and educator Shanta, who would go on to head the Dental Nurses Training School in Penang, and who would marry Chellie Sundram, the Regional Director (dental) of the World Health Organization. The couple also had an adopted son, Mohan. In his younger years, he played cricket, tennis and golf. Davies officially retired in 1955 and spent the rest of his life a pensioner. He died in the Singapore General Hospital on 10 August 1963.
