= Victor J. Mendis =

Ceylonese lawyer and politician (1894–1955)

- Mendis, c. 1948

Personal details
- Born: Victor Jerome Mendis; 1894 Moratuwa, British Ceylon (present-day Sri Lanka)
- Died: 15 May 1955 (aged 60–61) Colombo, British Ceylon
- Party: Labour Front (1954–1955); Labour Party (1948–1950; 1954)
- Children: 2
- Occupation: Lawyer; politician
- Nickname: "Pop" Mendis

Victor Jerome Mendis (1894 – 15 May 1955), also known as "Pop" Mendis, was a Ceylonese lawyer and politician active in Singapore. Mendis first came to Malaya in the mid-1920s, practising law in Penang. He and his legal partner at the time moved their practice to Singapore in 1932, where he settled. There, he served as the founding president of the Ceylonese Association of Singapore.

Mendis began his political career in 1948 as a founder of the Singapore Labour Party, quickly rising to a prominent position within the party early on in its history and becoming a figurehead of an early faction of the party alongside his then legal partner Pat Johnson. The pair quit the party in 1950 at its annual conference with about a hundred other members over a dispute regarding the means by which party officials were elected, among other aspects of party policy.

He rejoined the party in 1954 as its organising secretary and soon became one of two Labour Party leaders appointed to the three-member governing Executive Committee of the Labour Front on its formation through the merger of the Labour Party and the Singapore Socialist Party. When the Labour Party withdrew from the Front, Mendis remained with the latter and was expelled from the former. He organised the Front's campaign in the 1955 Singaporean general election. The party came into power with the election, with Mendis being credited in part for its victory, and he had a significant role in organising the incoming government, though he died just a month after the election.

== Early life and education ==
Mendis was born in the municipality of Moratuwa in British Ceylon in 1894. He was the son of Frederick Mendis, a Ceylonese planter. He grew up with about half a dozen siblings. He received his education and qualified as an advocate in Ceylon. In 1913, Mendis was admitted to The Honourable Society of Lincoln's Inn in London, through which he was called to the English Bar in 1916.

== Career ==
=== Legal career ===
After he was called to the Bar, he returned to Ceylon, where he practised for some time. There, he was a "contemporary of such well-known legal luminaries" as Herbert Victor Perera, Herbert Sri Nissanka and N. E. Weerasooria.

In March 1925, Mendis arrived in Penang within the Straits Settlements to take over the legal practice of T. Isaac Tambyah. However, as he had yet to be called to the local Bar, H. Ramsay Wilson was to continue with the firm for the time being. Mendis was reportedly "well-known and popular" in Penang and his practice grew "rapidly". He quickly "made a name for himself" as a criminal lawyer. By February 1926, he partnered with lawyer Ong Huck Lim to form Mendis & Huck Lim. Barrister-at-law and Advocate Brumoon Crayin Ahlip, a Ceylon Malay, joined the partnership at the end of 1929 and by October 1931 the firm had become Mendis & Ahlip. The year after, the pair decided to move their practice to Singapore. Ahlip went there first, re-establishing the practice at the start of August, and Mendis followed in the middle of the month. The business in Penang was taken over by P. Somasundram. Pat Johnson later joined the firm. Mendis wound up his legal practice in Singapore in the middle of 1952 due to "ill health", though he continued to provide legal advice free of charge. He revived his practice by 1954. Mercy Rajah became a partner in this period.

=== Social work ===
In 1917, shortly after returning to Ceylon, he was asked by the Social Service League to oversee the work of a group of social workers who would "[clean] up slums" in Colombo on Sundays. After this, he was put in charge of forming the Prisoners' Aid Society of Ceylon in 1920. On the weekends, he would visit prisoners in Colombo on the weekends; his work with them included helping them find employment on their release.

In May 1947, Mendis was elected the president of the newly founded Ceylonese Association of Singapore, which was to "look after the welfare of the Ceylonese of Singapore, particularly in political, social, economic and national matters." It was also to serve as a "liaison" between the local Ceylonese community and the local government, as well as the government of Ceylon. In this capacity, he was an advocate for the improvement of the working conditions of the thousands of Ceylonese troops stationed across Malaya to help in the region's restoration after World War II, aiding and working with them directly. By September, he had secured a plot of land from the government with the intent of erecting a clubhouse for the association. Mendis was also responsible for the formation of the Attap Dwellers' Association, a grassroots organisation which represented those who lived in Attap dwellings across Singapore. During the major floods in late 1954, Mendis aided in the evacuation of those who were stranded in Potong Pasir.

Mendis was appointed an honorary advisor to the Food Ministry of Ceylon by Premier Dudley Senanayake to advise on Siam's food situation. In the same year, Mendis submitted a plan for a vegetable, pig and poultry farm to the Land Office. The project was to add to the country's food supply. To be located in Sembawang, the 30-acre farm was to rear "as many pigs as possible" and 15,000 fowls. The poultry farm was to occupy eight acres. Five acres were to be devoted to the growing of vegetables "on scientific lines." Fruit trees were to be planted on the rest of the compound, which was to be surrounded by an exercise track for horses, accompanied by "spelling and exercising facilities", as well as paddocks and stables, for racehorses, as there was then no place on the island for the resting of racehorses when they were "off colour". He hoped to expand the farm if it was successful. The farm, erected in Nee Soon, was completed in the second half of 1952. In July of that year, he returned to Ceylon to continue as the honorary advisor to the Food Ministry there.

=== Labour Party ===
==== 1949 elections ====
Mendis was reportedly a founding member of the Singapore Labour Party (SLP), formed in November 1948 to advocate for workers' rights and actively push for self-governance, by unionists, in particular M. A. Majid, P. M. Williams and M. P. D. Nair, as the second political party in Singapore active in Singapore at the time, after the relatively pro-British Progressive Party (PP), which in contrast advocated for gradual reforms that would eventually lead to self-governance. He did not stand in either of the Municipal Commission of Singapore elections in 1949, though he spoke at the party's campaign rallies for both April and December, which were the first two Municipal Commission elections since 1911. He served as the party's election campaign organiser in the latter cycle, a post which made him one of the SLP's "top leaders". In that capacity, he claimed in November to have expected SLP candidates M. P. D. Nair, Mak Pak Shee and E. V. Davies to win a majority of the votes, though he was less certain on V. K. Nair, F. Bernard Oehlers and S. M. A. H. Chisty's chances. He had been the seconder for Davies, who was contesting in the North Ward.

In response to SLP leader S. S. Manyam's comment that the Progressive Party's (PP) management was "capitalistic", M. P. D. Nair's PP opponent in the South Ward, incumbent Duncan Robertson who was seeking re-election after having been elected to the commission on a seven-month term in April, pointed out that Mendis had "now [decided] it [would] suit his political ambitions" to "adopt trade union ideals" despite not having been a unionist himself. Manyam then noted that Mendis had neither considered himself a unionist nor "deserted the workers for capitalist principles", and that Mendis, while a "sympathiser of Labour", had not actually stood as a candidate in the elections, as he noted Robertson and "several other Capitalists" of the PP were. Robertson then clarified that he had accused Mendis of "adopting, not claiming trade union ideals and labour sympathies for the furtherance of his political ambitions", and noted that while Mendis was not standing as a candidate, he held a "major" post in the SLP, and that his influence "[carried] major weight" in the party. Mendis himself responded to Robertson, pointing to his social work in Ceylon and his work with the Ceylonese troops in Malaya as President of the Ceylon Association of Singapore as the reasoning behind his "labour sympathies". He then proclaimed that he had no intentions of ever standing as a candidate, accusing Robertson of "attempting to mislead the electorate of his Ward."

In the week before the election, Mendis predicted that the ruling PP would have a "great fall" and "meet their Waterloo on Saturday." However, all but two of the SLP candidates, Davies and Chisty, failed to secure a majority in their wards, with three of the four unsuccessful SLP candidates, including M. P. D. Nair, losing to a PP candidate. The Malaya Tribune reported that the supporters of both the SLP and the PP "appeared to be quite happy" with the outcome, with Francis Thomas, then the SLP president, noting that both Davies and Chisty's seats were won by large margins and that M. P. D. Nair had lost to Robertson by only a very narrow margin of 31 votes. Davies and Chisty became the second and third SLP members on the Municipal Commission, joining Mendis's colleague Pat Johnson of the North Ward, a founding member of the SLP who had been elected in April as the first SLP member on the commission for a term ending in December 1951.

==== Resignation ====
In early 1950, Thomas stepped down as SLP president and went on leave to England. At a party conference in June, Mendis, Majid, V. K. Nair, Johnson and Lim Yew Hock, a unionist and former PP member who joined the SLP in mid-1949, were nominated for election as president. However, Mendis, Nair and Johnson refused to stand for election and Majid withdrew his nomination at the last moment, leaving Lim to be elected president of the SLP unopposed. When Johnson was nominated for election as a vice-president, he walked out of the conference, proclaiming that he "[refused] to stand for any office at all in the Labour Party." He was followed by a crowd which included several prominent members of the party, including Mendis and Mak, and M. P. D. Nair, V. K. Nair and G. Sarangapani were elected the vice-presidents after. Williams was then elected the secretary-general of the party.

Johnson accused the conference proceedings of being "stage-managed" and stated that his confidence in the SLP had been "shaken", choosing to continue as a regular member of the party. He further proclaimed that he would not take any "mandate from a Nominated Unofficial Councillor." According historian Yeo Kim Wah, who cited Williams's account of the event, the "lawyer-group", an early faction of the highly factionalised SLP led by Johnson and Mendis, had hatched a scheme to elect Mendis as President of the SLP. However, they were countered by Lim and Williams's supporters, the two opposing factions having "joined forces" at the conference, and Lim having "packed" the conference with non-citizen labourers who he had "brought into the party to enable him to capture the party leadership."

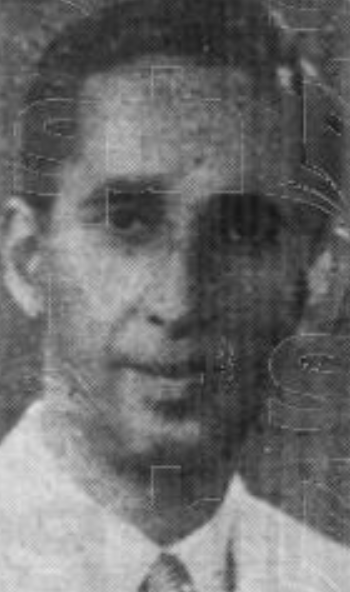
Pat Johnson, with whom Mendis led a mass exodus of SLP members.

On 2 August, Johnson and Mendis officially resigned from the SLP over "differences of opinion about recent Party policies." These included the way SLP officeholders were elected and the party's official support for the 1950 Rediffusion strike, the first trade union strike in Singapore. A mass exodus of party members ensued; by 4 August, the total number of SLP members who had resigned that month had risen to 100. Mak was among those who followed Johnson and Mendis. Over 100 members of the SLP's Kampong Amber Branch were then expected to follow suit. The resignees were expected to soon form their own political party, also of a "socialist nature." Williams accused Johnson and Mendis of having resigned for personal reasons as opposed to differing views on policy, disputing Johnson's assertions regarding the conference as "absolutely groundless." In an official statement on the resignations, the SLP quoted British Prime Minister Clement Attlee: "There is in fact no split but the shedding of a few leaves from the top of the tree, with a few parasitic appendages."

The resignations of Mendis and Mak, as well as 100 other former members, were officially approved on 25 August, while Johnson was suspended as he refused to heed the SLP's request that he step down from the Municipal Commission for having resigned from the SLP despite habing been elected as member of the party. According to Yeo, the events of the conference "marked the decline" of Johnson's faction as a whole.

In the Municipal Commission election held in December, Mendis guided war hero Elizabeth Choy, who was running as an independent in the West Ward. Mendis, at the time still with the SLP, had convinced her to enter politics on her return from London, as he believed that Singapore "needed more educated women like [herself] in politics." He believed that, with her experience, she could "help to promote the political growth of Singapore." Though he had then asked her to run as an SLP candidate, she was largely unfamiliar with the party, having only just returned to Singapore after several years spent overseas, and ultimately chose to run as an independent instead. PP leader C. C. Tan proclaimed at an election rally that voting for Choy would "in fact be voting for the Labour Party's Mr. V. J. Mendis". Choy came in second, behind the PP's Soh Ghee Soon and ahead of the SLP's Yap Chin Poh. Overall, only one SLP candidate, M. P. D. Nair, was elected, with three seats going to the PP and another two to independents.

The anticipated third party led by Johnson and Mendis never materialised; Mendis embarked on a years-long hiatus from politics after the 1950 election and Johnson retired from politics on the cessation of his term on the Municipal Commission, choosing not to follow through on his previously announced plans to contest in the 1951 Legislative Council Election and to not take up the SLP's offer to let him have the North Ward of the Municipal Commission if he chose to contest on the SLP ticket. Tensions between the factions of the party led by Williams and Lim would continue to grow, with the latter officially declaring his opposition to the former in August 1952. Lim had allied himself with Thomas, who had returned to Singapore and to the SLP. An SLP member who disapproved of Lim's leadership then noted that this was in spite of how Williams had aided Lim's bid for SLP President by "ousting" Williams and Mendis. The clashes between the factions eventually culminated in Lim's expulsion, an attempt to oust Williams and Thomas's final departure from the SLP; all this infighting severely weakened the SLP.

=== Labour Front ===
On 1 May 1954, the Singapore Socialist Party (SSP), a rival to the SLP, was officially founded by former members of the latter who had resigned or been expelled, including Thomas, Lim Yew Hock and S. Jaganathan. Shortly before the party's inauguration, the SLP invited Thomas to negotiate a merger between the two parties, though Thomas turned this down as he had "no time." This was part of an effort by the SLP to regain some of its former members, such as Nair and Mendis; V. P. Abdullah, a prominent figure in Williams's faction of the SLP who had been elected the party's president at the end of 1953, had invited all former members of the party to rejoin after making several amendments to the SLP's constitution in an attempt to revitalise the party, which was in a "parlous condition" having lost nearly all of its members who were "of repute". Following the rejection of the SLP's offer, Abdullah accused the SSP of being "neither Socialists nor democrats" and attempting to capitalise on the "goodwill" of the working class towards the local labour movement. He felt that the new party had "failed to explain to the public the reasons for forming such a party when the Colony has a fully grown socialist party."

C. H. Koh and Mendis as the Singapore Labour Party's representatives on the governing committee of the Labour Front in 1954.

In late July, Mendis, who had rejoined the SLP, was appointed the organising secretary alongside C. H. Koh, another prominent lawyer, as the general secretary; the pair were to succeed secretary E. S. Moorthy who had resigned due to the "pressure of work." The SSP then announced that it sought to form a "United Front" against the Progressive Party in the upcoming Legislative Assembly elections by allying with "all leftist political bodies and individuals in Singapore", including in particular the SLP. An alliance was preferred to a merger, though an "ultimate merger" was not out of the question. Despite the SLP's previous stance on the SSP, the former party announced that it would be merging with the SSP to form the Labour Front (LF) on 21 August. Three delegates from each party were placed on a committee with "over-all powers"; this comprised Mendis, Abdullah and Koh of the SLP and Thomas, Jaganathan and Lim Yew Hock of the SSP. It was decided that both the SLP and SSP would cease their independent activities and be merged completely by 1 July of the following year and all six members of the committee pledged not to stand as candidates in 1955 to ensure "absolute impartiality" in this process. As a founder of the LF, Mendis roped in several individuals who would go on to hold leading positions in the party, such as J. M. Jumabhoy, who had served as an indendent on the Municipal Commission and then on the City Council, and, according to Jumabhoy, David Marshall, a lawyer formerly with the PP who was also a founder of the SSP. On the party's formation, Mendis was also appointed to a legal sub-committee, alongside Koh, Marshall and R. C. H. Lim.

It was then decided that the newly formed party was to be governed by a three-member committee, to be known as the Labour Front Executive Committee; Mendis, Koh and Thomas were elected to this committee, while Marshall was asked by Lim Yew Hock to serve as the leader of the party. Thomas described this committee as a "troika" which was to "stand above the political fray, giving impartial guidance to the party." In addition to not contesting the 1955 elections, the trio agreed not to accept any ministerial post. However, the three leaders often "could not agree between themselves." They then tasked Marshall with drafting up a constitution for the LF with the intention of officially registering as a political party. The governing committee signed off on and published the party's manifesto in September, proclaiming that it would seek to "safeguard basic and economic and social rights", repeal the Emergency Regulations and advocate for a "self-governing United Malaya" and for "complete and rapid Malayanisation of the Public Services". Mendis was posthumously described as having been the "driving force" of this committee by Aster Gunasekera of The Singapore Standard, who likened his influence within the party to that of the fictional character Svengali in Trilby. Jumabhoy considered him a "father figure" to the party and a "king-maker" who was viewed as impartial as he appeared to lack ulterior motives and never had any plans to run for elective office or serve on the Legislative Assembly.

==== SLP withdrawal ====
As a member of the Executive Committee, Mendis was involved in selecting the LF's candidates for the 1955 Singaporean general election. In this capacity, he and Lim Choon Eng advocated for Marshall to be placed in the Cairnhill Constituency, where C. C. Tan, who had remained the leader of the PP, was expected to contest; they felt that Tan would be "sent scurrying back to Tanglin constituency." On the other hand, Lim Yew Hock feared that the party might lose "a good man" and instead advocated for Marshall to contest the Stamford Constituency against Nazir Ahmad Mallal. Marshall was ultimately adamant in taking on C. C. Tan, whom he had come to view as the "epitome of servility to colonial interests." Soon, it emerged that Thomas found it "very difficult" to work with Mendis and Koh, who were often aligned with each other and differed in view from an increasingly "disillusioned" Thomas, who felt that the LF was "not a real political party" but a "group poor in human material and organising ability".

The candidates nominated by the LF for the 1955 election drew criticism from the SLP, which considered the list of candidates "injudicious" as it included several who had been members of neither the SLP nor the SSP. The situation worsened when Marshall drew up a constitution and the LF applied to officially register as a political party, with the SLP now alleging that the LF had been established only as an "ad-hoc committee" to ensure that the SLP and SSP did not "step on each other's toes" in the upcoming election, and that the LF had now "overstepped its mandate" by registering the LF, thus implying the "dissolution" of both the SLP and the SSP. This culminated in the General Council of the SLP voting in early November to withdraw from the LF at a meeting called by Abdullah, demanding by letter that both Koh and Mendis resign their seats on the LF's governing committee. The council then accused the LF's executive committee of having hidden "their real interests." Koh and Mendis initially avoided commenting on the situation and were expected to dispute this decision. The withdrawal was an early "set-back" for the LF, which had "so far been quite promising."

In responding to the General Council's letter, sent by general-secretary Lee Yong Min, Mendis accused the council of "not only prejudicing but seriously hampering the cause of the masses for whom [they] worked." He told them that he "neither [wanted] to meet [them] nor see the faces of any one of [them]." He told them to record his resignation from the SLP. In turn, the General Council voted, in a meeting attended by six members of the council, including Abdullah, Manyam, Lee and Moorthy, to officially expel Mendis instead, considering his response to be "unsatisfactory and equivocal" and proclaiming the SLP to be the "only genuine organisation to voice the grievances of the workers in the Colony."

Unlike Mendis, Koh did not immediately respond to the letter, and so the General Council of the SLP was initially undecided on what to do about him. However, the council voted at the start of January 1955 to expel Koh for having "disobeyed", the SLP annual report released on 5 January included a page-long "attack" on Koh and Mendis. Abdullah then alleged that the LF had been "turned into a deadly weapon to hoodwink the people of Singapore and kill the Labour Party." Abdullah was replaced as president later that month by Manyam, who died in office later that year; nobody was elected his successor. The SLP fielded just one candidate, secretary-general Lee, for the election in April, and with his loss to an LF candidate, Mak, the party lost all of its representation on the Legislative Assembly of Singapore and did not contest in any further elections.

==== 1955 election and aftermath ====
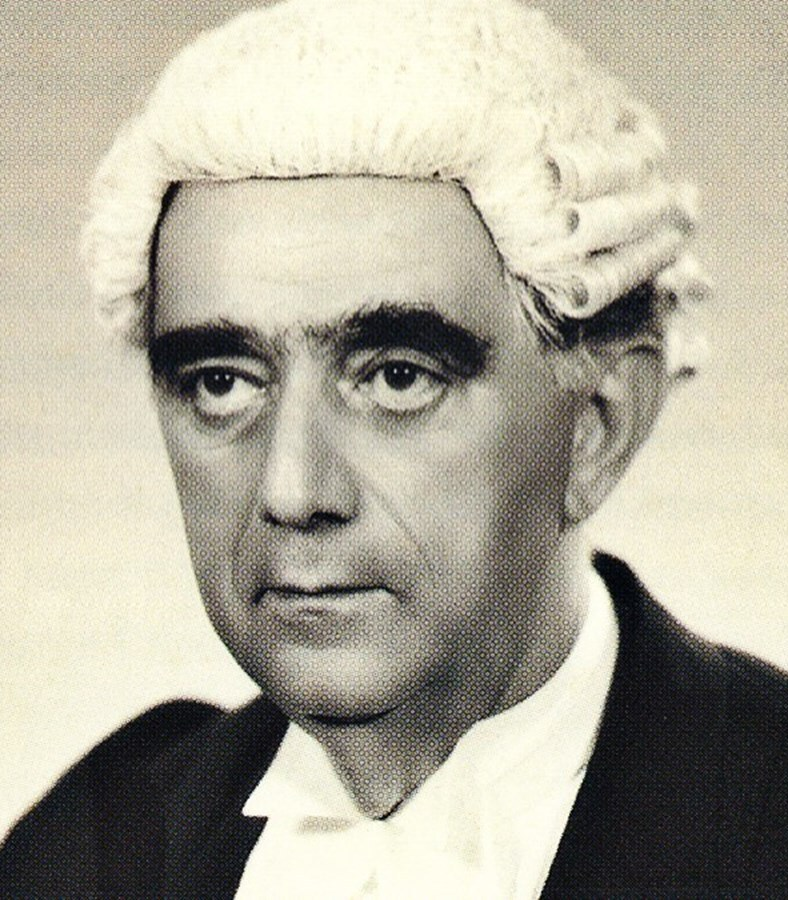
David Marshall, who was named Chief Minister with the Labour Front's victory in 1955.

Mendis supervised the campaign of and actively campaigned for the LF in the 1955 election cycle. At an election rally, he "warned" against voting for the PP and the Democratic Party, and urged voters to instead "be true to [themselves] and vote for the Labour Front." He was warned the evening before another rally that a "physical struggle" was expected to break out. At the rally, he purportedly stood between "two threatening crowds, each numbering hundreds", and by the "sheer force of his personality he compelled them to listen to reason and the fight was averted."

On election day itself, 2 April, the LF won in a major upset, winning 10 of the 25 seats up for election, with the PP, which had initially been projected to win, coming in second with just four seats. Marshall, who was "regarded as the party leader" and had defeated C. C. Tan in Cairnhill, was expected to be the first to occupy the post of Chief Minister of Singapore. On the night of the election, after the reveal of the LF's victory, Marshall returned to the executive offices of the LF, where he was "kissed and garlanded" by Thomas, Koh and Mendis. Marshall then approached UMNO leader Abdul Hamid Jumat and decided to work with the UMNO-MCA-Malay Union Alliance, which had all three constituent parties successfully elect one candidate, to form a coalition government with a narrow majority of 13, though the Malay Union ultimately refused to be a part of the Labour Front's government. M. P. D. Nair, who had been elected as an independent, then joined the LF.

After the election, Governor John Nicoll offered Thomas the post of Minister for Local Government, Lands and Housing. He accepted this, thus breaking the "pact" that the Executive Committee had regarding assuming ministerial posts. Koh and Mendis were dismayed, though they "reluctantly acquiesced" as the nomination had come from the Governor. After this, the pair began "pressuring" Marshall to nominate their own "acolytes" to ministerial positions. These included Mak and Lee Choon Eng, who were recommended as assistant ministers. Jumabhoy later recalled that Mendis, Marshall and Lim Yew Hock, as well as possibly Thomas, were primarily behind nominating individuals for the incoming Cabinet. According to him, Mendis was one of a handful of individuals considered for a nominated post on the Legislative Assembly, though on hearing this he immediately stated: "I do not want to be."

Later in the month, Captain T. D. Richards, a master mariner and unionist who was a member of the LF and a former SLP chair, accused Marshall of failing to honour a pledge made by the LF's Executive Council that he would be selected to be a nominated member of the Legislative Assembly, calling him to resign as Chief Minister. He claimed that Mendis and Koh had promised him this in exchange for his withdrawal from the election; he was initially to contest in the Ulu Bedok Constituency against Jumat. According to Richards, Mendis had hoped for him to remain on the assembly for a year, though Richards could only serve for six months as he could not afford to "lose the $1000 with which [he] would do while in the Assembly" for more than that. Marshall claimed to have had no knowledge of this pledge, which Richards disputed, and that he did not find Richards to be as capable as the members he nominated for the Legislative Assembly.

Shortly after the elections, reports of Koh supposedly resigning from the LF emerged. Mendis denied on 14 April that there was a "difference of opinion among members of the Front", alleging that the party had faced "very few" troubles so far and that it had had "no considerable difficulty" in dealing with the aftermath of the election. However, Koh instead publicly stated that it was "not yet time to comment" on the reports of his resignation. Koh would later write to the The Singapore Standard to deny the reports, proclaiming that he would "never resign" and noting that the sometimes "heated" nature of debates between party leaders indicated that the party was "virile and that all views [were] being strongly presented", he then pointed out that it was a "well known fact" both Marshall and Mendis were "strong advocates". On 14 April, Mendis left for Ceylon on holiday; more than 1,000 LF supporters came to bid him farewell at the quay. The crowd reportedly included "men of all walks of life". Some of these supporters had escorted him with 10 chartered buses from his house in Bukit Timah. Malcolm MacDonald, the Commissioner-General for Southeast Asia, was also present. The number of people who wished to be present to see him off was said to have been so numerous that it was "impossible to get sufficient transport" for them. Indian Daily Mail opined that this was representative of how Mendis was "esteemed by a wide circle of people" for his "keen interest in various works of national interest".

Mendis was posthumously credited as the "architect" of the LF's "overwhelming" victory in 1955. The Labour Front was described by Solicitor General Alfred Victor Winslow as Mendis's "magnum opus". Mak recalled that Mendis had worked "tirelessly" through election season despite being in ill health. He stated that, despite Mendis's age, he had worked to "see established in Singapore, a Government that would serve the interests of the working class." According to Gunasekera, the party had been "on the verge of collapse" shortly after the elections, as Marshall was "said to have shown a frigid disdain to most of his ministers and undisguised contempt for the committee." Gunasekera noted that Marshall did not attend committee meetings and considered his leadership to be autocratic. In his opinion, it was "only a feeling of loyalty to the wise council" of Mendis that led Marshall to realise this and move to rectify the issue, thus "[averting] catastrophe." Jumabhoy also felt that Marshall had had a "good regard" of Mendis.

The Labour Front stated on Mendis's death: "The political life of Mr. Mendis is the political history of the Labour movement in Singapore." Gunasekera reported in July 1955 that, with Mendis gone, the members of the LF had begun to feel "dissatisfied" with the "icy indifference" of the remaining members of the Executive Committee. He proclaimed Mendis "the man who built the Front", and that with his death there was no one left to "aid and guide the party on sound and proper lines."

== Personal life and death ==
Winslow recalled that Mendis had a "bluff, hale and hearty manner which proved somewhat infectious and he always appeared to be full of joie devivre." Mendis married in about late 1925. His wife, with whom he had one son and one daughter, fell ill in January 1929; her health deteriorated significantly in April. She was admitted to a hospital in Penang on 20 April 1929 and underwent an operation. This was successful, though she did not recover from its side effects and died before midnight. He was reportedly a "racing enthusiast". Mak, a close associate of his, saw him as a father, a "true guide and a counsellor."

On the evening 1 September 1948, Mendis found his syce, the Boyanese driver Ishal bin Mohamed, lying across the driving seat of his car, then parked at the junction of Bras Basah Road and Bencoolen Street, dead. His death was ruled to have been due to natural causes. The event was one of the "local stories" from the Bras Basah area adapted by playwright Jonathan Lim as part of the 2020 play Four Horse Road. Lim reimagined the case as a "gripping crime drama". In late 1950, Mendis moved into a house on Fifth Avenue in Bukit Timah. His residence was sometimes used as a venue for meetings between leaders and other prominent members of the Labour Front.

Mendis went on holiday in 1955 to attend his son's wedding. However, he had already fallen ill by his departure from Singapore and he was immediately hospitalised for high blood pressure, missing the wedding. Though he initially recovered, he relapsed in the first half of May and was admitted to a private hospital in Colombo, where he died on 15 May. He was survived by his two children, three brothers and sister, and was buried in Ceylon the day after his death. The Singapore Standard felt that his work in the 1955 elections "hastened" his death. Mak agreed, believing that Mendis had "drove himself into his task" and "discovered too late that it had taxed his strength beyond endurance."

Mendis received tributes from various LF leaders, including Mak, Koh, Minister for Health A. J. Braga and Marshall, who stated that the LF "mourns the passing of a man generous in spirit, a great friend, and a true servant of the people." Winslow, then the Deputy Public Prosecutor, Chief Justice Charles Murray-Aynsley, Justices Clifford Knight, E. R. Taylor and Tan Ah Tah, and R. C. H. Lim representing the local Bar delivered tributes to Mendis in the High Court of Singapore on 24 May. Murray-Aynsley asked that a record of the proceedings be kept in the court's archive. A requiem high mass was held in his memory at the Cathedral of the Good Shepherd on 27 May. The service was conducted by Vicar-General Michel Bonamy in the presence of Michel Olçomendy, the Archbishop of Malacca and Singapore, and was attended by Marshall and Thomas of the LF, Public Relations Officer George G. Thompson, as well as several lawyers and judges, including Winslow, Mercy Rajah, Reynold Lionel Eber and S. F. Ho. Rajah took over Mendis & Co. after.
