= F. Bernard Oehlers =

Singaporean lawyer and magistrate

Oehlers in 1949.

Frederick Bernard Oehlers (28 April 1904 – 27 March 1981) was a Singaporean lawyer and magistrate. He was appointed the Third Polce Court Magistrate in 1947, serving as one of three local-born magistrates, though he resigned just two years after and was then embroiled in a legal dispute with boxer Al Rivers. He stood as a candidate in the December 1949 Singapore Municipal Commission election as a member of the Labour Party, receiving just 94 votes and becoming the first in Singapore to lose an election deposit.

== Early life and career ==
Oehlers was born in Singapore on 28 April 1904. A member of a locally prominent Eurasian family, the Oehlers, he was the third son of John Frederick Oehlers of 40 Branksome Road. He was the cousin of doctors Thora Oehlers, F. A. C. Oehlers and R. C. Oehlers, lawyers George Oehlers and Harry F. Oehlers, as well as the nephew of George Rae Oehlers, who was the head of the branch of the family known as the "Lucky Oehlers". He enrolled in Raffles Institution, planning to study law, though on his graduation he became a clerk with the Asiatic Petroleum Company earning $70 a month with, "it seemed, no prospects."

Oehlers spent 11 years with the company, eventually rising to a "well-paid" administrative position. He then resigned from the firm to study law in England. He was admitted to The Honourable Society of Gray's Inn in London, through which he was called to the English Bar on 24 June 1936. The Straits Times then reported that his associates there felt that he was "endowed with energy and ability beyond the average" and believed that he would succeed as a lawyer in England. Oehlers stated that he "would not advise any young man" to follow in his footsteps as he found it "extremely difficult to concentrate on study, having once fallen into the rut of office routine."

== Legal career ==
Oehlers returned to Singapore on 2 September 1936 and was then employed at the law firm of Hugh Ransome Stanley Zehnder, a prominent Eurasian lawyer. On 4 October 1937, he was officially admitted to practice as an advocate and a solicitor in the Straits Settlements. He then established his own practice, Oehlers & Co. The firm moved into the Bonham Building, which had served as a hub for local law firms since the 1920s and 1930s, in 1943, during the Japanese Occupation of Singapore.

=== Magistrate ===
On 25 August 1947, after a decade of practising as a lawyer, Oehlers was appointed the Third Police Magistrate of Singapore, succeeding K. M. Byrne, who sought to study law in London. In this role, he quickly attained a reputation as a disciplinarian. He was one of three local-born magistrates in Singapore at the time. He announced at the start of June 1948 that he would be resigning at the end of the month, though he did not give a reason and ultimately ended up continuing in the post. Oehlers officially resigned in March 1949. He was dissatisfied with his salary in the post and felt that there was "definite discrimination" against the locals which he had experienced as a magistrate and which he felt "[could] never be cured." After this, he returned to private practice.

==== Dispute with Al Rivers ====
Al Rivers in 1951

Less than a month after his resignation, Oehlers was arrested at his home on 25 March and charged with "causing criminal proceedings to be taken" against Al Rivers, a former professional boxer, with "intent to cause him injury." Oehlers and Rivers had had an argument at the Carlton Club on 24 February which culminated in Rivers challenging Oehlers to a fight, and Oehlers, Rivers alleged, having the other arrested and charged with being drunk and disorderly, as well as for denying him bail when Rivers was taken to the Orchard Road Police Station. The two had previously met when Rivers's case involving his "affairs" with Dorothy Paglar was seen in Oehlers's court, though they did not know each other personally. Rivers was then found not to have been drunk that evening, though he had consumed one bottle of beer and left another unfinished, and was acquitted thereafter.

Oehlers was released on $1,000 bail on 26 March, having claimed trial. The case was first postponed to 2 April for mention, though it was transferred from the Second Police Court to the Third District Court and it was again postponed, now to 5 April. Hearings were scheduled for 27, 28 and 29 April. The prosection was conducted by Philip Hoalim Sr. and Oehlers was defended by Victor J. Mendis and E. M. Tampoe-Philips, as well as Pat Johnson. M. H. MacDougal, the Fourth Police Court Magistrate claimed as a witness at the second hearing that, on being informed of the proof of Rivers's sobriety, he had requested that Oehlers meet him to discuss the case. He then stated that Oehlers had told him that the police had erred in that he had only asked for Rivers to be charged with disorderly conduct, disputing what the arresting officers claimed, and that he would "leave it to [MacDougal] to do what he thought best.

After being acquitted, Rivers met with MacDougal, who recalled that he "seemed to be suffering from a sense of injury against Oehlers", making a "long series of complaints" against the latter. However, he came out of the meeting choosing not to take "fresh action" against him. Rivers later met with MacDougal a second time, choosing then to take action against Oehlers. Mendis argued that, as a magistrate, Oehlers was within his rights to call the police if he felt that there was a "danger of a breach to the peace", and that the argument had necessitated such a call. He then alleged that, while Oehlers could have himself arrested Rivers as a magistrate, he did not do so as Rivers was a boxer. Oehlers then explained at a hearing on 29 April that Paglar had come to sit at his table at the Carlton Club before being asked to dance by Rivers. While the couple danced, Oehlers alleged that he noticed Rivers "jabbing" Paglar in the ribs. He then claimed that, after dancing, Paglar began to cry, and this led Oehlers to tell Rivers off when the latter came to their table to "annoy" Paglar. This culminated in the argument and his report to the police, during which, he claimed, Rivers "smelt strongly of alcohol" and "dashed at him and tried to assault him."

The Third District Judge, Tan Ah Tah, ruled in Oehlers's favour and acquitted him, having found that the prosecution had failed to prove that he had "[known] there was no just and lawful ground for causing criminal proceedings to be taken against Rivers". However, Tan also criticised Oehlers's conduct in denying Rivers bail, finding that this was a right that he was entitled to.

=== Private practice ===
After quitting as a magistrate, Oehlers re-established Oehlers & Co., which was again housed in the Bonham Building. The Singapore Free Press reported in 1953 that he was then among the lawyers who "frequently [attended] lower courts", alongside A. J. Braga and Tsan Yu Huan. In 2017, Gregory Vijayendran, the President of the Law Society of Singapore, singled out Oehlers as one of several "familiar names" who were practising in Singapore in 1967, alongside Nazir Ahmad Mallal, Mohamed Javad Namazie, C. C. Tan, T. W. Ong, David Marshall, Wee Eng Lock, R. S. Boswell and Thomas George Dunbar.

In August 1951, Oehlers was put in charge of defending nine of the 13 men charged with the murder of Charles Joseph Ryan, a non-commissioned officer with the Royal Air Force, as part of the Maria Hertogh riots. The other four men were defended by Lee Kuan Yew, who claimed to have "applied [himself] to the case more assiduously" than Oehlers, as the latter was already well-reputed as a lawyer and Lee had only been called to the Bar relatively recently. Lee stated that he did most of the cross-examination. Of the 13 men, nine, including eight of the men Oehlers defended, were found guilty, while the rest were acquitted, though Lee later recalled that he had "no doubt" that all of the men he defended were guilty of the murder.

== Politics ==
Oehlers joined the Labour Party (SLP), formed in 1948 to advocate for workers' rights by unionists, in particular M. A. Majid, P. M. Williams and M. P. D. Nair. It was the second political party active in Singapore at the time, after the Progressive Party (PP). Oehlers claimed that he had chosen the SLP as he felt that it was a party "for the workers".

Oehlers was announced in mid-October as one of the six candidates fielded by the SLP to contest in the upcoming election for the Municipal Commission, to be held on 3 December, alongside S. M. A. H. Chisty, Mak Pak Shee and S. S. Manyam. The last two candidates, as well as the Wards each candidate was to contest, were then still kept under wraps to "keep the Progressives guessing about their opponents". Of the four candidates revealed, only Chisty had previously stood for election. The PP had taken control of the commission in the previous election in April, winning 13 out of 18 seats, with the SLP winning just one. In December, six seats were up for grabs, one in each ward; of these seats, four were occupied by PP members, with the other two being occupied by independents. The PP attempted something similar with regard to keeping the electorate "in the dark", though all four of the party's commissioners whose term ended in December were expected to stand for re-election. Manyam was then disqualified, leaving just Oehlers, Chisty and Mak as the SLP's revealed candidates.

Incumbent H. A. Jivabhai (left) of the Progressive Party and independent K. Jagatheesan were Oehlers's two opponents in the City Ward.

The SLP announced its full line-up for the election on 25 October; Oehlers was to contest in the City Ward against incumbent H. A. Jivabhai, who had been elected as an independent but was now with the PP, bringing the total number of PP incumbents to five. E. V. Davies, M. P. D. Nair and V. K. Nair were announced as the remaining candidates. Oehlers's candidacy was officially proposed by R. S. Boswell and seconded by Pat Johnson, who was the SLP's sole representative on the commission. On 7 November, nomination day, it was revealed that banker K. Jagatheesan would also be contesting the City Ward seat as the only independent in the election; this was the only ward with three candidates as opposed to two and thus the only one which was not a direct match-up between an SLP candidate and a PP candidate. He was generally viewed as having a "fighting chance" against both Oehlers and Jivabhai.

In assessing Oehlers's prospects in the election, Victor J. Mendis, who was the SLP's campaign organiser, considered Jivabhai a "merchant prince" and noted that Jagatheesan was the president of the All-Malaya Indian Bankers' Association and a land developer, and claimed that Oehlers had been, in contrast, an office worker, and that he was "ambitious and hardworking" in studying law. He felt that, given his legal training, Oehlers could be "relied on for good judgement and to fight to protect the rights of others." Noting that the two major voting blocs in the ward were businessmen and labourers, Mendis felt that if voters judged "independently and judiciously" and "[acted] in the interest of [themselves] and their fellow citizens", then Oehlers's victory "[could not] be difficult to anticipate." At the end of November, The Sunday Times reported that neutral observers generally considered Jagatheesan a "cert" to beat both Oehlers and Jivabhai.

In campaigning, Oehlers claimed that he was "well-acquainted" with the issues faced by the working class, citing his early career as a clerk. He claimed that he would "[prevent] the wasteful expenditure of public funds." Oehlers avoided canvassing for votes by going door-to-door as both Jivabhai and Jagatheesan were doing visiting those in the electorates as he felt that it was "bad to trade in with the conscience of the voters by embarrassing them with personal visits." Instead, he regularly participated in public election meetings. In response to a letter by PP leader C. C. Tan on the SLP published in a newspaper, Oehlers took a cutting of the newspaper including the letter to a rally near The Cenotaph and tore the cutting up, proclaiming: "This is what I think of C. C. Tan." He accused the PP of "[hanging] around back lanes to canvass votes rather than [going] before the electorate and [talking]."

On 24 November, he challenged both Jivabhai and Jagatheesan to hold public election meetings in the ward as he had been and claimed that he would readily answer questions from the public at his meetings. Jivabhai responded to this by stating that he "[did] not believe in cheap propaganda" and opined that voters were already familiar with what he had done thus far as Commissioner and with his platform, and that the latter had already been outlined in his manifesto. At the SLP's last election meeting, Oehlers noted that neither Jivabhai nor Jagatheesan had taken up his challenge.

In the election, Oehlers received just 94 votes, behind Jivabhai with 353 and Jagatheesan, who won the City Ward seat with 561. As Oehlers received well under one-eighth of the total votes cast in the ward, he lost his $250 election deposit. This made him the first candidate in Singapore to lose their deposit. Oehlers's loss was considered a "severe set-back" for the SLP, which had otherwise performed relatively well, winning two seats, one of which had previously been occupied by a member of the PP.

== Personal life and death ==
While in England, the aviator Geoffrey de Havilland taught him how to fly a plane. By 1949, he was the only local-born member of the committee of the Royal Singapore Flying Club, as well as the only local-born member of the club to have attained an "A" licence in flying. He was appointed to the Advisory Committee which was to aid in the organisation of the Malayan Air Training Corps. He acted as the club's president in early 1955 and was elected the secretary by 1957. In April 1960, he was elected the club's vice-president. By late 1949, Oehlers had been elected the president of the Society for Prevention of Cruelty to Animals. His wife was nominated as an honorary member of the society.

Oehlers died at the Nightingale Nursing Home on 27 March 1981.
