= D. Stevens =

Singaporean politician (born 1916 or 1917)

Stevens in 1952

D. Stevens (born 1916 or 1917) was a Singaporean politician, trade union leader, and shopkeeper who served as the general secretary of the Labour Party and as a vice-president of the Singapore Army Civil Service Union.

Stevens joined the Labour Party in 1948 and became associated with a faction led by P. M. Williams, which increasingly dominated the party's affairs. He was elected general secretary of the party in 1952. During the crisis that followed the expulsion of party chairman Lim Yew Hock, Stevens initially resigned as general secretary and from the party's General Council, claiming to have opposed the expulsion. He was subsequently persuaded to remain in the post. Stevens unsuccessfully contested the Rochore Ward in the 1952 Singapore City Council election as a Labour Party candidate.

== Early life and education ==
Stevens was born in the city of Madras in India in 1916 or 1917. He received his tertiary education at the Annamalai University in Chidambaram, Tamil Nadu. He served with the British Indian Army for six years during World War II. He was demobilised in British Malaya.

== Union work ==
Stevens came to Singapore after the war. He was first a clerk and a teacher before he became a shopkeeper with the War Department. Stevens soon became involved with the Army Civil Service Union (ACSU). At the end of June 1950, he was appointed to a delegation of ACSU members alongside P. M. Williams, M. P. D. Nair, ACSU President V. K. Nair, S. Sankaran and How Chee Wah, who were to meet John Strachey, the Secretary of State for War of the United Kingdom, demanding that the 500 storekeepers of the War Department who were represented by the union be paid a housing allowance and that they be officially recognised as non-industrial workers as they had previously been just a year ago, thus allowing them to be entitled to the benefits that came with that status. As industrial workers, they were required to work longer hours for less pay, which they considered a "grave injustice".

The War Department refused to meet their demands, and so the ACSU voted on 1 July to call for a strike. Additionally, the War Department claimed that the union represented only clerks. In response, the ACSU formed a sub-group, the Store Personnel Group, representing the storekeepers, and Stevens was elected its chair. This was followed the day after by the formation of another sub-group representing telephone operators and supervisors, with plans for a third sub-group representing workers paid a daily salary. This was done to push the department to recognise the union as "representative of all Army civilian workers." He continued to serve in that post into the mid-1950s. He led a mass protest by the storekeepers on North Bridge Road in February 1951, declaring that their "patience had come to an end" after several rounds of failed negotiations. At the ACSU's annual delegates conference, held on 18 March, he was nominated to be elected as president, though he and Khng Jit Cheng followed M. P. D. Nair in withdrawing their nominations, though the lattermost would rescind his nomination and eventually win by one vote over S. S. Manyam.

In May 1953, Stevens was appointed to a nine-member committee, chaired by ACSU president S. T. V. Lingam, which was to survey the salaries of 25,000 unionised employees of the War Department across Singapore and the Federation of Malaya. The various unions representing the employees believed that the workers should receive a pay rise as there had not been an "adequate salary revision" since 1947. He was elected a vice-president of the ACSU alongside Chew Seng in March 1954, under Lingam as chairman and with P. R. Williams as general secretary and Wong Fook Lim as treasurer.

At the annual conference of the Singapore Federation of Services Union, held on 9 July 1950 after three years of the union "lying dormant", Stevens was elected to its General Council, alongside union leaders such as M. P. D. Nair and S. Jaganathan. V. K. Nair was elected the president and Williams an assistant secretary. The union pushed for amendments to the Trade Union Ordinance which would allow for the formation of a Singapore Trade Union Congress. These had previously been announced by the Commissioner for Labour.

In 1960, Stevens was invited by the International Confederation of Free Trade Unions in Calcutta to teach a special course on "industrial relations law", catering to Asian union leaders, at its college there from 12 to 24 September, after which he would return to Singapore. He had previously attended the college as a student in 1957 and was made an associate of the institution. The course was attended by around 40 union leaders from across Southeast Asia.

== Politics ==
In 1948, Stevens joined the Labour Party (SLP), formed in September of that year to advocate for workers' rights by unionists, in particular M. A. Majid, M. P. D. Nair and P. M. Williams. It was the second political party active in Singapore at the time, after the Progressive Party (PP). The party was highly factionalised, with major groups including a "left-wing", comprising members such as Williams, V. P. Abdullah, and E. S. Moorthy. This faction of the party, considered more radical and comprising "white-collar office workers", was spearheaded in particular by P. M. Williams. They stood in opposition to a more moderate faction, the party's "right-wing", comprising mostly Chinese "professionals and businessmen", which came to be led in particular by Francis Thomas, a former chair of the SLP, and Lim Yew Hock, who succeeded Thomas as chair.

At the party's 1952 annual conference, held in March, Stevens was elected the SLP's general secretary, with his predecessor in the post, P. M. Williams, choosing not to contest the position. Lim was re-elected chair, and Thomas and the Williams brothers were among the 11 elected to the General Council. A new constitution was also adopted at the conference. In order to "prevent unauthorised releases" to the local press, it was decided that all official press releases of the SLP would be delivered by Stevens as the general secretary.

=== Candidate nomination dispute ===
In July 1952, it was announced that Stevens was considering standing as a candidate in the upcoming City Council election. The SLP then had five candidates on the council: E. V. Davies, V. K. Nair, Lee Choon Eng, S. M. A. H. Chisty and Williams's brother P. R. Williams. Of these, Davies and Chisty in the North and Rochore Wards, respectively, had been elected on terms set to expire in December and were looking to run for re-election. Stevens was to apply to run on the SLP ticket as a candidate in the Rochore Ward, as was Abdullah. Ultimately, Abdullah decided against applying, leaving just Stevens and Chisty vying for the Rochore Ward ticket.

It was initially announced that the General Council would finalise the nominations for the election at a meeting on 9 August. However, Lim announced on 27 July that the council had already decided to nominate Stevens over Chisty for the Rochore Ward and Lee Yong Min in the East Ward. Stevens was to be aided in his campaign by the establishment of a Rochore branch of the SLP as part of its "vastly improved" machinery. On 9 August, the General Council finalised A. R. Lazarous as the candidate for the North Ward as opposed to Davies and P. M. Williams over Jaganathan in the South Ward, though it had not yet determined candidates for the City and West Wards. The list of candidates was opposed by a "dissentient" group of the SLP, over 2,000 members strong, who disagreed with the selections of Lazarous, Williams and Stevens. This group felt that the General Council had been "prejudiced" in choosing to field Lazarous, Williams and Stevens and threatened a "mass resignation", calling for an emergency meeting on the matter.

Davies then claimed that the General Council was ruled by a 'clique' which "lacked the confidence of the electorate". He revealed that the SLP allowed non-British subjects as members, and alleged that the annual conference earlier in the year was a "farce" that had been staged in part through bringing a "few lorry loads" of non-local members to vote for preferred candidates through a "stupid" constitution. He accused this General Council of attempting to control its members on the Legislative and City Councils and of making "fantastic pronouncements" for the SLP as a whole. He claimed to have not been aware of any action taken by the General Council which proved beneficial to the party, and felt that they were simply selecting those within their own faction as candidates.

A nine-member committee to represent 2,275 members of the SLP who disputed the selection was established. It submitted a memorandum addressed to Lim, who also opposed the list, on 20 August, stating that it "[could not] recognise the present Council as a valid body, nor can we accept decisions when it has so openly flouted the constitution, which it was elected to safeguard and honour". Copies were distributed to all of the party's representatives on the City Council and its sole member on the Legislative Council, C. R. Dasaratha Raj. The committee accused the council of being "improperly constituted" and a "battleground for personal ambitions" which had done little to progress the "upliftment and welfare of the working class", with its first act since the conference being the expulsion of Davies and Chisty. The committee called for the council to be dissolved and considered its decisions "null and void".

Stevens then told The Singapore Free Press on 19 August that there was no such 'clique' on the General Council, which he claimed was "trying to manage party affairs in a just way." This was followed the day after by an official statement by the SLP denouncing Davies's accusations as "grossly unfounded", claiming that Davies had not raised any objection to the constitution despite being present at the annual conference and that it seemed that he was willing to forego all of these criticisms hoping to be nominated the SLP's candidate for the North Ward. The statement in turn accused him of being "clearly unprincipled in his behaviour" despite being a leading member of the party. It was then explained that the General Council had voted for Lazarous over Davies eight to three as they felt that the latter's "frail" health could not "withstand the strain of elections". Additionally, the General Council attributed Lazarous's previous failure in the North Ward to the "lack of care and attention" Davies provided to his ward. After a three-hour meeting with the committee, Stevens declared on 28 August that the dispute had been "amicably settled." However, the committee disputed this the day after.

=== Resignation ===
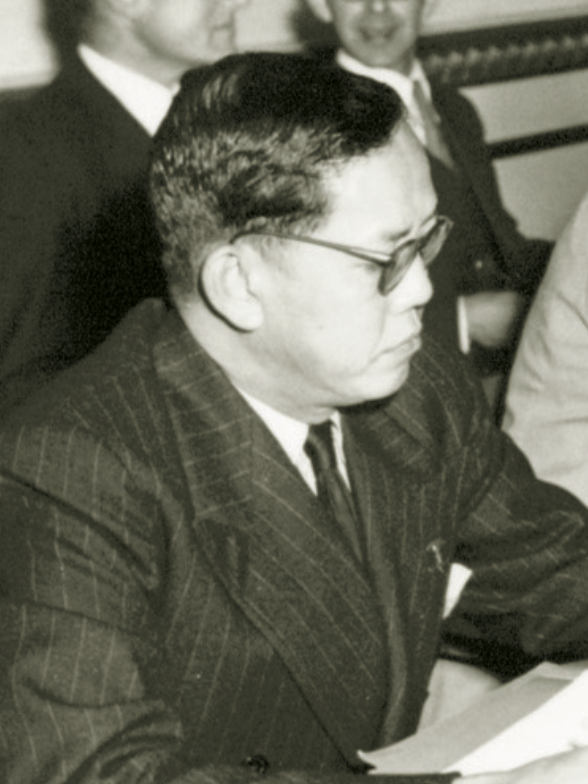
Lim Yew Hock, who was expelled from the Labour Party.

The "rebel" committee gave Lim two weeks to organise a general meeting to "straighten out matters", through which it planned to oust the General Council. Lim agreed to hold a meeting on 31 October, while the General Council worked to expel Lim as chair, declaring the meeting Lim called "unauthorised and unconstitutional." The Council was successful in this, kicking Lim out on 27 October at a meeting attended by all nine members of the council at the time, Stevens, Lazarous, Abdullah, Reddi, P. M. Williams, P. R. Williams, Ho Wing Hon, Lee Yong Min, and N. A. K. Jothi. S. K. Reddi was then appointed to act as chair in the meantime. This led to another major split from the party, in addition to reportedly "[convincing] the public of the utter hideousness" of the SLP.

In response to Lim's expulsion, Stevens submitted his letter of resignation as general secretary to Lim, whom he continued to recognise as the SLP's chair, on 29 October, claiming that he had unsuccessfully attempted to stop the General Council from voting to expel Lim, an act he considered "ridiculous", and that he known felt that it was "imperative that [he] dissociate [himself] from any further activities of the general council. He stated that he had "no doubt" that Lim was supported by the majority of the SLP's members and felt that stepping down was in the party's best interests. Lim noted that, with Stevens's resignation, which followed that of Ho from the General Council, there were only seven left on the council, one less than was required to form a quorum as per the party constitution. He then proclaimed that Williams's faction of the General Council had "died an inglorious death two days after their glorious victory", and that there was now no way for the General Council to avoid holding that general meeting such that the council could be reconstituted. I. S. Menon, the leader of the committee, stated that, while they felt that Stevens's resignation was "welcome", they ultimately considered it a "face saving device."

Over 800 members of the 'rebel' faction met at the Singapore Badminton Hall on 31 October and unanimously voted to express confidence in Lim as chair and to call for the resignation of P. M. Williams. An ad hoc committee comprising the sitting SLP councillors with the faction, including Dasaratha Raj, was formed. Thomas was named its convenor, and he accepted the post "reluctantly". Davies, V. K. Nair, Lee Choon Eng, Chisty and M. P. D. Nair, who had been expelled from the SLP earlier in the year and was now an "independent Labour" councillor, all attended the meeting, with P. R. Williams being the only absent SLP councillor. Stevens and Ho were also present. The General Council, who held the Badminton Hall meeting to be unconstitutional, met at the same time to find a successor for Stevens, with Reddi finding there to be "no reason" to believe that the vacancy could not be filled. Reddi claimed the day after that the meeting's decisions were "invalid" as it was held unconstitutionally, and that, since Stevens had not sent his resignation to the General Council, it could not be accepted, and thus Stevens was still the general secretary of the SLP. As Ho's resignation had also yet to be accepted, Reddi declared that the council was still "very much alive" with nine members.

On 2 November, Stevens told The Singapore Standard that Lim had not written back to him on his resignation, and that he was "at sea" on his position within the SLP and on what more he could do to "rid" himself of the title of general secretary. He then claimed three days later to have been "gathering expert knowledge" on his "anomalous position" within the SLP and had come to the conclusion that he was technically still the general secretary and, in turn, on the General Council as his resignation had yet to be accepted. As such, he convened a meeting of the council for 8 November, during which he was to ask Reddi to accept his resignation and put forth a motion, giving the council a chance to withdraw Lim's expulsion and to reinstate the latter as party chair. However, at the meeting itself, Stevens was persuaded to stay on as the general secretary, Reddi was confirmed as Lim's successor as party chair and Jaganathan was expelled as he had confirmed that he would be contesting against Williams as an independent. The Standard retrospectively described the confusion over Stevens's position in the party as the point in which the "tragedy" of the SLP's crisis became a "farce".

=== 1952 election ===
Stevens was the first SLP candidate to have his posters put up, doing so by late October, over a week before nomination day. Though he announced his resignation from the post of general secretary of the SLP and from his seat on the General Council, Stevens was still to contest on the SLP ticket in the Rochore Ward. The PP announced that it had fielded merchant Sim Beng Seng to contest the Rochore Ward, and Chisty confirmed that he would be running for re-election, now as an independent who described himself as a "workers' candidate". Stevens's nomination was officially proposed by P. R. Williams and seconded by Wong Fook Lim.

At his first election meeting, held on 15 November, Stevens described himself as a Socialist and stated his belief that "material advancement and tranquility of mind" could only be achieved through the "application of Socialist principles" to the city's problems. This was followed by a series of election meetings the next day, one of which featured Dasaratha Raj as a speaker. In supporting Stevens, Dasaratha Raj claimed that Chisty had been rejected as the nominee for his poor performance as city councillor. At a meeting on 18 November, he pointed to the City Council's debts and claimed that electing a PP candidate would further them, while stating that the SLP had "concrete" plans to address the debt. Sim then noted at a campaign meeting of his that he was considered the "stiffer" candidate to Stevens, and pointed to the latter's withdrawal of his resignation as SLP general secretary as evidence of his indecisiveness. Stevens and Chisty were expected to split the labour vote.

In the election, Stevens came second with 1,388 votes, ahead of Chisty with just 520 but behind Sim, who had won the seat with 1,935, thus netting the PP a seat formerly held by the SLP. The SLP as a whole performed poorly. Of the four candidates fielded, only Lazarous won his seat. Lee Yong Min was defeated by PP incumbent Amy Ede, and Jaganathan had won over Williams. In contrast, the PP won four of the seats. The Singapore Standard opined that Stevens and Chisty had "co-operated successfully for their mutual defeat." Reddi then proclaimed that he would "set about reorganising the party with a view to rejuvenating the rank and file", though the Standard felt that it was rather the SLP's leaders who were largely responsible for the SLP's defeat.

=== Reddi's chairmanship ===
At the start of 1953, Stevens announced that the SLP was to issue new "fool-proof" membership cards as part of its reorganisation effort, and that even members who had been expelled would be eligible to apply for them. At a general meeting on 22 January, Stevens proclaimed that they would continue to be "tough when it comes to action" on the 'rebel' faction. In response, Jaganathan stated that the committee continued to view the General Council's actions and authority as "questionable". In the same month, a delegation of the Labour Party in the United Kingdom, led by Saul Rose, a scholar who was then the party's International Secretary, visited Singapore. They met with the General Council and recommended that Lim's expulsion be withdrawn, and in return Lim would hand over items of the SLP which had been kept with him, including a "large number" of member application forms. Stevens then announced on 8 February that Lim's expulsion from the SLP would be rescinded and that his party membership would be restored.

S. K. Reddi, Lim's successor as chair of the Labour Party.

In early July 1953, Reddi initially announced that the newly reconstituted General Council of the SLP would be selecting candidates to contest all six wards in the City Council election, held later that year, at a general meeting on 18 July. He asked that SLP members "forget their differences and personal loyalties" and "give the general council a chance" to steer them through the election. The SLP's "rebel" faction then threatened to nominate its own candidate for the South Ward, and Reddi announced in response that he would seek to negotiate with this faction. The faction protested against the delay of the party's annual conference, which had initially been scheduled for July and which, according to Reddi, had to be postponed, and demanded that the meeting to select the candidates be held "immediately".

Reddi scheduled a Party Council meeting, the first in a "long time", for the night of 18 July, though he soon found the day before that none of the councillors had been told of the meeting despite him instructing Stevens to inform them of it. He then declared that he would resign if the meeting had to be postponed. Seven members of the General Council arrived for the meeting and found that neither Reddi nor Stevens were present, thus forcing the meeting to be postponed. The day after, Reddi claimed that it was the rest of the General Council that was absent, stating that he and Stevens had arrived at the SLP office at 7.30 p.m. and found only Dasaratha Raj, and that when the pair left to retrieve the minutebook, Dasaratha Raj had too disappeared. An attempt was then made to reschedule the meeting to 25 July.

The Indian Daily Mail suggested that this was a "stunt", designed to "secure some publicity" for the SLP's leaders, and opined that it revealed the party leaders' "utter irresponsibility and indifference to the party and to whatever cause it claims to champion." It also noted that Reddi claimed that party membership had fallen to just around 300, down from the thousands which it had previously claimed, which it still considered doubtful. The Daily Mail reported that the SLP had been accused of being "only alive during the elections" and "dead as muttons throughout the rest of the year", and that it was "nothing but an election machine." Several former leaders of the party had opined that the SLP was "long since dead or on the point of dying." The Daily Mail itself declared the party to be "of no use to the Colony."

Reddi officially resigned on 21 July, opining that the party's situation was now "hopeless and intolerable" and that it had "ceased to exist as a coherent body in anything but name." He accused P. M. Williams of dominating party affairs behind-the-scenes through members of his faction on the General Council, outvoting Reddi on "every worthwhile issue" and preventing the party from achieving any meaningful progress. He claimed that, in stepping down, he was handing over "nominal control" of the SLP to "the man who [had] all this time been in actual control of it."

Williams accused Reddi of having resigned over his failure to solve the party's various issues and to avoid being publicly voted out as chairman at the SLP's annual conference. He claimed that Reddi had rarely introduced any motion which the General Council could outvote to begin with, and that he had mostly voted with the council. Stevens called Reddi "one of those noisy rebels and dissidents", opining that the allegations of a 'clique' dominating the council were now a "time-worn slogan" and "much frivolous talk", challenging the rebels to bring "friends and supporters" to the SLP's annual conference to overthrow this 'clique'. In response to Williams, Reddi claimed that it had been impossible to pull the party out of its crisis as Williams and his 'clique', including Stevens, were "mad after personal position and power". At the annual conference in September, Moorthy was elected the general secretary of the SLP, succeeding Stevens.

Stevens later joined the short-lived Singapore Indian Congress party on its formation in late 1957, and was elected its founding president. On taking office, he urged the local Indian community to "solely and unequivocally" identify themselves with Singapore and contribute to its development.
