= Vayloo Pakirisamy Pillai =

Singaporean politician (1894–1984)

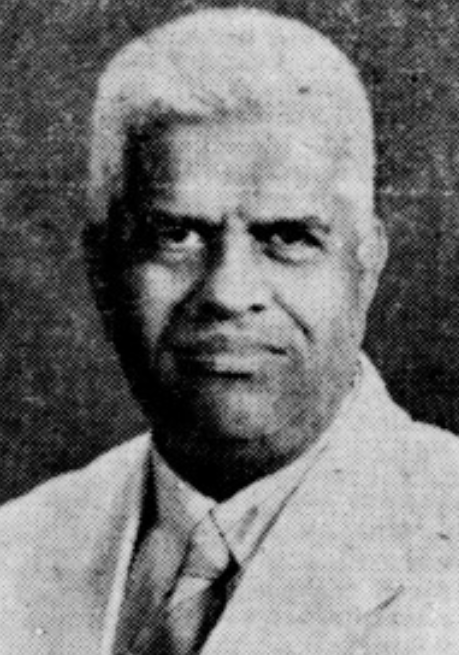
Pakirisamy in 1951

Vayloo Pakirisamy Pillai (11 December 1894 – 25 May 1984) was a member of the Singapore Advisory Council and the Municipal Commission of Singapore and a leader of the Indian community of Singapore. He served as the president of the Singapore Indian Association and the Inter-Religious Organisation.

== Early life and education ==
Pakirisamy was born on 11 December 1894 at Cairnhill Road in Singapore to prominent merchant Koona Vayloo Pillai and Alamaylo Ammal. His parents arranged for a tutor to teach him Tamil while he learned English at the Anglo-Chinese School. In 1909, he and his family went on a trip to India where they visited several major temples. However, while on a trip, he and several other members of his family contracted a disease. Pakirisamy recovered after a day while his uncle, aunt and eldest sister died of the illness.

== Career ==
In 1915, Pakirisamy worked for the government for three months before quitting. In April of the following year, he began working as a clerk at Allen & Gledhill, a local law firm. He remained there for 25 years, retiring in 1941.

Pakirisamy and his brother Narayanasamy Pillai inherited their father's estate following his death in 1931. He became the president of the management committee of the oldest Hindu temples in Singapore, the Sri Mariamman Temple on South Bridge Road, the Sri Krishnan Temple on Waterloo Street, the Sri Manmatha Karuneshvarar Temple on Kallang Road, the Sri Srinivasa Perumal Temple and the Sri Veeramakaliamman Temple, both on Serangoon Road, in June 1935. Pakirisamy built the temple's halls and walls in memory of his mother. He served as the vice-president of the Ramakrishna Mission Singapore, and he built the Malai K. Vayloo Pillai Hall on the second floor of the mission's headquarters in memory of his father. Pakirisamy also served as the president of the Central Indian Association and the Singapore Indian Association. However, he resigned from his position on both associations in protest of the government's handling of recent strikes by Indian labourers.

From 1946 to March 1948, Pakirisamy served on the Singapore Advisory Council. In 1947, he was made a Justice of the Peace. He was the only Indian member of the Advisory committee, which was established in 1948 due to the Emergency Regulations. He joined the Singapore Progressive Party and was nominated the party's second candidate for the three-seat North constituency in the Municipal Commission of Singapore in the April 1949 Singapore Municipal Commission election following the withdrawal of the party's initial nominee, A. J. Dorrett. He came in second with 18.4 per cent of the votes, behind Pat Johnson, and thus became a member of the Municipal Commission. On 1 March of the same year, he was appointed a member of the Board of Licensing Justices. Pakirisamy was nominated the Progressive Party candidate for the Seletar Constituency in the 1951 Singaporean general election. He came in third, with only 27.01 per cent of the votes, after Vilasini Menon and N. G. Nair.

Pakirisamy was elected the president of the Inter-Religious Organisation in May 1951. He also served as the chairman of the Hindu Advisory Board. In June 1952, he was conferred the MBE. He received the Queen Elizabeth II Coronation Medal in the following year. In May 1966, he was presented with a ponnadai at the Perumal Temple for his contributions to the local Hindu community. In 1970, he was awarded the Bintang Bakti Masyarakat. Pakirisamy served as the president of the Indo-Malayan Association and the vice-president of the Tamil Education Society and the China Society. He was a member of the Mohammedan and Hindu Endowments Board, the Singapore Education Committee, the University of Malaya Singapore Appeal Committee, the Board of Visitors to Saint John's Island Quarantine Station, the Advisory Committee on T.B. Treatment and the Allowances, Silver Jubilee Fund Committee, the Rent Conciliation Board and the Film Appeal Board.

== Personal life and death ==
Pakirisamy's mother arranged for him to marry the daughter of prominent Civil Court interpreter R. Suppiah on 8 June 1911. They did not meet prior to their wedding. They celebrated their golden wedding anniversary in 1961. He died on 25 May 1984.
