= Mercy Rajah =

Singaporean lawyer (1915–1993)

Rajah in 1947.

Mercy Jayarani Rajah (née Thevathasan; 1915 – 23 December 1993) was a Singaporean lawyer. Initially a schoolteacher, she quit her job in 1947 to study law, returning to Singapore in 1951 and becoming the first Ceylonese woman to be enrolled as a solicitor or advocate there in 1954. She was a partner of the practice of Victor J. Mendis and was involved in the political party he governed, the Labour Front.

== Early life and teaching ==
Rajah was born in 1915. She was the daughter of Samuel Thevathasan, a Methodist pastor and educator who was from Jaffna, British Ceylon. She was the younger sister of social worker and local Rotarian leader Arthur Thevathasan and the older sister of medical official Victor Thevathasan, Oliver Thevathasan and Christopher Thevathasan. In 1919, her father was invited to teach at the Anglo-Chinese School in Singapore, and he moved there with his family. She first received her early education in Kuala Lumpur before enrolling at the Raffles Girls' School in Singapore, after which she furthered her studies at the Raffles College. She initially followed in her father's footsteps and began teaching at the Methodist Girls' School.

Rajah was, like her siblings, musically inclined. She learnt to play the organ, and became the organist at the Wesley Methodist Church on Fort Canning Hill and the Dutch Reformed Church. She went to "rescue" the organists of St Andrew's Cathedral when they were interned during the Japanese occupation, in addition to playing with the church. The Straits Times attributed her involvement with the local churches as organist to her father's role as the honorary secretary to the Federation of Christian Churches. She also played the piano, viola and sang; she was reportedly the first woman in Singapore to pass the Trinity College London examinations in 'vocal music' and also successfully took the college's ACTL performance diploma. Rajah was also involved in the local girl guiding movement and helped restart it after the occupation, leading two companies.

In 1947, Rajah quit as a schoolteacher to go study law in England with the intent of eventually becoming a barrister. She left Singapore in August and was then admitted to the Honourable Society of Lincoln's Inn. While in London, she also planned to study church music and visit the girlguiding headquarters there, as well as Foxlease. At the end of 1951, Rajah returned to Singapore, where she took her final Bar examination. She then began teaching at the Raffles Girls' School before she was notified in early July that she had passed the examination.

== Career ==
=== Law ===
In November 1952, Rajah filed a notice to the High Court Registry, seeking admission to the local bar. She was enrolled as a solicitor and advocate of the Bar in January 1954, becoming the first Ceylonese woman to achieve this on the island. She then became a partner of the legal firm Mendis & Co., which was the practice of Victor J. Mendis, a Ceylonese lawyer who was also a co-governor of the Labour Front (LF) political party. Following his death in mid-May 1955, she continued with the firm. On 18 August 1958, she instead joined the Attorney-General's Department as a Crown Counsel and Deputy Public Prosecutor. She was still practising as of 1975.

=== Politics ===
Rajah became a member of the LF, formed in August 1954. On 28 September, the LF announced 12 of the candidates in its lineup for the next general election, to be held in April of the following year. Rajah was among the three of the 12 who were lawyers, alongside David Marshall and C. F. J. Ess, and the only woman. In November, The Singapore Free Press reported that Rajah was among the four candidates the LF had announced that had yet to be allocated a division, alongside S. M. Hussain, P. M. Williams and Tio Seng Bee. None of the four would ultimately contest the election, and the LF would instead announced in March that hostel matron Khew Pee Ging, a "surprise candidate", would be the only woman running on the LF ticket and one of only two women in the election as a whole, alongside Elizabeth Choy of the Progressive Party. Neither were elected.

On 25 June 1955, she and fellow Ceylonese lawyer W. Abeyagoonesakara appeared in court over a dispute regarding an office at 1-A Raffles Place as it was feared that their "strained" relationship might "lead to a breach of the peace." Abeyagoonesakara was then still occupying the space, while Rajah claimed that, on Mendis's death just a month ago, the latter had left her the office in his will, hoping to see it be used by the LF's upcoming Women's Section. The section's inaugural meeting was held on 25 February 1956, at which she was elected its secretary.

== Personal life and death ==
Rajah was married with two daughters. In 1975, she filed a lawsuit against the Singapore Bus Services after she fell and injured her leg while riding the bus, and was awarded $6,580 in damages and $1,750 for legal fees. She died on 23 December 1993 and was cremated at the Mount Vernon Complex two days after.
