= 1889 Singapore Municipal Commission election =

Elections to Singapore Municipal Commission took place in 1889.

== Background ==
The Municipal Ordinance was passed in 1887 which created a partly-elected Municipal Commission that would oversee local urban affairs in Singapore.

A candidate for a Municipal Commission election would need to have a proposer and a seconder from among the registered voters in one of the five wards in Singapore. Once a candidate is nominated, a voting date is scheduled. The election system did not provide for political party affiliations for candidates but municipal commissioners are generally affiliated with ethnic or trade associations.

A candidate needs to secure at least 20 votes to be elected as a municipal commissioner. Sole candidates who failed to secure the 20 required votes may be appointed by the Governor of the Straits Settlements as a municipal commissioner.

If there are two or more candidates contesting in a ward, voters would elect one of the candidates.

If there are no nominations in a ward, the Governor may appoint someone to represent the ward.

== Elections ==
Election date	Ward	Candidate	Votes	Source
29 June 1889	No. 3 Tanglin	Frederick Gerald Davidson	24	
6 December 1889	No. 2 Central	Tan Ben Wang	59	
6 December 1889	No. 4 Rochore	Lim Eng Keng	43	
