= Phyllis Eu Cheng Li =

Singaporean politician (1914–2004)

Singapore Municipal Commission
- In office 1949–1951

City Council of Singapore
- In office 1952–1957

Personal details
- Born: Chia Cheng Li; 9 July 1914
- Died: 7 July 2004 (aged 89) Singapore
- Party: Progressive Party
- Spouse: Robert Eu (m. 1935)
- Children: 3, including Bernice Eu
- Education: University of Sydney, Raffles College

Phyllis Eu Cheng Li, née Chia (also known as Mrs. Robert Eu) was a city councilor that became the first woman to be elected into public office in Singapore. She joined the Municipal Commission in 1949 and was re-elected twice representing the Progressive Party. During her time in office, she worked to strengthen consumer rights and to help involve women in politics. She was formally inducted into the Singapore Women's Hall of Fame in 2014 for her legacy.

== Early life ==
Chia Cheng Li was born in 1914 to managing director of United Motor Works Chia Yee Soh and his first wife Seow Guat Eng. She went to Methodist Girls' School and joined the Teachers’ Training College before transferring to Raffles College a year later. Graduating in 1935, she taught at St Margaret's Church of England School until the outbreak of World War II when her family fled to Australia, where she studied at the University of Sydney before the family returned to Singapore in 1946. Upon her return, she worked for Zenana Mission School and later Paya Lebar Methodist Girls’ School in 1953. In 1935, she married teacher Robert Eu and took his name.

== Political career ==
Li ran for election to the Singapore Municipal Commission in 1949 representing the Progressive Party in the Western ward. She won the third seat with 26.0% of the votes and became the first woman elected to public office. The same year, she was re-elected again during the 1949 December election where she increased her share to 62.8% of the votes. In 1951, the Singapore Municipal Commission was replaced with the a City Council after Singapore was reclassified as a British city. A year later, Li won her third election in the same ward with a 10.6% majority.

When the Progressive Party and the Democratic Party merged into the Liberal Socialist Party in 1956, Li became an independent, but stood down at the December 1957 election and retired from politics.

== Election results ==
Singapore Municipal Commission (Western Ward) April 1949
Candidate	Party	Votes	Percentage	Outcome
Cuthbert Francis Joseph ESS	Progressive Party	431	27.8%	Elected
GAW Sien Khian	Progressive Party	424	27.3%	Elected
Phyllis EU-CHIA Cheng Li,	Progressive Party	403	26.0%	Elected
Madai Puthan Damodaran NAIR	Labour Party	293	18.9%	

Singapore Municipal Commission (Western Ward) December 1949
Candidate	Party	Votes	Percentage	Outcome
Phyllis EU-CHIA Cheng Li	Progressive Party	477	62.8%	Elected
Vellekat Kesavan NAIR	Labour Party	283	37.2%	

City Council of Singapore (Western Ward) 1952
Candidate	Party	Votes	Percentage	Outcome
Phyllis EU-CHIA Cheng Li	Progressive Party	1,139	51.4%	Elected
Stella MANYAM	Independent	904	40.8%	
J. George V. PARAMBIL	Independent	174	7.8%	
