= Bernice Eu =

Singaporean-born Australian politician and doctor (born 1938)

Member of the South Australian Legislative Council
- In office 23 October 1990 – 10 October 1997
- Preceded by: Martin Cameron

Personal details
- Born: Eu Swee Lian 余瑞蓮; 2 May 1938 (age 88) Singapore
- Party: Liberal
- Relations: Phyllis Eu Cheng Li (mother)
- Education: University of Adelaide
- Profession: Medical practitioner

Bernice Eu (born Eu Swee Lian, previously Pfitzner; 2 May 1938) is a former Australian doctor and politician. She was a member of the South Australian Legislative Council from 1990 to 1997, representing the Liberal Party.

== Early life ==
Eu was born in Singapore. Her mother Phyllis Eu Cheng Li was a school principal who became the first woman elected to the Singapore City Council. Her maternal grandfather Chia Yee Soh was a wealthy businessman who founded United Motor Works.

Eu and her family were evacuated to Australia following the Japanese invasion of Singapore in 1941. The family returned to Singapore after the end of the war where she attended Methodist Girls' School. In 1963 she moved back to Australia to study medicine at the University of Adelaide. She subsequently worked as a general practitioner.

== Politics ==
Eu was the Liberal Party candidate in the safe Labor seat of Price at the 1989 state election. She used her married name "Bernice Pfitzner" during her political career.

Eu was appointed to the South Australian Legislative Council on 23 October 1990, filling a casual vacancy. She served as chair of the Social Development Committee and led an inquiry into rural poverty. She was defeated in her bid for election to a full term at the 1997 state election.

At the 1998 federal election, Eu stood for the Senate as an independent, heading a three-person ticket under the slogan "Say No To Intolerance". The group aimed to "counterbalance those parties it perceives as intolerant and racist, including Pauline Hanson's One Nation and Australia First".

== Personal life ==
In 2022, Eu published a memoir titled Vulnerable but Invicible: Memoirs of a Singapore Doctor in Australia.

=== Relationship with Oday Al Tekriti ===
After leaving politics, Eu worked as a doctor at the Woomera Immigration Reception and Processing Centre. In 2003, she remarried to Oday Adnan Al Tekriti, a former bodyguard of Iraqi dictator Saddam Hussein.
