= 1958 Singapore City Council by-election =

A by-election for the Singapore City Council was held on 26 July 1958 following the resignation of Chang Yuen Tong, the representative for Kallang Constituency. Chang stated that he was unable to balance the responsibilities of his job with those of the Workers' Party (WP), of which he was a member. However, People's Action Party (PAP) leader Lee Kuan Yew later claimed that Chang's resignation had been influenced by communist leader Fang Chuang Pi as part of a coordinated strategy.

In the by-election, the WP nominated Lo Ka Fat as its candidate. He contested the seat against Lim Ser Puan of the Labour Front, Buang bin Omar Junid of the PAP, and Govindapillai Maruthamuthoo Kanagasabai, who stood as an independent candidate.

== Election deposit ==
The election deposit was stated at $250. As both candidates Lo Ka Fat and Govindapillai had failed to achieve the minimum 12.5% of the votes, both candidates lost their deposit.

== Historical significance ==
This was the only by-election held for the Singapore City Council, and it was also the final City Council election before the council was abolished in 1959. The PAP, upon forming the government that year, dissolved the council with the stated aim of preventing it from functioning as a pressure group within the government structure.

Following the council's dissolution, its municipal responsibilities were taken over by various statutory boards. This arrangement remained in place until 1988, when the management of local municipal functions was transferred from the civil service to the newly established town councils. Unlike the City Council, these town councils do not hold separate local elections and are instead administered by the elected Member of Parliament (MP) representing the respective constituency.

== Results ==
Candidate	Party	Votes	%	+/–
Buang bin Omar Junid	People's Action Party	4,279	52.04	New
Lim Per Suan	Labour Front	3,566	43.37	+20.6
Lo Ka Fat	Workers' Party	304	3.70	–37.8
Govindapillai Maruthamuthoo Kanagasabai	Independent	74	0.90	New
Total		8,223	100.00	–
Valid votes		8,223	98.70	
Invalid/blank votes		108	1.30	
Total votes		8,331	100.00	
Registered voters/turnout		14,308	58.23	
Majority		713	8.67	
People's Action Party gain from Workers' Party				
