= Pat Johnson (municipal commissioner) =

Singapore politician

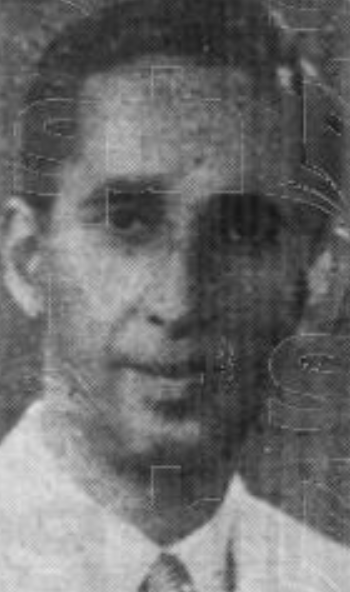
Pat Johnson

Patrick Joseph Johnson was a member of the Municipal Commission of Singapore representing the Labour Party and a lawyer.

== Early life and education ==
Johnson was born to a working class family in Cardiff. He received his education in British Malaya.

== Career ==
Johnson was initially employed as a temporary clerk. He joined the Malayan Forestry Department in 1925, eventually rising to the rank of extra assistant conservator of forests before his retirement from civil service in 1939. In 1943, he was called to the Bar at the Inner Temple. He then became a member of the Fabian Society, the Haldane Society of Socialist Lawyers and the Socialist Party of Great Britain.

Johnson joined the Labour Party. He won April 1949 Singapore Municipal Commission election for North Ward, and was the only Labour candidate to have won a seat in the election. In June, he was asked by the rest of the commissioners to draft a legislation for the requisitioning and control of all vacant premises in Singapore. In June 1950, Johnson refused to serve as the party's president or vice-president despite being nominated as his confidence in the party was "shaken". He left the party in July. His resignation was accepted by the party during a meeting of the party's General Council on 25 August. However, he retained his seat as an Independent Labour Commissioner. He retired from the commission in 1951. He also served as a solicitor and a barrister in Singapore.

== Personal life ==
He had a daughter. On 11 December 1950, he was attacked by rioters during the Maria Hertogh Riots and was badly injured. He briefly went missing, and was found the next day in a drain. He regained consciousness on 15 December. By 1953, he had moved to England.
