= December 1949 Singapore Municipal Commission election =

- 3 December 1949

6 of the 18 elected seats in the Municipal Commission
- Turnout: 60.44%
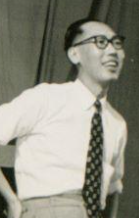

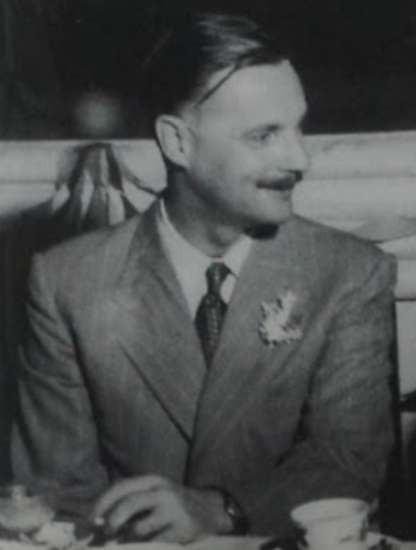
	First party	Second party
Leader	Tan Chye Cheng	Francis Thomas
Party	Progressive	Labour
Leader's seat	Did not contest	Did not contest
Seats before	13	1
Seats won	3	2
Seats after	12	3
Seat change	▼1	▲2
Popular vote	3,907	3,338
Percentage	50.05%	42.76%

The December 1949 Singapore Municipal Commission election took place on 3 December 1949 to elect 6 of the 18 seats in the Singapore Municipal Commission.

== Results ==
Party	Votes	%	Seats				
Party	Votes	%	Total before	Won	Not up	Total after	+/–
Progressive Party	3,907	50.05	13	3	9	12	–1
Labour Party	3,338	42.76	1	2	1	3	+2
Independent	561	7.19	4	1	2	3	–1
Total	7,806	100.00	18	6	12	18	0
Valid votes	7,806	98.28					
Invalid/blank votes	137	1.72					
Total votes	7,943	100.00					
Registered voters/turnout	13,143	60.44					
Source: Singapore Elections

=== By constituency ===
Constituency	Electorate	Party	Candidate	Votes	%
City	1,811	Independent	Jagatheesan Kalimuthu	561	55.7
City	1,811	Progressive Party	Hassan Ali Jivabhai	353	35.0
City	1,811	Labour Party	Frederick Bernard Oehlers	94	9.3
East	2,491	Progressive Party	Amy Ede	1,464	64.4
East	2,491	Labour Party	Mak Pak Shee	556	35.6
North	2,199	Labour Party	Edward Vethanayagam Davies	803	59.5
North	2,199	Progressive Party	Chong Thutt Pitt	546	40.5
Rochore	3,255	Labour Party	Syed Mohamed Abdul Hameed Chisty	979	52.9
Rochore	3,255	Progressive Party	Syed Hassan Al-Junied	871	47.1
Rochore	3,255	Independent	M. Abdul Rahim Khan	28	1.2
South	2,061	Progressive Party	Duncan Robertson	654	51.2
South	2,061	Labour Party	Madai Puthan Damodaran Nair	623	48.8
West	1,326	Progressive Party	Phyllis Eu Cheng Li	477	62.8
West	1,326	Labour Party	Vellekat Kesavan Nair	283	37.2
Source: Singapore Elections
