= 1951 Singapore City Council election =

- 1 December 1951

6 of the 18 elected seats in the Singapore City Council
- Turnout: 59.33%
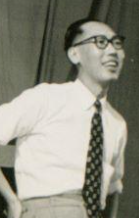

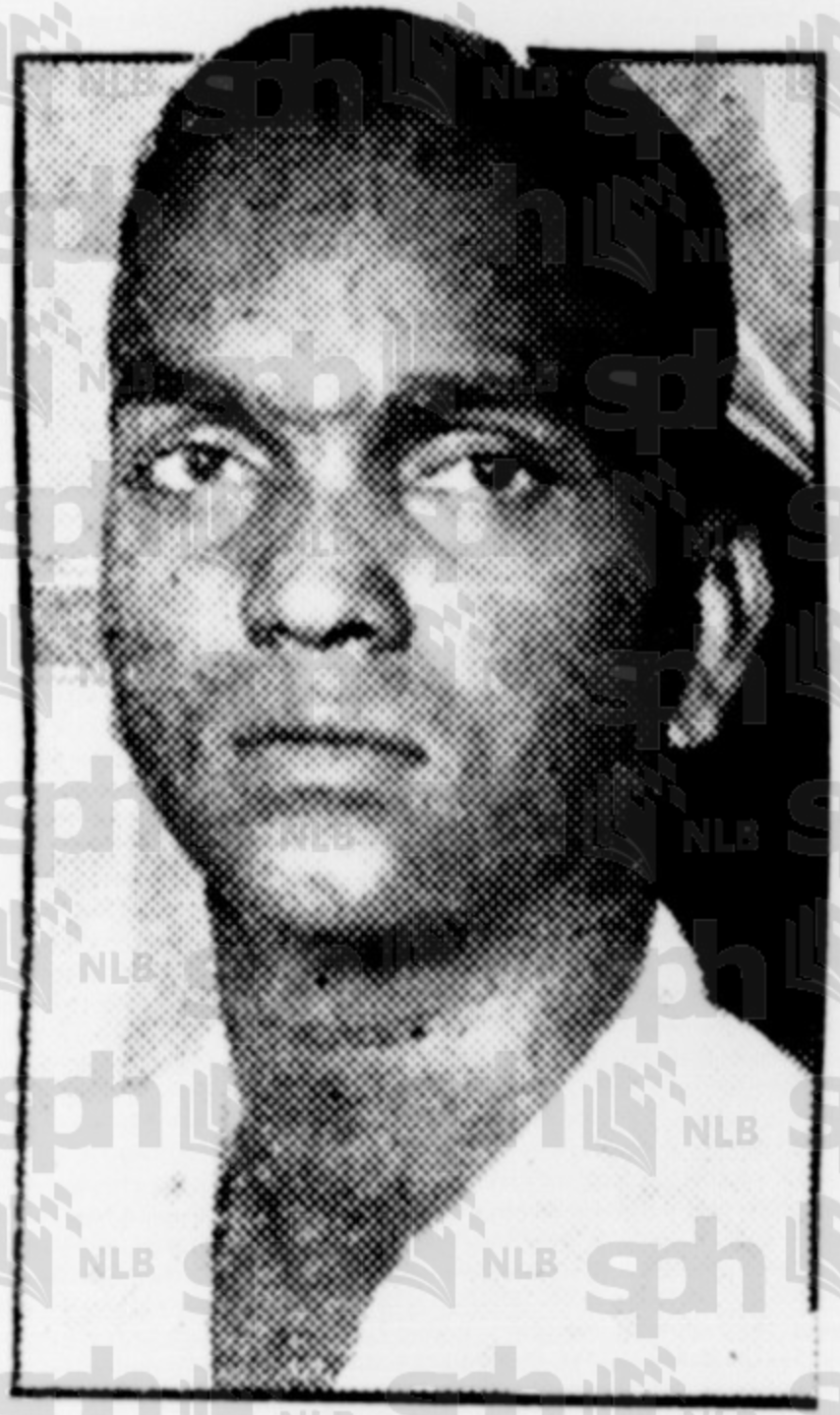
	First party	Second party
Leader	Tan Chye Cheng	Peter Williams
Party	Progressive	Labour
Leader's seat	Did not contest	Did not contest
Seats before	10	3
Seats won	2	3
Seats after	9	6
Seat change	▼1	▲3
Popular vote	6,729	4,436
Percentage	43.20%	28.48%

Elections to Singapore City Council were held for the first time on 1 December 1951 to elect six of the council's 18 elected members.

== Results ==
Party	Votes	%	Seats				
Party	Votes	%	Total before	Won	Not up	Total after	+/–
Progressive Party	6,729	43.20	10	2	7	9	–1
Labour Party	4,436	28.48	3	3	3	6	+3
Independents	4,412	28.32	5	1	2	3	–2
Total	15,577	100.00	18	6	12	18	0
Valid votes	15,577	97.85					
Invalid/blank votes	343	2.15					
Total votes	15,920	100.00					
Registered voters/turnout	26,831	59.33					
Source: Singapore Elections

=== By constituency ===
Constituency	Electorate	Party	Candidate	Votes	%
City	4,277	Independent	Hassan Ali Jivabhai	1,154	56.5
City	4,277	Progressive Party	M. Oli Mohamed Mohamed Kassim	887	43.5
East	4,797	Progressive Party	Chan Kum Chee	1,401	49.2
East	4,797	Labour Party	Lee Yong Min	724	25.4
East	4,797	Independent	Mak Pak Shee	720	25.3
North	4,783	Progressive Party	Arumugam Ponnu Rajah	1,378	42.7
North	4,783	Labour Party	Anthony Rebeiro Lazarous	1,074	33.3
North	4,783	Independent	Anthony Pecci Netto	641	19.9
North	4,783	Independent	Siow Siang Yew	136	4.2
Rochore	4,648	Labour Party	Philip Rajanayam Williams	1,761	63.7
Rochore	4,648	Progressive Party	Seah Peng Chuan	1,005	36.3
South	5,985	Labour Party	Vellekat Kesavan Nair	1,933	57.0
South	5,985	Progressive Party	Manickvasagar Subramaniam	1,457	43.0
West	2,341	Labour Party	Lee Choon Eng	705	54.0
West	2,341	Progressive Party	Cuthbert Francis Joseph Ess	904	46.0
Source: Singapore Elections
