= April 1949 Singapore Municipal Commission election =

- 2 April 1949

18 elected seats in the Municipal Commission
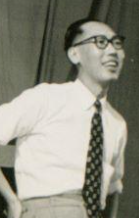

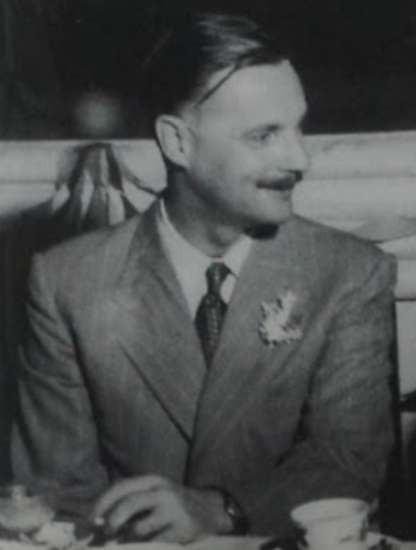
	First party	Second party
Leader	Tan Chye Cheng	Francis Thomas
Party	Progressive	Labour
Leader's seat	Did not contest	Did not contest
Seats won	13	1
Popular vote	8,782	1,894
Percentage	59.68%	12.87%

The April 1949 Singapore Municipal Commission election took place on 2 April 1949 to elect 18 of the 27 seats in the Singapore Municipal Commission.

== Background ==
The election was the first election for the Singapore Municipal Commission since the municipal commissioner elections on 5 December 1911. In 1913, elections for the Singapore Municipal Commission were scrapped due to excessive politicking.

Following the end of World War II, elections were brought back for the Singapore Municipal Commission. Out of the 27 seats in the Singapore Municipal Commission, 18 seats were elected. These 18 seats were distributed to six wards in Singapore with each ward having three seats. The remaining nine seats were appointed by the British colonial government.

For the April 1949 election, municipal commissioners were elected to terms of varying lengths depending on their ranking in their respective wards. Commissioners who ranked third in their wards were elected to a term that ended in December 1949. Commissioners who ranked second had a term that ended in December 1950, and commissioners ranking first had a term that ended in December 1951.

Voting in this election was not compulsory, and voters were required to register in order to vote.

Nomination day was scheduled for 7 March 1949. Candidates were required to give an election deposit of $250 which was returned if they achieved at least 4.17% of the votes.

== Results ==
Party	Votes	%	Seats
Progressive Party	8,782	59.68	13
Labour Party	1,894	12.87	1
Independents	4,040	27.45	4
Total	14,716	100.00	18
Registered voters/turnout	8,688	–	
Source: Singapore Elections

=== By constituency ===
Constituency	Seats	Electorate	Party	Candidate	Votes	%
City	3	1,156	Progressive Party	M. Oli Mohamed Mohamed Kassim (Note: Elected for a term ending in December 1951.)	527	27.4
City	3	1,156	Progressive Party	Sandy Gurunathan Pillay (Note: Elected for a term ending in December 1950.)	398	20.7
City	3	1,156	Independent	Hassan Ali Jivabhai (Note: Elected for a term ending in December 1949.)	375	19.5
City	3	1,156	Independent	Lim Koon Teck	326	16.9
City	3	1,156	Labour Party	Syed Mumtaz Hussain	299	15.5
East	3	1,653	Independent	Goh Hood Kiat	885	28.1
East	3	1,653	Progressive Party	Frank Caulfield James	778	24.7
East	3	1,653	Progressive Party	Syed Hassan Al-Junied	766	24.3
East	3	1,653	Progressive Party	Amy Ede	717	22.8
North	3	1,532	Labour Party	Patrick Joseph Johnson	534	20.1
North	3	1,532	Progressive Party	Vayloo Pakirisamy Pillai	489	18.4
North	3	1,532	Progressive Party	Chong Thutt Pitt	450	16.9
North	3	1,532	Independent	P. V. Krishnan	407	15.3
North	3	1,532	Labour Party	Rajaratnam Vaithilingam	393	14.8
North	3	1,532	Progressive Party	Tan Sim Hong	390	14.6
Rochore	3	1,851	Independent	Pandarapillai Thillai Nathan	871	29.9
Rochore	3	1,851	Progressive Party	Sena Ana Mohamed Ali	683	23.4
Rochore	3	1,851	Independent	Ahmad Mohamed Ibrahim	496	17.0
Rochore	3	1,851	Independent	Syed Mohamed Abdul Hameed Chisty	491	16.8
Rochore	3	1,851	Labour Party	Govindapillai Maruthamuthoo Kanagasabai	375	12.9
South	3	1,482	Progressive Party	A. P. Rajah	867	34.5
South	3	1,482	Progressive Party	Abdul bin Samat	760	30.2
South	3	1,482	Progressive Party	Duncan Robertson	699	27.8
South	3	1,482	Independent	Cheah Kim Bee	189	7.5
West	3	1,014	Progressive Party	Cuthbert Francis Joseph Ess	431	27.8
West	3	1,014	Progressive Party	Gaw Sien Khian	424	27.3
West	3	1,014	Progressive Party	Phyllis Eu Cheng Li	403	26.0
West	3	1,014	Labour Party	Madai Puthan Damodaran Nair	293	18.9
Source: Singapore Elections
