= Municipal Commission of Singapore =

Defunct government body in Singapore

The Municipal Commission of Singapore, originally the Municipal Council from 1856, was a body created in 1887 by the British colonial government after the passing of the Municipal Ordinance of 1887 to replace the Municipal Committee that was created in June 1848. Before that, all municipal matters were handled by various committees that were appointed by the British colonial government on an ad hoc basis. However, this proved disorganised, messy and inefficient and was thus discontinued with the introduction of the Commission. The role of the Commission was to manage key services for the Town of Singapore, such as utilities, water services and urban planning. The body previously had their board members internally elected but this practice ceased from 1913 until 1949, after which it acted like a quasi-municipal government for a brief period with local elections until the City Council of Singapore was created in 1951.

== Other information ==
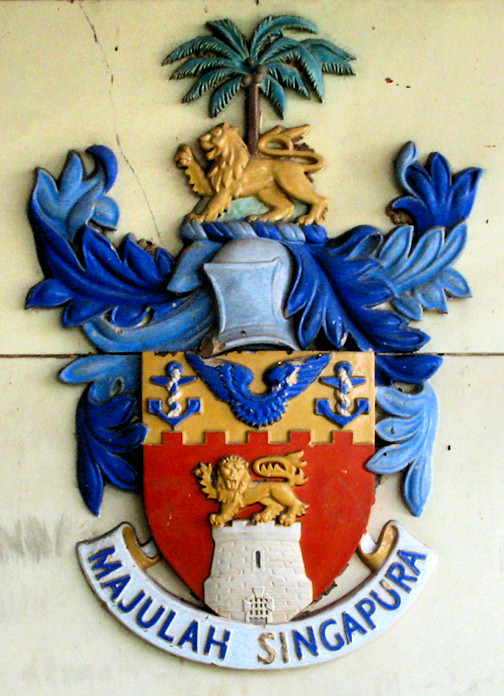
Coat of arms of the Singapore Municipal Commission

The commission elections took place twice (April and December) in 1949 as well as in 1950 with six divisions:

- City
- East
- North
- Rochore
- South
- West

Candidates largely consisted from two political parties, the Progressive Party (PP) and the Labour Party (SLP). There were also independent candidates involved.
