= Progressive Party (Singapore) =

Defunct political party in Singapore

- Chinese name: 进步党; Jìnbù Dǎng
- Malay name: Parti Progresif ڤرتي ڤروݢريسيف
- Tamil name: முற்போக்குக் கட்சி Muṟpōkkuk kaṭci
- Founder: Tan Chye Cheng, John Laycock, Nazir Ahmad Mallal
- Founded: 25 August 1947; 78 years ago
- Dissolved: 10 May 1956; 69 years ago
- Merged into: Liberal Socialist Party
- Succeeded by: Liberal Socialist Party
- Ideology: Conservatism; Progressive conservatism
- Political position: Centre-right
- Colours: Purple

The Singapore Progressive Party (abbreviation: PP), or simply the Progressive Party, was a conservative political party in Singapore that was formed in 1947. The party was influential in Singaporean politics throughout the 1950s. At that time, the self-government power of the legislative system was still rather limited by the British.

== History ==
The Progressive Party was founded by three lawyers, namely Tan Chye Cheng, John Laycock and Nazir Ahmad Mallal. All three were educated at the University of London and were three of the six first ever elected legislative councillors in Singapore. The party was Singapore's first political party. The party decided to use the Vanda Miss Joaquim as its logo, the country's national flower. In its manifesto, PP had campaigned to localise the civil service, implement six years of free education for children, more free medical services, no increase in income tax, and establish a national agency for low cost housing.

In the 1955 Legislative Assembly general election, PP failed to retain power, versus the Labour Front (LF), capturing only four of the 22 seats that it contested, out of the 25 available seats. In 1956, PP merged with the Democratic Party (DP) to form the Liberal Socialist Party (LSP). However, LSP failed to capture sufficient seats and became a minority representation in the Municipal Council following the December 1957 council election. LSP also failed to win any seats in the 1959 Legislative Assembly general election, even though it fielded 32 candidates out of the 51 contested seats. Thereafter, it did not contest in further elections.

== Party ideology ==
PP was made up of English-speaking upper class professionals, and heavily backed by the Straits Chinese British Association and the Singapore Association. It was localist but still relatively pro-British. Its campaign ideology was to advocate "progressive and gradual" reforms, rather than "sudden, quick, radical" ones, which fell in line with British policy at the time, to "slowly" let Singapore gain full self-government. This approach was criticised vehemently by David Marshall, leader of the LF who instead wanted rapid reforms.

== Policies ==
In 1951, PP drafted a law for the setting up of a Central Provident Fund (CPF), which was approved by the British government in 1954. The CPF scheme provides financial security for workers in their retirement or for workers who were unable to work. It came into effect in 1955 when Marshall took office after winning the general election that year. Decades later, the CPF scheme still exists in modern-day Singapore with few revisions and changes.

It was also involved in reforming the Singapore Improvement Trust (SIT), which predated the Housing Development Board (HDB). It supported the formation of the Public Service Commission (PSC) in 1951, the advancement of English as the sole first language of the legislature and the continued preservation of Singapore's free port status. It also supported granting citizenship to about 250,000 ethnic Chinese that was living in Singapore at that time. Some of the reforms that it advocated were represented in the Rendel Constitution in 1955.

== Legislative Council ==
In the Legislative Council, PP worked closely with the British government. The PP nevertheless fought for equal treatment with both local and European civil servants, but this did not please the Chinese-educated locals enough, who were not happy with the party's pro-British stance.

== Election results ==
=== Legislative Council ===
Election	Leader	Votes	%	Seats^{1}						Position	Result
Election	Leader	Votes	%	Up for contest	Contested			Total	+/–	Position	Result
Election	Leader	Votes	%	Up for contest	Seats	Won	Lost	Total	+/–	Position	Result
1948	Tan Chye Cheng	11,754	49.49%	6	5	3	2	3 / 22	▲3	▲1st	Majority elected^{1}
1951	Tan Chye Cheng	11,202	45.37%	9	8	6	2	6 / 25	▲3	1st	Majority elected^{1}

=== Legislative Council by-elections ===
Election	Leader	Constituency contested	Votes	%	Seats				Result
Election	Leader	Constituency contested	Votes	%	Contested		Total	+/–	Result
Election	Leader	Constituency contested	Votes	%	Won	Lost	Total	+/–	Result
1948	Tan Chye Cheng	Rural West	705	23.91%	0	1	0 / 1	Steady	Lost

=== Legislative Assembly ===
Election	Leader	Votes	%	Seats^{2}					Position	Result
Election	Leader	Votes	%	Contested			Total	+/–	Position	Result
Election	Leader	Votes	%	Seats	Won	Lost	Total	+/–	Position	Result
1955	Tan Chye Cheng	38,695	24.75%	22	4	18	4 / 25	▼2	▼2nd	Opposition

=== Municipal Council (1949–1950), City Council (1951–1953) ===
Election	Votes	%	+/–	Seats					
Election	Votes	%	+/–	Up for contest	Contested			Total	+/–
Election	Votes	%	+/–	Up for contest	Seats	Won	Lost	Total	+/–
Apr 1949	10,874	73.89%	-	18	16	13	3	13 / 18	▲13
Dec 1949	3,907	50.05%	▼23.8%	6	6	3	3	12 / 18	▼1
1950	3,902	32.41%	▼17.6%	6	4	3	1	9 / 18	▼3
1951	6,729	43.20%	▲10.8%	6	6	2	4	9 / 18	Steady
1952	9,637	42.88%	▼0.3%	6	6	4	2	9 / 18	Steady
1953	8,532	40.52%	▼2.4%	6^{3}	4	3	1	9 / 18	Steady

1. Only a fraction of all seats are directly elected, the rest are nominated by commercial organisations and British authorities.
2. 25 of the 32 seats are directly elected.
3. Including the return of one unopposed seat.
