= Labour Party (Singapore) =

- Chinese name: 劳工党
- Malay name: Parti Buroh
- Founder: M.A. Majid, M.P.D. Nair, Peter Williams
- Founded: 1 September 1948; 78 years ago
- Dissolved: 1961; 65 years ago
- Merged into: Labour Front
- Succeeded by: Labour Front
- Ideology: Socialism
- Colours: Brown

The Singapore Labour Party (abbreviation: SLP) was a political party in Singapore founded on 1 September 1948 by trade unionists M.A. Majid of the Singapore Seamen's Union, M.P.D. Nair and Peter Williams of the Army Civil Services Union.

== History ==
From the late 1940s, the trade unions had provided a readily accessible base of workers and party members for political parties campaigning on the aspirations of self-government. One such party was the SLP, which wanted to advance the interests of workers and push back against the endemic communist influence in the labour movement. It advocated self-government for Singapore, merger with the Federation of Malaya and creation of a socialist society.

Significant members of the SLP included Francis Thomas who was elected as one of the founding leaders in 1948; and Lim Yew Hock who joined in 1949, and became its president in 1950. Members of the SLP numbered from 3,000 to 4,000 people, and were for the most part, ordinary members of the trade unions whose leaders were already in the SLP. The operations of SLP adopted a rather laissez-faire approach with minimal accounting practices, funds for the elections were often bankrolled by the candidates themselves.

SLP contested the municipal elections from April 1949 to 1953 with some measure of success, winning most of the seats from 1949 to 1952, and improving its vote share from 13% to 40% (1949) before dwindling to 8% (1953). SLP also contested the 1951 general election, winning two of the nine elected seats, with 30% vote share.

From 1952, SLP saw several splits due to internal dissensions. The Singapore Socialist Party (SSP) was created as an offshoot of SLP in 1954, and later on, an alliance between the SLP and SSP, Labour Front (LF) was formed on 21 August 1954. The expressed purpose of LF was to contest the 1955 general election, and several branches were established as outreach throughout Singapore. David Marshall who was the leader of the SSP, Lim and Thomas became its founding members.

In the subsequent 1955 general election the remnant SLP lost its incumbent seats, receiving less than 1% vote share. The original party did not contest further elections, and after the Societies Ordinance came into force in 1960, it failed to re-register.

== Election results ==
=== Legislative Council ===
Election	Leader	Votes	%	Swing	Seats^{1}						Position	Result
Election	Leader	Votes	%	Swing	Up for Contest	Contested			Total	+/–	Position	Result
Election	Leader	Votes	%	Swing	Up for Contest	Seats	Won	Lost	Total	+/–	Position	Result
1951	Lim Yew Hock	7,335	29.70%	Steady	9	7	2	5	2 / 25	▲2	2nd	Opposition

=== Legislative Assembly ===
Election	Leader	Votes	%	Swing	Seats^{2}						Position	Result
Election	Leader	Votes	%	Swing	Up for Contest	Contested			Total	+/–	Position	Result
Election	Leader	Votes	%	Swing	Up for Contest	Seats	Won	Lost	Total	+/–	Position	Result
1955	Lee Yong Min	1,325	0.85%	▼28.9%	25	1	0	1	0 / 25	▼2	▼7th	No seats

=== Municipal Council (1949-1950), City Council (1951-1953) ===
Election	Votes	%	Swing	Seats					
Election	Votes	%	Swing	Up for Contest	Contested			Total	+/–
Election	Votes	%	Swing	Up for Contest	Seats	Won	Lost	Total	+/–
Apr 1949	1,894	12.87%	-	18	5	1	4	1 / 18	▲1
Dec 1949	3,338	42.76%	▲29.9%	6	6	2	4	3 / 18	▲2
1950	4,793	39.81%	▼3.0%	6	6	1	5	3 / 18	Steady
1951	4,436	28.48%	▼11.3%	6	5	3	2	6 / 18	▲3
1952	5,647	25.12%	▼3.4%	6	4	1	3	4 / 18	▼2
1953	1,723	8.18%	▼17.0%	6	1	0	1	5 / 18	▲1

1. Only a fraction of all seats are directly elected, majority are nominated by commercial organisations and British authorities.
2. 25 of the 32 seats are directly elected, 7 are nominated by British authorities.
