= V. K. Nair =

Singaporean politician (1909–1974)

Nair in 1949.

Vellekat Kesavan Nair (27 July 1909 – 7 January 1974) was a Singaporean barrack officer, politician and union leader. He served as a vice president and acting president of the Labour Party and the leader of the Labour Front on the City Council of Singapore. He helped found the Army Civil Services Union and the Singapore Trades Union Congress and served as the president of the former.

A clerk with the War Department, Nair was involved in founding the Army Civil Services Union in 1948 and was elected its founding president. He was elected to the post in 1949, serving for another two years before he was elected a vice-president in 1951, remaining in that post for a year. In 1950, he was also involved in setting up the Singapore Trades Union Congress after several failed attempts to form a similar body in Singapore, leading its preparatory committee.

Nair joined the Labour Party, founded in 1948 by several unionists, including several from the Army Civil Services Union. He unsuccessfully contested the West Ward in the December 1949 Singapore Municipal Commission election, after which he and Lee Choon Eng formed a 'rebel' group to aid them in being nominated as candidates. This worked, and they were both fielded as candidates in the 1951 Singapore City Council election, which saw the both of them elected. He was also a vice-president of the party and briefly acted as its leader.

Nair served on the council's Vehicles and Traffic Committee for several years as vice-chairman and also sat on its Finances and General Purposes Committee. In 1952, he and several other Labour councillors became associated with a 'rebel' faction of the party which opposed the expulsion of Lim Yew Hock by the faction of the General Council led by P. M. Williams, and was elected the leader of this faction on the City Council, which eventually grew to include all of the 'Labour' councillors.

Though his term was initially set to expire in 1954, the City Council elections were postponed indefinitely in that year as Singapore's governance underwent the review of various commissions. As such, his tenure as councillor was ultimately extended till the next City Council election, which would eventually be scheduled for 1957. Though he was expected to stand for re-election, ambiguity regarding the legality of War Department employees running for public office drove him to instead retire from politics.

== Early life and career ==
Nair was born on 27 July 1909 in the Malabar region of India, then under British rule, where he received his education. He was a Malayali. He came to Singapore in about 1929. He successfully took the Faculty of Teachers in Commerce and London Chamber of Commerce Shorthand examinations in June and November 1931, respectively, qualifying him as a 'teacher of Commercial subjects'. In November of the following year, he passed the chamber's secretarial examination. He was made a fellow of the Incorporated Phonographic Society for shorthand writing in June 1946. He was also a fellow of the Society of Certified Teachers of Shorthand and was Pittman's Certified as a teacher.

Nair joined the War Department as an office worker in 1933. By November 1945, following the return of the British after the end of the Japanese occupation of Singapore, Nair was elected the representative of the Medical Auxiliary Services, then at the Former Supreme Court. He became the secretary of the Executive Committee of the Singapore Passive Defence Essential Services, which issued a memorandum on 20 March 1956 to the government comprising recommendations for back pay to service members for the occupation years and before. However, the government decided in the middle of the year to only grant back pay for up to the beginning of the occupation on 15 February 1942. Nair publicly criticised the time it took for them to finally grant arrears, as well as the lack of back pay covering the occupation years.

In August 1950, Nair was promoted to the post of Assistant Officer-in-Charge at the Barrack Office (East), becoming the first civilian in the local War Department to attain the rank of Officer. He eventually attained the post of higher executive officer.

== Union work ==
=== ACSU ===
==== Founding of ACSU ====
Shortly after the return of the British, Nair wrote that Malaya had seen "plenty of political awakening" fuelled by unemployment and the rising cost of living, coupled with wages that had been stagnant since before the occupation, believing that all this would culminate in an "ugly situation" if these were not resolved. In July 1946, an application was made for the formation of a War Department Civilian Staff Association (WDCSA) with Nair as its secretary. An Interim Council of Management was set up, with Nair acting as the honorary general secretary. The council met on 25 August. The association's preliminary general meeting was held at the headquarters of the Malayan Democratic Union on 311 North Bridge Road on 8 September, with the aim of drafting up a set of rules and regulations and to officially elect officeholders for the association, though the latter did not take place then. In November, it was decided that the organisation would work towards registering as a trade union.

The WDCSA's first annual general meeting was held on 23 February 1947; Nair was elected the founding president, with V. S. Philips and Lee Choon Eng as the vice-presidents and M. P. D. Nair as the secretary. The first meeting of the association's council was held on 16 March, at which it was decided that they would ask for the government to institute a "retrospective effect" to the employees' Pyke allowances from 1 April of the previous year. It was also announced that the department had allowed them to reorganise as a union. The association then became the Singapore Army Civil Services Union (ACSU), which held a general meeting on 20 July to elect its officeholders; Nair was again elected founding president, with Lee and M. P. D. Nair as vice-presidents and S. S. Manyam as the general secretary. By April 1948, Manyam had succeeded V. K. Nair as the ACSU's president, and the latter continued with the ACSU as a trustee. The union allied itself with the Air Ministry Local Staff Union (AMLSU) and the Singapore Admiralty Local Staff Union (SALSU), fellow services unions, through the Singapore Federation of Services Unions (SFSU). He was among the services union representatives sent to negotiate with the United Kingdom Civil Labour Committee of Inquiry in August 1949.

==== Second term as president ====
At the 1950 annual delegates' conference, Nair was elected to succeed Manyam as president of the ACSU. He received 50 votes, winning with a narrow majority of just one vote to Manyam's 49. M. P. D. Nair and Sankaran were again the vice-presidents, and P. M. Williams was elected general secretary. The conference coincided with the ACSU's decision to sue the War Department over their refusal to provide arrears to a hundred dismissed employees, and Nair and the rest of the committee were to issue a statement "laying down the union's policy", in addition to deciding on a course of action to deal with that and other issues such as layoffs involving long-serving employees. He then announced that the ACSU would be reorganised with sub-bodies representing each trade, believing this would help foster "better understanding with the employers." The union reported around 6,000 members then.

Nair issued a statement in April accusing the War Office of stalling on the ACSU's demands regarding the provision of housing allowance and ignoring their calls for a revision of salaries. He warned that the union would pursue "other ways of obtaining satisfaction" if the office did not definitively agree to provide housing allowances by the union's Executive Council meeting on 16 April. On the release of the report produced by the Benham Committee at the end of th emonth, Nair urged the government to implement its recommendations while criticising certain recommendations as insufficient. In early May, Nair announced that Executive Council had decided on organising a mass protest meeting later that month, spurred on by the demand for this from its members. The meeting was to be attended by John Strachey, then Secretary of State for War in the United Kingdom, whose handling of the issue at hand was heavily criticised by Nair.

Members of the three Services Unions at the May 1950 mass protest meeting.

The ACSU came together with AMLSU and SALSU to arrange a joint protest meeting, to be held at the Victoria Memorial Hall on 30 May. It was also to be attended by Jim Griffiths, the Secretary of State for the Colonies. Nair was appointed to a joint action committee, with Williams as secretary and alongside Sankaran of ACSU, A. M. Nair, M. B. Menon and M. C. Sequeira of AMLSU, R. P. Eswaran, O. V. Dharan and Chan Peng Kiang of SALSU. It was decided that the meeting would focus on the demands for housing allowances and salary revisions. It was to feature addresses by the presidents of the three services unions, Nair, Eswaran and A. M. Nair, as well as women's and industrial representatives from each of the unions. In his speech, Nair opined that their working conditions were "below the fair standards adhered to by 'good employers' in the Colony." At the meeting, both demands were officially voted on and passed as resolutions.

It was then announced following the mass protest meeting that Nair was to lead a six-member delegation, also comprising Sankaran, Williams, M. P. D. Nair, D. Stevens and How Chee Wah, which was to meet with Strachey to discuss the two resolutions, among other matters. Strachey claimed that the delay in handling housing allowances, which he pledged to resolve by 1 July on the union's suggestion, had been the result of a "protracted delay at the War Office in London." He stated that the union's demands were "very reasonable" and proclaimed that he would be "solely responsible" if they were not met soon. The delegates then opined that Strachey had been "very cautious" in his answers. The Army authorities then offered to provide housing allowances for just married workers, which the ACSU rejected as "unacceptable". The day before his self-imposed deadline, Strachey claimed that he would attempt to resolve this "even at the cost of some little delay". Nair felt that this statement was "well-timed" as the union's members were "beginning to show anxiety" about the situation.

Due to the members' frustration with the department's delay in responding to the demands, the Store Personnel Group voted on 1 July to call for a strike. Additionally, the War Department claimed that the union represented only clerks. Nair then oversaw the formation of sub-groups of the union to represent the various trades, beginning with the Store Personnel Group. This was followed the day after by the formation of another sub-group representing telephone operators and supervisors, with plans for a third sub-group representing workers paid a daily salary. This was done to push the department to recognise the union as "representative of all Army civilian workers." On 20 July, the ACSU cabled an "S.O.S." to Strachey, with Nair arguing that he had taken too long to resolve the issue, and that the General Council was weighing the Store Personnel Group's proposal for a strike.

On 5 October, Nair announced the formation of a sub-committee of the ACSU that was to recommend wage increases for the 11,000 daily-paid civilian War Department employees, noting that their salaries had remained stagnant since 1948. The sub-committee made several proposals for salary revisions based on the report of the Benham Committee, whose recommendations the War Department refused to implement. By February, the ACSU had yet to receive a response on their proposals, and Nair then stated that the union would likely push for "strong constitutional action" to see their proposals through at the upcoming annual conference, to be held on 11 February.

At the end of January 1951, Nair threatened to call a strike over the War Department's refusal to reinstate the clerk status of the 1,400 storekeepers in the Army, who had been relegated to the status of industrial workers and were thus required to work longer hours for less pay. The storekeepers passed a resolution to officially issue a strike threat on 19 February, supported by Nair, Williams and M. P. D. Nair.

==== Vice-presidency ====
S. S. Manyam, elected vice-president of the ACSU alongside Nair.

At the 1951 Delegates Conference of the ACSU, held on 18 March and attended by 109 delegates, Nair was one of five candidates nominated to run for president, alongside Manyam, M. P. D. Nair, Stevens and Khng Jit Cheng. M. P. D. Nair announced his withdrawal from the race, stating that he "could not do full justice" to the post of president while serving simultaneously as a commissioner. He was followed in this by Stevens and Khng. However, Manyam charged M. P. D. Nair with "not having the interests of the Union at heart" by withdrawing, and so the latter chose to remain in the race. V. K. Nair then withdrew, leaving the election a straight fight between Manyam and M. P. D. Nair. In the first ballot, Manyam and Nair tied at 54 votes each, with one spoiled vote. In the second ballot, the remaining vote went to Nair, who was named President of the ACSU. Both rounds were a secret ballot. V. K. Nair and Manyam were then elected vice-presidents.

M. P. D. Nair's victory proved controversial with much of the union, as he had only been nominated for election as president by two of the 19 branches of the ACSU. In contrast, the largest 11 branches had all nominated Manyam instead. In the days following, 12 branches, including all which nominated Manyam for president, declared that they were "dissatisfied" with the outcome of the election and demanded that a Special Delegates Conference be held soon. It was expected that a resolution calling for officeholders to be elected at general meetings, as opposed to Delegates Conferences, would be tabled at the next meeting of the union, though ultimately nothing came of the controversy. In September, the Executive Council of the ACSU voted to affiliate with the newly formed Singapore United Nations Association. Nair was elected a representative of the union to the association, alongside Manyam, Williams, Lee, M. P. D. Nair and J. S. Nair.

By December 1951, Nair had become of five ACSU members who had been elected to the City Council of Singapore, alongside Lee, Manyam, Williams's brother P. R. Williams and M. P. D. Nair. They were accused of having used the union as a "stepping stone" to get into public office. These five came to be known as the "Big Five" and were accused of having entered politics "for their own cause and glory" and of using the ACSU as a "political pawn", though supporters opined that they had performed well as union leaders despite their positions on the City Council. Manyam defended himself and the other ACSU councillors by claiming that they were among the most regular attendees of council or committee meetings, and that they did so "at loss of salary for time taken for [their] W.D. duties."

In late January 1952, five branches of the ACSU nominated their candidates for ACSU president for the upcoming conference. Two nominated Nair and M. P. D. Nair, while the other three named Chew Seng, S. T. V. Lingam and P. L. Gupta. It was then expected that the various branches were preparing to advance "many" resolutions barring members on the City Council of Legislative Council from holding office in the union. M. P. D. Nair then announced during the conference itself, held on 9 March, that none of the City Councillors who held office in the ACSU would be running for re-election, with V. K. Nair, M. P. D. Nair, Manyam and Lee withdrawing their names from the nomination list. However, none of the resolutions which sought to bar them from running in the first place were passed. Chew alleged that Nair had been loaned $250 from the union's coffers to attend the ICFTU conference, which M. P. D. Nair denied.

=== Trade union congress ===
By the end of 1949, there had been at least three separate attempts to form a trade union congress, with each failing as they could not agree with each other and collaborate. These included the Singapore Trades Union Congress by P. M. Williams and Manyam and the Trade Union Council by Lim Yew Hock, a nominated member of the Legislative Council of Singapore who was the council's trade union representative. In March 1950, Nair called for the unions of Singapore to come together to form a democratic Trades Union Council similar to the Malayan Trades Union Councill in the Federation of Malaya, in addition to amending the Trade Union Ordinance to help enable this, arguing that the previous attempts in Singapore had been "foiled" by the local government. He claimed that the ACSU would willingly participate in such an endeavour as "one of the largest unions in Singapore" at the time.

At the end of July, it was announced that the International Confederation of Free Trade Unions (ICFTU) delegation headed by Frederick W. Dalley that was to visit Singapore would be meeting with two representatives each from the SFSU, the three services unions under the SFSU and the two Naval Base Labour Unions. Nair and Sivaswamy were nominated as the SFSU's representatives. Yeo noted that this delegation appeared to have met with the unions with the aim of promoting non-Communist unions as a "counter" to the Soviet-aligned World Federation of Trade Unions, which was then expected to make an "offensive" in the colonies. They successfully appealed to Nair to organise a trade union congress in Singapore, modelled after the Trades Union Congress in the United Kingdom. It would represent only English-speaking unions "for a start". On 21 August Nair officially revealed his plan for a congress, to be made open to all 92 local workers' unions, stating that he would officially propose this at the SFSU's 27 August general council meeting. He claimed to have the support of the ICFTU in this initiative. The congress was to serve as the "voice of Singapore labour, both nationally and internationally", with representatives on both the Legislative Council and the Municipal Commission.

The SFSU agreed to support the proposal for a trade union congress. Invitations were then sent out to unions across the island to send delegates to a meeting which was to establish this new congress, held at the ACSU's premises on 10 September. The Malayan Trade Union Adviser, Jack Brazier, then opined that Nair's bid for a congress was not any more likely to succeed than the three previous attempts as "powerful" local unionists had "expressed opposition" to it. Additionally, Manyam alleged that he and the individuals behind the three previous attempts had not been consulted on the matter, nor had Nair checked to see if any of their interim committees had actually been dissolved. He then stated that he and R. K. Samy, the leader of the third proposed congress and the president of the Singapore Traction Company Employees' Union, still hoped to go forward with their plans. However, a "large number" of unions accepted the invitation nevertheless. The day before the meeting, Samy announced that he would not support the new proposal as he feared it would favour white-collar workers over industrial workers, thus depriving it of the support of a "large section" of the local industrial unions. It was also believed that this "split" in the labour movement was caused by a "clash of personalities" and the division between English-speaking and non-English-speaking unions.

Ultimately, 17 unions, representing an estimated 40,000 workers in total, sent delegates to the meeting. Notable absentees included Lim and Samy, who had both rejected the offer despite being personally invited by Nair. A resolution calling for the formation of a Trades Union Congress in Singapore was unanimously passed, and a preparatory committee was formed to oversee this. Nair was elected the chair and S. Jaganathan the secretary. Nair denied accusations that the body was "sponsored with any motive for personal power, benefit or glory" and claimed that the notion that English-speaking unions would dominate was the result of a "regrettable misunderstanding". In late October, the committee delivered a report in which it claimed to have found that the Singapore labour movement had been "entirely ignored" due to the absence of a trade union congress. Lim gave his support to the effort in that month and he was followed by Manyam, though Samy remained unconvinced over what he perceived as the potential for English-speaking unions to dominate, a view which Jaganathan considered "over-cautious". In mid-November, Nair announced that a meeting for unions interested in the proposed congress would be held soon to form a committee which was to draft a constitution.

A meeting was held on 7 January 1951 for the committee to put forth its report recommending the "early" establishment of a trades union congress that would be "purely co-ordinative" and "without any executive or administrative responsibilities." This report had been subject to "some delay" and was "rushed through" due to its importance, and it was hoped that a "comprehensive study" would be made of the report. The committee noted that the Trade Union Ordinance remained an obstacle and opined that local unions had little hope of successfully pushing for an amendment unless they "[consolidated] themselves" to advocate for it. The meeting was attended by the representatives of 24 unions and the resolution calling for the congress's formation within a month was passed. An interim committee was formed to govern in the meantime; Lim was elected the chair, Williams and Jaganathan the secretaries and Nair to the committee. The inaugural meeting was held on 20 May, at which the Singapore Trades Union Congress (STUC) was officially formed. On 30 September, both Lim and Nair were nominated for election as the STUC's first president. However, Lim won in a landslide, receiving 61 votes to Nair's eight.

=== SFSU ===
By 1950, the SFSU had been "lying dormant" for three years. Nair was then involved in an attempt to revitalise the body by amending its constitution. The federation's annual representatives' conference was held on 9 July, and he was elected president, with Eswaran and A. M. Nair as the vice-presidents and C. S. Sivaswamy as the general secretary. It was decided that the SFSU was to push for amendments to the Trade Union Ordinance to allow for the formation of a Trade Union Congress in addition to the provision of housing allowances and official recognition from their employers. In October, Nair was appointed to a delegation of the SFSU which was to meet with five British Members of Parliament who were visiting Singapore and discuss the working conditions of civilian employees of the British military in Singapore, alongside Sivaswamy, Eswaran, A. M. Nair, M. P. D. Nair and Chan Peng Kiang of SALSU.

In February 1951, Nair announced that the SFSU would appeal to the employers to raise the recently announced 10% increase to the cost of living allowance, which he considered to be insufficient, noting that employees of the War Department were "[finding] it increasingly difficult to manage on the wages they get". Nair stated that this would likely be rejected as they "[did] not show the slightest regard to the extreme hardship" endured by the services employees in their work. The unions under the SFSU were expected to individually take "strong measures" to push for an increased allowance. The SFSU officially rejected the allowance in early April, claiming the support of its members in doing so. Nair claimed that the employers had refused to accept the unions' recommendations on the matter and instead "[ignored] the democratic demands of employees" for an allowance that would allow them to "keep pace" with inflation. He also oversaw the formation of the SFSU's organ in this period. The short-lived paper, the Workers' Herald, was edited by Williams, assisted by Nair, A. M. Nair, Eswaran and Sivaswamy, published in early May.

Nair was selected Singapore's representative to the 1951 Asian Regional conference of the ICFTU, held in Karachi from 28 to 31 May. However, he struggled to raise the $1,500 necessary to make his trip, with Lim and Williams making "urgent" appeals to local unions for donations. He was to speak on the potential for a social and health insurance scheme to be instituted in Singapore, modelled after similar schemes in the United Kingdom and the United States. After the conference, he toured Pakistan. A. M. Nair was appointed to act as SFSU president in the meantime, and Manyam was elected to succeed Nair as president later that month. After returning to Singapore in August, he delivered a report on the conference which was then presented before all local unions. He argued that local unions "must affiliate" with the ICFTU such that they would have greater influence within the organisation, noting that he was relegated to an observer without voting power at the event. The report was then submitted to the STUC for further consideration.

In September, Nair was appointed to a committee that was to organise yet another mass protest meeting of the SFSU that was to protest their employers' handling of the demands for a higher cost of living allowance and salary revisions. The SFSU decided at the meeting to call a strike if their negotiations with the Services authorities in the United Kingdom fell through.

=== Adult education ===
On 30 April, Nair announced that ACSU would be launching a campaign to promote adult education. This came at a meeting featuring T. H. Silcock of the University of Malaya who delivered a speech on "Adult Education and the Trade Union Movement." In July, Nair was elected a vice-president of the People's Education Association (PEA), a local organisation which organised adult education classes, alongside Frederic Mason and under Silcock as president. He was appointed to a sub-committee which was to oversee the selection of an organising secretary for the PEA alongside Silcock, Lee Kuan Yew and B. G. Sahai in August 1951.

=== SWU ===
By July 1956, Nair was the vice-president of the Singapore Workers' Union (SWU), one of the Middle Road Unions. He then alleged that the union's president, Mohamed Yunus bin Ismail, had split from the SWU with 250 workers of the Commissioner-General's Office as they found the union's leadership to be "incompetent". The SWU's executive council then voted to "sack" Yusuf, with Nair arguing that he had "worked against the interests of the union." In August 1957, he stated his support for the government's arrest of 39, including six executive committee members of the next door Singapore Factory and Shop Workers' Union (SF&SWU), as part of an "anti-subversion campaign." The government justified this by claiming that the unionists had first tried to secure a "foothold" in the SWU and that, when this failed, they instead turned to taking over the SF&SWU. Nair was then the SWU's president, though he was again the vice-president by late 1958.

== SLP and elections ==
Nair joined the Labour Party (SLP), formed in 1948 to advocate for workers' rights by unionists, in particular M. A. Majid, alongside several from the ACSU such as P. M. Williams and M. P. D. Nair. It was the second political party active in Singapore at the time, after the Progressive Party (PP). The party soon became highly factionalised, with a "left-wing" comprising the more radical faction led by Williams, and a "right-wing", comprising more moderate factions such as the one led by Lim, aligned with figures such as SLP president Francis Thomas.

=== 1949 election ===
In mid-October the SLP announced four of the six candidates it had fielded to contest in the upcoming election for the Municipal Commission, to be held on 3 December; they were F. Bernard Oehlers, S. M. A. H. Chisty, Mak Pak Shee and Manyam. The last two candidates, as well as the Wards each candidate was to contest, were then still kept under wraps to "keep the Progressives guessing about their opponents". Of the four candidates revealed, only Chisty had previously stood for election. The PP had taken control of the commission in the previous election in April, winning 13 out of 18 seats, with the SLP winning just one. In December, six seats were up for grabs, one in each ward; of these seats, four were occupied by PP members, with the other two being occupied by independents, one of whom decided on running on the PP ticket. The PP attempted something similar with regard to keeping the electorate "in the dark", though all four of the party's commissioners whose term ended in December were expected to stand for re-election. Manyam was then disqualified, leaving just Oehlers, Chisty and Mak as the SLP's revealed candidates.

The SLP announced its full line-up for the election on 25 October; Nair was announced as one of the three remaining candidates, alongside M. P. D. Nair and E. V. Davies. He was to contest in the West Ward against incumbent Phyllis Eu Cheng Li of the PP, a schoolteacher who had placed third in the ward in the election in April and was thus elected on a six-month term as the first woman to hold public office in Singapore. Nair's candidacy was officially proposed by C. S. Rozario of the Department of Broadcasting Employees Union and seconded by Menon. At an election meeting held by the SLP at Farrer Park on 18 November, Nair proclaimed that he had decided to stand for election as he felt that "only a worker [could] put before the Commission the views of the worker." He claimed that the workers in Singapore were being "grossly neglected" by the "wealthy" sitting commissioners.

The SLP's campaign manager, Victor J. Mendis, claimed in mid-November that he was confident that the West Ward contest would see a "photo-finish", noting that Nair "[had] not had his capacity tested." He felt that the outcome of the race would rest on the "seriousness with which voters make their final decision." The Straits Times reported at the end of the month that observers believed that Eu had the "strongest chance" of all the incumbents standing for re-election. In the election, Nair came in second with 283 votes, with Eu being re-elected with 477. Both women in the election, Eu and Amy Laycock, also of the PP, won their seats with "convincing margins". Of the SLP's candidates, only Davies and Chisty won their seats, joining Pat Johnson, the SLP member elected in April. M. P. D. Nair, Mak also lost to PP incumbents while Oehlers lost to an independent. The Malaya Tribune reported that the supporters of both the SLP and the PP "appeared to be quite happy" with the outcome.

=== 1950 and 1951 elections ===
In early 1950, Thomas stepped down as SLP president and went on leave to England. At a party conference in June, Nair, Mendis, Majid, Johnson and Lim were nominated for election as president. However, Mendis, Nair and Johnson refused to stand for election and Majid withdrew his nomination at the last moment, leaving Lim to be elected president of the SLP unopposed. When Johnson was nominated for election as a vice-president, he walked out of the conference, proclaiming that he "[refused] to stand for any office at all in the Labour Party." He was followed by a crowd which included several prominent members of the party, including Mendis and Mak, and Nair, M. P. D. Nair, and G. Sarangapani were elected the vice-presidents after. Williams was then elected the secretary-general of the party. Historian Yeo Kim Wah retrospectively claimed that this was the result of Lim and Williams gathering their factions together to thwart a plot by Johnson and Mendis, leaders of their own faction, to elect themselves president and vice-president. Johnson, Mendis, Mak and their faction quit the party shortly after.

On 2 July, Nair announced at a public meeting of the SLP that the party would contest both the upcoming Municipal Commission and Legislative Council elections, to be held in December and April, respectively. In the Municipal Commission election, the SLP fielded candidates for all six wards, though only one, M. P. D. Nair in the South Ward, triumphed. Manyam had left the SLP for the PP and was elected in the North Ward, bringing the number of ACSU members on the commission to two. The Singapore Ratepayers' Association (SRA) soon queried the employment status of both Manyam and M. P. D. Nair, holding that, as employees of the War Department, they were paid employees of the Crown and thus were not eligible for a seat on the City Council. At the time, this was opposed by both Nair and Manyam, as well as their respective parties. The pair then pointed out that, as civilian employees of the War Department, they were instead governed by the department's Civilian Staff Regulations, and had been told they could run for seats on the City Council specifically.

In January, it was announced that Nair was expected to be selected as the SLP candidate for the Bukit Timah district in the Legislative Council election, alongside Lim, Williams, Chisty, Jaganathan and C. R. Dasaratha Raj in the Balestier, Rochore, Changi and Katong districts, respectively, alongside T. D. Richards and Noel Carter. His opponent in Bukit Timah would have been H. J. C. Kulasingha of the PP. The SLP announced the candidacy of Lim, Williams, Raj and Chisty on 28 January, with Nair and Jaganathan considered notable exceptions from the initial list. It was then revealed that Nair and Jaganathan could not run for a Legislative Council seat as they were both considered employees of the Crown. They announced that they "[had] not given up hope" of contesting the election and asked the Supervisor of Elections to clarify if the law applied to employees of the government of Singapore or of the United Kingdom. They argued that if the relevant legislation barred only the latter, they were still eligible to contest as they received payment from the United Kingdom Treasury as opposed to the local government.

==== City Council election ====
Lee Choon Eng, a close friend of Nair's with whom he formed a "rebel group" within the SLP.

Sometime in this period, Nair came together with Lee Choon Eng, a close friend of his who was also in the SLP, to form a "rebel group" within the party with the aim of increasing their chances of getting nominated as candidates in elections. He then applied to stand for election in the North Ward, considered an SLP stronghold for having elected both Johnson and Davies, in the upcoming election for the Municipal Commission, which was to be renamed the City Council, to be held on 1 December. However, A. P. Lazarous applied for the same ward, and the General Council selected Lazarous, who received six more votes than Nair. It was then announced that Lazarous, Lee Yong Min, P. R. Williams, N. A. K. Jothi and A. G. Peterson had been fielded in the North, East, Rochore, South and West Wards, respectively, with the candidate for the City Ward to be determined at a later date.

The day after, Nair claimed that he had been asked by members of the SLP who were against Lazarous's nomination to leave the SLP and form another party, to be known as the People's Party. He stated that he would not resign until he "knew more about" their opposition to Lazarous. On 29 September, Nair announced that he had sent in his letter of resignation as vice-president and member of the party's governing council, though he clarified that he would continue with the SLP as a member. He accused the General Council of conducting party affairs in a "most incapable biassed manner", and that he was "wasting [his] valuable time and energy" with the Council, which he believed suffered from "the canker of petty jealousy and the clash of personalities." The Straits Times reported in mid-October that there was a growing rift in the party between its "left" and "right" wings which was expected to come to a head at the next annual conference, scheduled for 28 October, and that this rift was a contributing factor to Nair's resignation.

The "rebel group", led by Nair and Lee Choon Eng, were expected to initiate a vote of no confidence in the General Council. However, on the day of the scheduled conference itself, the rebels occupied the ground floor of the party offices as a "five-man deputation" of the rebels engaged in a "four-hour parley" with the General Council, who met and negotiated in private on the top floor in a manner The Sunday Standard likened to the Kaesong talks. Eventually, it was decided that the conference would be postponed to 11 November and that Jothi would withdraw from the election, with Nair taking his place in the South Ward. On 3 November, M. P. D. Nair, who had been acting as president, resigned from the role. V. K. Nair was elected to succeed him in that capacity, and it was then revealed that Williams had never officially received his resignation as vice-president. Additionally, Lee was nominated to contest in the West Ward in place of Peterson. The conference was again postponed till sometime after the election such that the SLP could "put up a united front for the coming elections."

On 4 November, the PP announced at the last minute that Nair's opponent in the South Ward would be S. M. Vasagar, a merchant from Kampong Bahru. Like the SLP, the PP aimed to contest all six wards, and with Vasagar it had already announced candidates for all of them. The SLP ultimately did not contest the City Ward, leaving that a straight fight between a PP candidate and an independent. Nair's candidacy was officially proposed by Jaganathan and seconded by Wee Kiat Neo, a unionist who chaired the ACSU's women's section. In mid-November, Nair and Lee Choon Eng claimed that the printing of their posters and manifestos had been delayed by blackouts. Nair then announced his support for lawyer David Marshall's plan for "free legal service to the poor", which he and M. P. D. Nair would work to provide through branches of the SLP to be set up in the South Ward.

Nair proclaimed that he and the SLP stood for "social justice and social security" and claimed that only the SLP could "look after" the needs of the working class. He noted that he had lived in the East Ward was several years and claimed to be familiar with the problems faced by its residents. He pledged to push for a government subsidy to improve the "apalling conditions" of kampongs in the East Ward. At a rally in the South Ward for Vasagar, PP president C. C. Tan likened Vasagar and Nair to David and Goliath, respectively, and accused Nair of being a "political giant" who "put down" Jothi to "plant himself in the South Ward." Vasagar further claimed that Nair had only attained the post of SLP vice-president to run for public office. Nair responded to these accusations by claiming that he had stood for election "not for the glamour, but for the people." On 19 November, he alleged that his election meetings were being disrupted by "disorderly" audience members and requested that the police attend the rest of his election meetings such that they could be held in "peace".

In the election, Nair won the seat with 1,933 votes, ahead of Vasagar's 1,457. The SLP performed well overall, with three of the six seats going to the party, winning an election for the first and only time in its history. The three victorious SLP candidates, Nair, Lee Choon Eng and P. R. Williams, each triumphed over a PP candidate. The PP won two seats, with Chan Kum Chee and A. P. Rajah triumphing against Lee Yong Min and Lazarous, respectively. The City Ward went to an independent, H. A. Jivabhai, instead. With this election, the number of SLP councillors rose from three to six, while the PP and independent son the council decreased from 10 to nine and five to three, respectively. With the addition of Nair, Lee Choon Eng and P. R. Williams, the number of ACSU leaders on the council rose to five. Nair later claimed to have denied chairmanship of the SLP in this year, and Lim eventually resumed as the leader of the party.

== City Council ==
Five of the six SLP members on the newly reconstituted City Council on 5 December. From left to right are: M. P. D. Nair, Lee Choon Eng, V. K. Nair, E. V. Davies and P. R. Williams.

At the first meeting of the council following the election, held on 5 December, Nair was appointed to the Building and Establishment Committees, alongside Jivabhai, Chisty, Jee Ah Chian (nominated), Soh Ghee Soon (PP) and a to-be-determined nominated councillor in the former, and Davies, F. C. James (PP) and H. J. Rae (nominated) in the latter. He was also placed on the Examination Committee.

In mid-December, he called for a public inquiry into the operations of the Singapore General Hospital under Director of Medical Services W. J. Vickers. He had previously accused it of inefficiency and was dissatisfied with Vickers's claim that this was the fault of the "shortage" of staff and facilities, instead accusing Vickers of responding in a manner "typical of a bureaucrat trying to underrate the responsibility of citizens in criticising the administration for its failures." At the February 1952 meeting of the council, Nair suggested that a Whitley Council be set up to succeed the Services Committee, which was to be dissolved as it was found to be redundant to the Finance and General Purposes Committee. He introduced this proposal as an amendment to the motion calling for the committee's dissolution, though he withdrew this and stated that he would introduce a motion calling for a Whitley Council at a later date. The motion was moved and unanimously passed at the end of March.

At the end of June, Davies, the leader of the SLP on the council, initiated a motion calling for a fully elected City Council. However, Rajah, the PP's leader on the council, then put forth an amendment for the election of a mayor and the selection of six aldermen from those who had served on the council for three years, opining that this would allow for a "pool of experienced councillors who could be called to serve the city." Rajah's amendment faced heavy opposition from the SLP and the independents, who felt that this plan would heavily favour the PP. In response, Davies led a nine-member councillor walkout, being followed by the other SLP councillors, M. P. D. Nair and Manyam (now independents after being expelled by their respective parties), Jivabhai, J. M. Jumabhoy (independent) and K. Jagatheesan (independent). Chisty, Jumabhoy and Jivabhai went home while the rest, including Nair, returned to the meeting after the vote in time for adjournment speeches.

Rajah then continued to move the amendment, which passed with just six PP votes; the remaining councillors abstained. returned after the vote in time for adjournment speeches. Robertson opined that the walkout was "irresponsible." Typically, the amendment would have "become the substantive motion", but Rajah then had the amendment referred to a committee which was to look into the recommendations of a government expert's report. Nair then announced that he would move a vote of no confidence in City Council President T. P. F. McNeice for allowing Rajah's amendment. However, he criticised the suggestion that the SLP submit a memorandum to Governor John Nicoll on McNeice's conduct, arguing that this was a "silly idea."

=== SLP disputes ===
The annual conference was eventually scheduled for 23 March. However, on the day itself, while the "rebel group" led by Nair and Lee turned up to the conference, Nair himself was absent. The group moved a resolution calling for the adoption of a new party constitution to be deferred and referred to a Select Committee, and when this failed, they boycotted the rest of the conference. According to Yeo, Lim and Williams had again packed the conference, allowing for their re-election as president and general secretary, respectively, and the latter's success in amending the constitution to grant the General Council greater power, which eventually allowed him to exert greater influence over party affairs.

It was initially announced that the General Council would finalise the nominations for the election at a meeting on 9 August. However, Lim announced on 27 July that the council had already decided to nominate SLP general secretary Stevens over the incumbent Chisty for the Rochore Ward and Lee Yong Min in the East Ward. On 9 August, the General Council confirmed Lazarous as the candidate for the North Ward as the incumbent Davies and P. M. Williams over Jaganathan in the South Ward, though it had not yet determined candidates for the City and West Wards. The list of candidates was opposed by a "dissentient" group of the SLP, over 2,000 members strong, who disagreed with the selections of Lazarous, Williams and Stevens. This group felt that the General Council had been "prejudiced" in choosing to field Lazarous, Williams and Stevens and threatened a "mass resignation", calling for an emergency meeting on the matter.

Nair claimed that he had not been consulted on Williams's nomination, despite being the sole SLP councillor in the South Ward, and that he had been asked by supporters to support Lim in his "efforts to enforce discipline on the rank and file of the party", arguing that the latter should be granted a "fresh mandate". Davies then claimed that the General Council was ruled by a 'clique', Williams's faction, which "lacked the confidence of the electorate". He revealed that the SLP allowed non-British subjects as members, and alleged that the annual conference earlier in the year was a "farce" that had been staged in part through bringing a "few lorry loads" of non-local members to vote for preferred candidates through a "stupid" constitution. He accused this General Council of attempting to control its members on the Legislative and City Councils and of making "fantastic pronouncements" for the SLP as a whole.

A nine-member committee to represent 2,275 members of the SLP who disputed the selection was established. It submitted a memorandum to Lim on 20 August, stating that it "[could not] recognise the present Council as a valid body, nor can we accept decisions when it has so openly flouted the constitution, which it was elected to safeguard and honour". The committee gave Lim two weeks to organise a general meeting to "straighten out matters". Lim agreed to hold a meeting on 31 October, while the General Council worked to expel Lim as chair, declaring the meeting Lim called "unauthorised and unconstitutional." The Council was successful in this, and this led to another major split from the party, in addition to reportedly "[convincing] the public of the utter hideousness" of the SLP.

Over 800 members of the 'rebel' anti-Williams faction met at the Singapore Badminton Hall on 31 October and unanimously voted to express confidence in Lim as chair and to call for the resignation of Williams. An ad hoc committee comprising the sitting SLP councillors with the faction, including Dasaratha Raj, was formed. Thomas was named its convenor, and he accepted the post "reluctantly". Nair, Lee, Davies, Chisty and M. P. D. Nair all attended the meeting, with P. R. Williams being the only absent SLP councillor. Davies later claimed at a rally in support of Jaganathan, who contested the South Ward as an independent Labour candidate, that he, Nair and Lim had all recommended Jaganathan for the South Ward.

The SLP as a whole performed poorly in the election. Of the four candidates fielded, only Lazarous won his seat. Stevens and Lee Yong Min were defeated by PP candidates, and Jaganathan won against P. M. Williams. In contrast, the PP won four of the seats. S. K. Reddi, Lim's successor as president, blamed the performance on the party's "rank and file", though the Standard felt that it was rather the SLP's leaders who were largely responsible for the SLP's defeat.

=== Leader of independent group ===
S. Jaganathan, who was elected to the City Council as an 'Independent Labour' candidate in 1952.

On 9 December, the General Council held a meeting to appoint a successor to Davies as SLP leader on the City Council. Nair and Lee Choon Eng suggested that a leader be elected by the Parliamentary Committee, which Williams rejected. P. R. Williams was then appointed the leader, after which both Nair and Lee walked out. Two days after, Nair, Lee, M. P. D. Nair and Jaganathan met to form a "Labour group" on the City Council independent of the SLP. Nair was appointed the leader of this group.

On the 12 December meeting of the Council, the two Labour groups "clashed" over the allocation of councillors to the various committees. When enquired about the status of the new "Labour group", McNeice clarified that any group formed within the council would be recognised regardless of its official registration status. M. P. D. Nair asked if V. K. Nair and P. R. Williams could swap committee placements. Though Williams challenged this by pointing out that V. K. Nair had previously approved the allocation, the council approved the swap. V. K. Nair then proposed that Lee give up his seat on the Assessment Committee in favour of Lazarous's seat on the Health Committee, and this, too, was passed by the council. Nair was also appointed to the Finances and General Purposes Committee, chaired by Rajah and alongside Jumabhoy, Chan Kum Chee (PP), C. F. Smith (nominated) and Yap Pheng Geck (nominated), the Vehicles and Traffic Committee, alongside P. R. Williams, Manyam, James, F. L. Lane (nominated) and S. F. Ho (nominated), and the Elections Reform Machinery Committee, on which he advocated for 27 separate Wards in the City Council elections to facilitate a fully-elected Council.

At the start of 1953, Stevens announced that the SLP was to issue new "fool-proof" membership cards as part of its reorganisation effort, and that even members who had been expelled would be eligible to apply for them. The anti-Williams rebel faction of the SLP refused to recognise the General Council's actions as legitimate, and thus "[did] not find any reason for renewing [their] membership" under this scheme. A nine-member interim committee headed by Nair was to pursue the possibility of settling the dispute in court. This committee asked that members of the party avoid re-registering and paying their annual subscription to the General Council, accusing the council of going against the party's constitution and "adopting an autocratic attitude" in its governance. Jaganathan, the committee's secretary, alleged that the members had already paid their subscription in the middle of 1952 and suggested that the General Council had attempted to collect "double fees".

In this period, a delegation of the Labour Party in the United Kingdom, led by Saul Rose, a scholar who was then the party's International Secretary, visited Singapore. They met with the General Council and the anti-Williams rebel faction, eventually recommending that Lim's expulsion be rescinded and that Lim return the records which the council alleged he had taken with him. They also recommended that the "Labour group" on the City Council be taken "back to the fold" of the SLP. The General Council agreed to rescind Lim's expulsion but "expressed [themselves]" against the proposal to reconcile with the "Labour group".

Nair was appointed to the Labour sub-committee of the City Council, alongside Jumabhoy and Yap. The sub-committee negotiated with the Singapore Federation of City Council Labour Unions, which had delivered the council a 14-day ultimatum to accept its demands on the pay and working conditions of employees of the council. The "Labour group" then submitted a proposal for meeting the union's demands to the sub-committee. As a member of the sub-committee, he promised to oppose any proposal to reduce Sunday double wages for City Council workers. In April, he was appointed to a working committee chaired by Deputy City President J. T. Rea which was to oversee the implementation of an elected Mayor of Singapore, alongside Chan and City Council secretary T. M. Stevens; this later grew to include Rajah. The group issued a 12-point statement on a proposed Mayor on 12 May pledging to initiate a vote of no confidence if they felt that the Mayor was acting "prejudicial to the interest of the council." As a City Councillor, he received the Queen Elizabeth II Coronation Medal in June.

In mid-July, Reddi claimed that party membership had fallen to just around 300, down from the thousands which it had previously claimed, which the Indian Daily Mail still considered doubtful. Several former leaders of the party had opined that the SLP was "long since dead or on the point of dying." The Daily Mail itself declared the party to be "of no use to the Colony." Reddi officially resigned on 21 July, opining that the party's situation was now "hopeless and intolerable" and that it had "ceased to exist as a coherent body in anything but name." He accused P. M. Williams of dominating party affairs through his factioners on the General Council, who outvoted Reddi on "every worthwhile issue" and prevented the party from achieving any meaningful progress. Nair then stated that there were still some within the party capable of "[pulling it] out of the present mess." On 25 July, the General Council elected T. D. Richards to succeed Reddi as the party chair.

At the annual conference of the SLP, held in September, Nair moved a resolution calling for the reinstating of all expelled members of the party, including M. P. D. Nair, Lim and Jaganathan, who had been expelled for running as an independent against Williams. This was debated for over an hour, though ultimately only two voted in favour of this: Nair and the motion's seconder. Attempts to have all members of the General Council step down and make way for "fresh blood" also failed.

==== Vehicles and Traffic Committee ====
Nair was either the chairman or the vice-chairman of the Vehicles and Traffic Committee. He also advocated for increasing the limit on the number of second class taxis allowed to operate in Singapore, believing this to be the only way to counter the rise of pirate taxis. In November 1956, he initiated a motion calling for the complete abolition on the taxi limit, though this failed. He also pushed for delimiting trishaws. Nair opposed the mandatory installation of meters in taxis, which he felt were expensive and would thus lead to higher taxi fares. McNeice then made an arrangement with the Registry of Vehicles which the committee interpreted as a rquirement for taxi drivers to install meters by January 1954. However, this led to a "desperate situation" where over 1,400 drivers had yet to install them by late December 1953 as they were too costly. Nair then advocated for them to be given another six months. However, McNeice later claimed that this was the result of a misunderstanding of his arrangement.

With the committee, he argued against the promotion of London-type taxis in favour of the standard four-door taxis which had been the standard in Singapore, siding with the Singapore Hire Car Association on the matter. In May 1953, Nair "came across" a failed resolution M. P. D. Nair had initiated two years prior calling for the institution of a smoking ban in buses as had been introduced in India. Finding smoking in buses to be "obnoxious" and "nauseating", he raised the matter with the committee, and it narrowly passed three to two. Nair argued that, with this, a "relic of old colonialism was swept away." The Singapore Free Press commented that the ban would likely prove controversial, though the committee's actions demonstrated a "commendable interest in Singapore's bus problems." Nair also attempted to resolve the parking shortage, considered the "No. 1 traffic problem" in Singapore. In June, Nair proposed that a parking platform with a capacity for 350 be erected above the car park at the Clifford Pier. However, as this was to cost $1,000,000, the rest of the council decided that it would be too costly.

In July, Nair was appointed to a committee which was to consider transferring the council's traffic powers to the government, alongside Rea and James. At the end of the month, Nair, Rea and Jee were nominated the council's representatives on a survey team which was to decide on the locations of petrol stations. In August, a sub-committee comprising Nair and James was set up to deliberate having the council do away with its responsibilities as a highway authority, with several councillors being against the council bearing the costs of the "traffic baby". At the start of October, Nair proclaimed his opposition to the transfer of the council's highway authority powers, arguing that this might result in a "clash with the policies of certain City departments." The Straits Times reported in March 1956 that Nair had accused the Safety First Council, the Automobile Association and other groups of "trying to pull a fast one" by advocating for the transfer and likened it to the existence of the now abolished nominated City Council members.

Nair made various proposals aimed at relieving traffic congestion. He proposed that $96,000 be spent on converting the junction of Orchard Road, Paterson Road and Scotts Road in an effort to solve the "acute congestion" there. This was rejected, after which he began advocating for the installation of traffic lights at the junction. He believed that introducing double-decker buses in Singapore would help, though he decided against introducing them as he felt that the public was "not keen" on them. In August, suggested that Stamford Road be converted into a one-way street leaidng to the city centre, though this was rejected by the rest of a committee, after which he proposed that Stamford Road and Bras Basah Road both be converted to one-way roads to form a "North-South loop", complementing the existing East-West loop. This was complicated by existing Singapore Traction Company trolleybus routes, which would have to be altered. The councillors could not come to an agreement on this at the meeting at the end of the month. By September, this proposal had evolved to include Coleman Street, Canning Rise and parts of Orchard Road, while the Stamford Road front had been reduced to just part of the street. This was to result in Stamford Road and Fort Canning Road forming a "one-way loop".

In mid-November, the committee approved the North-South loop scheme, after which it was to be put before the council. This was to see Stamford Road and the stretch of Bras Basah Road from Victoria Street to Dhoby Ghaut be made one-way and the rerouting of trolleybuses on the latter street, costing $18,000. A petition signed by 29 shopkeepers on Stamford Road was then sent to Jumabhoy in protest, though he noted that this had been sent "too late" and Nair stated that the committee would press on with the scheme. In January 1954, Nair announced that work on the loop would begin as soon as the Governor-in-Council approved the plans. However, in July, it was announced that the project as a whole had been scrapped as the government felt that the timing was "unfavourable" and the council had come to view the cost of the plans as "not practical." Nair commented that the scheme was now in the "melting pot."

=== Singapore Socialist Party ===
On 3 November 1953, 700 people, mostly those who had been a part of the anti-Williams faction, met at the Victoria Memorial Hall to form a new political party, tentatively named the Democratic Labour Party, which was to "uphold the principles of democratic socialism." Nair attended this, alongside Lim, M. P. D. Nair and Jaganathan. Thomas, the meeting's chair, was elected the chair of the drafting committee. Nair, Jaganathan and Alex Josey were proposed for a seat on the committee, though all three declined to be nominated.

The Democratic Labour Party did not participate in the City Council election held on 5 December, in which the SLP fielded just one candidate, Manyam in the North Ward, who was defeated by a PP candidate. The PP won three wards, including the South Ward, after having elected Labour councillors in Nair and Jaganathan for the past two elections, increasing the number of PP councillors by one, with the rest going to independents. M. P. D. Nair, whose term was set to expire, chose not to seek re-election. The election also saw the debut of the United Malays National Organisation (UMNO), which fielded just two candidates, both of whom lost. Nair criticised UMNO for its communalism, believing that the promotion of such an ideology would only damage the local labour movement. By the end of the year, the Labour group on the City Council had reportedly come to include P. R. Williams, Lazarous and the newly elected Mak (independent Labour).

Around this period, Mendis, who had gone on a hiatus from local politics after splitting from the SLP, rejoined the party as part of the SLP's efforts to regain several of its former members, and became once again a leader of a faction, in addition to eventually succeeding E. S. Moorthy as secretary alongside C. H. Koh. Nair had aligned himself with this faction by early February. He then invited David Marshall to join this faction, though the latter declined, already being heavily involved in the Democratic Labour Party after agreeing to join Lim and Thomas in late 1953. On 1 May 1954, Thomas and Lim, alongside other former SLP members such as Jaganathan and M. P. D. Nair, officially founded their party as the Singapore Socialist Party (SSP). Richards's successor as SLP chair V. P. Abdullah accused the SSP of being "neither Socialists nor democrats" and attempting to capitalise on the "goodwill" of the working class towards the local labour movement.

In March 1954, Nair was among the councillors arguing that the elections that year should be postponed while Singapore's governance was being reviewed by the Rendel Commission. It was then expected that the commission might recommend a City Council and an Island Council and that its proposals might be implemented sometime the following year, and that yet another election might have to be held earlier in 1955. Nair argued that candidates "could not afford" this and "intervening period machinery" should be set up to introduce the recommendations. At the next meeting, it was proposed that the council be composed of 24 elected members and eight aldermen that did not belong to any party. Nair opposed this in favour of a fully elected council, arguing that it "[interfered] with the true principles of democracy", though it passed nonetheless, with all Labour councillors abstaining from voting on the qualifications of the aldermen. The council also passed a motion calling for a Mayor to be elected entirely by councillors instead of the public.

On 19 July, 10,000 City Council workers went on strike for the third time. This was called by the 11 unions under the City Council Labour Unions Federation over a dispute regarding the date at which their back pay, according to the findings of the Ritson Commission on the pay of civil servants, was to begin after meetings with the Labour Sub-committee held the day before ended in a "deadlock". Jaganathan then convened a meeting of the Labour group to discuss a strike. In response to the strike, the council's Emergency Committee threatened to hire thousands of contract workers in an attempt to break the strike. This committee then met with the Finance Committee and the Labour Sub-committee to discuss the matter. Ahead of the City Council meeting at the end of the month, the Labour group announced that they would move a resolution calling for the implementation of the unions' demands regarding back pay and threatening to stage a walkout if this failed. They would then boycott "all Council proceedings" until the strike had concluded. The strike ended at the end of the month after the City Council accepted a compromise from the unions. He was later appointed to a sub-committee which was to award ex gratia payments to employees who had worked during the strike after Lee noted that there was no Labour councillor on the sub-committee.

Nair successfully pushed for a stay in the demolition of the Palmer Road Shanty Town at the end of September. In October, he was appointed to a sub-committee which was to look into the recommendations of the Ritson Commission for City Council employees, alongside Rajah, Smith and George Oehlers (nominated). He was appointed to succeed Rajah on the council's Mayoral Sub-committee in January 1955, which had been formed on the expectation that there would soon be elections held for the City Council and an Island Council, such that there would be a Labour councillor on the body, which had Chan and Smith as its other members. In March, he was appointed to a sub-committee which was to oversee the conferrment of Freedom of the City of Singapore to Nicoll on the latter's retirement, alongside Yap, Chan and Lane. Two months after, he was among the councillors advocating for Malcolm MacDonald, the Commissioner-General of Southeast Asia, to be bestowed the same honour. He was appointed to the council's staff sub-committee.

=== Labour Front ===
Logo of the Labour Front.

Despite the SLP's previous stance on the SSP, the former party announced that it would be merging with the SSP to form the Labour Front (LF) on 21 August. Three delegates from each party were placed on a committee with "over-all powers". The SLP's representatives on the committee were Abdullah, as well as Mendis and Koh, who would later be appointed co-governors of the LF with Thomas. It was decided that both the SLP and SSP would cease their independent activities and be merged completely by 1 July of the following year.

However, the candidates nominated by the LF for the 1955 Legislative Council election, to be held on 2 April, drew criticism from the SLP, which considered the list of candidates "injudicious" as it included several who had been members of neither the SLP nor the SSP. The situation worsened when an executive of the LF drew up a constitution and applied to officially register the LF as a political party, with the SLP wing now alleging that the LF had been established only as an "ad-hoc committee" to ensure that the SLP and SSP did not "step on each other's toes" in the upcoming election, and that the LF had now "overstepped its mandate" by registering the LF, thus implying the "dissolution" of both the SLP and the SSP. The dispute culminated in the SLP General Council voting in early November to withdraw from the LF, demanding that Koh and Mendis resign their seats on the LF's governing committee. The Straits Times viewed this as the "death" of the SLP. The General Council eventually voted to expel both Mendis and Koh. The SLP would only field one candidate in the 1955 election, and it did not contest in any further elections.

In October 1954, Singapore Regional Indian Congress (SRIC), the Singapore branch of the Malayan Indian Congress, issued a circular claiming that it would ask both Nair and M. P. D. Nair to contest the 1955 election on the SRIC ticket, and that it was hoped that they would run in the Whampoa and Seletar Divisions, respectively. The Straits Times reported that several within the local Indian community believed that the SRIC "[stood] little or no chance" in the election, though others felt that it was possible that the party could "succeed" if it merged with the Malayan Union (KMS) and the LF. In the 1955 election, the LF won 10 of the 25 seats in a major upset, coming into power with Marshall becoming the first Chief Minister of Singapore. Through its alliances with the local UMNO and the Malayan Chinese Association, it was able to form a slim majority on the Legislative Assembly. That election saw the election of several City Councillors, including Lee, Mak, Lazarous, Jumabhoy and M. P. D. Nair to the Legislative Assembly, the first four on the LF ticket and the last as an Independent Labour candidate.

By late May 1955, Nair was going as an Independent Labour councillor, and he then praised the LF's decision to decentralise the City Council and Singapore Rural Board, thereby "scrapping" the recommendations of the Rendel Commission. A proponent of decentralisation, he believed that this would allow for more people to "participate in local government." At the council meeting at the end of the month, Nair began officially going as an LF councillor. The City Council employees again went on strike in August and Nair was appointed a representative of the City Council in negotiations with the City Council unions, alongside Yap, Rajah, Smith, Chan and Deputy City President Richard Middleton-Smith.

In March 1956, Nair was appointed by the Finances and General Purposes Committee to represent the City Council on the Malayanisation Commission, which was also conducting a review of Singapore's governance to facilitate Malayanisation as part of the increased push for self-governance under the LF, alongside Rajah and C. J. Poh (nominated). They had been selected such that there would be one to represent the LF, one to represent the PP and another to represent the nominated councillors, though the PP had by this point recently merged with the Democratic Party to form the Liberal Socialist Party (LSP). Their appointments were to be voted on by the City Council as a whole at the meeting at the end of the month.

However, Sim Beng Seng (LSP) challenged the right of all three to represent the council. Sim claimed that he was "not aware of any decision to this effect made by the full body of City Councillors, and Nair was told by the commission's chair, B. R. Sreenivasan, to do away with the sectioning of the council, opining that it shouldn't "act in three different parts." Sim claimed to be fighting on behalf of local officers, arguing that the representatives could not be nominated members of the council and that they could not be taken from the Finance or Estabilshments Committees, the latter of which Poh was on, as the committees were "prejudiced" as they had lowered qualification requirements for expatriates and done the opposite for locals. A representative of local officers then proclaimed that at "no point [had] we invited Mr. Sim to fight our case for us." All three were ultimately confirmed as the council's representatives. By the end of August, Nair had become the LF's leader on the City Council.

On 29 May 1957, Nair embarked on a month-long "goodwill tour" of the United Kingdom sponsored by the Colonial Office in Malaya, alongside Ahmad Dhaffir of the Singapore Rural Board, Peter Regis of the Education Department in Jesselton and Federal Legislative Councillors Engku Muhsein Abdul Kadir and Abdul Ghafar Baba of Terengganu and Malacca, respectively.

==== Eligibility and 1957 election ====
On 21 December, Rea, now the City Council President, stated that there was "legal doubt" as to whether workers in the armed services could sit on the City Council. This was in response to Lee's accusing Rea of "summarily declaring his seat vacant" after he had seconded Nair's motion, which was to call for the council to revoke the approval it had granted Loke Wan Tho to erect a cinema in Katong. Rea asked for the matter to be clarified, and it was believed that this would disqualify six members of the City Council, Lee and Nair included. It was decided in early January 1957 that, while their right to sit on the council remained in question, they would be allowed to continue as councillors until the next election.

With the implementation some of the recommendations of the Rendel Commission and another commission that reviewed local governance, the McNeice Commission, the election was scheduled for 21 December 1957. There were now to be 32 seats for a fully elected City Council without nominated members. In this period, Marshall had split from the LF after resigning as Chief Minister in mid-1956, being replaced in the post by Lim. Shortly before the election, he formed the Workers' Party (WP). In mid-November, it was believed that the Nair, Sim and Jivabhai were among the 13 candidates that the LF was expected to field. The People's Action Party (PAP) was expected to field another 13 and UMNO four. Other parties that were to contest in the election included the MCA and KMS, allied with UMNO and, collectively, with the PAP for the election. All parties had chosen not to reveal their candidates by that point as part of their strategy for the election and as their roster remained uncertain.

By the 1957 election, there were three remaining City Councillors who were concurrently employees of the War Department: Nair, Jaganathan and Wee of the ACSU, a nominated member previously under the LF who had left and joined the WP and was expected to be fielded by the latter party. There were then "high-level discussions" on whether section 22 of the newly implemented Local Government Elections Ordinance, which specified that those holding "office of emolument under the crown or local authority [could not] contest the polls", disqualified them from participating in the election. It was reported that if Attorney-General Ernest Pattison Shanks did not give a "firm ruling" on the matter by 17 November, all War Department employees seeking nomination would have to withdraw. However, Shanks commented that he did not wish to rule on this.

Nair and Jaganathan both announced that they had decided against standing for re-election, though they continued to support an amendment to the ordinance such as to allow War Department employees to stand for election. Jaganathan had done so due to ill health and Nair stated that he saw "no point" in quitting from his post in the War Department. He claimed that he had previously asked the LF to consider an amendment and that this had been deemed "not necessary." However, The Singapore Free Press reported the day after that Nair still planned pushing through with seeking re-election despite the legal ambiguity, and that he was expected to be followed by several other War Department workers across various parties, which had been put in a "tight spot" over the issue. However, he eventually settled on not standing for re-election, delivering his final speech in the City Council on 17 December alongside Rajah, who had also then decided to retire from politics. In the election, the PAP won the most seats with 13, followed by the LSP with seven, the WP and the LF with four each, UMNO with two and the two independents.

At a session of the Legislative Assembly in mid-July 1958, Abdul Hamid Jumat (UMNO) proposed a Bill seeking to explicitly clarify that workers in the armed services were eligible to stand for election. This was seconded by Lee Choon Eng, who opined that it was very likely that Jaganathan and Nair would both have stood for re-election had they not been barred from doing so, calling Nair a "good public-spirited man" that the City Council had "lost" through this. Lee argued that, with there being numerous armed services employees who had hoped to stand for election in December, an interpretation of the law which allowed them to contest might have resulted in an "entirely different composition" than that which had arisen from the election, and that it "may not have given the P.A.P. the big majority that it [had that day]."

=== Post-City Council activities ===
In the year following, he was among the former City Councillors such as Chan and M. P. D. Nair who spoke out against Mayor of Singapore Ong Eng Guan's (PAP) criticisms of the City Council. He expressed support for the report of the By-election Conduct Commission, which claimed to have found evidence that several candidates in the 1957 Legislative Assembly by-elections, including PAP leader Lee Kuan Yew, had received the aid of secret socities in their campaigns. In December, as the vice-president of the SWU, he expressed his support for Lim, who was now the president of the newly founded Singapore People's Alliance after also having split from the LF, opining that the latter "would not let down the trade union movement and genuine trade unionists." He claimed then that he was no longer affiliated with any political party.

== Personal life and death ==
Nair married Sreemathi Seetha Devi, with whom he had 11 children. The family lived on 10 Balmoral Road in the mid-1950s before moving to Jalan Tua Kong in Siglap by 1963. His eldest daughter, Susheila Nair, became engaged to M. P. D. Nair in 1956 and married him in Janaury 1957. He was a member of the local branch of the Rotary Club and the president of the Singapore Malayalee Young Men's Association. Nair was appointed a Justice of the Peace in 1958 and later became the chair of the Board of Visiting Justices of the Peace to the Reformatory Training Centre. He was elected the president of the Army Civilian Officers' Association in 1959. In 1963, he was elected a trustee of the Malayali Hindu Samajam and the chair of its building committee. He was also an outspoken supporter of the Aikya Kerala Movement to form a united Kerala state for the Malayalis.

Nair officially retired by 1969. He died on 7 January 1974. A prayer was held at the Sri Sivan Temple on Orchard Road on 22 January.
