= S. S. Manyam =

Singaporean politician (1912/1913–1955)

Manyam in about 1950.

Shunmugh Subra Manyam (1912 or 1913 – 4 June 1955) was a Singaporean politician and union leader who served on the Municipal Commission of Singapore and then on the City Council of Singapore, and as the president of the Army Civil Services Union, the Singapore Federation of Services Unions and briefly, the Labour Party of Singapore.

Manyam was a prominent figure in the Army Civil Services Union, being elected its president in 1948 and continuing to serve in that post until he narrowly lost re-election in 1950. He ran for it again in 1951 and lost by a single vote to M. P. D. Nair, with whom he frequently clashed, after which he was elected the vice-president. He was also the head of the Singapore Federation of Services Unions, though he resigned in 1952 after objecting to an agreement accepted by the leaders of its constituent unions.

A founder of the Labour Party, he served briefly as the party's interim secretary before it was officially registered in late 1948. He was initially to contest the Municipal Commission election in December 1949, though he withdrew when it was found that he was not on the electoral register and would thus be disqualified if he followed through. He then broke with the party and joined the Progressive Party in the first half of 1950.

As a Progressive candidate, he won the North Ward seat, considered a Labour Party stronghold, in the 1950 election. His victory was attributed to his influence within the labour movement and the overconfidence of the Labour Party in the ward. On the Municipal Commission, Manyam advocated for increased wages and better working conditions for employees of the Municipality, as well as for the establishment of community centres. However, he often disagreed with other Progressives on the commission, later the City Council, culminating in his resignation from the party in late 1951.

After leaving the Progressives, Manyam briefly attempted to form a party of his own before continuing as an independent. Before the 1953 election, he rejoined the Labour Party at a time when it had already suffered severely from infighting and lost many of its members. He unsuccessfully contested that election as the only official Labour candidate. In January 1955, he was elected the president of the Labour Party, serving in that post until his death several months later. He was the party's last president.

== Early life and career ==
Manyam was born in the city of Jaffna in British Ceylon in the early 1910s. He came to Malaya in 1929 as a 13 year old on his own as his parents remained in Jaffna. He first went to Kuala Lumpur, where he took his Senior Cambridge Examinations as a private student, after which he came to Singapore. Manyam spent three years as a teacher. During the Japanese Occupation, which lasted from 1942 to 1945, Manyam made a living as a hawker selling coconut water. After the occupation, he joined the War Department as a Special Grade Clerk, eventually rising to the position of chief clerk at the HQ and Control Accounts Section, which he claimed was the "highest grade" a civilian could attain within the department, by the end of the decade. He was also member of the Panel of the Industrial Court. He later began freelancing as a journalist.

== Union work ==
=== ACSU ===
While at the War Department, Manyam joined the War Department Civil Staff Association. At its first general meeting of 1947, held in March, he was elected to its governing council, under V. K. Nair as president, V. S. Phillips as vice-president and M. P. D. Nair as honorary secretary. He then became a member of the Army Civil Services Union (ACSU). At a general meeting of the ACSU on 20 July 1947, he was elected the union's honorary general secretary, under V. K. Nair as president and Lee Choon Eng and M. P. D. Nair as the vice-presidents. He then viewed the union, which represented 5,000 clerks of the department at the time, as having been formed out of a "dire need for collective bargaining and co-ordinated action" among employees of the department.

==== Tenure as president ====
By April 1948, he had succeeded V. K. Nair as the ACSU's president. He then proclaimed that the labour movement in Singapore had yet to move "[past] the talking stage because the local authorities [had] chosen to turn a deaf ear to [their] problems." He then felt that a strike called by the ACSU was "long overdue", though they would attempt to obtain the right to strike from the government before doing so. The union then reportedly had about 270 members. At a talk in May, Manyam proclaimed that the reason the local labour movement's progress had thus far been "unsteady" was that the unions had failed to put up a "united front strong enough to effect any substantial improvement", instead relying on the support of the "alien" government.

At the end of May, Manyam announced that the ACSU would be forming a union to represent the over 10,000 manual workers of the War Department, to be known as the Army Industrial Workers' Union. The new union was to operate independently of the ACSU, which would serve as advisers only in an unofficial capacity. Manyam was recognised as its organiser. The union was formed in late July, becoming the first labour union to be established in Singapore following the imposition of the Emergency Regulations in June as part of the Malayan Emergency. He proclaimed that the union was to be "strictly non-Communist" and that it would thus be unaffiliated with the Singapore Federation of Trade Unions. He opined in September that the department actively sought to improve working conditions and was "willing to meet the union half-way."

Manyam and ACSU general secretary P. M. Williams, his brother-in-law, sent a memorandum to the Governor-in-Council, complaining that the War Department had "openly refused" to consult the union on "members vitally concerning the members." The memorandum contained 24 requests, including full recognition of the union and a 36-hour work week. A spokesperson for the Army then responded, stating that the claims made in the memorandum was "absurd" and "factually untrue", and that the Army had previously told the union that "a solution would take a long time." At a meeting on 1 December, Manyam opined that the ACSU was now the "strongest trade union in Malaya" and supported the formation of the union's women's section, of which Wee Kiat Neo was appointed founding chair. On 9 December, the War Department officially responded to the memorandum, stating that it did not recognise the ACSU. Manyam was "puzzled" by this, claiming that the union was already recognised as a trade union in Singapore, and decided to write to the Labour Department, seeking "clarification" on its status.

The ACSU held its conference in early February 1949, at which it was decided that the union should also represent the manual workers of the War Department instead of relegating them to a separate union. Manyam was re-elected the president, S. Sankaran the vice president and Piara Singh the general secretary. Two days after, the ACSU was notified that the War Office had given the local War Department the authority to officially recognise the union. In May, Manyam claimed that he had received letters from members and branches of the union "hinting at strike action" unless the War Department did not quicken in revising salaries. He told the ACSU's members that he hoped that they would "force" the union into a course of action that would "strain the good relations" between the department and the union.

In May, the ACSU served the War Department a one-month notice asking for salary revisions and the introduction of a 60% "cost-of-living allowance". If the department did not meet the demands by the deadline, the union would call a meeting to determine a further course of action. At the start of June, the department agreed to revise the workers' salaries, though Manyam stated that the ACSU was "not satisfied" with the changes. The union found that the pay rises were generally "very low", with certain categories facing cuts instead and others being "entirely neglected." A delegation of three, comprising Manyam, Sankaran and M. K. Nair, met with the Brigadier in Charge of Administration and told him that while the ACSU was prepared to accept the revision, it would only do so "under protest and subject to certain conditions." The Army then agreed to pay $2,000,000 in arrears with the revised salaries and to have the dispute referred to the War Office. Manyam stated that there were no plans then for a mass meeting.

Still unsatisfied with the salary revisions, as well as the lack of "security of service" in the War Department, the ACSU sent a letter to the British Parliament in early July asking that the working conditions of the Imperial Defence Departments be investigated. The threat of calling a 'Mass Protest Meeting' for the union returned. However, by January, "certain factors" had come up that were believed to stand a chance a "[neutralising] the pent-up feelings" of the department's employees, including the arrival of a Civilian Administrative Officer from the United Kingdom who had set up a local office. It was hoped that this officer would "deal with the administration of Army civilians." Manyam later explained that the lack of a mass protest meeting was due to the fact that they "[did] not wish to disrupt or even weaken the programmes" of the War Department as they were "cognisant of [their] responsibilities as citizens", hoping to instead resolve the dispute peacefully.

At the ACSU's Third Annual Delegates Conference in early February, Manyam stood for re-election as president and narrowly lost to V. K. Nair; Manyam had received 49 and Nair 50. In his address, Manyam stated that the Executive Council of the union would have to "guard against the go-easy policy adopted during the past few months in discussing matters relating to the Union." He then told the local press he intended to leave for the United Kingdom to study law soon, though he did not ultimately follow through with this. The Malaya Tribune reported that, under his tenure, membership of the ACSU rose from 270 to either 6,000 or 15,000. He was also credited with having played an important role in bringing the "plight of civilian defence service workers" to the notice of the War Office and the local government.

==== 1951 conference ====
At the 1951 Delegates Conference of the ACSU, held on 18 March and attended by 109 delegates, Manyam, now also a Municipal Commissioner, was one of five candidates nominated to run for president. M. P. D. Nair, also a Municipal Commissioner, announced his withdrawal from the race, stating that he "could not do full justice" to the post of president while serving simultaneously as a commissioner. He was followed in this by D. Stevens and Khng Jit Cheng. However, Manyam charged Nair with "not having the interests of the Union at heart" by withdrawing, and so Nair chose to remain in the race. V. K. Nair then withdrew, leaving the election a straight fight between Manyam and M. P. D. Nair. A letter to the Singapore Standard later remarked that this was because Manyam saw Nair as his "favourite opponent". In the first ballot, Manyam and Nair tied at 54 votes each, with one spoiled vote. In the second ballot, the remaining vote went to Nair, who was named President of the ACSU. Both rounds were a secret ballot. Manyam was instead elected a vice-president, alongside V. K. Nair.

M. P. D. Nair's victory proved controversial with much of the union, as he had only been nominated for election as president by two of the 19 branches of the ACSU. In contrast, the largest 11 branches had all nominated Manyam instead. In the days following, 12 branches, including all which nominated Manyam for president, declared that they were "dissatisfied" with the outcome of the election and demanded that a Special Delegates Conference be held soon. The Kranji Branch quickly organised a petition demanding that the officeholders be re-elected, declaring that it had "no confidence" in its delegates and leadership as they had reportedly voted against Manyam. The members of the Alexandra Branch had called on its president and secretary to step down. It was expected that a resolution calling for officeholders to be elected at general meetings, as opposed to Delegates Conferences, at the next meeting of the union.

Manyam claimed on 21 March that the petition had already been endorsed by 400 members at Kranji and was expected to be endorsed soon by another 50 more. He alleged that the outcome of the conference was "irregular and based on communal lines." He supported the call for a special conference, opining that failing to hold this soon would "break up the unity and solidarity of the union". P. M. Williams stated that the election had been fair and properly conducted, and Nair responded to the backlash by accusing the 12 branches of "hatching a plot" against the ACSU. Manyam then claimed that, on the announcement of the results, two branches had protested against Nair's victory, and that these protests had been "stifled" by the conference's chairman, V. K. Nair, and clarified that his attack on communalism was not directed at any particular ethnic group. A member of the union later recalled that the disputes and "clash of personalities" between Nair and Manyam were frequently regarded as the "main clash" within the ACSU and that "important" resolutions which had been tabled for that conference were "thrown out" as a result of the dispute.

==== Vice-presidency ====
The negotiations between the ACSU delegation and Charles Keightley, with the ACSU delegates' backs turned to the camera. Of them, Manyam is the third from the left.

The ACSU decided on 16 June to send a delegation to meet with Charles Keightley, the Commander-in-Chief of the Far East Land Forces, to settle the dispute over salary revision, the provision of an allowance and other "outstanding claims." Manyam was appointed to the delegation as the union's vice-president, alongside M. P. D. Nair, then acting general secretary Chew Seng, treasurer Wong Fook Lim, H. A. Ismail, D. N. A. Taylor, and Wee as the women's section's chair. The delegation negotiated with Keightley, as well as Chief of Staff J. H. N. Poett and Command Secretary E. H. Everson, in July.

By December 1951, Manyam was now one of five ACSU members who had been elected to the City Council of Singapore. They were accused of having used the union as a "stepping stone" to get into public office. He denied the accusation, though he announced that he would move a resolution at the next delegates conference of the union which would bar ACSU members on the council from running for concurrently holding office in the union, believing it impossible for one to "do justice" to both posts at once. These five came to be known as the "Big Five" and were accused of having entered politics "for their own cause and glory" and of using the ACSU as a "political pawn", though supporters opined that they had performed well as union leaders despite their positions on the City Council. Manyam defended himself and his fellow ACSU councillors by claiming that they were among the most regular attendees of council or committee meetings, and that they did so "at loss of salary for time taken for [their] W.D. duties."

In mid-February 1952, it was announced that Manyam would be among the seven members of the ACSU who would run for president, alongside M. P. D. Nair and V. K. Nair, at the union's conference, to be held on 9 March. In early March, however, Manyam wrote to the union's secretary proclaiming that he would not accept nomination to any office in the union as a City Councillor. It was then expected that the various branches were preparing to advance "many" resolutions barring members on the City Council of Legislative Council from holding office in the union. M. P. D. Nair then announced during the conference itself that, contrary to what they had previously stated, none of the City Councillors who held office in the ACSU would be running for re-election, with M. P. D. Nair, V. K. Nair, Manyam and Lee withdrawing their names from the nomination list. However, none of the resolutions which sought to bar them from running in the first place were passed.

In 1955, P. R. Williams, Williams's brother and Manyam's brother-in-law, who was serving as a City Councillor and as the ACSU's secretary, decided that he would be stepping down from the latter post and handing it over to Manyam, who was to assume the position on 6 June. However, Manyam died just days before that.

=== Trade union congress ===
In mid-1949, it was proposed that a Central Malayan Trade Union Congress, modelled after the Trades Union Congress in the United Kingdom, be formed as a replacement for the Pan-Malayan Federation of Trade Unions in the Federation of Malaya. Manyam then stated that he would support the formation of a body that would "integrate the Malayan trade union movement and that would serve as a liaison between unions", though he was wary of "any tendency to bring trade unions under Government control."

In that year, three rival groups emerged with the aim of becoming a trade union congress to unify the unions in Singapore. On May Day, 27 non-English-speaking unions came together to plan a central organisation for industrial unions. The month after, Lim Yew Hock proposed a Trade Union Council for all unions, believing that the Trade Union Ordinance would not allow for a congress modelled after the Trades Union Congress in the United Kingdom. Lim's proposal led two of the union leaders behind the industrial union congress plan, R. K. Samy, the president of the Singapore Traction Company Employees' Union, and S. P. Sarathy, secretary of the Singapore Union of Rubber Workers, to modify their Singapore Workers' Trades Union Congress (SWTUC) into a "co-ordinating body" that served all unions.

P. M. Williams then decided on forming a congress for all unions in Singapore, the Singapore Trades Union Congress (STUC), entirely modelled after the British Trades Union Congress, serving as an "effective liaison" between the unions and the government. Manyam was appointed the chair of the STUC's drafting committee. At the congress's formation meeting, 88 unions were invited, of which about 30 attended. Unlike the SWTUC, the STUC also planned to represent many unions with educated English-speaking clerical workers, as well as unions representing Government employees. The SWTUC did not allow government employee unions as they believed that the Trade Unions Ordinance made this illegal, though they planned on campaigning for an amendment to the ordinance which they felt would allow this. However, Lim, Williams and Manyam were unable to come together and collaborate on the matter due to "personal rivalries" and they were unable to win the support of non-English-speaking unions, who "feared domination" by the educated English-speaking unions and thus aligned themselves with Samy and Sarathy. As such, all three efforts to form such a congress initially failed.

On 10 September 1950, the leaders of 17 unions met to discuss the formation of an STUC. A preparatory committee was formed with V. K. Nair as chair and S. Jaganathan as the secretary. 92 unions were approached, and the committee then consulted Manyam, Williams and Samy, considered the "leading trade unionists". According to Jaganathan, Manyam and Lim were supportive of the plan, while Samy remained fearful of the potential domination of English-speaking unions in such a congress, which Jaganathan felt was an "overcautious view". Manyam attributed the failure of the previous attempts to form a congress to that fear. The STUC had its inaugural meeting on 20 May 1951. The Sunday Times reported that there was a "feeling in trade union circles" that Manyam had attended the meeting to "oppose" M. P. D. Nair. This was rejected by both Manyam and Nair. At the meeting, Nair introduced a resolution to remove a reporter from The Straits Times from the meeting over the allegations, as they were "prejudicial to the interests of the trade union movement". This was seconded by Manyam and passed.

=== SFSU ===
Manyam attended the annual delegates conference of the Singapore Federation of Services Unions (SFSU), representing the ACSU, the Air Ministry Local Staff Union (AMLSU) and the Singapore Admiralty Local Staff Union (SALSU), held on 17 June 1951. He was elected the SFSU's president with a majority of just one vote; Jaganathan of AMLSU and Lee of the ACSU were elected the vice-presidents, and Chew of the ACSU the general secretary. Manyam then pledged to "make every effort to bring in the industrial workers of the three Services as an integral part of the Federation." The federation was then still seeking recognition from the unions' various employers.

The SFSU alleged that in August, despite their efforts, the Army had continued to delay settling their claims. As a "final attempt" to secure salary revisions and the introduction of a cost of living allowance, the federation would send a delegation of three, with each of the services unions represented by one member, to meet John Strachey, the Secretary of State for War, at the War Office in London. If these negotiations still failed to settle the matter, a strike was to be called. Manyam was appointed the ACSU's representative. At the end of the month, the SFSU, which then represented over 30,000 workers, delivered a two-week ultimatum to the Services Ministries in the United Kingdom, threatening to call a strike if their demands were not settled within that period.

In September, the ACSU organised a protest meeting against the cost of living allowance provided to the workers, which was less than what their counterparts under the government received. At the same meeting, the union officially affiliated itself with the newly formed United Nations Association, with Manyam, Lee, Williams, M. P. D. Nair, V. K. Nair and J. S. Nair appointed the ACSU's representatives in the association. The SFSU then agreed to hold a mass meeting at the end of the month to protest against the allowance, with a committee being formed to oversee this; Manyam was elected to the committee, alongside Jaganathan, Williams, Chew, A. M. Nair, M. P. D. Nair, V. K. Nair, R. P. Eswaran, Ivan Richards, M. C. Sequeira and Chew Beng Seng. At the meeting, he told the 2,000 workers present to ready for a strike, proclaiming that he was "prepared to sacrifice himself on the altar".

Manyam wrote to Commissioner-General Malcolm MacDonald in October, requesting that he "intervene" with the Service Ministries in the United Kingdom, being "disgusted" with the employers' refusal to accept the union's demands. He also suggested the formation of an Inter-Services Whitley Council. At the start of November, a delegation of the SFSU, comprising Manyam, Eswaran, M. P. D. Nair, A. M. Nair and Chew Seng, was sent to negotiate with MacDonald. Following the talks, a joint statement issued by Manyam and MacDonald's Labour Adviser T. M. Cowan claimed that MacDonald had agreed to discuss the matter with the Services Ministers.

==== Resignation ====
In February 1952, the delegation ultimately accepted an offer by MacDonald for the unions to negotiate individually with their respective employers, which Manyam claimed he opposed. Members of SALSU opposed this and organised a petition to break away from the SFSU, believing that the latter organisation should have been the "only body to negotiate jointly on behalf of all the civilian employees." They also felt that several of the SFSU leaders on the City Council had devoted more of their time to politics than to the unions, though they claimed to have "full confidence" in Manyam. Nevertheless, he resigned as president of SFSU on 17 February, heavily criticising the leaders of all three unions for agreeing to Macdonald's offer.

Chew, as the SFSU general-secretary, and P. K. Chan, as acting president of SALSU, claimed that Manyam had not informed them of his resignation and instead made a "hasty resort" to the local press that was "completely out of order and highly irregular." Chew then alleged that there was no movement within the SALSU to break away from the SFSU, a claim which Chan and SALSU's secretary supported. They concluded that Manyam had done this due to his "insatiable lust for publicity." The presidents of the three unions then issued a joint statement claiming that Manyam had "fully associated" with them in the negotiation and that the SFSU was purely an "advisory body", with the leaders having "acted in the best interests of their union members".

Commenting on Manyam's resignation, Rimau of The Singapore Standard opined that the three unions individually represented trade unionism in Malaya "at its best", succeeding through "orderly methods and inch-by-inch gains won in an atmosphere of mutual respect", with the ACSU being the most powerful. Rimau stated that he had been told that Manyam had "no very emphatic protest to make" against the agreement at the negotiations, and accused him of having "taken a long time to select a moment to publicise his indignation on their behalf" and to emerge into a "somewhat dingy limelight" as the "sole and valiant" champion of an alternative to what the three unions had previously been doing, which was "bulk negotiation" by the SFSU. Manyam's resignation was eventually accepted and Lee was elected to succeed him as president in April.

In March 1953, the ACSU decided at its conference to move a plan to consolidate the three unions into one to represent all 30,000 employees of the War Department. It was decided that both Manyam and M. P. D. Nair would receive honorary memberships in "appreciation of their services to ACSU".

=== Other unions ===
On 4 February 1951, Manyam alleged that there was "considerable" discrimination in the differences between the salaries of European and Asian employees in the office of the Commissioner-General in Southeast Asia, stating that Europeans earned four or five times more than the Asians. In addition, he criticised the workers' pay and lack of benefits overall, and announced that he would soon be organising a union to represent the office's workers. Late in the month, he called a meeting for the employees of the office to discuss a potential union. 70 of the workers again met at the premises of the Singapore Municipal Services Union on 4 March and formed the union, the Commissioner-General's Local Staff Union (CGLSU); Manyam was elected the president in the meantime.

At the CGLSU's annual general meeting, held on 6 May, it was announced that the employees would receive a 10% increase in their cost of living allowances, and that the union would seek to affiliate with the STUC. For the incoming year, Manyam was elected the president and F. E. Rodrigues the vice-president; the two were also elected the union's representatives on the STUC. In March 1952, Manyam announced that the CGLSU had been successful in convincing the office to give its employees the same rate of cost of living allowances that the Colony Government gave its employees, effective from January 1951.

On 12 June, Manyam announced that he would look into forming a union for the 1,000 employees of United Engineers Limited. In October, Manyam was nominated for election as Singapore's representative to the upcoming International Labour Organisation seminar, to be held in New Delhi at the end of the month. He came in second, with six votes, behind Samy, who received 13.

== Politics ==
By June 1948, Manyam had joined the Malayan Democratic Union (MDU), a left-wing socialist party founded in 1945 as the first political party in Singapore, which was then one of two parties on the island, alongside the Progressive Party (PP). He was then elected to its executive committee. However, the party was voluntarily dissolved later that month with the beginning of the Malayan Emergency after its leaders had heard that the government planned to take action against it. The party was considered a Communist front due to its cooperation with the Malayan Communist Party (MCP) and the election of several members of the latter party to the MDU's executive committee shortly before its closure. This left the PP the sole political party in Singapore at the time.

=== Labour Party founding ===
M. A. Majid, the founder of the Labour Party.

In July 1948, fellow union leader M. A. Majid announced that he and Manyam, in addition to several other union leaders, had come together to plan the establishment of a new political party, to be known as the Singapore Labour Party (SLP), which was to "rally the labouring classes to a non-Communist platform." However, Majid's true motive in setting up the party was to win over the local Indian community, which he believed "would be a major winning factor in future elections." Manyam then stated that there was "wide support" among local unionists for a party which pushed for social democratic ideals, and that the SLP would be "limited strictly to the workers", with policies that would benefit the working class in addition to ensuring a "high economic standard" in Singapore. He also clarified that the party would not be affiliated officially with the unions that the party's founders had come from, and that he and the SLP's organisers' work in setting up the party had been done in a purely "personal capacity."

A meeting attended by about a hundred who were interested in becoming a member of this party was held on 1 September, at which the party was officially inaugurated. Majid then announced that the party was to be modelled after the Labour Party in the United Kingdom and stated that the SLP would have to "rest on a strong trade union movement." A provisional committee of the party was formed; Majid was elected the president, Manyam the secretary, and G. Sarangapani, Francis Thomas, Eric Woodford, A. Mohamed Kamal and A. Latif the interim committee. ACSU leaders P. M. Williams and M. P. D. Nair joined Majid in inaugurating the party. The SLP met again on 29 November to elect its officeholders for the coming year and adopt a constitution, after which it was to officially register as a political party. Majid was officially elected the president and Thomas and Sankaran the vice-presidents, though Manyam was succeeded by R. K. Bhattacharya, who was elected the honorary general secretary. The SLP was to actively push for self-governance in addition to advocating for workers' rights, in contrast to the relatively pro-British PP, which advocated for gradual reforms that would eventually lead to self-governance.

Manyam participated in the SLP's first election campaign, with the party deciding to debut in the second Municipal Commission election, held on 2 April. The SLP had fielded five candidates to contest four of the six wards, each with three seats. He gave a speech in support of M. P. D. Nair, the party's sole candidate for the West Ward, at an election meeting held on Dhoby Ghaut at the end of March. He stated that while the SLP's goals were the product of "immature minds", the party "knew what it wanted". Of the five, only one won their seat; Pat Johnson had come first in the North Ward and was elected on a term ending in December 1951, becoming the first SLP member on the Municipal Commission. The PP had taken control of the commission, winning 13 of the 18 seats up for grabs. In October, he was "co-opted" to the SLP's Executive Council to fill a vacant seat.

==== December 1949 election ====
On 15 October, the SLP announced four of the six candidates it had fielded to contest in the upcoming election for the Municipal Commission, to be held on 3 December; they were F. Bernard Oehlers, S. M. A. H. Chisty, Mak Pak Shee and Manyam. The last two candidates, as well as the Wards each candidate was to contest, were then still kept under wraps to "keep the Progressives guessing about their opponents". Of the four candidates revealed, only Chisty had previously stood for election. In December, six seats were up for grabs, one in each ward; of these seats, four were occupied by PP members, with the other two being occupied by independents, one of whom decided on running on the PP ticket.

Manyam then opined that statements made by the PP in its annual report, published five months ago, which noted that the ACSU had approached the PP despite having "failed" to vote for it, indicated that that the PP "[would] not help the people who [did] not support it." C. C. Tan, the head of the PP, pointed out that the report had been published months ago and accused Manyam of "preferring his political interest" to that of the War Department workers, and that the allegations were a clear "act of opportunism" to win votes and an "example of how [Manyam was] twisting facts in order to serve his own ends." Manyam rejected this response, claiming that Tan had "carefully avoided" answering the points he made in his statement, claiming that the PP had "clearly indicated to the people that they [had] no originality in any of the measures which they [advocated]."

On 19 October, Manyam announced that he would be withdrawing from the election as he had found that he was not on the register of voters, thus making him ineligible for the contest. He claimed that he and his wife, Stella Manyam, had submitted their registration forms on 7 July, and the Supervisor of Elections suggested that the couple's forms might have been "wrongly filled", and that it was thus possible that their forms had to be returned. Manyam then assumed that his form had been "lost in the post." He then revealed that he would have contested the South Ward, believing that he "had the support of 90 per cent." of the electorate there, and pledged to contest in the next election and to continue supporting the SLP in its campaign for December. M. P. D. Nair was selected to contest the South Ward in his place, and Manyam again spoke in support of Nair. V. K. Nair and E. V. Davies were revealed as the last two SLP candidates.

In the election, all but two of the SLP candidates, Davies and Chisty, failed to secure a majority in their wards, with three of the four unsuccessful SLP candidates, including M. P. D. Nair, losing to a PP candidate. The Malaya Tribune reported that the supporters of both the SLP and the PP "appeared to be quite happy" with the outcome. Davies and Chisty became the second and third SLP members on the Municipal Commission, joining Johnson, who was now the SLP's leader on the commission.

=== Progressive Party ===
In the middle of May 1950, it was revealed that Manyam had quit the SLP to join the PP, initially without giving a reason. This was the first instance of an SLP official leaving the party to join the PP. He then revealed that he and Stella, who was also on the SLP's Executive Council, had quit two months ago in secret, claiming that they had done so as the SLP was "inconsistent in its policy and [had] no fixed programme for the future." He had quit in protest of "certain power demagogues" and their attempts to "[twist] the meaning of the Party constitution to suit their own purposes." Manyam proclaimed that he still remained invested in advocating for the working class and felt that the aims of the PP were "not very different" from that of the SLP as outlined in its constitution. He denied that he had switched parties to contest in the next Municipal Commission election, again to be held in December, claiming that he did not intend to stand as a candidate.

In the face of accusations that he had "betrayed" the local labour movement, Manyam claimed that he now believed that the PP was "not opposed to labour." He acknowledge that he had previously been a harsh critic of the party, stating that he had "come to respect them for their far-sighted policies and sane outlook" on issues faced by the population of Singapore. Shortly after Manyam publicly announced his departure from the SLP, the party's Executive Council had a "stormy" meeting, and The Straits Times reported that it was believed that several members of the council who had "expressed dissatisfaction with the working of the party" might follow Manyam in quitting, thus leading to a split from the SLP. At the PP's annual general meeting in June 1951, Manyam was elected to its executive committee.

==== 1950 election ====
The PP announced in early July that it would again be contesting all six wards in December, and that it had thus far fielded five candidates: Chan Kum Chee, Soh Ghee Soon, Sandy G. Pillay, S. A. Mohamed Ali and Manyam, who were to contest in the North, South, West, City and Rochore Wards, respectively. Of the six seats, five were previously held by the PP, with Pillay running for re-election and Abdul bin Samat, S. K. Gaw and Vayloo Pakirisamy Pillai choosing not to run again. The final PP incumbent, Frank Caulfield James in the East Ward, confirmed at the end of the month that he would also be running for re-election. The SLP was also to contest all six wards, with journalist V. Rajaratnam being nominated in the North Ward. No other candidate stood in the North Ward, leaving it a straight fight between the SLP and the PP.

Journalist V. Rajaratnam, the Labour Party candidate for the North Ward in 1950.

As a former SLP member, Manyam had a "strong following" among workers, and the North Ward was expected to be "one of the most keenly contested" wards of the election. The ward was then considered an SLP stronghold, having elected both Johnson and Davies. At a meeting of the newly formed SLP North Ward election committee, the campaign manager, Sarangapani, warned the SLP against "complacency" and told party members to carry out an "intensive house to house canvassing campaign", while Majid proclaimed that Rajaratnam "must win". The latter felt that Rajaratnam's success would mean the SLP's "success", while his defeat would mean the SLP's "defeat". At the end of November, The Straits Times reported that Rajaratnam was the only candidate whom the SLP was "confident" would win.

Manyam issued his manifesto on 24 October, the first in the election to do so. In it, he pledged to advocate for the improvement of the area's amenities, introducing facilities such as a market in the Tiong Bahru area and ensuring that the Singapore Improvement Trust flats on Kim Keat Road had access to electricity and water. He would push for better working conditions and more benefits for Municipal workers, nationalising public transport and increasing the amount of control the commission had over "all expenditures and proper allotment of funds, according priority to the urgent needs of the majority." Other planks of his platform included pushing for "greater goodwill and co-operation" between employers and employees, the clearing of slums and pushing for the abolition of nominated members on the Legislative Council and Municipal Commission. He charged the SLP with being an unoriginal "sham organisation" that had been "killed by communalism, strife for power and personal considerations." Additionally, he claimed that the SLP had taken many of its positions directly from the Labour Party in the United Kingdom.

Sarangapani, now a vice-president of the SLP accused Manyam of having quit the SLP "when he failed to gain certain personal ends", and P. M. Williams, now the general secretary, considered the allegations against the SLP "uncalled for", opining that Manyam's switch from the SLP to the PP, whose "principles were fundamentally at variance", indicated that the latter was being opportunistic, noting Manyam's previous declaration that he would not contest the election. Rajaratnam accused him of having "changed from one party just as he changes his clothes", as well as for "dragging Indian politics" into the election. Manyam reiterated that he found the PP's policies, goals and prospects to be better than that of the SLP, disavowing his previous criticisms on the PP, and pointed out that Sarangapani had chaired a PP election meeting in the previous election and previously declared that he would not be affiliated to any party. He defended his decision to switch parties by noting that "greater men", such as Winston Churchill, had done so, as had several members of the SLP who had come from the PP. Manyam delivered the PP's final election broadcast, while SLP president Lim Yew Hock delivered the SLP's.

===== Results and analysis =====
In the election, Manyam won the seat with 836 votes and a majority of 196, ahead of Rajaratnam with 640. The more PP-aligned The Sunday Standard considered this a "major defeat" for the SLP and one of the "biggest surprises" of the election, alongside M. P. D. Nair's triumph over Chan in the South Ward, which "no doubt" made up for Rajaratnam's loss. M. P. D. Nair's victory brought the number of SLP commissioners back to three after Johnson's resignation from the party left it with just two, though the PP had, on paper, ultimately lost three seats in total, as Pillay did not end up contesting and Mohamed Ali ran as an independent instead, leaving both the City and Rochore Wards to independents. Soh and James also triumphed in their wards.

Manyam's victory was attributed by Standard to the SLP's focus on the South Ward, exemplified by the low turnout in the North Ward compared to past elections and the "lack of transport" made available to Rajaratnam, though the latter factor also applied to all Labour candidates but Nair. The SLP-aligned Indian Daily Mail contended the Standard's characterisation of Rajaratnam's loss as a "major defeat" for the SLP, finding that it could not be considered as such when the loss was purely as a result of the SLP having "forfeited it voluntarily" in favour of the South Ward, where the PP had a "monopoly". The Daily Mail additionally attributed Manyam's victory to a case of "mistaken identity", claiming that many were unaware of Manyam's switch to the PP and had continued to regard him as a "Labour leader", as did a significant portion of those who were aware of the switch. The Daily Mail characterised the North Ward contest as a "domestic duel between Labour candidates", opining that, as such, Manyam's victory was not a victory for the PP overall.

The Daily Mail ultimately concluded that if the SLP remedied the "organisational defects and deficiencies", as well as the lacklustre campaign and the lack of transport, the party winning all three seats in the ward would be "inevitable". The SLP's president, Lim Yew Hock, publicly attributed Manyam's victory primarily to the SLP's lack of transport. The Malaya Tribune reported that the SLP's performance as a whole was considered a defeat for the party as several popular policies had formed key planks of the SLP platform, though it noted that the "workers' case" would still be "fairly well represented" through the victories of both Manyam and Nair.

=== Municipal Commission ===
At the first meeting of the newly reconstituted Municipal Commission, held on 6 December, Manyam was appointed to the Public Works Committee, alongside S. I. O. Alsagoff, F. L. Lane, J. M. Jumabhoy, Jee Ah Chian and Amy Ede, and to the Service Committee, alongside Nair, James, George Oehlers and Yap Pheng Geck. The latter body was to be put in charge of looking over the terms of service of all Municipal employees, replacing the Labour Committee.

==== Service Committee ====
At the commission's meeting on 31 January 1951, Manyam had intended to introduce a motion whereby "open vote" employees of the Municipality who had not attained a Senior Cambridge School Certificate could still be eligible for promotion to permanent clerical positions. However, he was successful in persuading the Service Committee to push for this before the meeting itself. At the start of the following month, he announced that he would be looking into the possibility of a Whitley Council for Municipal employees. In March, he proposed abolishing work fines. Also in March, it was reported that both Manyam and Nair had begun pushing for wage increases for the 10,000 daily-paid Municipal employees. It had been over a year since it was decided that the Permanent Labour Committee should be consulted on the matter first, and since it had yet to come to a decision, Manyam suggested an increase in the meantime, though Nair instead pushed for an immediate permanent increase.

The month after, Manyam announced that he would be introducing two motions, one calling for an increase in the monthly salaries of Municipal clerks and the removal of the Senior Cambridge Certificate as a prerequisite to being hired as a Municipal clerk, replacing this with a competitive examination. On 23 April, Manyam announced that he had modified the first motion, which was now to call for a revision of the wages of all monthly-paid Municipal employees, modelled after the Government salary scheme instituted based on the findings of the Interim Report of the Sales Revision Committee. The commissioners decided on having the Service Committee look over a potential salary revision.

The Service Committee unanimously agreed in mid-May to accept the "principle" of Manyam's motion on salary revisions, and to form a subcommittee to recommend the revisions. Manyam and J. L. Byrne, the Assistant Municipal Secretary for Welfare, were appointed to this. The committee also approved a 10 cent increase to the daily "dirt allowances" to workers in the Town Cleansing Department. Manyam's original motion on abolishing the Senior Cambridge Certification qualification in favour of a competitive examination was approved. Yap then introduced a motion to form a special committee to oversee the salary revision based on the committee's findings, crediting Manyam with having initiated this investigation. The motion was passed, and Manyam was appointed to this special committee, alongside Yap, Nair and nominated commissioner H. J. Rae. By April 1952, however, the council employees claimed that the scheme produced by Manyam and Blythe had been "lying in cold storage" for 10 months and threatened to go on strike. Manyam stated that he would press for "immediate consideration" of the scheme.

At the end of April, Manyam suggested that a decision to have "experience in a large electricity undertaking", among other qualifications, be prerequisites for being appointed to the post of assistant commercial secretary, be deferred to a committee, finding that these requirements were unncessarily high and preventing locals from achieving that position. The debate was deferred for the next meeting, held the following month, at which his motion was approved by the commission for further consideration. At the same meeting, Manyam, Yap, Oehlers, James and Nair were appointed to a committee which was to hold night sessions to reduce the commission's backlog, as devised by the Service Committee.

In early June, the sub-committee on salary revisions, now down to just Manyam and Byrne, had decided on incremental pay rises and standardising job titles across the various departments of the Municipality. The sub-committee's findings were released in mid-August, recommending incremental rates for 'open vote' employees of the Municipality. This faced criticism from the Assistant Municipal Health Officer, W. E. Hutchinson, who pointed out that there might be "widespread repercussions" if only "select categories" of such employees were switched to a monthly salary instead. On the rollout of a cost of living award for government employees, Manyam drew up a proposal for a similar award for Municipal employees. In August, the Singapore Standard reported that Manyam and M. P. D. Nair were to issue a minority report in opposition to the salary revisions recommended by the Salaries Review Committee of the commission. The report was ultimately published by just Manyam and argued that the City Council worker salaries should have been higher.

In mid-August, Manyam announced that he would initiate a motion calling for the removal of the possession of a Board of Trade Diesel Certificate prerequisite for the post of Assistant Engineer (Municipal), which had been decided by the Public Works Committee, believing that this was a "most discouraging" barrier for local employees. The commission voted to have the motion referred back to the committee. A. P. Rajah of the PP then proposed that it be deferred till the prerequisites for the posts of Superintendent and Deputy Superintendent of the Municipal Workshops were decided, and this received the support of all commissioners except Manyam, who felt that the decision on those posts would be motivated by the commiteee's "desire to maintain the original decision" on the Assistant Engineer (Municipal) position. The motion was then passed 13 to four at the end of the month.

==== Community centres ====
Shortly after taking office, he stated that he would work towards erecting community centres in parts of the city that "[needed] them badly", such as Paya Lebar, Kim Keat Road and Farrer Park. The island then lacked official community centres, and though several community leaders had already begun setting up community centres in an unofficial capacity, such as the Tiong Bahru Community Centre, he pointed out that they often struggled to find suitable premises. Manyam then announced shortly before the meeting at the end of February 1951 that he would be introducing a motion calling for the Municipality to work with the government to set up community centres in the Municipality. This proposal was praised heavily by The Singapore Standard, which felt that the introduction of community centres would help solve the "problem" of leisure, and that this "should meet with the approval of every citizen in this Colony."

Introducing the motion at the meeting, however, led to a "breezy exchange" between the PP and SLP commissioners. Nair claimed that establishing community centres was on the SLP's agenda, and that Manyam had thus "not deserted" the SLP. Nair then introduced an amendment which called for the formation of a three-member subcommittee of the commission which would oversee the erection and management of the community centres. After a brief dispute between Nair and the PP's leader on the commission, C. F. J. Ess, involving Nair's remarks on Manyam's "deserting" the SLP, Manyam clarified that he had already considered Nair's proposition and felt that this should be decided later on, and stated that the introduction of community centres had been on his manifesto, claiming that he was now acting on this "promise" which the SLP had failed to deliver. Nominated commissioner C. J. Poh introduced an amendment calling for the formation of a committee with the government to deliberate the matter, and this was passed.

In the months that followed, Manyam complained about the delay in having the committee set up. He wrote to the Government that three representatives from the commission be put on the committee, and to consult those who had been involved in establishing community centres in an unofficial capacity. The committee was finally formed in October, with the government appointing three officials, Alfred William Frisby, R. I. Band and J. Le Provost, as representatives on the body. Manyam, Nair and Robertson were appointed the commission's representatives on the committee.

Manyam announced in early December that the committee, now the Community Development Committee, had drawn up a plan for the introduction of a community centre in every estate or kampong with more than 50 families, to be governed by elected committees overseen by a government-appointed warden. They were to adhere to a constitution the committee would author. The committee also planned to take over the unofficial community centres already in existence. However, the month after, he complained about the delay in organising a meeting for the committee, noting that there were voluntary centres "[springing] up like mushrooms all over the City without any definite pattern."

The committee discussed a scheme Manyam drew up at its first meeting. This was to involve the formation of a Council of Community Development, comprising legislators, councillors and community leaders in addition to adult educators and representatives from the social and education departments, to oversee the establishment and management of community centres. His plans for community centres were then discussed at its meeting in February. The council's first community centre, intended for the daily-paid workers of the City Council, opened at the start of the year as the Rochore Community Centre. Manyam became a patron of the Balestier Community Centre, alongside Rajah, Lee, Davies and Legislative Councillor Thio Chan Bee. On the December 1954 opening of the Stamford Community Centre, Manyam was elected its treasurer. In February 1955, Manyam, Lee and George Yap Cheng Yan were elected patrons of the Alexandra Community Centre.

==== Registry of Vehicles ====
At the end of June 1951, Manyam pushed for a "speed-up" in Municipal Administration, citing the case of 18 vehicle inspectors who had been hired by the Registry of Vehicles on a probationary basis, and had been awaiting a promotion to a permanent post, which they had been promised, for over a year. He then called for the upcoming promotional examinations for vehicles sub inspectors, to be held on 14 July, to be cancelled, noting that the sub inspectors had not been provided the materials required to prepare for the examination. The Examinations Committee chose to move forward with the examination anyway, and 17 sub inspectors then "boycotted" the examination in protest. He successfully advocated for them to be allowed to explain the reasoning for their absence to the committee, which allowed them to take an oral examination instead.

Also in July, he authored a memorandum calling for the abolition of the judicial powers of the Registrar of Vehicles, arguing that the Registrar should not act as a magistrate in addition to being a prosecutor. The Straits Times then reported that this power of the Registrar was a "system of autocratic control" that had "so far escaped the attentions of Municipal Commissioners." He initiated a motion to abolish this power at the end of the month, though Nair then pointed out that the matter was already being discussed by an ad hoc committee. Manyam also attempted to have a decision by the commission to order inspectors to conduct outdoor duties on foot, barring them from using their own private vehicles, reversed. He had previously protested against this, with only one commissioner, independent K. Jagatheesan, agreeing with him. He initiated a motion to remove this rule at the end of August, supported by Nair. However, the motion failed and resulted in a heated exchange between Manyam and fellow PP commissioner Duncan Robertson.

==== Other activities ====
Manyam initiated a motion at the end of March 1951 to rehouse tenants of houses which had been condemned and who had been evicted as a result, believing that this was the responsibility of the commission. While he was supported by James, Yap contended that it was a "dangerous principle" to admit that rehousing these tenants was the commission's responsibility, and the motion was ultimately lost. In the same meeting, he moved to have a 50 cent per 1,000 cubic feet increase in gas prices be delayed by three months to "ascertain if the increase would be warranted." This was voted down, with Nair, who had previously supported the motion, voting against it "to do justice to public criticism."

At the end of April, Manyam initiated a motion which would defer discussion on all standing committee decisions, stating that time was "too short to allow the decisions to be read individually". This motion failed, and he refused to take part in over a quarter of the meeting's discussions of standing committees' decisions and recommendations, becoming the first on the commission to do so. In early June, Manyam was appointed to a sub-committee which was to devise a system to "speed up" the work of the Singapore Municipal Engineer's Department, alongside Lane. At the start of November, he announced that he would seek to reverse the commission's decision to increase the number of London-style taxis in Singapore from 100 to 400, arguing that the public did not favour these taxis over what was already the norm in Singapore. The commission decided to refer the decision to the Vehicles and Traffic Committee. The commission's insistence on London taxis was finally "thrown out" in May 1953.

At the meeting of the commission at the end of December 1950, just the second since the election, Manyam and Nair clashed over the latter's motion to open up Singapore Improvement Trust (SIT) flats for all. Manyam accused Nair of trying to "reassert election promises" and "[glamorising] by the easy but ugly method of trying to do what others had already done." In response, Nair stated that it was the "vanity of a traitor" which had led Manyam to oppose the motion in that manner. In May, the Sunday Times reported that Manyam and Nair were viewed as having "often disagreed" on the commission. Manyam rejected this characterisation as "uncalled for and mischievous" while Nair felt that the paper "[had] a growl several sizes too big for it." Manyam conceded that he and Nair had "personal differences" on several issues, though he claimed that they agreed on "matters of common interest and benefit to the workers".

=== City Council ===
Singapore officially attained city status by a royal charter on 22 September 1951. With this, the Municipal Commission of Singapore was renamed the City Council of Singapore, and the Municipal Commissioners were henceforth known as City Councillors. The SLP performed well at the 1951 City Council Election, held on 1 December, winning three more seats and bringing the total number of SLP members on the council to six. P. R. Williams and the leaders of a "rebel" faction of the SLP, Lee Chon Eng and V. K. Nair, won in the Rochore, South and West wards, respectively. They each won over a PP candidate. The election of three more ACSU officials was expected to result in more unionists standing for election in the future. Officially, the number of PP candidates on the council dropped from nine to eight and the independents from six to four, though S. A. Mohamed Ali, who had been re-elected in 1950 as an independent, was a member of the PP and was generally considered a PP councillor.

At the first meeting of the newly reconstituted City Council, Manyam was placed on the Vehicles and Traffic Committee, alongside Robertson, Williams, H. A. Jivabhai and a new nominated councillor, and again the Services Committee, alongside Oehlers, Yap, M. P. D. Nair and Chan Kum Chee. The Services Committee had been abolished, a move he was critical of and viewed as an example of the councillors' tendency to "shirk their responsibility towards the employees of the City Council." Despite this, he continued to introduce motions that advocated for the workers. Toward the end of 1953, the Singapore City Council Labour Unions Federation threatened to call a strike over "long outstanding claims." Manyam then pointed out that this did not happen under the Services Committee and called for its re-establishment."

==== Expulsion and resignation ====
The PP's governing committee decided at a meeting on 13 December to call on Manyam and Arthur Joseph, a vehicles inspector and founding member of the PP, to explain why they should not be expelled. The Straits Times noted that Manyam's expulsion would further narrow the PP's majority on the Council and increase the number of independents to five. Manyam then revealed that he had sent in his resignation to the PP's committee on 7 December, though this was not accepted by the party's leaders. He claimed that the PP had accused him of aiding P. R. Williams in the latter's campaign as he had lent Williams his car and of failing to "get along" with other PP councillors. Manyam agreed with the latter but rejected the former, defending himself by noting that it was his wife that had lent him the car and that she had only done so as he was her sibling. He told the committee that he would be continuing on the council as an independent, though he claimed to still have "great personal regard" for C. C. Tan, among other members of the PP.

S. M. Vasagar, the PP candidate who lost to V. K. Nair, then accused Manyam of having failed to honour his promise to hold two election meetings for Vasagar, and Robertson claimed that Manyam had "prejudiced the Progressive cause" by voting with independents and SLP members of the Vehicles and Traffic Committee to deny him vice-chairmanship of the committee. Manyam admitted that he "did not see eye to eye" with the PP members of the council and often disagreed with their stances. He then stated that, as he was now no longer a member of the PP, he would not be attending the "trial" afforded to him. Now an independent, Manyam announced that he would look into establishing another Socialist party and stated his belief that all five of the independents on the council, himself included, to "act together on important questions." The latter proposition was supported by Jumabhoy, who supported the formation of an "Independent group" claimed that an agreement of sorts already existed between him, Jagatheesan and Jivabhai, and that the three often voted together already, leaving just Mohamed Ali.

Neither Manyam nor Joseph attended the PP meeting and the party's committee voted to expel both. Manyam then announced that he would soon form the People's Party, believing there to be enough room for another Socialist party appealing to the working class. However, he told The Straits Times the day after that he had changed his mind, and that there was no need for another party catering toward the working class given the existence of the SLP. He had come to feel that a third party would only split the labour vote. He also reiterated that he could not be expelled as political affiliation was "voluntary" and that when he had sent in his resignation, he ceased to be a member of the PP. Historian Yeo Kim Wah noted that, through the expulsion of Manyam, as well as the later expulsions of Robertson, Sim Beng Seng and Mohamed Sidik, the PP "projected itself as a stable, disciplined and orderly party."

==== Independent Labour Party ====
On 14 January 1952, Manyam again announced that he would seek to establish a democratic socialist party in Singapore, to be known as the Independent Labour Party (ILP), claiming that associates of his had already asked him to consider forming such an "exclusive" socialist party that was "independent of imperialistic affiliations" and aimed at the "political, social and economic emancipation of the working class." The party was to contest elections in Singapore, as well as in the Federation of Malaya. He claimed that a constitution had already been drawn up by an interim committee composed of socialists who had yet to be involved in local politics, and that a party meeting to elect a General Council would be held at his house on 27 January. He was also to advance a resolution to advocate abolishing the constitutions of Singapore and the Federation, which were to be replaced by a central government with a fully elected legislature. Manyam proclaimed that the party would also push for the recognition of Maoist China by the United Nations, a view that was heavily criticised in the Chung Shing Jit Pau, which regarded it as an example of his "ignorance in international affairs."

The Singapore Standard suggested that the party may have been modelled after the Independent Labour Party in the United Kingdom, and while it felt that that party had "played a prominent role in [the] shaping of Labour politics in that country", it was also by then already facing in relevance. Additionally, the Standard felt that there were too many political parties being announced from breakaway groups of both the PP and SLP with "too little political ideas." Noting that many of its positions were already held by the SLP and many other parties in Malaya with "no new political idea to offer", it felt that the ILP would be redundant. The Standard suggested that Manyam's "divine discontent" with the existing parties in Singapore should have gone into joining the parties with policies similar to that of his proposed party and "[whipping] them into sticking to the path they had set for themselves." The ILP received the support of those who were opposed to the Lim-led faction of the SLP.

The Straits Times reported on 20 January that J. G. Napalli, the organiser of the People's Party, another proposed political party formed out of dissatisfaction with both the PP and the SLP, had stated that the People's Party might fold into the ILP if the latter party's aims and policies were both similar enough and met their expectations. However, Napalli then denied this, stating that the People's Party "would not cater for only one class or creed but for all". The ILP of Malaya was officially formed at a meeting on 27 January, at which a resolution was passed to call on the Secretary of State for the Colonies to work towards unifying Singapore and the Federation. Manyam was elected the General Secretary of the party, which was to be led by an eight-member committee. He responded to criticism on the ILP's similarity to the SLP by claiming that it differed from the latter by catering towards Malaya as a whole as opposed to just Singapore.

Other stances of the ILP were to include a common nationality for Malaya as a whole and putting the banks, electricity, gas, mining, rubber, public transport, housing and healthcare under "public agencies representing local communities", overseen by a "national planning board". It advocated for paying workers based on their "ability" and "worth". Membership was to be exclusive to those who adhered to and advocated for evolutionary socialism; all others who had not "proved their sincerity" were to be admitted as associate members without any say in party affairs, though with the opportunity to become official members later on. Manyam stated that the ILP was opposed to the National Service Bill due to the then lack of a "common nationality" in Malaya, finding it "wrong to impose the bill on non-Malayans".

On 24 September 1953, Manyam told The Singapore Free Press that the ILP had ceased to function as the government had refused to grant it "exemption from registration", which he alleged was due to a clause in its constitution that "did not please" the government.

==== Tenure as independent ====
On the expulsion of M. P. D. Nair from the SLP in March for his statements in support of the UMNO-MCA alliance, Manyam urged for this to be rescinded, arguing that Nair had the right to free speech. At the City Council meeting at the end of the month, he and Jumabhoy were elected the council's representatives on the Singapore Council for Adult Education.

At the end of June, Davies, the leader of the SLP on the council, initiated a motion calling for a fully-elected City Council. However, Rajah, the PP's leader on the council, then put forth the amendment for the election of a mayor and the selection of six aldermen from those who had served on the council for three years, justifying this by stating that this would allow for a "pool of experienced councillors who could be called to serve the city." Rajah's amendment faced heavy opposition from the SLP and the independent bloc, who felt that this plan would heavily favour the PP. In response, Davies led a nine-member councillor walkout, being followed by the other SLP councillors, a now independent M. P. D. Nair, and Manyam, Jivabhai, Jumabhoy and Jagatheesan. Rajah then continued to move the amendment, which passed with just six PP votes; the remaining nominated councillors, as well as Mohamed Ali, the sole remaining independent, abstained. Chisty, Jumabhoy and Jivabhai went home while the rest, including Manyam, returned after the vote in time for adjournment speeches. Robertson opined that the walkout was "irresponsible." Typically, the amendment would have "become the substantive motion", but Rajah then had the amendment referred to a committee which was to look into the recommendations of a government expert's report.

In mid-1953, Manyam came out against the opening ceremony which was to be held for the Pasir Panjang Power Station, which was to cost $10,000. He was joined in this effort by the Labour councillors P. R. Williams, Lee and Lazarous, and the four sent a letter to the council's president proclaiming that the ceremony would have a "large sum of public funds" be "sinfully wasted". As a City Councillor, he received the Queen Elizabeth II Coronation Medal in June 1953.

==== Vehicles and Traffic Committee ====
In May 1952, Manyam submitted a memorandum to the Traffic Advisory Committee and Traffic Police arguing that there should be no limit to the number of taxis licensed in Singapore, noting that around 75% of the population lacked access to public transport. He was the only member of the Vehicles and Traffic Committee to completely oppose a limit. He initiated a motion to remove the limit on the number of second class taxis of the private class type at the end of July; this was defeated in the council seven-to-eight. In early October 1953, he sent a letter to the committee suggesting that the number of first-class taxis be doubled from 100 to 200, finding the 100 limit for such taxis to be "inadequate" and an "inconvenience" to both the public and tourists.

At the end of June 1952, Manyam moved a resolution calling for the Singapore Traction Company (STC) to provide an "adequate and efficient bus service." He then submitted a report on the matter to the committee which eventually culminated in October in a proper investigation on the STC's bus services. As a result of this investigation, Manyam authored a memorandum, with the support of the committee, issued in May 1953, recommending that the STC's trolleybuses be removed in favour of double-decker buses. He also recommended that no further applications by the STC for new routes be accepted until the council was satisfied with the STC's services. The month after, he was appointed to a special committee led by V. K. Nair, alongside Soh and S. F. Ho, which was to investigate complaints on the STC's services. The sub-committee unanimously agreed to adopt Manyam's recommendations in July.

==== Eligibility as councillor ====
The Singapore Ratepayers' Association (SRA) first queried the employment status of both Manyam and M. P. D. Nair in September 1951, holding that, as employees of the War Department, they were paid employees of the Crown and thus were not eligible for a seat on the City Council. At the time, this was opposed by both Nair and Manyam, as well as their respective parties. The pair then pointed out that, as civilian employees of the War Department, they were instead governed by the department's Civilian Staff Regulations. Manyam accused the SRA of having "vested interests" and being "afraid of the working class." John Laycock, Legislative Councillor and acting president of the PP, stated then that he had previously not known of Manyam's employment status and that if "eminent people in the Federation" could run for the council, Manyam could too. He opined that it was "high time that the regulations or law concerned were amended."

The Straits Times reported then that "expert opinion" differed on the matter, though the War Office permitted its Singapore employees to contest in City Council elections. The council's president held that Manyam and Nair's positions were "not [offices] of emolument under the Crown in the Colony." The SRA held that the Municipal Ordinance was "ambiguous on this point" and announced that it would seek further legal advice on the matter. However, following Manyam's expulsion, Laycock began pushing a bill by February that would amend the Election and Municipal Ordinances to officially have Nair, Manyam and the other ACSU councillors be disqualified and to allow for legal action to be taken against them. Manyam stated that a "lot of trouble and time could have been spared" if Laycock and the other legislative councillors had been "more precise in the legislature" on the ordinances, and considered this a "belated move originated from certain Capitalists in power". Though the Bill was passed by the Legislative Council, SRA president Tan Chin Tuan stated that the association would not seek a High Court ruling on the matter, stating that it only wished to "draw the attention of the public to what we consider is not right."

=== 1953 election ===
==== Background ====
In September, Manyam and Stella had returned to the SLP, with the latter being elected to its General Council. Manyam himself became an ex-officio member of the council. The SLP had, by then, suffered severely from in-fighting, particularly between the factions led by P. M. Williams and president Lim Yew Hock, culminating in the latter's expulsion. In 1952, the party fielded four candidates and only won one, losing one seat. A 'rebel' group of the party refused to accept this, viewing the General Council as being increasingly dominated by Williams and his group and continuing to recognise Lim as president. All the party's City Councillors, save for P. R. Williams, A. R. Lazarous and now Manyam, were aligned with the 'rebel' group, as was M. P. D. Nair. This faction eventually split from the SLP entirely. The party had previously announced in July that it intended to contest all six wards in the upcoming election, to be held in December.

SLP secretary E. S. Moorthy revealed at the end of September, however, that they had thus far only decided on fielding Manyam, whose term was to end with that election, as the party's candidate for the North Ward. Mak, who had recently rejoined the SLP after leaving in 1951, was to run in the East Ward as an independent. He had not been permitted to run on the party ticket as he did not meet the requirements, though he was to receive the party's support and the SLP would not field a candidate there. The Singapore Standard then reported that it was expected that the SLP would contest in the South and Rochore Wards in addition to the North Ward. The SLP was to announce the rest of the candidates following the 14 October meeting of its General Council. However, Moorthy announced after that that the party had "deferred [their] decisions", and The Straits Times believed that the SLP would not name any more candidates.

A meeting was also convened that month to deliberate calling on C. R. Dasaratha Raj, the sole SLP member on the Legislative Council, to resign his seat in October. This was in protest of his non-inclusion from the Rendel Commission. Disapproving of the meeting, SLP president T. D. Richards resigned with treasurer Karim Dzafir and General Council members George Joshua and Mohamed Said Alias. The meeting was attended by just six members of the council, Moorthy, Stella, Chew Seng, Lee Yong Min, Ong Eng Kheng and V. P. Abdullah, as well as ex-officio members, Manyam and Lazarous. This was just enough to form a quorum, and the council voted to call on Raj to resign. Raj then opined that the Labour Party should be wound up as he felt that it was "non-existent." A resolution was moved in response to suspend Raj from the party for three months if he did not cease all his "political activities in the Colony".

==== Campaign ====
Manyam was ultimately left the sole candidate running on the SLP ticket in the election, though Mak, as well as S. M. Hussain and V. Mariappan, ran as independent Labour candidates. Mariappan ran for M. P. D. Nair's former seat in the South Ward. In the North Ward, he faced two opponents: Lim Choo Sye of the PP, who had contested that ward in 1952 and lost to Lazarous, and Syed Harun Alhabshi of the local UMNO branch. Manyam published an eight-point manifesto on 7 November proclaiming that he would fight to prevent wastage of public funds, in addition of advocating for City Council employees and for more locals to be hired as civil servants, as well as a "big grant-in-aid" from the government to be spent on city services and an overhaul of the Municipal Ordinance to "bring it in line with the principles of Socialism." He pledged to "represent faithfully the majority view of the citizens in all their desires and demands."

Manyam challenged Lim and Alhabshi to turn up to an election meeting he was to hold at Farrer Park on 15 November. He asked that they "prove that [he had] not at all times advocated a policy that would benefit the majority." Manyam also criticised Alhabshi's affiliation to both UMNO and the MCA through the alliance due to their "contradictory policies". He then accused the PP candidates of being "stooges" of the government, and the PP as a whole of making the "same promises" since the first elections as they "[lacked] sincerity and imagination." By the end of the month, he had held five election meetings in the ward. At one of them, however, The Straits Times reported that the crowd was more invested in a football match held nearby than in Manyam's speech. He also appeared on radio, claiming that he would work toward putting transport, electricity and gas in the control of agencies such that they would be "vested in the people". On the night of 3 December, Manyam was addressing a group of supporters when a police van turned up. He was arrested and taken to the Kandang Kerbau Police Station, where he was held for 45 minutes before he was allowed to leave. He claimed that he was not informed at all about why he had been arrested.

==== Results ====
On election day, Manyam received 1,723 votes, coming in second behind Lim with 2,585, though still ahead of Alhabshi, who received just 405 and thus had to forfeit his election deposit. Of all the Labour candidates in the election, only Mak won his seat, which was formerly held by the PP. The South Ward went to Vasagar of the PP and Rochore went to independent T. A. Simon. On his loss, Manyam proclaimed that only "a rich man [could] hope to become a City Councillor" and that he was a "poor man", though he vowed to contest against the PP in future City Council elections. He also came out against voting by wards in favour of general polling. S. Jaganathan, an independent Labour City Councillor who was previously part of the group of 'rebels' in the SLP against P. M. Williams, claimed that he had heard that Manyam had been disadvantaged in the election as he had been assigned a wild boar as his election symbol. He stated that the latter had complained to him that several Muslims in the ward, particularly those who were illiterate and "[distinguished] candidates purely by their symbols", had not voted for him as the boar was considered taboo in their culture.

=== Labour Party ===
Abdullah was elected the chair of the SLP on 26 December, filling the post which had remained vacant since Richards's resignation. Alongside Moorthy, he pledged to make a "sincere and determined effort" to "revitalise the party in the interests of the working class". Manyam was officially elected a member of the party's General Council, alongside treasurer K. Y. Foong, a leader of the Naval Base Labour Union, C. G. Ramakrishnan and P. S. Dass. The SLP was then in a "parlous condition." According to researcher Saul Rose, nearly every "member of repute" had already resigned or been expelled by then.

==== Labour Front ====
On 1 May 1954, the Singapore Socialist Party (SSP), a rival to the SLP, was officially founded by former members of the latter who had resigned or been expelled, including Thomas, Lim Yew Hock, M. P. D. Nair and Jaganathan. Abdullah accused the SSP of being "neither Socialists nor democrats" and attempting to capitalise on the "goodwill" of the working class towards the local labour movement.

Despite the SLP's previous stance on the SSP, the former party announced that it would be merging with the SSP to form the Labour Front (LF) on 21 August. Three delegates from each party were placed on a committee with "over-all powers". The SLP's representatives on the committee were Abdullah, as well as Victor J. Mendis and C. H. Koh, who had both succeeded Moorthy as secretary, who would later be appointed co-governors of the SLP with Thomas. It was decided that both the SLP and SSP would cease their independent activities and be merged completely by 1 July of the following year. However, the candidates nominated by the LF for the 1955 Singaporean general election drew criticism from the SLP, which considered the list of candidates "injudicious" as it included several who had been members of neither the SLP nor the SSP. The situation worsened when an executive of the LF drew up a constitution and applied to officially register the LF as a political party, with the SLP wing now alleging that the LF had been established only as an "ad-hoc committee" to ensure that the SLP and SSP did not "step on each other's toes" in the upcoming election, and that the LF had now "overstepped its mandate" by registering the LF, thus implying the "dissolution" of both the SLP and the SSP.

The dispute culminated in Manyam, Abdullah, Moorthy, Chew, Ong, Ramakrishnan and Lee Yong Min of the General Council voting in early November to withdraw from the LF, demanding that Koh and Mendis resign their seats on the LF's governing committee. The council then accused the LF's executive committee of having hidden "their real interests." Lee was elected by the council to act as the general secretary. As Mendis refused to resign from the LF, claiming that the withdrawal had the "effect of not only prejudicing but seriously hampering the cause of the masses", the six on the General Council voted to expel him. The Straits Times viewed this as the "death" of the SLP.

==== Tenure as president ====
At a general meeting on 15 January 1955, it was decided that the SLP would contest in the upcoming general election, to be held on 2 April. The SLP was also to function as a division of the Pan-Malayan Labour Party, adopting the latter's constitution, and all of the members who had failed to withdraw from the LF were to be expelled. Manyam was elected to succeed Abdullah as chair and Lee, who had been serving as secretary in the interim, was confirmed in the post. The meeting was attended by about 100 members, though several more attempted to enter the meeting hall for lacking an invitation to the event and were thrown out as "intruders". They alleged that not every SLP member of the SLP had received an invitation, though Lee rejected this and SLP's leaders called the police on them. Manyam then proclaimed that the SLP would aim to provide members of the MCP with amnesty as a means of bringing a peaceful resolution to the Malayan Emergency, opining that negotiations with the Communists should be done "with a view to win them over to the democratic and constitutional ways of life which they were accustomed to before going underground."

The SLP initially decided, at a meeting on 2 February, to contest five of the 25 seats on the Legislative Assembly up for grabs. Lee was to contest in the Geylang Division, where he had unsuccessfully run on the SLP ticket thrice. A. A. K. Surattee, the SLP vice-president, was also announced as the SLP's candidate in the Pasir Panjang Division and the rest of the candidates were to be named in the next fortnight. The SLP then announced that it would consider allying with "certain political groups", though it remained "hostile" to the LF. However, on 24 February, Manyam announced that Surrattee had decided to withdraw and that the party would not be naming any more candidates, leaving Lee the sole candidate in the election running on the SLP ticket, though the party also planned to support independents Raj in the Kampong Kapor and C. S. Soh in the Havelock Divisions.

In March, Manyam issued an election manifesto for the SLP calling for "immediate" independence, the unification of Singapore and the Federation, the repealing of Emergency Regulations as part of the Malayan Emergency, an overhaul of the Trade Unions Ordinance and the promotion of industrialisation and multilingualism, as well as for government-funded compulsory education up to the age of 16, unemployment benefits and pensions. Lee ultimately came third in the election, with Mak, who was now running with the LF, winning the seat. The LF performed the best out of any party in the election by far, winning 10 seats, with the PP coming in second with just four. With Lee's loss, the SLP lost all of its representation on the Legislative Assembly of Singapore. Manyam continued to serve as president until his death, and no one was elected to succeed him, making him the last to serve in that post. The SLP failed to re-register on the passing of the Societies Ordinance in 1960, thus officially ceasing to exist.

== Personal life and death ==
Manyam married Stella Williams, the sister of P. M. Williams and P. R. Williams. Also a Socialist and a teacher, she came to be a member of the General Council of the SLP in addition to running for City Council as an independent in 1952. The couple had three children; three daughters and one son. The family was residing at 447 River Valley Road as of early 1952. In the middle of July 1949, Manyam left Singapore on a two-month long holiday in Ceylon, where he was to have talks with union leaders. However, on his arrival, he was taken away by customs officers and searched. He was then told to avoid "addressing any public meeting." He claimed to have found that letters sent to him from his wife back home in Singapore had been "intercepted." He returned to Singapore after just over a month due to this. In May 1952, Manyam and Lee Yong Min were elected the vice-presidents of the Singapore Workers' Education Association, under Lazarous as president and alongside Moorthy and P. M. Williams as secretary and treasurer, respectively.

Manyam was reportedly "almost a chain smoker." He bought an electric eel named Elmer from a local dealer for $500; the eel was believed to be the only one of its kind in Malaya. He was then offered $700 for Elmer, though he rejected this, stating that he "would not even part Elmer for $1,000." In mid-June 1953, Manyam took the lead in The Singapore Standard's World Tour popularity contest for Malaya, then into its fifth week. He had been ninth the week before, and when the coupons from the City Council employees were entered, he jumped to first with 6,920, ahead of Kuala Lumpur sprinter N. M. Vasagam. Manyam also received "strong support" from Selangor. The week after, he fell to third, behind Vasagam and Manicasothy Saravanamuttu, the Ceylonese Commissioner for Malaya, who had taken the lead.

In February 1955, Manyam founded and became the general secretary of the Singapore Improvement Trust Tenants' Association (SITTA), which pledged to "act as a representative body on behalf of its members in all negotiations." SITTA's founding president See Thoe Hin claimed that the association had reached out to community centres and welfare associations, seeking their support, and that the association's membership already numbered 600. Manyam announced that SITTA was to pursue a "co-operative" scheme to erect houses, farms and factories. T. R. Fernandez, secretary of the Delta Ganges Welfare Association, opined that SITTA was "unnecessary" as the SIT was "taking good care" of its tenants. He noted that SITTA had been formed "without the knowledge or support" of 90% of SIT tenants, and that Manyam was not himself a tenant or subtenant of the SIT, calling Manyam's statements "fruitless propaganda."

After a brief illness, Manyam died at the Singapore General Hospital on 4 June, after having been admitted to hospital the week before over "heart trouble." He was survived by Stella and their three children. Commenting on his passing, Lee Yong Min called it a "great loss to the working people of the Colony" and to the local labour movement as a whole, stating that he was "always devoted to the welfare of the wage earners [and] was constantly fighting to improve their working conditions." His funeral was held the day after, the cortège leaving his home at 427 River Valley Road for the Church of Our Lady of Lourdes, after which it was taken to the Bidadari Cemetery, where the last rites were held, conducted by Father Ignatius John Aloysius. He was then buried there. The procession was attended by a crowd of over 500, which included War Department Employees, union leaders, City Councillors and members of the Legislative Assembly.
