= Guok Sing Inn =

Singaporean businessman (1915–1953)

- 郭成人
- Photograph of Guok released by the police
- Born: 1915; Rochore, Singapore, Straits Settlements
- Died: 31 December 1953 (aged 38); Jervois Road, Colony of Singapore
- Cause of death: Shot to death
- Resting place: Bidadari Cemetery
- Occupations: Businessman; politician
- Political party: Independent
- Children: 4

Guok Sing Inn (Chinese: 郭成人; 1915 – 31 December 1953) was a Singaporean businessman and politician. He studied at St. Andrew's School and was involved in the transportation industry, having served as the manager of the Hock Lee Bus Company and the director of the Chinese Bus Owners' Association. At the 1953 City Council election, he unsuccessfully stood in Rochore Ward as an independent candidate. On 31 December 1953, Guok was shot to death at the Hock Lee Bus Company's offices at Jervois Road. His murder was linked to a trend of communist-related crime in Singapore, being the sixth related incident that year.

== Biography ==
=== Life and career ===
Guok was born in 1915 in Rochore, Singapore, then a part of the Straits Settlements. He studied at St. Andrew's School and passed his Cambridge Special Certificate (Senior) examinations with the Malayan Seminary in late 1935. He was reportedly of Hockchia descent. Guok initially worked in the government sector, being employed with the Chinese Protectorate. From 1937 to 1942, he worked in Muar, Malaya, as a court interpreter; he spent some time in this role during the Japanese occupation of Malaya. After the war, Guok had a brief stint with the British Military Administration before leaving to head the Hock Lee Bus Company, which had been developed by his family. He was also involved in business and worked in the transport industry.

In January 1952, as director of the Chinese Bus Owners' Association, Guok clarified that passengers had to pay by section, not by mileage, when taking buses. He added that it would be impossible for a bus driver "to remember where a passenger boards or alights" especially when "[carrying] 40 or more passengers". In October 1953, he announced his candidacy for that year's upcoming City Council election, due to be held in December. He planned to contest Rochore Ward, where he was born and lived in, as an independent candidate. If elected, he planned to establish more parks, markets, clinics, welfare centres, and a children's library. Guok published his manifesto in November, where he pledged to "serve the people for a better Singapore".

At the election, he contested against independents T. A. Simon and Syed Mumtaz Hussain in Rochore. His campaign symbol was a chicken. The Singapore Free Press wrote that there "promises to be a close fight" between the three candidates. The city councillor Sim Beng Seng supported Guok. In a discussion on whether symbols should be allowed in campaigns, Guok stated that he learnt from Indian constituents while canvassing the word for his symbol, chicken, in Tamil. In the results, Guok was unsuccessful, placing third with 1,493 votes while Simon was elected with 1,607 votes. Guok was married and had four children.

=== Murder ===
On 31 December 1953, at 11.20am (SST), Guok was in his office taking a phone call at the Hock Lee Bus Company's premises on Jervois Road when three gunmen cycled to the premises. One of them stood outside, pointing a gun at the guard, while the other two went inside. Inside the premises, one of the two gunmen entered Guok's office and the other stood immediately outside. Guok was shot three times and died from his wounds soon after an ambulance arrived. Red pamphlets, which stated that communists had marked him for death due to a "blood debt in Muar", were scattered over Guok's body by the gunmen. Over 100 police officers began searching the Tanjong Pagar area, but no arrests were made.

The director of the special branch A. E. G. Blades stated that the murder "[reminds] the public that the communists are still with us". Guok's murder was also the sixth incident related to communist activity in Singapore that year, following five other deaths. Blades further said that Guok's recent participation in the City Council election had no connection to his murder. On 1 January 1954, a funeral was held for Guok that was attended by several city councillors. He was buried at Bidadari Cemetery. An arrest was made that same morning. The police then announced a reward of S$20,000 for any information relating to the case.

The "blood debt" was believed to have originated from Guok's time as a court interpreter in Muar. Jackie Sam of The Straits Times wrote in 1985 that communism was widespread in the post-war period, with the communists interested in targeting workers to disrupt services, with Hock Lee being one of them. In response, the Guok family used secret societies to oppose the communists; the former were said to be "ultra-rightists". Sam stated that Guok's murder was a retaliation by the communists. According to the historian Thum Ping Tjin, the Hock Lee Bus Company was "notorious for exploiting workers", such that when Guok was murdered, the police were overwhelmed with the large number of people with motives.
