= 1950 Singapore Municipal Commission election =

- 2 December 1950

6 of the 18 elected seats in the Municipal Commission
- Turnout: 55.07%
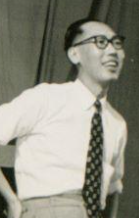

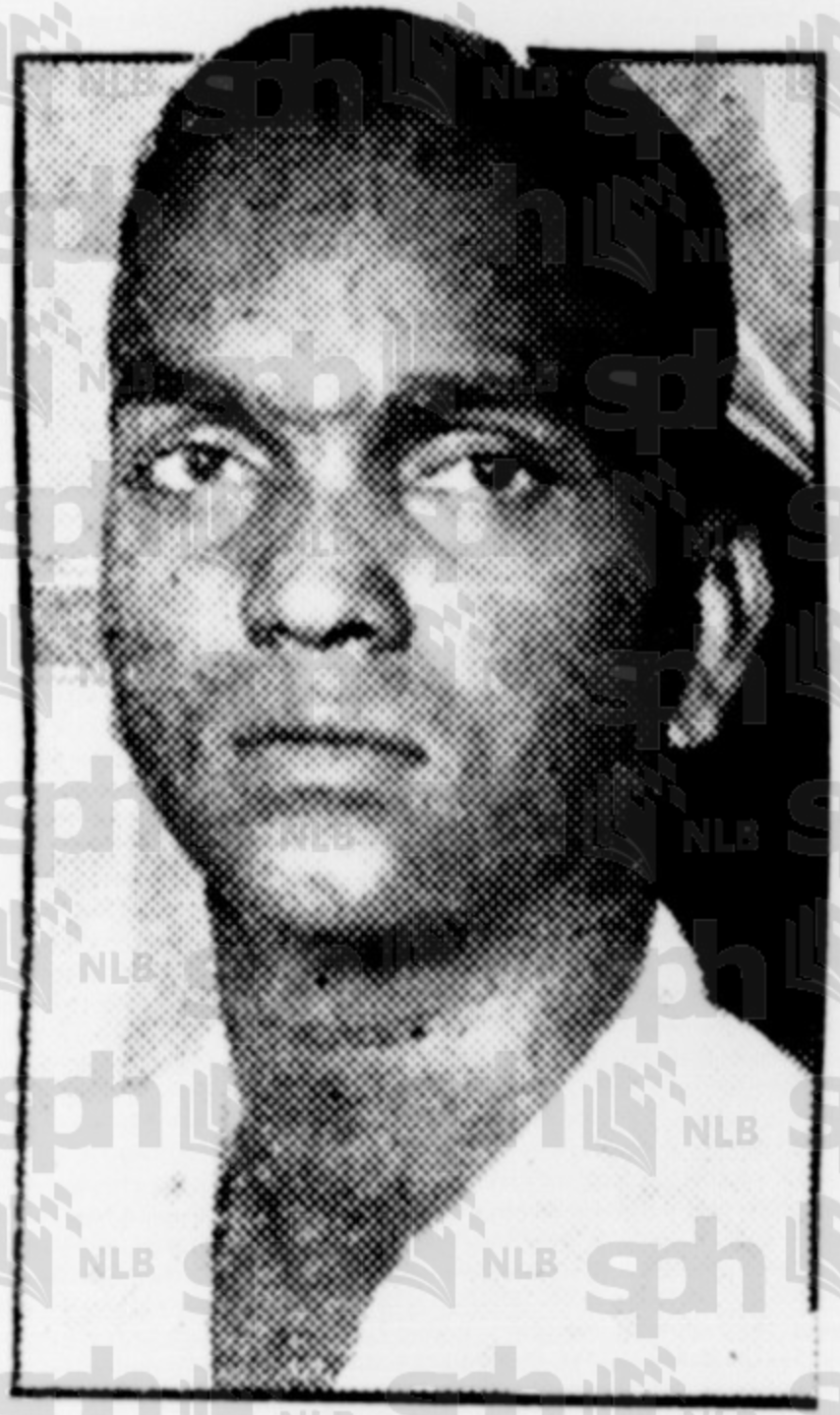
	First party	Second party
Leader	Tan Chye Cheng	Peter Williams
Party	Progressive	Labour
Leader's seat	Did not contest	Did not contest
Seats before	12	2
Seats won	3	1
Seats after	9	3
Seat change	▼3	▲1
Popular vote	3,902	4,793
Percentage	32.41%	39.81%

The 1950 Singapore Municipal Commission election took place on 2 December 1950 to elect 6 of the 27 seats in the Singapore Municipal Commission.

== Results ==
Party	Votes	%	Seats				
Party	Votes	%	Total before	Won	Not up	Total after	+/–
Labour Party	4,793	39.81	2	1	2	3	+1
Progressive Party	3,902	32.41	12	3	6	9	–3
Independents	3,345	27.78	4	2	4	6	–2
Total	12,040	100.00	18	6	12	18	0
Valid votes	12,040	97.93					
Invalid/blank votes	254	2.07					
Total votes	12,294	100.00					
Registered voters/turnout	22,325	55.07					
Source: Singapore Elections

=== By constituency ===
Constituency	Electorate	Party	Candidate	Votes	%
City	3,372	Independent	Jumabhoy Mohamed Jumabhoy	732	37.6
City	3,372	Independent	Jiwanbhai Mehta Jamnadas	710	36.4
City	3,372	Independent	Mak Pak Shee	259	13.3
City	3,372	Labour Party	Mirza Abdul Majid	248	12.7
East	3,962	Progressive Party	Frank Caulfield James	1,464	70.6
East	3,962	Labour Party	Lee Yong Min	610	29.4
North	3,261	Progressive Party	Shunmugh Subra Manyam	836	56.6
North	3,261	Labour Party	Rajaratnam Vaithilingam	640	43.4
Rochore	4,872	Independent	Sena Ana Mohamed Ali	1,182	49.6
Rochore	4,872	Labour Party	Caralapati Raghaviah Dasaratha Raj	1,005	49.3
Rochore	4,872	Independent	M. Abdul Rahim Khan	28	1.2
South	4,754	Labour Party	Madai Puthan Damodaran Nair	1,871	65.8
South	4,754	Progressive Party	Chan Kum Chee	974	34.2
West	2,104	Progressive Party	Soh Ghee Soon	628	47.9
West	2,104	Independent	Elizabeth Choy	434	33.1
West	2,104	Labour Party	Yap Chin Poh	249	19.0
Source: Singapore Elections
