= Frank Caulfield James =

English-Singaporean politician and teacher

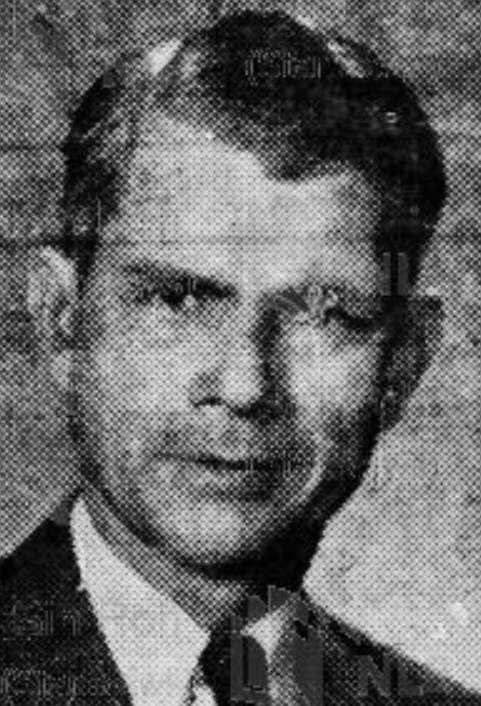
James in 1950

Frank Caulfield James (1902 — 12 May 1973) was a member of the Municipal Commission of Singapore, the leader of the Singapore Progressive Party and a teacher.

== Early life and education ==
James was born in 1902 in Bangkok. He was the son of Joseph Caulfield James, the principal tutor to Prince Vajiravudh of Siam. He was sent to Singapore as his father wanted him to learn English when the only foreign language taught in Bangkok was French. He attended the Convent of the Holy Infant Jesus (CHIJ) and St. Joseph's Institution.

== Career ==
At the age of 15, he began teaching at St. Joseph's Institution. He was able to do so as the authorities forgot to check his date of birth prior to appointing him as a teacher. He began teaching at St. Joseph's Institution in 1916 and attended teacher training at Raffles Institution. In 1932, James went to teach at Saint Patrick's School.

During the Japanese occupation of Singapore, he was appointed by the Japanese as the headmaster of the Koon Seng Road Boys' School but was demoted to a teacher after failing his Japanese test. Following the end of the Japanese occupation, he was transferred to St. Anthony's School. He was also appointed Inspector of Aided Schools. He continued to teach at the school until 1952, when he went on a seven-month trip to Ireland with his wife. After returning to Singapore, he was transferred to St. Joseph's Institution. He was also the president of the Singapore Teachers' Association. He retired on 7 April 1966 and left for England.

James was elected a member of the Municipal Commission of Singapore representing East Ward in the April 1949 Singapore Municipal Commission election. He was a member of the Singapore Progressive Party. He was reelected in the 1950 Singapore Municipal Commission election. In February 1953, he succeeded Arumugam Ponnu Rajah as the leader of the party. In October, he withdrew from the 1953 Singapore City Council election for health reasons.

After returning to England, he was employed at several local examination boards as a part-time examiner. He also taught English to foreign students at a technical college.

== Personal life and death ==
James married Iris Ess, who was principal of CHIJ, in July 1931. They had two daughters and a son.

James returned to Bromley, England in 1966.

He died at the Beckenham Hospital in Beckenham, Kent, on 12 May 1973 after suffering a stroke on 8 May. Following his death, the Christian Brothers' Old Boys' Association established the Frank C. James Memorial Scholarship Fund in memory of him.
