= 1953 Singapore City Council election =

- 5 December 1953

6 of the 18 elected seats to the Singapore City Council
- Turnout: 49.44%
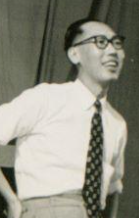

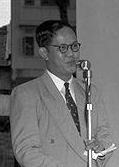
	First party	Second party
Leader	Tan Chye Cheng	Lim Yew Hock
Party	Progressive	Labour
Leader's seat	Did not contest	Did not contest
Seats before	8	7
Seats won	3	0
Seats after	9	5
Seat change	▲1	▼2
Popular vote	8,532	1,723
Percentage	40.52%	8.18%

The 1953 Singapore City Council election was the 3rd election to the Singapore City Council. It was held on 5 December 1953 to elect 6 of the 18 seats in the City Council.

== Results ==
Party	Votes	%	Seats				
Party	Votes	%	Total before	Won	Not up	Total after	+/–
Progressive Party	8,532	40.52	8	3	6	9	+1
Labour Party	1,723	8.18	7	0	5	5	–2
United Malays National Organisation	1,622	7.70	0	0	0	0	New
Independent	9,177	43.59	3	3	1	4	+1
Total	21,054	100.00	18	6	12	18	0
Valid votes	21,054	97.80					
Invalid/blank votes	473	2.20					
Total votes	21,527	100.00					
Registered voters/turnout	43,538	49.44					
Source: Singapore Elections

=== By constituency ===
Constituency	Electorate	Party	Candidate	Votes	%
City	6,700	Independent	Jumabhoy Mohamed Jumabhoy	Uncontested	
East	9,726	Independent	Mak Pak Shee	2,164	51.4
East	9,726	Progressive Party	Syed Hassan Al-Junied	1,409	33.5
East	9,726	United Malays National Organisation	Syed Esa Almenoar	634	15.1
North	9,759	Progressive Party	Lim Choo Sye	2,585	54.8
North	9,759	Labour Party	Shunmugh Subra Manyam	1,723	36.6
North	9,759	United Malays National Organisation	Syed Haron A. Alhabshi	405	8.6
Rochore	9,445	Independent	T. A. Simon	1,607	34.8
Rochore	9,445	Independent	Syed Mumtaz Hussain	1,516	32.8
Rochore	9,445	Independent	Guok Sing Inn	1,493	32.3
South	10,048	Progressive Party	Manickvasagar Subramaniam	2,801	53.9
South	10,048	Independent	Mariappan Verappan	2,397	46.1
West	4,560	Progressive Party	Soh Ghee Soon	1,737	74.9
West	4,560	United Malays National Organisation	Cuthbert Francis Joseph Ess	583	25.1
Source: Singapore Elections
