= 1959 PAP prime ministerial election =

- 30 May 1959

12 votes from the Central Executive Committee of PAP (excluding the Chairman)
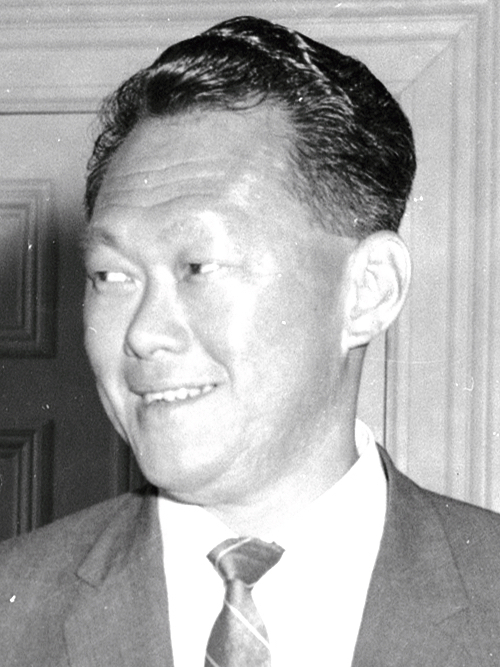
| Candidate | Lee Kuan Yew | Ong Eng Guan |
| Party | PAP | PAP |
| Popular vote | 6 + TCC | 6 |
| Percentage | 50% | 50% |
Elected Prime Minister
Lee Kuan Yew
PAP

The 1959 People's Action Party (PAP) prime ministerial election was an internal vote conducted by the party's Central Executive Committee (CEC) following the PAP's victory in the 1959 Singaporean general election. The 12-member committee was evenly split between two contenders, Ong Eng Guan and Lee Kuan Yew, each receiving six votes. The deadlock was broken when the party chairman, Toh Chin Chye, cast the tiebreaker in favour of Lee, securing his appointment as Singapore's first Prime Minister.

== Candidates ==
=== Lee Kuan Yew ===
On 12 November 1954, Lee Kuan Yew and a group of fellow English-educated, middle-class professionals, whom he wryly referred to as "beer-swilling bourgeois," founded the centre-left People's Action Party (PAP). The party was formed through a pragmatic alliance with pro-communist Chinese-speaking trade unionists. Lee later described this partnership as a "marriage of convenience" because the English-speaking leaders needed the mass support of the Chinese-speaking grassroots, while the communists, constrained by the illegality of the Malayan Communist Party (MCP), sought a legal political front.

At the time, nearly 70 percent of Singapore's population spoke Chinese or Chinese dialects as their first language, while native English speakers made up only about 20 percent, placing the English-educated elite in the minority. Despite their ideological differences, both factions were united by a common goal: to achieve self-government and the end of British colonial rule in Singapore. An inaugural conference was held at the Victoria Memorial Hall, attended by over 1,500 supporters and trade unionists. Lee was made secretary-general.

=== Ong Eng Guan ===
A staunch anti-communist and treasurer of the PAP, Ong Eng Guan was a Chinese-educated orator and one of the party's founding members. He was particularly well known among Singapore's Chinese community. In the 1957 Singapore City Council election, Ong was elected mayor after the PAP secured 13 out of the 32 contested seats. The remaining 19 seats were split among various opposition parties, allowing the PAP to form a majority.

Ong, although despising communism, had a strong anti-colonial stance which surprised the British authorities. His fiery speeches made City Council meetings a popular spectacle for the public. He remained in charge of the council for two years, until 1959, when the PAP formed the government and the City Council was subsequently dissolved.

== Results ==
Summary of the Singapore PAP Prime Ministerial Election results
| Candidate | Party | Votes | Percentage (%) |
|---|---|---|---|
| Lee Kuan Yew | People's Action Party | 6+TCC | 50.00 |
| Ong Eng Guan | People's Action Party | 6 | 50.00 |
| Valid votes | | 12 | 100.00 |
| Rejected votes | | 0 | 0.00 |
| Total vote cast | | 12 | 100.00 |

== Aftermath ==
The aftermath of the vote exposed underlying tensions within the party, particularly between the English-educated leadership and the Chinese-speaking grassroots faction, which Ong represented. Despite being appointed Minister for National Development in the first Cabinet, Ong became increasingly critical of the party leadership and its direction. In 1960, he resigned from the Cabinet and was shortly after expelled from the PAP after filing "16 resolutions" against Lee's leadership, accusing him of failing to seek party consensus when deciding policy, not adhering to anti-colonialism and suspending left-wing unions, among other accusations.

Ong resigned his seat in 1961 and won a by-election at Hong Lim as an independent candidate in April that year, proving his continued popularity among segments of the electorate. The fallout extended beyond Ong's departure. In July, Lee tried to resign after another by-election defeat at Anson but was urged to stay by Toh, and immediately tabled a confidence motion where thirteen party members abstained; those who abstained were ultimately expelled, leading to the formation of the leftist Barisan Sosialis (BS). PAP's majority shrank to a narrow one seat in the Legislative Assembly, forcing Lee to tighten party discipline and consolidate internal cohesion by purging dissenting factions.

Ong did not join BS but instead founded his own political party, the United People's Party (UPP). However, his influence waned over the following years, and he eventually retired from politics and public life in 1965. Ultimately, Lee overcame all internal challenges and would go on to lead Singapore as Prime Minister until 1990 and as Secretary-General of the PAP until 1992, becoming widely regarded as the founding father of modern Singapore.
