= Toh Chin Chye =

Singaporean politician (1921–2012)

Toh Chin Chye DUNU
- 杜进才
- Toh in 1959

1st Deputy Prime Minister of Singapore
- In office 5 June 1959 – 2 August 1968
- Prime Minister: Lee Kuan Yew
- Preceded by: Abdul Hamid Jumat (as Deputy Chief Minister)
- Succeeded by: Goh Keng Swee

1st Leader of the House
- In office 5 June 1959 – 15 April 1968
- Prime Minister: Lee Kuan Yew
- Preceded by: Office established
- Succeeded by: E. W. Barker

1st & 3rd Chairman of the Central Executive Committee of the People's Action Party
- In office 20 October 1957 – 8 January 1981
- Preceded by: Tan Chong Kim
- Succeeded by: Ong Teng Cheong
- In office 21 November 1954 – 13 August 1957
- Preceded by: Position established
- Succeeded by: Tan Chong Kim
Ministerial offices
Minister for Health
In office 2 June 1975 – 5 January 1981
Prime Minister	Lee Kuan Yew
Preceded by	Chua Sian Chin
Succeeded by	Goh Chok Tong
Minister for Science and Technology
In office 16 April 1968 – 1 June 1975
Prime Minister	Lee Kuan Yew
Preceded by	Office established
Succeeded by	Lee Chiaw Meng
Parliamentary offices
Member of the Malaysian Parliament for Singapore
In office 2 November 1963 – 9 August 1965
Preceded by	Position established
Succeeded by	Position abolished
Member of the Singapore Parliament for Rochore Constituency (Note: Formerly the Legislative Assembly from 1959 to 1965.)
In office 30 May 1959 – 17 August 1988
Preceded by	Constituency established
Succeeded by	Constituency abolished

Personal details
- Born: Toh Chin Chye; 10 December 1921 Batu Gajah, Perak, Federated Malay States, British Malaya
- Died: 3 February 2012 (aged 90) Greenview Cresent, Bukit Timah, Singapore
- Resting place: Mandai Crematorium and Columbarium
- Party: People's Action Party
- Spouse: Florence Yeapp Sui Phek (m. 1962; died 2004)
- Children: Toh Ai Chu (adopted) (died 2009)
- Education: Raffles College; University of London (PhD); National Institute for Medical Research

Toh Chin Chye (Note: Chinese: 杜进才; Pe̍h-ōe-jī: Tō͘ Chìn-châi; pinyin: Dù Jìncái) DUNU (10 December 1921 – 3 February 2012) was a Singaporean statesman and academic. He was a founding member of the People's Action Party (PAP), the dominant political party in Singapore since independence. Toh played a significant role in Singapore's early political development and was instrumental in shaping the country's post-independence governance. Toh is widely recognised as one of the founding fathers of modern Singapore.

Toh served as Deputy Prime Minister from 1959 to 1968, holding other key cabinet positions including Minister for Science and Technology between 1968 and 1975 and Minister for Health from 1975 to 1981. Alongside his ministerial roles, he was Chairman of the PAP from 1954 until 1981, as well as Leader of the House from 1959 to 1968. His contributions extended into academia, serving as Vice-Chancellor of the University of Singapore (now the National University of Singapore) between 1968 and 1975.

Toh served as the Member of Parliament (MP) for the Rochore Constituency throughout his political life from 1959 to 1988. After resigning from the Cabinet in 1981, Toh continued as an MP on the backbenches. During this period, he became known for his candid criticism of his own political party.

== Early life and career ==
Toh was born in Batu Gajah, Perak. He received his early education at St George's Institution in Taiping and the Anglo-Chinese School in Ipoh before enrolling at Raffles College (now the National University of Singapore), where he graduated in 1946 with a diploma in science. He later pursued postgraduate studies at the University of London and was awarded a PhD in physiology from the National Institute for Medical Research in 1953.

Toh began his professional career as an academic and was appointed a reader in physiology at the University of Singapore (now the National University of Singapore) from 1958 to 1964. He later served as the university’s Vice-Chancellor between 1968 and 1975, a period during which he concurrently held the Cabinet post of Minister for Science and Technology.

== Political career ==
"Once you are in the front edge of administration, there'll be barbs and arrows. Don't expect roses. I never expected roses."

Toh became politically active during his time as a university student in London, when he served as Chairman of the Malayan Forum, an anti-colonial group for students from Malaya and Singapore, where they met regularly for discussions and debates on the future of the Malayan region. He was among the founding members of the People's Action Party (PAP) and served as the party's chairman from its formation in 1954 until 1981. During a brief period in 1957, however, the leftists in the party, who then dominated the common membership, took over the party leadership. The founding members were subsequently restored when many leftist leaders were arrested by Chief Minister Lim Yew Hock during his anti-communist crackdown. This allowed for the return of the original "basement group" of Toh, Lee Kuan Yew, Goh Keng Swee, et al. to the party's Central Executive Committee (CEC). To prevent similar takeovers, Toh introduced a cadre system that restricted the influence of newcomer "ordinary members", including leftist sympathisers, on the CEC's composition. He was a key ally and loyalist of Lee in internal party struggles.

Toh stood as the PAP candidate in Rochore during the 1959 general election and won. After the PAP's electoral victory, the party's CEC voted on whether the Secretary-General, Lee, or the party's Treasurer, Ong Eng Guan, who had served as Mayor of the City Council from 1957 to 1959, should become the first Prime Minister. The vote was tied, and Toh, as Chairman, cast the deciding vote in favour of Lee. A staunch opponent of the Barisan Sosialis, a party formed by former PAP members, Toh defeated its chairman Lee Siew Choh by only 89 votes in the 1963 general election, marking his narrowest electoral victory. He held several Cabinet positions both before and after Singapore's independence, including Deputy Prime Minister (1959 to 1968), Minister for Science and Technology (1968 to 1975), and Minister for Health (1975 to 1981). Concurrently, he served as Vice-Chancellor of the University of Singapore between 1968 and 1975, where he reoriented the university towards national development goals. While his efforts were supported by some, he was also criticised for taking an authoritarian stance, particularly in his suppression of student activism.

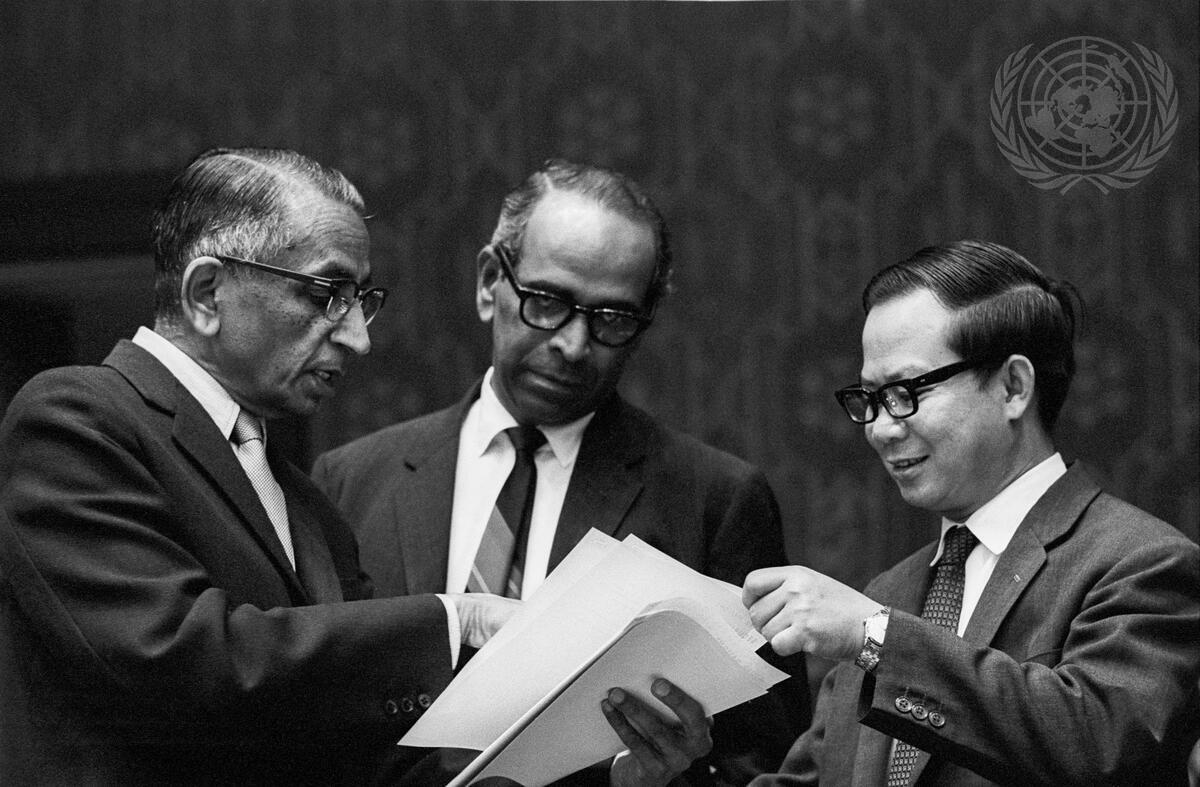
Singapore Foreign Minister S. Rajaratnam and Deputy Prime Minister Toh Chin Chye are discussing documents related to Singapore’s accession to the United Nations, assisted by Radhakrishna Ramani, Permanent Representative of Malaysia to the UN.

Toh stepped down from Cabinet and as party Chairman in 1981 but continued to serve as a Member of Parliament for two more terms. As a backbencher, he was outspoken and frequently criticised his own party, including voicing opposition to the proposed increase of the Central Provident Fund (CPF) withdrawal age from 55 to 60. He retired from politics at the 1988 general election.

== Personal life ==
=== False hit-and-run accusation ===
In 1996, a front-page article in Singaporean tabloid The New Paper claimed that Toh had killed a pedestrian in a hit-and-run accident while driving drunk. The actual perpetrator was a different man also called Toh Chin Chye, one of nine people sharing the name in Singapore. The reporter who filed the story was fired, with two newsroom editors demoted, and the paper paid Toh $300,000 in damages.

=== Retirement ===
Toh spent his last years away from the public eye. The Straits Times featured Toh twice, in 2005 and 2006 respectively, once on 2 May 2005, where he was seen being assisted by two men and a walking stick as he walked to pay his last respects to former President Wee Kim Wee. In February 2006, Toh was featured in The Straits Times again, paying his last respects to the late former Deputy Prime Minister S. Rajaratnam at his home in Chancery Lane.

== Death and legacy ==
Toh died in his sleep at his home in Greenview Crescent, Bukit Timah on 3 February 2012 at 9:30am Singapore Standard Time (UTC+08:00). He was 90 years of age. He is survived by his son-in-law and four grandchildren aged 4 to 15. He was given a private funeral according to his wishes on 7 February 2012 at the Mandai Crematorium. As a mark of respect for his contributions to Singapore, his coffin was draped in the national flag and borne on a ceremonial gun carriage to the crematorium. State flags at all Government buildings were flown at half-mast on the day of his funeral.

=== Contributions ===
Toh was generally considered one of the founding fathers of Singapore that came along with Lee Kuan Yew, Goh Keng Swee and S. Rajaratnam, among others, for helping to lead Singapore during the nation's formative years.

Majulah Singapura was chosen by Toh as the national anthem of Singapore. In 1959, he headed the team that designed the coat of arms and state flag of Singapore.

== Honours ==
Toh was conferred the Order of Nila Utama (First Class) in 1990.

== Notes ==
Political offices
Preceded by None, New post	Deputy Prime Minister of Singapore; 5 June 1965 – 2 August 1968	Succeeded by Goh Keng Swee
Preceded by Yong Nyuk Lin	Minister for Health; 2 June 1975 – 5 January 1981	Succeeded by Howe Yoon Chong
Party political offices
New political party	Chairman of the People's Action Party; 1954 – 1981	Succeeded by Ong Teng Cheong
Academic offices
Preceded by Lim Tay Boh	Vice-Chancellor of the National University of Singapore; 1968 – 1975	Succeeded by Kwan Sai Kheong
