= Central Executive Committee (People's Action Party) =

Executive of the Singaporean People's Action Party

- 37th Central Executive Committee

Type
- Type: Unicameral
- Established: 1957; 69 years ago

Leadership
- Secretary-General: Lawrence Wong since 4 December 2024

Structure
- Seats: 18
- Length of term: 2 years

Elections
- Voting system: Cadre system
- Last election: 25 October 2026
- Next election: By October 2028

The Central Executive Committee (CEC) is the highest executive committee within the People's Action Party (PAP) and its "inner circle". The internal concentration of power in the PAP is vested in the CEC, headed by the secretary-general, the highest-ranking position in the party.

From the 1950s, up until 1984, most of Singapore's influential leaders were members of the CEC, as well as the Cabinet of Singapore and the Armed Forces Council.

The election of the CEC through "the PAP cadre system" has been described as a closed system in which "the cardinals appoint the pope and the pope appoints the cardinals".

== Formation ==
The PAP's organisational structure has Leninist roots whereby a group of elite PAP members known as cadres, elect 18 CEC members from a list of candidates. Originally when this structure was organised in 1957, the outgoing committee will recommended a list of candidates for the next CEC. This has been changed recently so that the CEC nominates eight members and the party caucus selects the remaining ten.

The cadre system was started in 1957 by Toh Chin Chye, in an effort to prevent the popular leftist faction of the PAP, which dominated the party during its infant years, at the grassroots level and many of its committees and composed much of its early membership, from ever taking control of the CEC again.

Prior to 1957, every party member could vote in the CEC elections. This had resulted in the leftists taking control of the CEC on 9 August 1957, with the original founders (the "Peranakan Circle") losing control. After Chief Minister Lim Yew Hock's crackdown on many of the leftist leaders in the CEC in 1957, as well as many non-PAP leftist leaders, the "Peranakan Circle" regained control of the CEC.

== First generation dynamics ==
The core of the PAP, the members of the first generation CEC began much of their chemistry as a basement group in Lee Kuan Yew's house. S. Rajaratnam described the CEC's tight-knit dynamics as a small jazz band, where "each musician plays the same melody, but is with considerable latitude in the precise manner in which he backs up the others". Although party elections caused various members to enter and leave—overlooking the brief 1957 loss of power to the leftists—the core of the first generation of the CEC remained roughly the same for several election cycles up until 1984.

Lee Kuan Yew was the core and firm centre of the CEC, providing "forceful leadership", in the words of political scientist Tilman. However, Tilman argues that he was not the strongman of the political system as is wont to be found in many developing nations, as Lee could be opposed "cautiously" by other CEC members if dissent or resistance to Lee's policies became necessary.

Most internal disputes within the CEC were confined to the CEC. Generally, the team would work out a consensus in the Prime Minister's Office; contentious issues were often resolved by Lee's one-on-one discussions with individual CEC members. Having been previously resolved informally, the debates that the CEC would carry out before any of the "institutional policy-making forums" (e.g. Parliament) were thus mostly ceremonial. At these forums, the CEC would exhibit total unity. Differences in the CEC rarely emerged as part of a larger group; dissenting CEC members would voice their dissent in private to Lee Kuan Yew.

== Old Guard ==
The following are members of the first-generation (1G) team, most commonly known as the "Old Guard":

- Lee Kuan Yew (1923–2015)
- S. Rajaratnam (1915–2006)
- Toh Chin Chye (1921–2012)
- Goh Keng Swee (1918–2010)
- Devan Nair (1923–2005)
- Othman Wok (1924–2017)
- Ahmad Ibrahim (1927–1962)
- Jek Yeun Thong (1930–2018)
- Chor Yeok Eng (1930–2016)
- Ong Pang Boon (1929–)
- Yong Nyuk Lin (1918–2012)

== Current members ==
As of 05 November 2026, the Central Executive Committee comprises the following members:
Title	Name
Chairperson	Desmond Lee
Vice-chairperson	Masagos Zulkifli
Secretary-General	Lawrence Wong
Assistant Secretary-General	Chan Chun Sing
Treasurer	Ong Ye Kung
Assistant Treasurer	Chee Hong Tat
Organising Secretaries	Grace Fu
Organising Secretaries	Edwin Tong
Assistant Organising Secretaries	Alex Yam
Assistant Organising Secretaries	Desmond Tan
Assistant Organising Secretaries	Dinesh Vasu Dash
Members	K. Shanmugam
Members	Indranee Rajah
Members	Chan Hui Yuh
Members	Ng Chee Meng
Members	Tan See Leng
Members	Vivian Balakrishnan
Members	Sim Ann
Members	Lee Hsien Loong
Members	Zaqy Mohamad
Members	Jeffrey Siow

== See also ==
- Cabinet of Singapore
