= Pragmatic conservatism =

Strand of conservatism

Pragmatic conservatism is a political ideology which refers to making decisions based on current situations, while maintaining elements of conservative policy. It espouses the idea that while tradition and customs are important, reforms and decisions are sometimes necessary to protect them, and to reflect on the needs and changes of the times.

== Associated politicians ==
In British politics, Edmund Burke and Michael Oakeshott are two conservatives who have been described as pragmatic. During his time as a Member of Parliament, Edmund Burke viewed politics as rigid, he had the view that traditional values would be best protected by allowing some inevitable changes to take place. Oakeshott stated that to be pragmatic within conservatism is to take on board what is in people's best interests, to create stability within society and avoid chaos.

According to journalist Rory Carroll, writing in The Guardian, Republican politician Ronald Reagan was pragmatic throughout his time as President of the United States and governor, making compromises while still maintaining his conservative position.

== See also ==
- Conservatism
- Iranian pragmatists
- Progressive conservatism
- People's Action Party (Singapore)
