= Goh Keng Swee =

Former Deputy Prime Minister of Singapore

Goh Keng Swee DUT
- 吳慶瑞
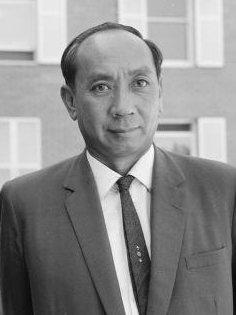
- Goh in 1967

2nd Deputy Prime Minister of Singapore
- In office 20 March 1973 – 1 January 1985 Serving with S. Rajaratnam (1980–1985)
- Prime Minister: Lee Kuan Yew
- Preceded by: Toh Chin Chye
- Succeeded by: Goh Chok Tong; Ong Teng Cheong

Chairman of the Monetary Authority of Singapore
- In office August 1980 – December 1997
- Prime Minister: Lee Kuan Yew
- Preceded by: Hon Sui Sen
- Succeeded by: Richard Hu

Minister for Education
- In office 12 February 1979 – 2 January 1985
- Prime Minister: Lee Kuan Yew
- Preceded by: Chua Sian Chin
- Succeeded by: Tony Tan

Minister for Defence
- In office 11 August 1970 – 11 February 1979
- Prime Minister: Lee Kuan Yew
- Preceded by: Lim Kim San (as Minister for Interior and Defence)
- Succeeded by: Howe Yoon Chong

Minister for Finance
- In office 17 August 1967 – 10 August 1970
- Prime Minister: Lee Kuan Yew
- Preceded by: Lim Kim San
- Succeeded by: Hon Sui Sen
- In office 5 June 1959 – 8 August 1965
- Prime Minister: Lee Kuan Yew
- Preceded by: Office established
- Succeeded by: Lim Kim San

Minister for Interior and Defence
- In office 9 August 1965 – 16 August 1967
- Prime Minister: Lee Kuan Yew
- Preceded by: Office established
- Succeeded by: Lim Kim San

Member of the Malaysian Parliament for Singapore
- In office 2 November 1963 – 9 August 1965
- Preceded by: Position established
- Succeeded by: Position abolished

Member of the Singapore Parliament for Kreta Ayer
- In office 30 May 1959 – 4 December 1984
- Preceded by: Constituency established
- Succeeded by: Richard Hu (PAP)

Personal details
- Born: Robert Goh Keng Swee; 6 October 1918 Malacca, Straits Settlements
- Died: 14 May 2010 (aged 91) Singapore
- Resting place: Mandai Crematorium and Columbarium
- Party: People's Action Party
- Spouse(s): Alice Woon (m. 1942, div. 1986); Phua Swee Liang (m. 1991)
- Children: Goh Kian Chee (son)
- Relatives: Goh Hood Keng (uncle); Tan Cheng Lock (maternal uncle); Tan Siew Sin (maternal cousin)
- Education: London School of Economics (BSc, PhD)

Military service
- Branch/service: Singapore Volunteer Corps
- Years of service: 1939–1942
- Rank: Colonel (Note: Honorary, and during his tenure as the civilian head of the Ministry of the Interior and Defence. He oversaw the establishment of the Singapore Armed Forces (SAF) after 1965, a process that laid the foundation built primarily on National Service (NS) from 1967.)
- Unit: 20th People's Defence Force

Goh Keng Swee (Note: Chinese: 吴庆瑞; Pe̍h-ōe-jī: Gô͘ Khèng-sūi; pinyin: Wú Qìngruì) DUT (born Robert Goh Keng Swee; 6 October 1918 – 14 May 2010) was a Singaporean statesman and economist who served as the second Deputy Prime Minister of Singapore between 1973 and 1985. Goh is widely recognised as one of the founding fathers of modern Singapore.

Goh was a member of the People's Action Party (PAP), which has governed the country continuously since independence. He was also a prominent member of the first generation of political leaders following Singapore's independence in 1965. He served as Minister for Finance from 1959 to 1965 and again from 1967 to 1970. He was Minister for Interior and Defence between 1965 and 1967, Minister for Defence from 1970 to 1979 and Minister for Education from 1979 to 1985. Throughout his entire political career, he represented the constituency of Kreta Ayer.

As Minister for Interior and Defence, Goh's main objective was to strengthen the country's military and domestic security capabilities after the British had withdrawn its troops from Singapore, which made the newly independent nation vulnerable. A key policy was the creation of National Service (NS), a mandatory conscription system for able-bodied young males. Prime Minister Lee Kuan Yew had mentioned that he had wanted conscription of both men and women, similar to Israel. However, Goh rejected it, arguing that the labour cost at least in its initial years would be too great for the newly independent nation.

During Goh's tenure as Minister for Finance, he declined to allow the central bank to issue currency, favouring instead a currency board system as this would signal to citizens, academics and the financial world that governments cannot "spend their way to prosperity"; the Monetary Authority of Singapore (MAS) was later established in 1971. In 1981, Goh also expressed the view that the central bank need not hold large amounts of cash in reserve to defend the currency, proposing that the Government of Singapore Investment Corporation (GIC) be established to invest excess reserves. At the time, it was unprecedented for a non-commodity-based economy to have such a sovereign wealth fund. Goh died in 2010 at the age of 91, and he was accorded a state funeral.

== Early life and career ==
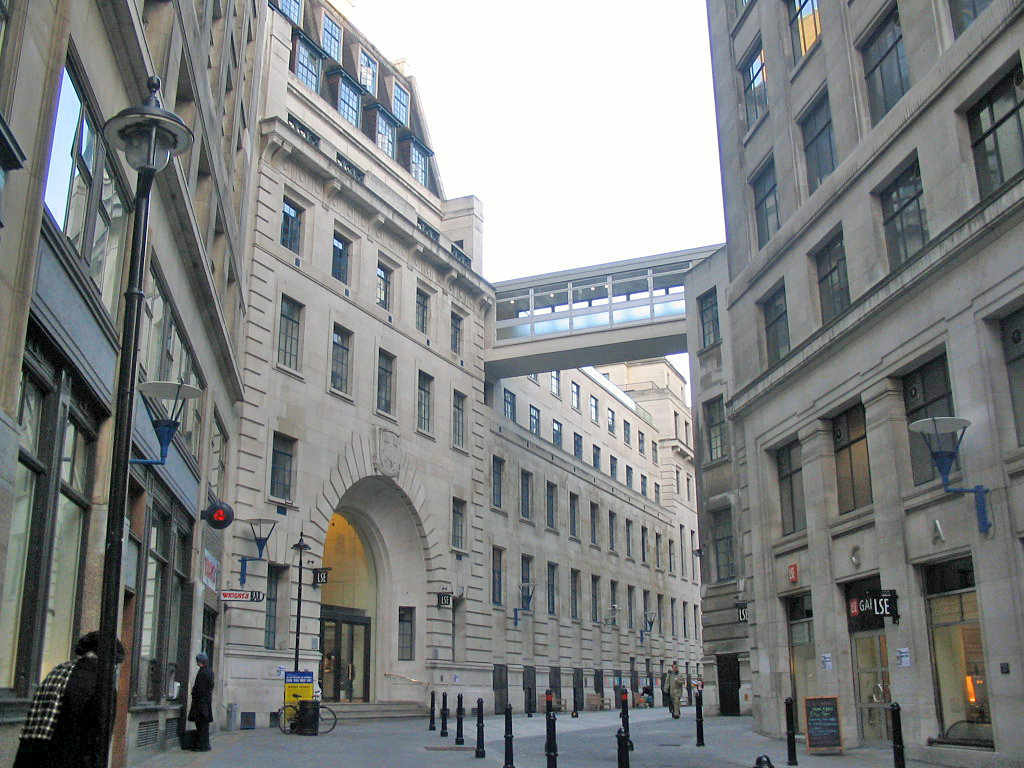
London School of Economics, where Goh Keng Swee spent six years studying at (1948–51, 1954–56), photographed in January 2005.

Goh was born in Malacca on 6 October 1918, then a part of the Straits Settlements, into a middle class Peranakan family and the fifth of six children. His father Goh Leng Inn was a manager of a rubber plantation, while his mother Tan Swee Eng, came from the family that produced the Malaysian politicians Tan Cheng Lock and his son, Tan Siew Sin, who would later become Goh's lifelong political opponent.

Goh was given the Christian name Robert, which he disliked and refused to respond to. When he was two years old, his family moved from Malacca to Singapore where his maternal grandparents owned several properties. The Gohs later relocated to the Pasir Panjang rubber estate when his father found work there and became manager in 1933. Like many Peranakan families, the Gohs spoke both English and Malay at home; church services were held at home on Sundays in Malay. Goh's father Leng Inn and his brothers-in-law Chew Cheng Yong and Goh Hood Keng taught at the Anglo-Chinese School and were involved in the Middle Road Baba Church, where Hood Keng was pastor. Goh attended the church as well.

Goh attended the Anglo-Chinese School between 1927 and 1936, where he ranked second in his class in the Senior Cambridge examinations. He graduated from Raffles College (now the National University of Singapore) in 1939 with a Class II Diploma in Arts, with special distinction in economics. After graduation, Goh joined the colonial Civil Service as a tax collector with the War Tax Department, though his superiors noted he was not very good at the job and he was nearly dismissed. Shortly after the start of the Second World War, he joined the Singapore Volunteer Corps, a local militia, but returned to his previous work after the fall of Singapore. In 1942, Goh married Alice Woon, a secretary and colleague, and they had one son, Goh Kian Chee, two years later. After the Japanese occupation ended, Goh moved his family back to Singapore in 1946 and joined the Department of Social Welfare, becoming a supervisor of its Research Section six months later.

Goh earned a scholarship to study at the London School of Economics. While in London, he met fellow students seeking independence for British Malaya, including Abdul Razak, Maurice Baker, Lee Kuan Yew and Toh Chin Chye. He was founding chairman of the Malayan Forum, a student discussion group formed in 1948. Goh graduated in 1951 with a first class honours in economics and won the William Farr Prize for the highest marks in statistics. Returning to the Department of Social Welfare, he was appointed Assistant Secretary of Research. In 1952, together with fellow civil servant Kenneth Michael Byrne, he formed the Council of Joint Action to oppose salary and promotion policies favouring Europeans over Asians. Byrne later became Minister for Labour and Minister for Law. Goh returned to the London School of Economics in 1954 for doctoral studies, supported by a University of London scholarship. He completed his PhD in economics in 1956, and returned to the Department of Social Welfare, serving as assistant director and then Director. In 1958, he became Director of the Social and Economic Research Division in the Chief Minister's Office before resigning from the civil service in August to work full-time for the People's Action Party (PAP).

== Political career ==
=== Pre-independence ===
Goh was a key member of the PAP's Central Executive Committee (CEC), and serving as vice-chairman.

Goh contested in Kreta Ayer during the 1959 general election and won. He was subsequently elected into the Legislative Assembly on 30 May 1959, and appointed Minister for Finance under Prime Minister Lee Kuan Yew's first Cabinet.

As Minister for Finance, Goh assumed the stewardship of Singapore's economy. As a budget deficit of S$14 million was forecast that year, he introduced stringent fiscal discipline which included cutting civil service salaries. As a result of these measures, he was able to announce at the end of the year when delivering the budget that the government had achieved a surplus of $1 million.

Goh initiated the setting up of the Economic Development Board (EDB) which was established in August 1961 to attract foreign multinational corporations to invest in Singapore. The next year, he started the development of the Jurong industrial estate on the western end of the island which was then a swamp, offering incentives to local and foreign businesses to locate there. According to former Permanent Secretary Sim Kee Boon, Goh admitted that the Jurong project was "an act of faith and he himself jokingly said that this could prove to be Goh's folly". Nonetheless, Goh also felt strongly that "the only way to avoid making mistakes is not to do anything. And that... will be the ultimate mistake."

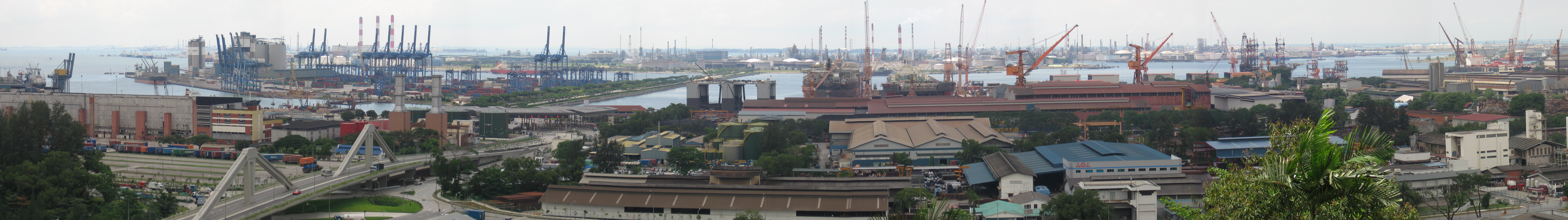
Jurong Industrial Estate with Jurong Island in the background, photographed in November 2006.

In the 1960s, there were great pressures from communist agitators working through Chinese-medium schools and trade unions. Divisions existed within the PAP as well, with a pro-communist faction working to wrest control of the party from the moderate wing, of which Goh and Lee Kuan Yew were key members. A key source of division was the issue of merger with Malaya to form a new state of Malaysia. Goh and his fellow moderates believed this was a necessary condition for Singapore's economic development because Malaya was a key economic hinterland; merger would also provide an alternate vision against communism for Singapore's Chinese majority. In July 1961, 16 members of the pro-communist faction broke away from the PAP to form the Barisan Sosialis, and captured control of the main trade unions.

=== Federation of Malaysia ===
In 1961, the Singapore Government secured approval from Malaysian Prime Minister Tunku Abdul Rahman for a merger, motivated in part by the Tunku's desire to stabilise the security situation in Singapore and to counter the perceived communist threat by the Malayan Communist Party. In 1963, Singapore joined Malaya, along with Sabah and Sarawak, to form the Federation of Malaysia.

However, the merger soon proved problematic for Singapore's leaders. Fundamental disagreements emerged over political and economic principles, particularly the issue of Malay dominance. Communal tensions escalated into violence in 1964, incited by both Malay and Chinese activists in Singapore. According to Lee, Goh played a key role in safeguarding Singapore's interests, especially in economic disputes with the Malaysian Minister of Finance and his own cousin Tan Siew Sin, whom he believed acted in hostility toward Singapore.

After two difficult years within the Federation, Lee asked Goh to negotiate with Malaysian Deputy Prime Minister Tun Abdul Razak and Minister for External Affairs Ismail Abdul Rahman in July 1965. The aim was to explore the possibility of a looser arrangement for Singapore within Malaysia. However, following the discussions, all parties concluded that a clean break would be in the best interests of both sides. Tunku Abdul Rahman ultimately agreed to this course of action, paving the way for Singapore's separation from Malaysia.

Goh maintained a secret dossier that he codenamed "Albatross", which contains files and notes from the months leading up to Singapore's independence. According to one of the file's documents, authored by Goh himself, Goh chose not to follow Lee's orders to negotiate for a "looser arrangement" but only ever broached separation with Tunku. Writing in his memoirs, Lee claimed that he only realised that Goh "never pressed Razak for a looser rearrangement as I had asked him to" in 1994.

=== Post-independence ===
==== Minister for Interior and Defence (1965–1967) ====
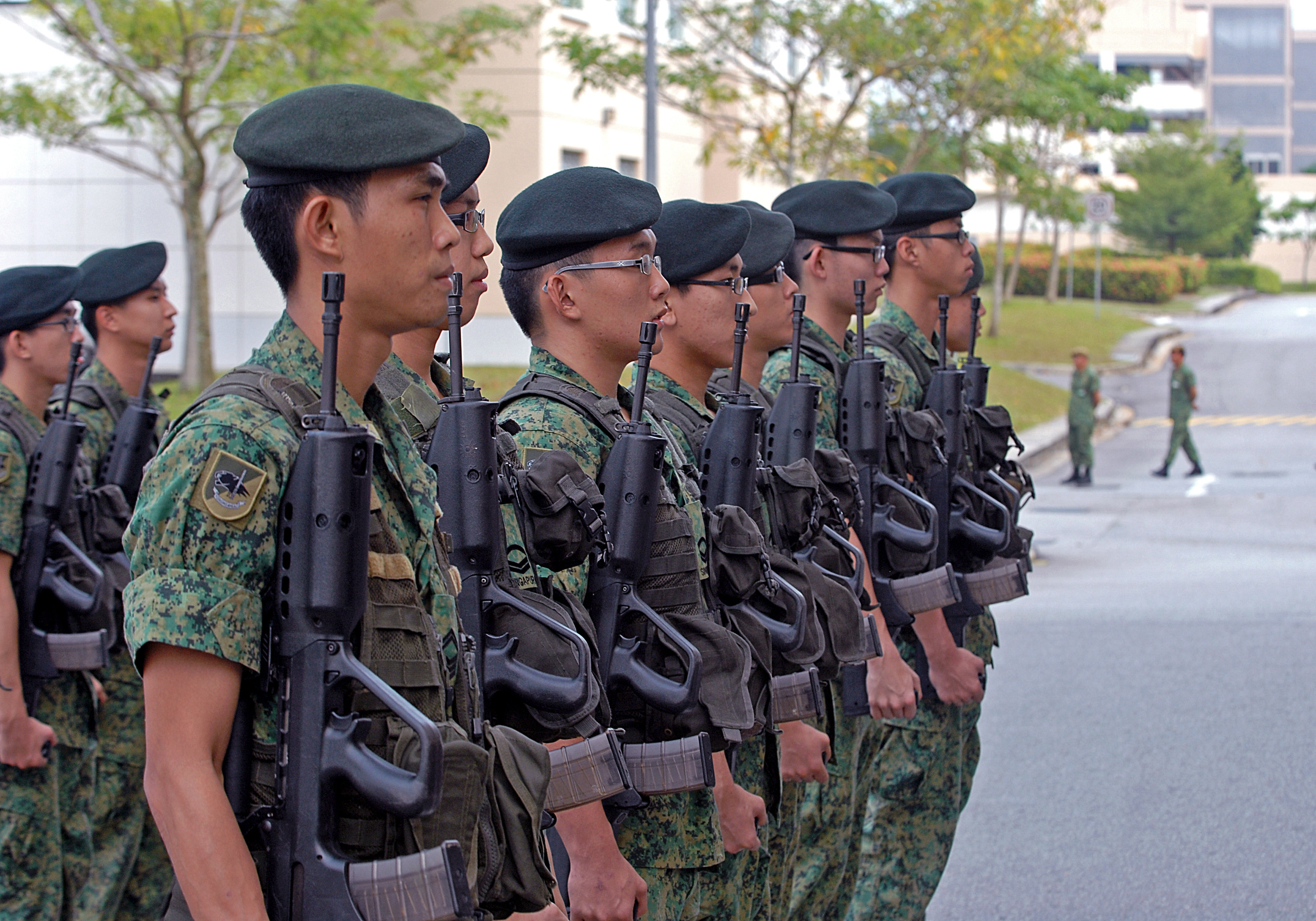
Infantry soldiers of the Singapore Army awaiting the arrival of the deputy commanding general of the Army National Guard, United States Army Pacific, for a joint military exercise in July 2009. Mandatory conscription was initiated by Goh when he was Minister for Interior and Defence.

Upon the independence of Singapore in 1965, Goh relinquished his portfolio of Minister for Finance and became Minister for Interior and Defence in 1967, assuming responsibilities for strengthening Singapore's military and domestic security capabilities. A key policy was the creation of National Service, a mandatory conscription system for able-bodied young males.

==== Minister for Finance (1967–1970) ====
Goh served as Minister for Finance again between 1967 and 1970, during which he declined to allow the central bank to issue currency, favouring instead a currency board system in the form of the Board of Commissioners of Currency, Singapore, as this would signal to citizens, academics and the financial world that governments cannot "spend their way to prosperity".

==== Minister for Defence (1970–1979) ====
On 11 August 1970, he was reappointed Minister for Defence.

==== Deputy Prime Minister (1973–1984) ====
On 1 March 1973, Goh was appointed Deputy Prime Minister concurrently with his other Cabinet portfolio.

On 12 February 1979, Goh moved on from the Ministry of Defence to the Ministry of Education, where his Goh Report greatly influenced the development of Singapore's education system. He was described as both a key political and strategic leader responsible for the transformation of the system over 30 years from "fair" to "great", according to a November 2010 McKinsey report. He set up the Curriculum Development Institute, and introduced key policies such as religious education—subsequently discontinued and, in 1980, the channelling of students into different programmes of study according to their learning abilities, known as "streaming". Goh served two terms as Minister for Education, his first term ended in 1980, and his second following the 1980 general election from 1981 until his retirement in 1985.

From 1 June 1980, he was redesignated First Deputy Prime Minister upon S. Rajaratnam being made Second Deputy Prime Minister, and served as Chairman of the Monetary Authority of Singapore until he stepped down from Parliament on 3 December 1984, at the age of 66.

In a tribute to mark the occasion, Prime Minister Lee Kuan Yew wrote: "A whole generation of Singaporeans take their present standard of living for granted because you had laid the foundations of the economy of modern Singapore."

=== Other contributions ===
==== Government of Singapore Investment Corporation (GIC) ====
In 1981, Goh expressed the view that the central bank need not hold large amounts of cash in reserve to defend the currency, proposing that the Government of Singapore Investment Corporation (GIC) be established to invest excess reserves. At the time, it was unprecedented for a non-commodity-based economy to have such a sovereign wealth fund. The foreign merchant bank, Rothschild, advised on the GIC.

==== Defence Science Organisation (DSO) ====
In 1971, Goh put together the Electronic Warfare Study Group, a team of newly graduated engineers who had excelled in their university studies that was headed by Tay Eng Soon, then a university lecturer. The group worked on Project Magpie, a secret project to develop Singapore's defence technology capabilities. In 1977, the group was renamed the Defence Science Organisation (DSO). Originally part of the Ministry of Defence, the organisation became a non-profit corporation called DSO National Laboratories in 1997.

==== Cultural, sports and recreation ====
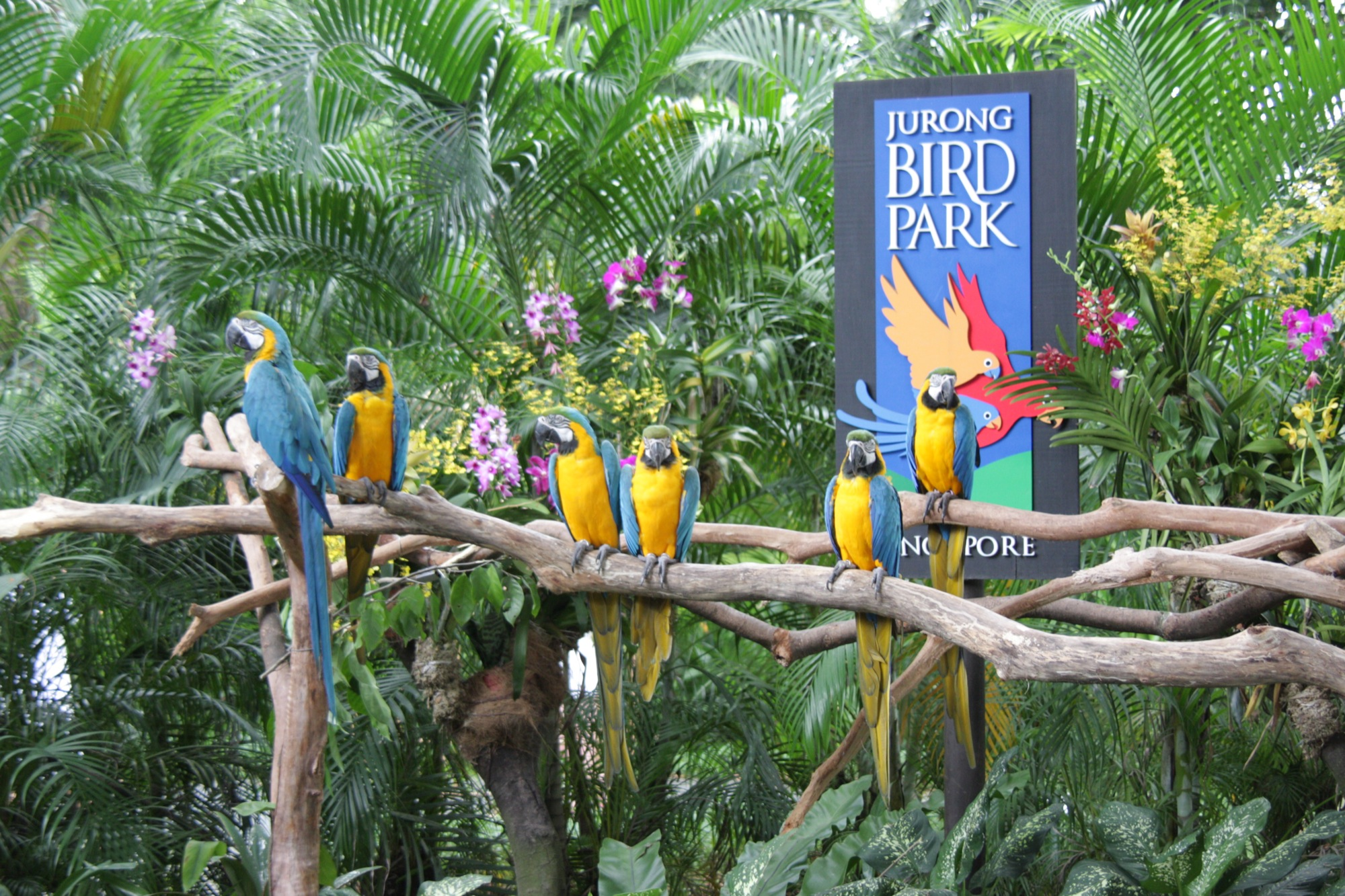
The Jurong Bird Park was one of Goh's many projects

Goh was also responsible for projects that sought to improve Singaporeans' cultural and leisure life, such as the Jurong Bird Park, Singapore Zoo and the Singapore Symphony Orchestra.

He backed the construction of the Kreta Ayer People's Theatre in his constituency as a venue for Chinese opera performances. In 1968, Goh encouraged the establishment of the Institute of Southeast Asian Studies.

Goh was also instrumental in introducing rugby in the Singapore Armed Forces and later in schools. In recognition of his role in promoting the sport, the Schools "C" Division Cup is named after him.

Impressed by an oceanarium in the Bahamas, he contacted the Sentosa Development Corporation and persuaded them to build an oceanarium in Singapore. Underwater World opened in 1991.

== Personal life ==
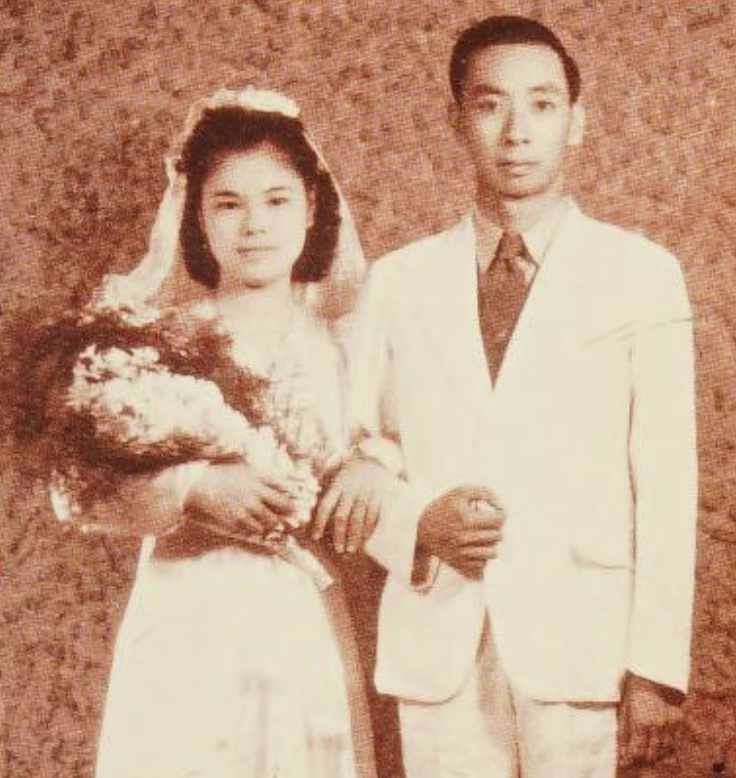
Goh with his first wife Alice Woon in 1942

In 1986, Goh divorced his first wife Alice. In 1991, he married his former Ministry of Education colleague Phua Swee Liang.

Goh suffered his first stroke in 1999, and a subsequent one in 2000 which affected the vision in his right eye. According to Goh's daughter-in-law Tan Siok Sun, the medical condition caused him to become withdrawn and introverted. In July 2007, Tan published a biography titled Goh Keng Swee: A Portrait. Goh's second wife issued a statement claiming that Goh had not been consulted on the book and had indicated to her that he did not want any book to be written about him. "Therefore, the publication of this book is contrary to his wishes, and is a show of disregard and utmost disrespect to him." In an interview with The Straits Times, Tan said she did not start the dispute between Mrs. Goh and herself, nor did she wish to prolong it.

After retirement from politics, Goh continued to be active in public life, serving as Deputy Chairman of GIC between 1981 and 1994, Economic Adviser to the State Council of the People's Republic of China on Coastal Development and Adviser on Tourism in 1985, Deputy Chairman of the Monetary Authority of Singapore between 1985 and 1992, Chairman of the Singapore Totalisator Board between 1988 and 1990, Director of Gateway Technologies Services Pte. Ltd. from 1991 onward, Adviser to the United Overseas Bank Group from 1993 onward, Chairman of N. M. Rothschild & Sons (Singapore) Ltd. from 1994 onward, and vice-chairman of Hong Leong Asia Ltd. from 1995 onward.

Goh was also chairman of the Board of Governors of the Institute of East Asian Philosophies between 1983 and 1992, which was founded to study Confucianism. The institute later turned its focus on China's political and economic development, renaming itself the Institute of East Asian Political Economy, and Goh continued as Executive Chairman and chairman of the Board of Governors until 1995. In April 1997, the institute was reconstituted as the East Asian Institute, an autonomous research organisation under the auspices of the National University of Singapore.

== Death ==
On 14 May 2010, Goh died in the early morning at his home in Dunbar Walk off East Coast Road in Siglap, at the age of 91. His death was as a result of his old age and pneumonia.

His body lay in state at Parliament House from 20 to 22 May, and there was a state funeral on 23 May 2010 at the Singapore Conference Hall followed by a private ceremony for family members at the Mandai Crematorium.

The latter was conducted by the pastor-in-charge of Barker Road Methodist Church, with a message delivered by the Bishop of the Methodist Church in Singapore, Robert M. Solomon. As a mark of respect, State flags at all Government buildings were flown at half-mast from 20 to 23 May.

== Honours and legacy ==
In 1966, Goh was made an Honorary Fellow of the London school of Economics. In 1972, he was the recipient of the Ramon Magsaysay Award for Government Services, which is often regarded as "Asia's Nobel Prize". It is awarded to people who have demonstrated integrity in government, courageous service to the people, and pragmatic idealism within a democratic society. That same year, the Philippine Government conferred upon him the Order of Sikatuna, which is given to diplomats, officials and nationals of foreign states who have rendered conspicuous services in fostering, developing and strengthening relations between their country and the Philippines.

Following his retirement from politics, Goh was awarded the Order of Temasek (First Class, now known as High Distinction) in 1985, Singapore's highest civilian honour and second overall after the Star of Temasek. He was also presented with the LSE's Distinguished Alumnus Award on 21 January 1989, and made the first Distinguished Fellow of the Economic Development Board Society in 1991. Goh is known as one of Singapore's founding fathers.

During the National Day Rally on 29 August 2010, Prime Minister Lee Hsien Loong announced that the Singapore Command and Staff College, where senior officers of the Singapore Armed Forces receive training; and a complex to be constructed at the Ministry of Education's North Buona Vista Road headquarters for specialist teacher training academies in English language, physical education, sports and the arts would be respectively named the Goh Keng Swee Command and Staff College and the Goh Keng Swee Centre for Education.

== Publications ==
- The Economic Front: From a Malayan Point of View. Singapore: Government Printers. 1940. OCLC 226068826..
- Urban Incomes & Housing: A Report on the Social Survey of Singapore, 1953–54. Singapore: [Department of Social Welfare]. 1956. OCLC 504452751..
- Techniques of National Income Estimation in Under-developed Territories, with Special Reference to Asia and Africa [Unpublished PhD thesis, University of London, London School of Economics, 1956]. London: University of London Library, Photographic Section. 1978. OCLC 63630985..
- This is How Your Money is Spent [Budget statement by Goh Keng Swee, Minister for Finance; Towards Socialism, vol. 3]. Singapore: Ministry of Finance. 1960. OCLC 63838096..
- Some Problems of Industrialisation [Towards Socialism; vol. 7]. Singapore: Government Printing Office. 1963. OCLC 17270555..
- Communism in Non-Communist Asian Countries. Singapore: Printed by the Government Printing Office for the Ministry of Culture. c. 1967. OCLC 433094..
- The Economics of Modernization and other Essays. [Singapore]: Asia Pacific Press. 1972. OCLC 534320.. Later editions:
  - The Economics of Modernization. Singapore: Federal Publications. 1995. ISBN 978-981-01-2317-8..
  - The Economics of Modernization. Singapore: Marshall Cavendish Academic. 2004. ISBN 978-981-210-330-7..
- Some Problems of Manpower Development in Singapore [Occasional publication (Singapore Training and Development Association); no. 1]. Singapore: Ad Hoc Publications Sub-committee, Singapore Training & Development Association. 1974. OCLC 226024028..
- Some Unsolved Problems of Economic Growth [Kesatuan lecture; 1]. Singapore: Kesatuan Akademis Universiti Singapura. 1976. ISBN 9971-68-076-9. OCLC 3072805..
- The Practice of Economic Growth. Singapore: Federal Publications. 1977. OCLC 4465760.. Later edition:
  - The Practice of Economic Growth. Singapore: Federal Publications. 1995. ISBN 978-981-01-2322-2..
- Goh, Keng Swee; Education Study Team (1979). Report on the Ministry of Education 1978. Singapore: Printed by Singapore National Printers. OCLC 416421063..
- Goh, Keng Swee (1995). Low, Linda (ed.). Wealth of East Asian Nations: Speeches and Writings. Singapore: Federal Publications. ISBN 978-981-01-2297-3..

Political offices
Preceded by New post	Minister for Finance; 1959–65	Succeeded by Lim Kim San
Preceded by New post	Minister for Defence; 1965–67	Succeeded by Lim Kim San
Preceded by Lim Kim San	Minister for Finance; 1967–70	Succeeded by Hon Sui Sen
Preceded by Lim Kim San	Minister for Finance; 1970–79	Succeeded by Howe Yoon Chong
Preceded by Chua Sian Chin	Minister for Education; 1979–80	Succeeded by Tony Tan Keng Yam
Preceded by Tony Tan Keng Yam	Minister for Education; 1981–85	Succeeded by Tony Tan Keng Yam
Preceded by Toh Chin Chye	Deputy Prime Minister of Singapore; 1973–85	Succeeded by Goh Chok Tong
Parliament of Singapore
New constituency	Member of Parliament for Kreta Ayer; 1959–84	Succeeded by Richard Hu Tsu Tau

Military offices
New title	1st Director, General Staff of Defence Force; 1965-1967	Succeeded by T. J. D. Campbell
