= People's Action Party =

Singaporean political party

People's Action Party: Parti Tindakan Rakyat (Malay); 人民行动党 (Chinese); Rénmín Xíngdòng Dǎng; மக்களின் செயல் கட்சி (Tamil); Makkaḷin Ceyal Kaṭci
- Abbreviation: PAP
- Chairman: Desmond Lee
- Vice-Chairman: Masagos Zulkifli
- Secretary-General: Lawrence Wong
- Assistant Secretary-General: Chan Chun Sing
- Founders: Lee Kuan Yew; Goh Keng Swee; Toh Chin Chye; S. Rajaratnam; Lim Chin Siong; Fong Swee Suan; C.V. Devan Nair; ... and others
- Founded: 21 November 1954; 71 years ago
- Preceded by: Malayan Forum
- Headquarters: Block 57B New Upper Changi Road #01-1402 Singapore 463057
- Youth wing: Young PAP
- Ideology: Pragmatic conservatism; Communitarianism; Economic liberalism; Singaporean nationalism; Civic nationalism; 1961–1991: Anti-communism (Note: From 1961, became of low importance ever since the unofficial dissolution of the Barisan Sosialis in 1988, the Fall of Communism in 1989 and the end of the Cold War in 1991.); 1954–1976: Democratic socialism (Note: The PAP was officially committed to democratic socialism from its inception in 1954 until its resignation from the Socialist International in 1976.)
- Political position: Centre-right; Until 1960s: Centre-left
- International affiliation: Socialist International (1954–1976)
- Colours: White; Blue (customary)
- Slogan: Changed World, Fresh Team, New Resolve – Securing a Brighter Future for You (Note: As of the 2025 general election.)
- Governing body: Central Executive Committee
- Parliament: 86 / 99 (87%)
- Town Councils: 17 / 19 (89%)

Website
- pap.org.sg (official website) petir.sg (party newspaper)

The People's Action Party (PAP) is a major political party in Singapore. Established in 1954 as a conventional centre-left party, following its initial electoral success in 1959, Prime Minister Lee Kuan Yew sought to reposition the party ideologically toward the centre. In pursuit of this objective, he expelled the party's leftist faction, which reorganised as Barisan Sosialis, in 1961, during the period of Singapore's merger with Malaysia. Over the course of the 1960s and since then, the PAP continued its ideological shift towards the centre-right. After Singapore's separation from Malaysia and subsequent independence in 1965, the majority of opposition parties, excluding the WP, boycotted the 1968 general election. Consequently, the PAP secured all parliamentary seats in that election. In the ensuing decades, the PAP consolidated its political dominance through successive electoral victories, and remains the dominant political party in Parliament, followed by the opposition Workers' Party. It consistently formed the executive branch of government and exerted substantial influence over key national institutions, including the country's sole trade union, the National Trades Union Congress (NTUC), which is affiliated with the party, as well as the civil service.

Between 1965 and 1981, the PAP was the sole political party represented in Parliament. This period of exclusive representation ended with the party's first electoral defeat in a 1981 by-election in the Anson Constituency, where the WP secured the seat. Despite this setback, the PAP has retained its political dominance. In every subsequent general election, the party consistently garnered over 60 percent of the popular vote and secured more than 80 percent of parliamentary seats, achieving landslide victories on each occasion. Having governed continuously for 67 years, the PAP remains the dominant political force in Singapore, effectively operating within the framework of a de facto one-party state. It has maintained an unbroken two-thirds parliamentary supermajority enabling it to amend the Constitution at will. As of 2025, the PAP is the longest-serving uninterrupted ruling party among contemporary multi-party parliamentary democracies and holds the second-longest tenure of any governing party in a multi-party system in modern history, surpassed solely by Mexico's Institutional Revolutionary Party (PRI), which governed from 1929 to 2000.

Positioned on the centre-right of Singapore's political spectrum, the PAP espouses a combination of pragmatic conservatism and economic liberalism. The party generally advocates free-market principles, favouring policies such as low taxation, the absence of tariffs, limited government expenditure relative to gross domestic product (GDP), minimal economic regulation and the promotion of economic freedom. Nonetheless, the PAP occasionally engages in strategic state intervention. A distinctive feature of its economic approach is the support for the development and expansion of state-owned enterprises (SOEs), locally referred to as government-linked corporations (GLCs). These entities were initially established in response to the economic disruptions caused by the British military withdrawal from Singapore in 1971. GLCs played a central role in driving export-oriented industrialisation, fostering economic development and generating employment across key sectors of the economy. On social matters, the PAP endorses communitarian values and civic nationalism. A cornerstone of its social policy is the promotion of national cohesion through the integration of the country's major ethnic groups into a unified Singaporean identity.

== History ==
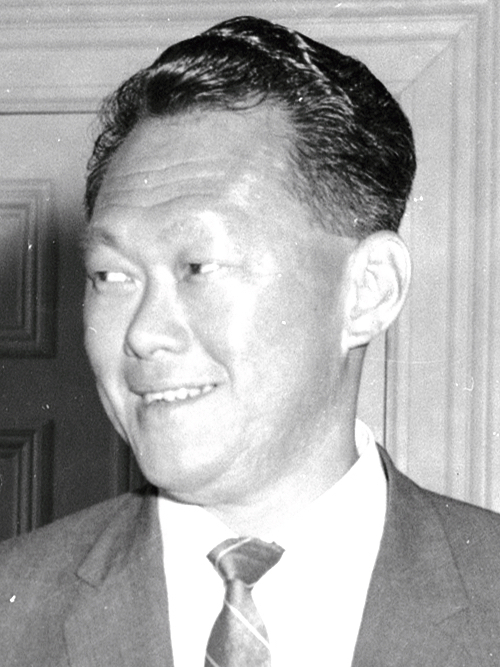
Lee Kuan Yew, the first Prime Minister of Singapore and one of the founders of the People's Action Party

Lee Kuan Yew, Toh Chin Chye and Goh Keng Swee were involved in the Malayan Forum, a London-based student activist group that was against colonial rule in Malaya in the 1940s and early 1950s. Upon returning to Singapore, the group met regularly to discuss approaches to attain independence in Malayan territories and started looking for like-minded individuals to start a political party. Journalist S. Rajaratnam was introduced to Lee by Goh. Lee was also introduced to several English-educated left-wing students and Chinese-educated union and student leaders while working on the Fajar sedition trial and the National Service riot case.

=== Formation ===
The PAP was officially registered as a political party on 21 November 1954. Members of the first Central Executive Committee (CEC) of the party include a group of trade unionists, lawyers and journalists such as Lee Kuan Yew, Abdul Samad Ismail, Toh Chin Chye, Devan Nair, S. Rajaratnam, Chan Chiaw Thor, Fong Swee Suan, Tann Wee Keng and Tann Wee Tiong. The political party was led by Lee Kuan Yew as its secretary-general, with Toh Chin Chye as its founding chairman. Other party officers include Tann Wee Tiong, Lee Gek Seng, Ong Eng Guan and Tann Wee Keng.

The PAP first contested the 1955 general election in which 25 of 32 seats in the legislature were up for election. In this election, the PAP's four candidates gained much support from the trade union members and student groups such as the University Socialist Club, who canvassed for them. The party won three seats, one by its leader Lee Kuan Yew for the Tanjong Pagar division and one by PAP co-founder Lim Chin Siong for the Bukit Timah division. Then 22 years old, Lim was the youngest Assemblyman ever to be elected to office. The election was won by the Labour Front headed by David Marshall.

In April 1956, Lim and Lee represented the PAP at the London Constitutional Talks along with Chief Minister David Marshall which ended in failure as the British declined to grant Singapore internal self-government. On 7 June 1956, Marshall, disappointed with the constitutional talks, stepped down as Chief Minister as he had pledged to do so earlier if self-governance was not achieved. He was replaced by Lim Yew Hock, another Labour Front member. Lim pursued a largely anti-communist campaign and managed to convince the British to make a definite plan for self-government. The Constitution of Singapore was revised accordingly in 1958, replacing the Rendel Constitution with one that granted Singapore self-government and the ability for its own population to fully elect its Legislative Assembly.

PAP and left-wing members who were communists were criticised for inciting riots in the mid-1950s. Lim Chin Siong, Fong Swee Suan and Devan Nair as well as several unionists were detained by the police after the Chinese middle schools riots. Lim Chin Siong was placed under solitary confinement for close to a year, away from his other PAP colleagues, as they were placed in the Medium Security Prison (MSP) instead. The number of PAP members imprisoned rose in August 1957, when PAP members from the trade unions (viewed as "communist or pro-communist") won half the seats in the Central Executive Committee (CEC). The "moderate" CEC members, including Lee Kuan Yew, Toh Chin Chye and others, refused to take their appointments in the CEC. Yew Hock's government again made a sweeping round of arrests, imprisoning all the "communist" members, before the "moderates" re-assumed their office.

Following this, the PAP decided to re-assert ties with the labour faction of Singapore in the hope of securing the votes of working-class Chinese Singaporeans, many of whom were supporters of the jailed unionists. Lee Kuan Yew convinced the incarcerated union leaders to sign documents to state their support for the party and its policies, promising to release the jailed members of the PAP when the party came to power in the next elections. Ex-Barisan Sosialis member Tan Jing Quee claims that Lee was secretly in collusion with the British to stop Lim Chin Siong and the labour supporters from attaining power because of their huge popularity. Quee also states that Lim Yew Hock deliberately provoked the students into rioting and then had the labour leaders arrested. Greg Poulgrain of Griffiths University argued that "Lee Kuan Yew was secretly a party with Lim Yew Hock in urging the Colonial Secretary to impose the subversives ban in making it illegal for former political detainees to stand for election". Lee Kuan Yew eventually accused Lim Chin Siong and his supporters of being communists working for the Communist United Front, but evidence of Lim being a communist cadre was a matter of debate as many documents have yet to be declassified.

=== First years in government ===
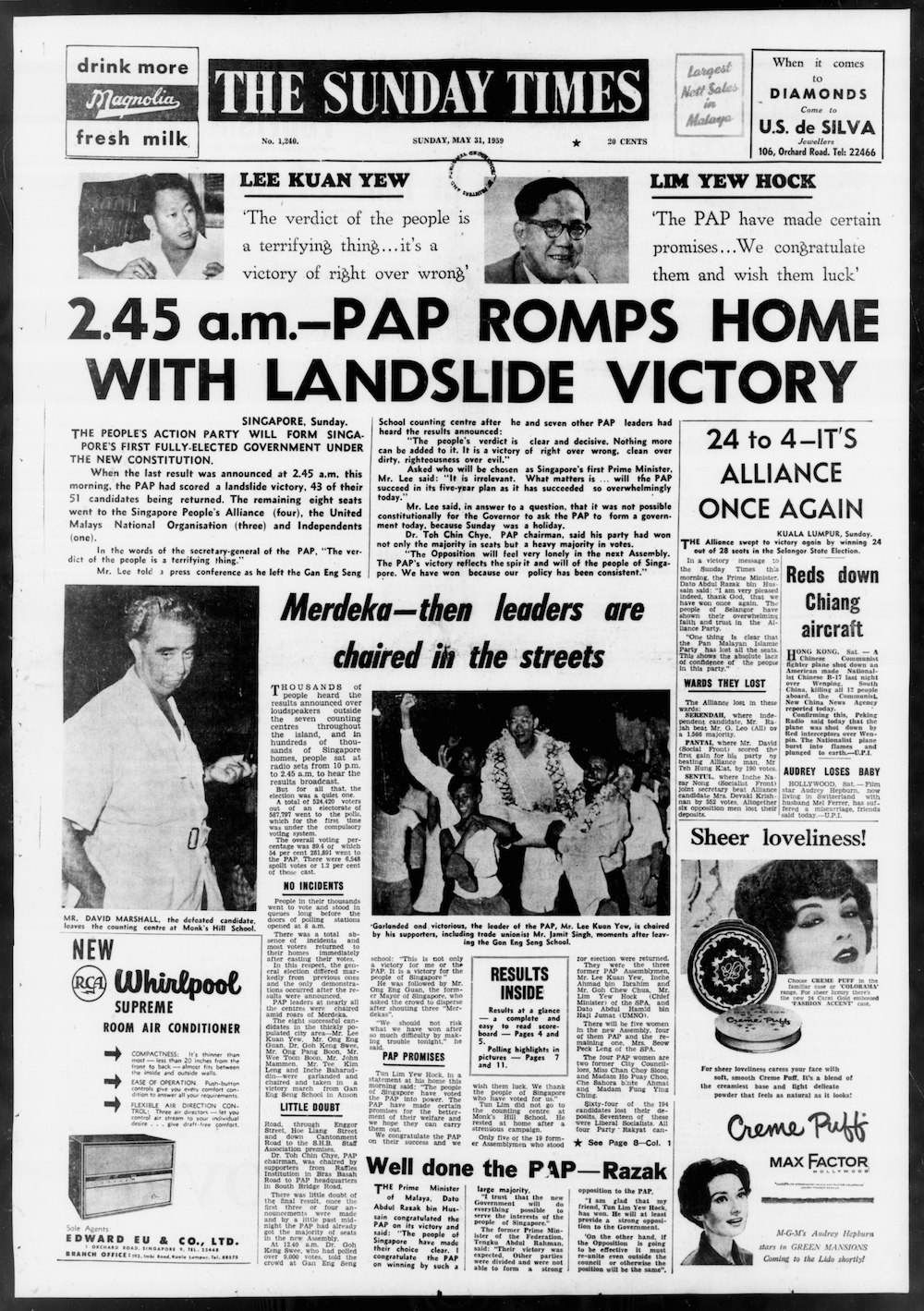
The Sunday Times the day after the 1959 election, reporting on the results and the PAP's victory

The PAP eventually won the 1959 general election. The election was also the first one to produce a fully elected parliament and a cabinet wielding powers of full internal self-government. The party has remained in power ever since, winning a majority of seats in every successive general election. Lee, who was chosen to be the first Prime Minister after an internal election within the PAP and would eventually helm this post for the next 31 years, requested the British for the release of the left-wing members of the PAP, including the likes of Lim Chin Siong, Fong Swee Suan, Sandrasegaran Woodhull, James Puthucheary and Devan Nair.

In 1961, the Singapore Trades Union Congress (STUC), which had backed the PAP back in 1959, split into the pro-PAP National Trades Union Congress (NTUC) and the non-affiliated and more leftist Singapore Association of Trade Unions (SATU). The SATU collapsed in 1963, following the now PAP-led government's crackdown and detention of its leaders during Operation Coldstore and its subsequent official deregistration on 13 November 1963. The NTUC remains as the sole trade union centre in the country today and continues to have a close relationship with the PAP.

==== Great Split of 1961 ====
In 1961, disagreements on the proposed merger plan to form Malaysia and long-standing internal party power struggle led to the split of the left-wing group from the PAP.

Although the "communist" faction had been frozen out of ever taking over the PAP, other problems had begun to arise internally. Ong Eng Guan, the former Mayor of the City Council after PAP's victory in the 1957 Singapore City Council election, presented a set of "16 Resolutions" to revisit some issues previously explored by Chin Siong's faction of the PAP: abolishing the PPSO, revising the Constitution, and changing the method of selecting cadre members.

Although Ong's 16 Resolutions originated from the left-wing faction led by Lim Chin Siong, that faction had only reluctantly asked the PAP leadership to clarify its position on them, as they still thought that the party with Lee Kuan Yew at the helm was a better alternative than Ong who was regarded as mercurial and a tyrant. However, Lee took the stance taken by the left-wing PAP members as a lack of confidence in his leadership. This issue caused a rift between the "moderate" PAP members (led by Lee) and the "left-wing" faction (led by Lim).

Ong was then expelled, and he resigned his Assembly seat to challenge the government to a by-election in Hong Lim in April 1961, where he won 73.3% of the vote. This was despite the fact that Lee Kuan Yew had made a secret alliance with Fong Chong Pik, the leader of the Communist Party of Malaya (CPM), to get the CPM cadres to support the PAP in the by-election.

==== Barisan Sosialis ====
The breakaway group of members formed the Barisan Sosialis with Lim Chin Siong as secretary-general. Aside from the Chinese union leaders, lawyers Thampoe Thamby Rajah and Tann Wee Tiong, several members from the University Socialist Club such as James Puthucheary (uncle of Janil Puthucheary) and Poh Soo Kai joined the party. 35 of 51 branches of the PAP and 19 of 23 branch secretaries defected to Barisan.

=== Merger years, 1963–1965 ===
After gaining independence from Britain, Singapore joined the federation of Malaysia in 1963. Although the PAP was the ruling party in the state of Singapore, the PAP functioned as an opposition party at the federal level in the larger Malaysian political landscape. At that time and until the 2018 general election, the federal government in Kuala Lumpur was controlled by a coalition led by the United Malays National Organisation (UMNO). However, the prospect that the PAP might rule Malaysia agitated UMNO. The PAP's decision to contest federal parliamentary seats outside Singapore and the UMNO decision to contest seats within Singapore breached an unspoken agreement to respect each other's spheres of influence and aggravated PAP–UMNO relations. The clash of personalities between PAP leader Lee Kuan Yew and Malaysian Prime Minister Tunku Abdul Rahman resulted in a crisis and led to Rahman forcing Singapore to leave Malaysia on 9 August 1965. Upon independence, the nascent People's Action Party of Malaya, which had been registered in Malaysia on 10 March 1964, had its registration cancelled on 9 September 1965, just a month after Singapore's exit. Those with the now non-existent party applied to register People's Action Party, Malaya which was again rejected by the Malaysian government, before settling with the Democratic Action Party (DAP).

=== Post-independence, 1965–present ===
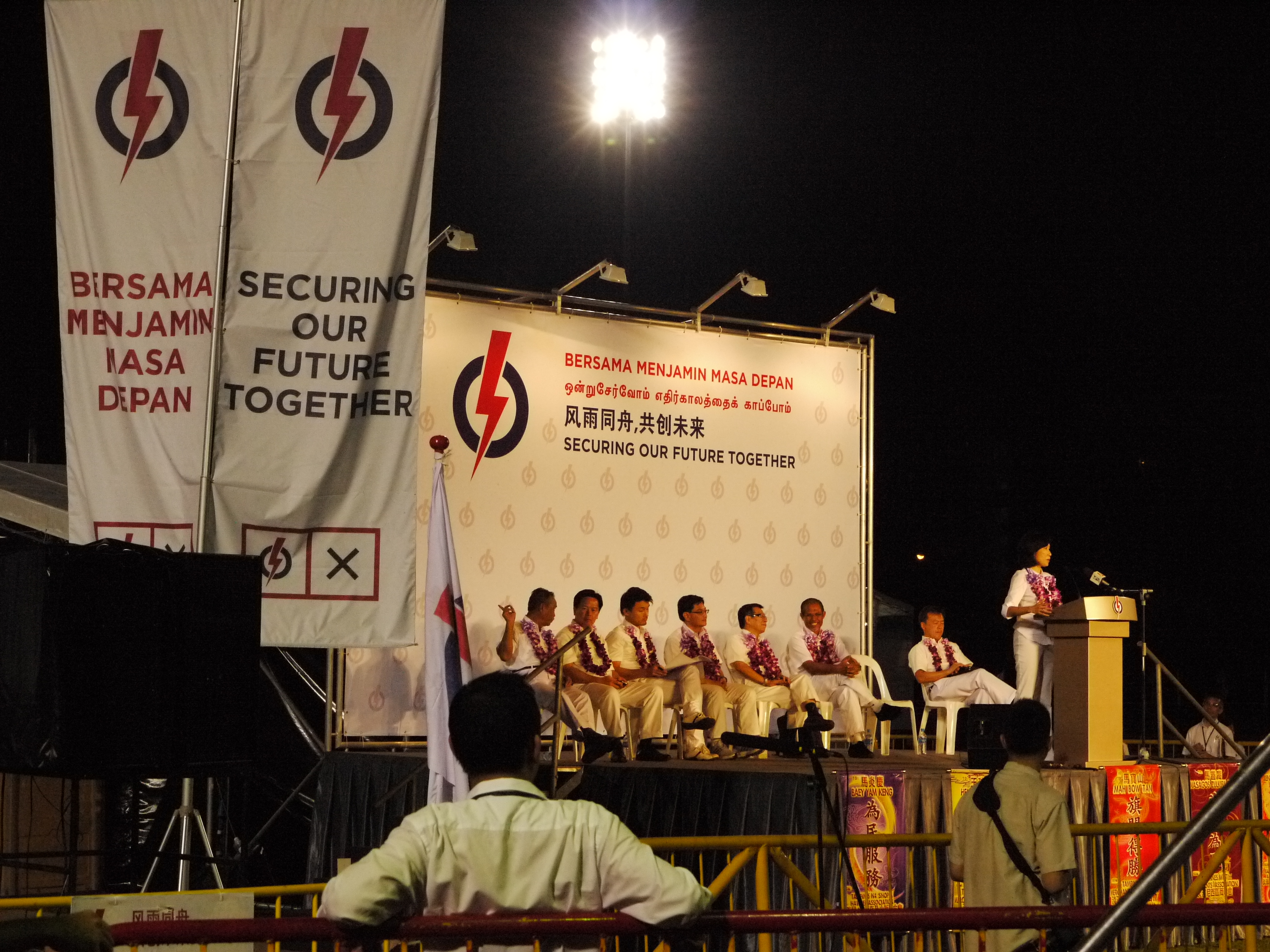
A PAP election rally at Tampines Stadium in 2011

The PAP has held an overwhelming majority of seats in the Parliament of Singapore since 1966, when the opposition Barisan Sosialis (Socialist Front) resigned from Parliament after winning 13 seats following the 1963 general election, which took place months after a number of their leaders had been arrested in Operation Coldstore based on accusations of being communists affiliated with the Communist Party of Malaya (CPM).

It subsequently achieved a monopoly in an expanding parliament (winning every parliamentary seat) for the next four elections (1968, 1972, 1976 and 1980). Opposition parties returned to the legislature at a 1981 by-election. The 1984 general election was the first election in 21 years in which opposition parties won seats. From then until 2006, the PAP faced four opposition MPs at most. Opposition parties did not win more than four parliamentary seats from 1984 until 2011 when the Workers' Party (WP) won six seats and took away a Group Representation Constituency (GRC) for the first time for any opposition party, as well as until 2020 by which an opposition party had won more than one GRC, which was also achieved by the WP.

Even so, the PAP still holds a supermajority in the legislature, to the point that Singapore is effectively a dominant party system similar to Japan's Liberal Democratic Party (LDP) rule of the country. With its supermajority, the PAP has always had the ability to amend the Constitution of Singapore at will, including the introduction of multi-member constituencies under the GRC system (in 1988) or the Nominated Member of Parliament (NMPs) scheme (in 1990), which has helped strengthened the government's dominance and control of Parliament.

== Leadership transitions ==
The longtime governing party of Singapore, spans both past and present, but notably occurred in the mid-1980s where the first generation of PAP leaders in the CEC and the Cabinet of Singapore ceded power to a second generation of leaders.

=== First to second generation ===
By 1984, the "old guard" (first generation of party leaders) had been governing Singapore for approximately a quarter of a century. Aging leadership was a key concern, and then-Prime Minister of Singapore Lee Kuan Yew sought to groom younger leaders. In a speech on 29 September 1984, Lee argued that though the first generation of leaders was still "alert and fully in charge", to hang on to power until they had become feeble would allow power to be wrested from them, with no say in who their successors were.

On 30 September, at the Ordinary Party Conference, power was transferred to the second generation of leaders, who were elected to the Central Executive Committee in place of all the old CEC members; of the 14-member CEC, Lee Kuan Yew remained the only "old guard" leader.

According to a report to the Library of Congress, the old guard were confident in their "rectitude" and discretion in using their extensive political powers for Singapore's common good, but were not as confident in the next generation in doing so. Various limits on executive power were considered, in order to minimise the chances of corruption. These included a popularly elected President of Singapore with substantial, nonceremonial powers. This particular reform was enacted with a constitutional amendment in 1991.

The old guard also sought to eschew the use of PAP as a central political institution, seeking to "depoliticise" and disperse power among society, and sought to include low-level community leaders in government. A policy of cross-fertilisation was enacted: exchange of leaders, "elites" and talent would take place between private and government sectors, civilian and military segments of society, and between the party and the National Trades Union Congress (NTUC).

=== Second to third generation ===
The next generation of leaders in the late 1980s was split between the factions of then Brigadier General Lee Hsien Loong and the older, more-experienced Goh Chok Tong. Lee Hsien Loong was supported by bureaucrats in the Ministry of Defence and army colleagues in the Singapore Armed Forces; Goh Chok Tong had more influence in the Singapore Civil Service, the Cabinet and government-linked companies.

Lee Kuan Yew himself remained Prime Minister and in the CEC until 1990, when he stepped down in favour of Goh Chok Tong as PM. Lee Hsien Loong became PM in 2004.

=== Third to fourth generation ===
On 23 November 2018, two fourth-generation leadership members (then–Minister for Finance Heng Swee Keat and then–Minister for Trade and Industry Chan Chun Sing) were elected as the First and Second Assistant Secretaries-General; these were, respectively, the second- and third-highest positions in the party. They replaced Teo Chee Hean and Tharman Shanmugaratnam. This represented a significant step of the leadership transition from the third generation to the fourth generation.

On 1 May 2019, Heng Swee Keat was appointed the new and sole Deputy Prime Minister, replacing Teo and Tharman. He was then widely seen as the 4th and next Prime Minister and Secretary-General of PAP succeeding incumbent Lee Hsien Loong. However, on 8 April 2021, Heng unexpectedly announced he would step down as the fourth-generation leader and step aside to pave the way for younger and healthier leaders to take over leadership, citing his health and age as reasons. Several Cabinet members were then seen as possible candidates to succeed Heng, including Minister for Finance Lawrence Wong, Minister for Health Ong Ye Kung, and Minister for Education Chan Chun Sing.

On 14 April 2022, Wong was selected as new leader of PAP's fourth-generation (4G) team, succeeding Heng. Wong received an "overwhelming majority" of support in the consultation process, surpassing that of other nominees. His candidacy was unanimously endorsed by the cabinet and subsequently by the PAP MPs at a party caucus on 14 April. On 4 December 2024, he was elected Secretary-General of People's Action Party, with an endorsement from Lee Hsien Loong.

== Organisation ==
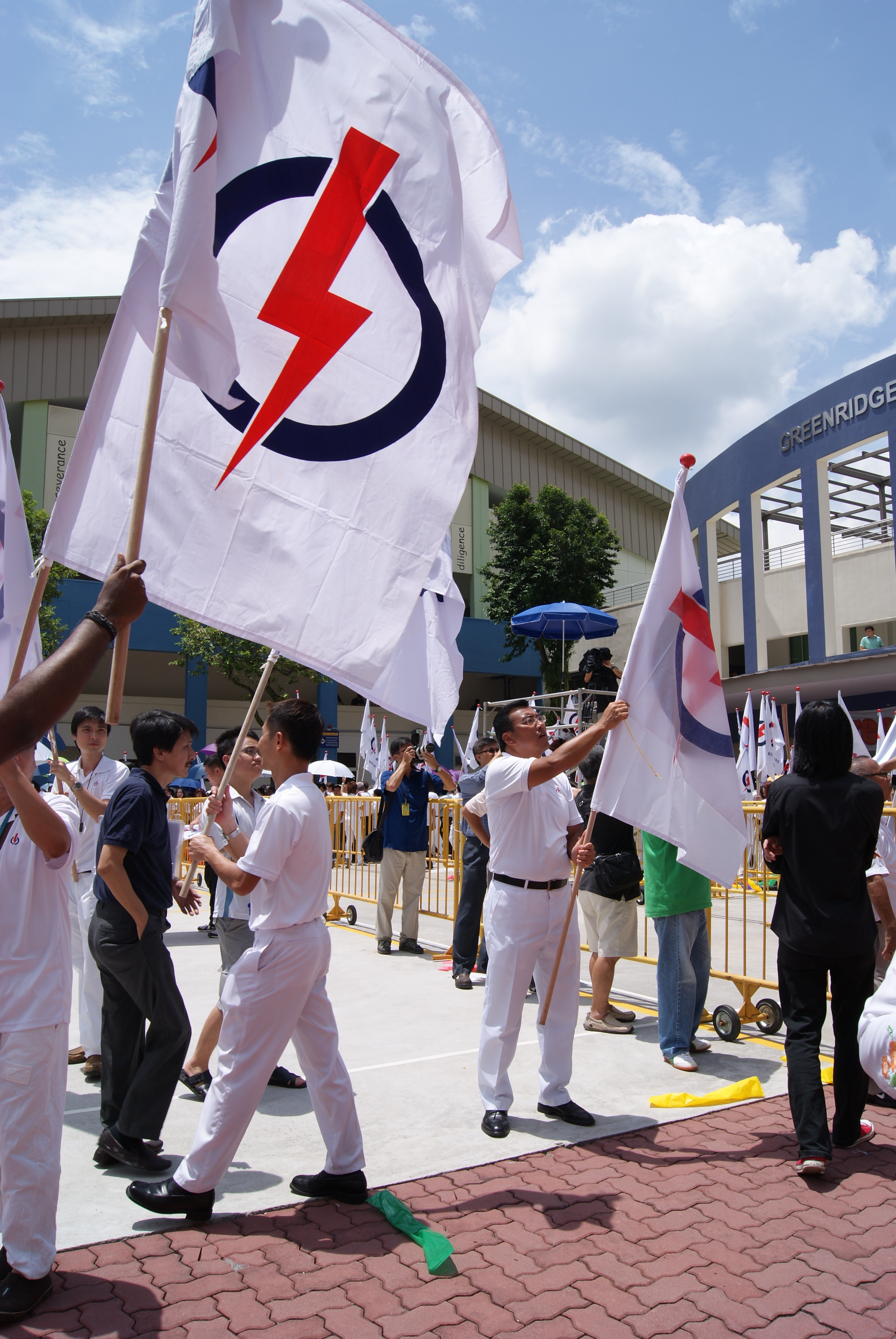
People's Action Party activists during the 2011 general election

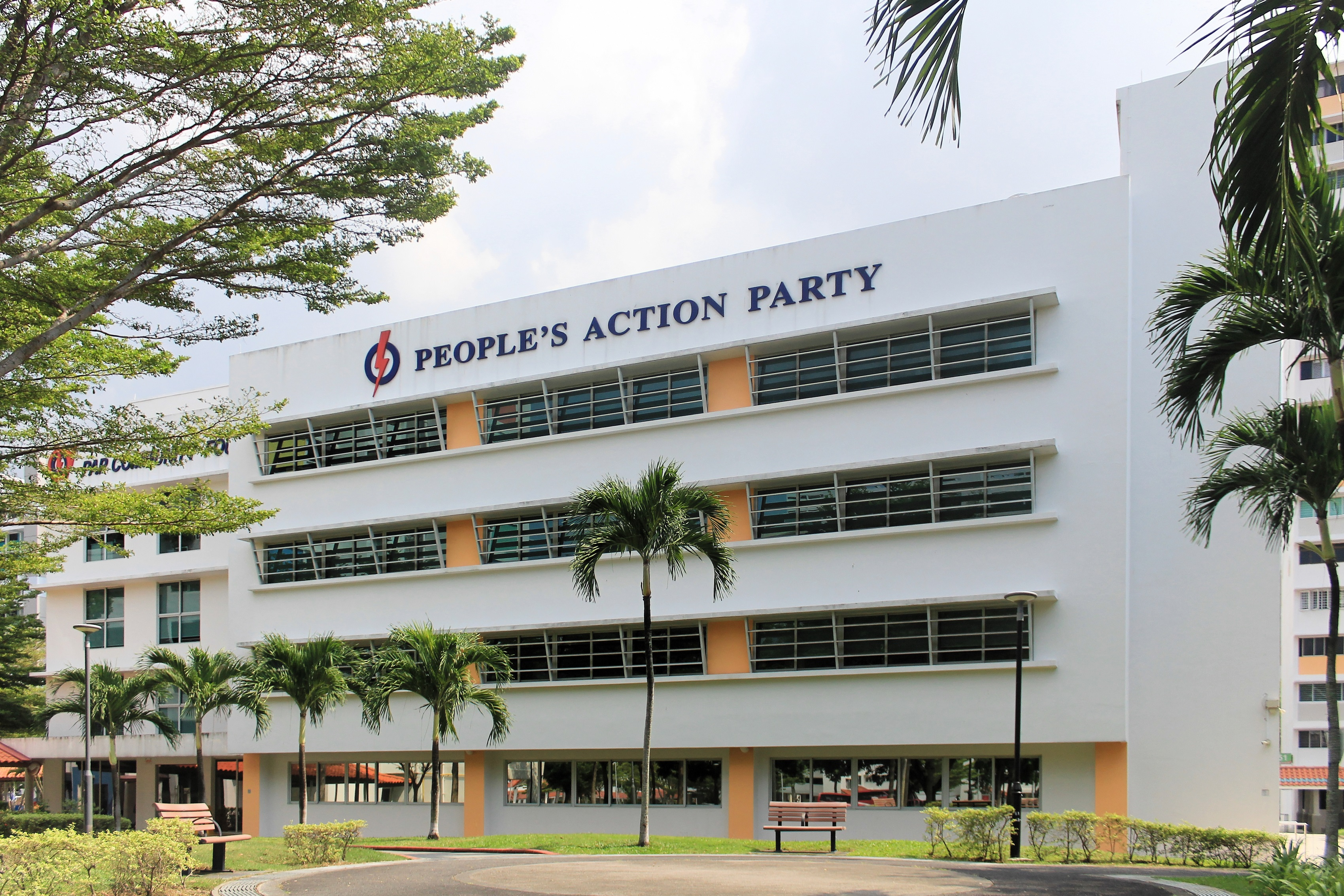
People's Action Party headquarters in New Upper Changi Road

During its initial years, the party had adopted a traditional Leninist form of party organisation, together with a vanguard cadre from its labour-leaning faction. The PAP Executive later expelled the leftist faction in 1961, bringing the ideological basis of the party into the centre and later in the 1960s moving further to the right. Since independence, there have been no publicly known factions within the PAP. While MPs debate policies internally or voice some disagreement in Parliament, everyone must vote along the party line once a decision is made. However, political developments since the late 2010s have challenged the party's cohesion. These include the 2019 defection of former PAP MP and cadre Tan Cheng Bock to form the Progress Singapore Party (PSP), alongside Lee Hsien Loong's high-profile family rivalry over 38 Oxley Road that first erupted publicly in 2017, which involved his brother Lee Hsien Yang. Observers also believe that internal factions do exist but are strictly kept out of the public eye to avoid political instability.

In the beginning, there were about 500 so-called temporary cadres appointed, however the current number of cadres is unknown, with the register of cadres being kept confidential. In 1988, Wong Kan Seng revealed that there were more than 1,000 cadres. Cadre members have the right to attend party conferences and to vote for and elect and to be elected into the Central Executive Committee (CEC), the pinnacle of party leaders.

To become a party cadre, a party member must be first nominated by the MP in their branch. The candidate will then undergo three sessions of interview, each with four to five ministers or MPs and the appointment is then made by the CEC. About 100 candidates are nominated each year. Alternatively, party cadres are recruited based on recommendations by existing PAP cadres, prospective recruits for general election candidates are then internally shortlisted before.

=== Central Executive Committee and Secretary-General ===
Political power in the party is concentrated in the CEC, led by the secretary-general. The secretary-general of the PAP is the leader of the party. Due to PAP's electoral victories in every general election since 1959, the prime minister of Singapore has been by convention the secretary-general of the PAP since 1959. Key appointments in the CEC are usually Cabinet members.

From 1957 onward, the rules laid down that the outgoing CEC should recommend a list of candidates from which the cadre members can then vote for the next CEC. This has recently changed so that the CEC nominates eight members and the party caucus selects the remaining ten.

Historically, the position of Secretary-General was not considered for the office of Prime Minister, but rather the Central Executive Committee held an election to choose the prime minister. There was a contest between PAP Secretary-General Lee Kuan Yew and PAP Treasurer Ong Eng Guan, prior to 1959. Lee subsequently won the leadership and was inaugurated as the first prime minister of Singapore.

=== HQ Executive Committee ===
The next lower level committee is the HQ Executive Committee (HQ EXCO) which performs the party's administration and oversees 14 sub-committees.

The sub-committees are the following:

1. Branch Appointments and Relations
2. Constituency Relations
3. Information and Feedback
4. New Media
5. Malay Affairs
6. Membership Recruitment and Cadre Selection
7. PAP Awards
8. Political Education
9. Publicity and Publication
10. Social and Recreational
11. Women's Wing (WW)
12. Young PAP (YP)
13. PAP Seniors Group (PAP.SG)
14. PAP Policy Forum (PPF)

=== Young PAP and internet presence ===
The Young PAP is the youth-wing of the party, serving as a youth organisation for young adults and students in Singapore who support the PAP and have an interest in politics. The incumbent chairman of the youth-wing is Janil Puthucheary. The YP's predecessor, the PAP Youth Committee, was established in 1986, under Lee Hsien Loong's tenure as chairman. All PAP members under the age of 35 had then been grouped under the Youth Committee. In 1993, the Youth Committee was renamed the Young PAP. In an effort to attract members, then Chairman George Yeo said that people joining the YP could take positions different from central party leadership. The age limit was raised from 35 to 40. Memberships are issued through the PAP branches under each constituency in Singapore. By 2005, the committee had grown to more than 6,000 members. In 2010, then Vice-chairman Zaqy Mohamad said the YP attracts over 1200 new members that year, an increase on the 1000 new members in 2009.

Since 1995, the youth-wing of the PAP has had an internet presence that aims to "correct 'misinformation' about Singapore politics or culture". Under the urging of then Minister for Information and the Arts George Yeo, Young PAP took charge of running several online websites to create an online presence for the party. After popular forum Sintercom was shut down in 2001, the Young PAP offered their own forum for moderated discussions. They have since set up various blogs and social media accounts with multimedia content to engage the masses.

In February 2007, it was reported by The Straits Times that the PAP's new media committee chaired by Minister Ng Eng Hen, had initiated an effort to counter critics anonymously on the Internet "as it was necessary for the PAP to have a voice on cyberspace". The initiative was divided by two sub-committees, one of which was in charge of strategising the campaigns and is co-headed by Minister Lui Tuck Yew and MP Zaqy Mohamad. The other sub-committee—new media capabilities group led by MPs Baey Yam Keng and Josephine Teo executed the strategies. The initiative was set up after the 2006 general election and also included around 20 IT-savvy PAP activists.

=== Friends of the PAP ===
The PAP has a long-running programme, known as 'Friends of the PAP' by which it enlists individuals and organisations to assist in promoting its political goals. In 2002, secretary-general Goh Chok Tong announced an intention to expand this programme, which at the time was primarily limited to "establishment figures" in the public and private sector. He established a related scheme titled "Young Friends of the PAP" to attract Singaporeans below the age of 40 as well and explained that the intention was to "refresh" the PAP and improve the "quality" of PAP's membership. Membership as a 'Young Friend' was by invitation only, and the group was limited to about 500 people.

According to local media reports, the Friends of the PAP programme had "fallen out of the public consciousness" after 2002. However, in June 2024, the PAP revived the Friends of the PAP programme and expanded it, now with a renewed focus on local social media influencers, with the intention to connect with a wider and younger audience. The PAP did not respond to media queries about whether the Friends of the PAP programme remained invite-only or what the rules of engagement for members of the programme were.

== Recruitment and retention ==
Unlike many political parties in numerous other countries that rely on grassroots mobilisation and overt rewards for party loyalty, the PAP adopts a highly centralised, top-down and meritocratic approach to candidate recruitment; this is officially to prevent nepotism, cronyism, branch stacking, entryism or any form of primary elections. Rather than progressing through local branches or factional networks, prospective legislators are identified through "talent spotting" (executive search) by senior figures in government and industry. This screening mechanism is designed to attract individuals with distinguished records in the civil service, the armed forces, academia, managerial executives from the private sector or non-profit sector, or professional sectors such as engineering, law, finance, mass media and health care. Murali Pillai, a PAP MP, has claimed that the party's "unique preselection invitation system" is meant to "maintain its technocratic, meritocratic, realpolitik and pragmatic character", and to "prevent personalist dictatorships, populism and political polarisation".

Prospective candidates first emerge through recommendations by PAP activists, corporate leaders, MPs and senior civil servants. Each year, roughly one hundred individuals are invited to "tea sessions", a euphemism for informal party interviews seeking candidates in upcoming general elections, with 2 to 3 serving ministers, during which they engage in in-depth discussions lasting up to two and a half hours. Sometimes, the true intent of the interview(s) is initially unbeknownst to attendees. Those shortlisted then face two formal interviews conducted by a high-level panel at party headquarters; successful interviewees meet again with ministers, though final approval rests with the Central Executive Committee (CEC) before the successful interviewees are "invited to join politics".

Furthermore, a small number of recruits, typically five or six per electoral cycle, are selected for additional psychological assessment. These candidates undergo a day-and-a-half examination of more than 1,000 questions to evaluate their personality and disposition, and are then earmarked as potential ministerial talent. While the PAP presents this elaborate, multi-stage process as a means of upholding "meritocracy" by choosing the "best man or woman for the job", critics argue that the heavy reliance on elite networks and professional pedigrees renders the system fundamentally elitist and prone to groupthink rather than genuinely open to wider society, especially the working class who may share a different socioeconomic environment and resulting worldview.

Although only a fraction of prospective short-listed candidates are selected to represent the PAP at general elections, not everyone invited to the candidate pipeline accepts the offer. Many decline for personal or professional reasons; some encounter employer restrictions, others face familial opposition or believe that they are unsuited for politics. Likewise, when it comes to retaining serving PAP MPs in Singapore, despite the elevated salaries for ministers and MPs in Singapore, a small number also choose not to seek re-election or step aside before any given election, citing similar personal, family, lifestyle or career considerations.

== Ideology ==
=== Asian democracy ===
Professor Hussin Mutalib from the National University of Singapore (NUS) opines that the PAP has often set forth the idea of Asian democracy and values, drawing from a notion of Asian culture and Confucianism to construct ideological bulwarks against Western democracy. He added that for founding prime minister Lee Kuan Yew, "Singapore would be better off without Western-style liberal democracy".

Consequently, the governance of the PAP has occasionally been characterised by some observers, especially in the West, as semi-authoritarian by liberal democratic standards or having turned Singapore into a nanny state. According to Professor Kenneth Paul Tan from the NUS, the PAP proclaim that many Singaporeans continue to vote for the party as economic considerations, pragmatism and stability triumph over accountability and checks and balances by opposition parties.

=== Economic policies ===
The party economic ideology has always accepted the need for some welfare spending and for pragmatic economic interventionism. However, free-market policies have been popular since the 1980s as part of the wider implementation of a meritocracy in civil society, and Singapore frequently ranks extremely highly on indices of economic freedom published by economically liberal organisations such as the World Bank and the International Monetary Fund. Singapore is also the only Asian country with the top AAA sovereign rating from the "Big Three" credit rating agencies of S&P, Moody's and Fitch.

Lee Kuan Yew said in 1992: "Through Hong Kong watching, I concluded that state welfare and subsidies blunted the individual's drive to succeed. I watched with amazement the ease with which Hong Kong workers adjusted their salaries upwards in boom times and downwards in recessions. I resolved to reverse course on the welfare policies which my party had inherited or copied from British Labour Party policies".

Notably, since Singapore's independence in 1965, the party has also supported the creation of state-owned enterprises, known within Singapore as Government-linked Corporations (GLCs), in order to jumpstart industrialisation, spearhead economic development and lead to economic growth (primarily job creation) in various sectors of the Singaporean economy as there was a lack of private sector funds and expertise, particularly in the early years of nationhood. Various GLCs were formed to pursue strategic sectors such as in ship building and repair (Sembcorp Marine, Keppel Corporation), aviation and defence (Singapore Airlines, ST Engineering), telecommunications (Singtel), real estate (CapitaLand) and development finance (DBS Bank) amongst others. In addition, various GLCs were set up as private-public partnerships, notable as joint ventures or strategic alliances with foreign companies or investors with relevant expertise, particularly in the petrochemicals and oil refining industries.

=== Social policies ===
Since the early years of the PAP's rule, the idea of survival as a small and vulnerable country with hostile neighbours has been a central theme of Singaporean politics. According to Diane Mauzy and R. S. Milne, most analysts of Singapore have discerned four major ideologies of the PAP, namely pragmatism, meritocracy, multiracialism and Asian values/communitarianism. The PAP also advocates nationalism not based on ethnocentrism, encouraging a united Singaporean identity while also recognising the main ethnic groups that make up the country.

In January 1989, then President Wee Kim Wee in his opening address to the 7th Parliament of Singapore stated that Singapore must adopt a set of shared national values. He was of the view that a national ideology was useful to bond Singaporeans together by preserving the cultural heritage of the core communities of Singapore, and upholding certain common values that would capture the essence of being a Singaporean. In response, the government set up a committee as a follow-up to Wee's proposal, and in January 1991, the PAP formally introduced a white paper on "Shared Values" for the country, which consists of five national values to forge a national identity. These values were: nation before community and society above self; family as the basic unit of society; regard and community support for the individual; consensus instead of contention, and racial and religious harmony. They were also set as a contrast against the "more Westernised, individualistic, and self-centred outlook on life" and to uphold the "traditional Asian ideas of morality, duty and society".

At an Institute of Policy Studies (IPS) dialogue held on 2 July 2015 and chaired by Fareed Zakaria, Prime Minister Lee Hsien Loong spoke about the need to maintain a Jeffersonian natural aristocracy in the system to instill a culture of respect and to avoid anarchy. In November 2019, Lee stated at a party convention that the PAP must not allow the "disconnect between the masses and the elite seen in other countries to take root in Singapore". During the election campaign in July 2020, Lee's estranged brother over 38 Oxley Road, Lee Hsien Yang, accused the PAP of elitism as one of his explanations of joining the Progress Singapore Party (PSP). In a 2024 interview, Lee Hsien Loong criticised "wokeness", claiming that it "causes life to be burdensome" and saying that "he did not want Singapore to go in that direction".

=== Views on other ideologies ===
Particularly during the climate of the Cold War, the party was openly hostile to communist or left-wing political ideologies despite a brief joint alliance with the pro-labour co-founders of the PAP during the party's early years, who were eventually accused of being communists and arrested. Nevertheless, Singapore formally joined the Non-Aligned Movement (NAM) in 1970 and did not openly align with the Capitalist Bloc. In 1987, as part of Operation Spectrum, the PAP government arrested various individuals under accusations of plotting to overthrow the government and to establish a communist state. Since the 2010s, the party while remaining largely conservative was seen by some observers as to have adopted a more centre-left tack in certain areas in order to remain electorally dominant.

In 1976, the PAP formally resigned from the Socialist International (SI) after the Dutch Labour Party had initially proposed to expel the PAP for the Singapore government's internment of political prisoners without trial, and accused it of human rights violations.

=== Symbolism ===
The PAP symbol, which is a red flash and blue circle on white, stands for action inside multicultural unity. It also appears on party flags on parades. PAP members at party rallies have customarily worn a uniform of white shirts and white trousers which symbolises incorruptibility and purity of the party's ideologies of the government. Lee Kuan Yew acknowledged that the flash and circle was inspired by the British Union of Fascists (BUF), but that the colors were changed to better represent the PAP.

== Leadership ==
=== List of chairmen ===
Name	Term of office		Time in office
Toh Chin Chye	21 November 1954	5 January 1981	26 years, 45 days
Ong Teng Cheong	5 January 1981	16 August 1993	12 years, 223 days
Tony Tan	1 September 1993	3 December 2004	11 years, 93 days
Lim Boon Heng	3 December 2004	1 June 2011	6 years, 180 days
Khaw Boon Wan	1 June 2011	23 November 2018	7 years, 175 days
Gan Kim Yong	23 November 2018	26 November 2022	4 years, 3 days
Heng Swee Keat	26 November 2022	29 May 2025	2 years, 184 days
Desmond Lee	29 May 2025	Incumbent	1 year, 173 days

=== List of secretaries-general ===
Name	Term of office		Time in office	Refs
Lee Kuan Yew	21 November 1954	3 August 1957	2 years, 255 days	
T. T. Rajah	13 August 1957	3 September 1957	21 days	
Lee Kuan Yew	20 October 1957	14 November 1992	35 years, 25 days	
Goh Chok Tong	15 November 1992	6 November 2004	11 years, 357 days	
Lee Hsien Loong	7 November 2004	4 December 2024	20 years, 27 days	
Lawrence Wong	4 December 2024	Incumbent	1 year, 349 days	

=== Central Executive Committee ===
As of 05 November 2026, the Central Executive Committee comprises the following members:
Title	Name
Chairperson	Desmond Lee
Vice-chairperson	Masagos Zulkifli
Secretary-General	Lawrence Wong
Assistant Secretary-General	Chan Chun Sing
Treasurer	Ong Ye Kung
Assistant Treasurer	Chee Hong Tat
Organising Secretaries	Grace Fu
Organising Secretaries	Edwin Tong
Assistant Organising Secretaries	Alex Yam
Assistant Organising Secretaries	Desmond Tan
Assistant Organising Secretaries	Dinesh Vasu Dash
Members	K. Shanmugam
Members	Indranee Rajah
Members	Chan Hui Yuh
Members	Ng Chee Meng
Members	Tan See Leng
Members	Vivian Balakrishnan
Members	Sim Ann
Members	Lee Hsien Loong
Members	Zaqy Mohamad
Members	Jeffrey Siow

== Current Members of Parliament ==
Name	Constituency
Liang Eng Hwa	Bukit Panjang SMC
Low Yen Ling	Bukit Gombak SMC
Henry Kwek	Kebun Baru SMC
Gan Siow Huang	Marymount SMC
Gho Sze Kee	Mountbatten SMC
Ng Chee Meng	Jalan Kayu SMC
Xie Yao Quan	Jurong Central SMC
Eric Chua	Queenstown SMC
Patrick Tay	Pioneer SMC
Alex Yeo	Potong Pasir SMC
Melvin Yong	Radin Mas SMC
Poh Li San	Sembawang West SMC
Desmond Choo	Tampines Changkat SMC
Yip Hon Weng	Yio Chu Kang SMC
Cai Yinzhou	Bishan–Toa Payoh GRC
Chee Hong Tat	Bishan–Toa Payoh GRC
Elysa Chen	Bishan–Toa Payoh GRC
Saktiandi Supaat	Bishan–Toa Payoh GRC
Tan See Leng	Chua Chu Kang GRC
Choo Pei Ling	Chua Chu Kang GRC
Jeffrey Siow	Chua Chu Kang GRC
Zhulkarnain Abdul Rahim	Chua Chu Kang GRC
Vivian Balakrishnan	Holland–Bukit Timah GRC
Sim Ann	Holland–Bukit Timah GRC
Christopher de Souza	Holland–Bukit Timah GRC
Edward Chia	Holland–Bukit Timah GRC
Josephine Teo	Jalan Besar GRC
Shawn Loh	Jalan Besar GRC
Denise Phua	Jalan Besar GRC
Wan Rizal	Jalan Besar GRC
Lawrence Wong	Marsiling–Yew Tee GRC
Alex Yam	Marsiling–Yew Tee GRC
Zaqy Mohamad	Marsiling–Yew Tee GRC
Hany Soh	Marsiling–Yew Tee GRC
Lee Hsien Loong	Ang Mo Kio GRC
Darryl David	Ang Mo Kio GRC
Nadia Ahmad Samdin	Ang Mo Kio GRC
Jasmin Lau	Ang Mo Kio GRC
Victor Lye	Ang Mo Kio GRC
Dinesh Vasu Dash	East Coast GRC
Hazlina Abdul Halim	East Coast GRC
Tan Kiat How	East Coast GRC
Edwin Tong	East Coast GRC
Jessica Tan	East Coast GRC
Grace Fu	Jurong East-Bukit Batok GRC
Rahayu Mahzam	Jurong East-Bukit Batok GRC
Murali Pillai	Jurong East-Bukit Batok GRC
Lee Hong Chuang	Jurong East-Bukit Batok GRC
David Hoe	Jurong East-Bukit Batok GRC
Goh Pei Ming	Marine Parade-Braddell Heights GRC
Seah Kian Peng	Marine Parade-Braddell Heights GRC
Tin Pei Ling	Marine Parade-Braddell Heights GRC
Diana Pang	Marine Parade-Braddell Heights GRC
K. Shanmugam	Nee Soon GRC
Jackson Lam	Nee Soon GRC
Lee Hui Ying	Nee Soon GRC
Goh Hanyan	Nee Soon GRC
Syed Harun Alhabsyi	Nee Soon GRC
Indranee Rajah	Pasir Ris–Changi GRC
Valerie Lee	Pasir Ris–Changi GRC
Sharael Taha	Pasir Ris–Changi GRC
Desmond Tan	Pasir Ris–Changi GRC
Gan Kim Yong	Punggol GRC
Janil Puthucheary	Punggol GRC
Sun Xueling	Punggol GRC
Yeo Wan Ling	Punggol GRC
Ong Ye Kung	Sembawang GRC
Vikram Nair	Sembawang GRC
Ng Shi Xuan	Sembawang GRC
Gabriel Lam	Sembawang GRC
Mariam Jaafar	Sembawang GRC
Masagos Zulkifli	Tampines GRC
Baey Yam Keng	Tampines GRC
Charlene Chen	Tampines GRC
Koh Poh Koon	Tampines GRC
David Neo	Tampines GRC
Chan Chun Sing	Tanjong Pagar GRC
Foo Cexiang	Tanjong Pagar GRC
Joan Pereira	Tanjong Pagar GRC
Rachel Ong	Tanjong Pagar GRC
Alvin Tan	Tanjong Pagar GRC
Desmond Lee	West Coast-Jurong West GRC
Hamid Razak	West Coast-Jurong West GRC
Ang Wei Neng	West Coast-Jurong West GRC
Cassandra Lee	West Coast-Jurong West GRC
Shawn Huang	West Coast-Jurong West GRC

== Election results ==
=== Legislative Assembly ===
Election	Leader	Votes	%	Seats					Position	Result
Election	Leader	Votes	%	Contested			Total	+/–	Position	Result
Election	Leader	Votes	%	Seats	Won	Lost	Total	+/–	Position	Result
1955	Lee Kuan Yew	13,634	8.7%	4	3	1	3 / 25	▲3	▲3rd	Opposition
1959	Lee Kuan Yew	281,891	54.1%	51	43	8	43 / 51	▲40	▲1st	Supermajority
1963	Lee Kuan Yew	272,924	46.9%	51	37	14	37 / 51	▼6	1st	Supermajority

=== Dewan Rakyat ===
Election	Leader	Votes	%	Seats						+/–	Result
Election	Leader	Votes	%	Contested			Elected	Appointed	Total	+/–	Result
Election	Leader	Votes	%	Seats	Won	Lost	Elected	Appointed	Total	+/–	Result
1964	Lee Kuan Yew	42,130	2.0%	11	1	10	1 / 104	12 / 55	13 / 159	▲1	Opposition

=== Parliament ===
Election	Leader	Votes	%	Seats						Position	Result
Election	Leader	Votes	%	Contested			Walkover	Total	+/–	Position	Result
Election	Leader	Votes	%	Seats	Won	Lost	Walkover	Total	+/–	Position	Result
1968	Lee Kuan Yew	65,812	86.7%	58	7	0	51	58 / 58	▲21	▲1st	Won all seats
1972	Lee Kuan Yew	524,892	70.4%	65	57	0	8	65 / 65	▲7	1st	Won all seats
1976	Lee Kuan Yew	590,169	74.1%	69	53	0	16	69 / 69	▲4	1st	Won all seats
1980	Lee Kuan Yew	494,268	77.7%	75	38	0	37	75 / 75	▲6	1st	Won all seats
1984	Lee Kuan Yew	568,310	64.8%	79	47	2	30	77 / 79	▲2	1st	Supermajority
1988	Lee Kuan Yew	848,029	63.2%	81	69	1	11	80 / 81	▲3	1st	Supermajority
1991	Goh Chok Tong	477,760	61.0%	81	36	4	41	77 / 81	▼3	1st	Supermajority
1997	Goh Chok Tong	465,751	65.0%	83	34	2	47	81 / 83	▲4	1st	Supermajority
2001	Goh Chok Tong	470,765	75.3%	84	27	2	55	82 / 84	▲1	1st	Supermajority
2006	Lee Hsien Loong	748,130	66.6%	84	45	2	37	82 / 84	Steady	1st	Supermajority
2011	Lee Hsien Loong	1,212,514	60.1%	87	76	6	5	81 / 87	▼1	1st	Supermajority
2015	Lee Hsien Loong	1,579,183	69.9%	89	83	6	0	83 / 89	▲2	1st	Supermajority
2020	Lee Hsien Loong	1,527,491	61.2%	93	83	10	0	83 / 93	Steady	1st	Supermajority
2025	Lawrence Wong	1,564,770	65.6%	97	87	10	5	87 / 97	▲4	1st	Supermajority

=== By-elections ===
Legislative Assembly

Election	Leader	Constituency contested	Votes	%	Seats	+/–	Result
1957	Lee Kuan Yew	Tanjong Pagar	4,707	37.0%	1 / 2	Steady	Won
1961	Lee Kuan Yew	Anson; Hong Lim	5,872	31.1%	0 / 2	▼2	Lost
1965	Lee Kuan Yew	Hong Lim	6,398	59.5%	1 / 1	▲1	Won

Parliament

Election	Leader	Constituency contested	Votes	%	Seats					Result
Election	Leader	Constituency contested	Votes	%	Contested		Walkover	Total	+/–	Result
Election	Leader	Constituency contested	Votes	%	Won	Lost	Walkover	Total	+/–	Result
1966	Lee Kuan Yew	Bukit Merah SMC; Bukit Timah SMC; Chua Chu Kang SMC; Crawford SMC; Joo Chiat SMC; Jurong SMC; Paya Lebar SMC	9,082	82.9%	1	0	6	7 / 7	▲7	Won
1967	Lee Kuan Yew	Bukit Panjang SMC; Havelock SMC; Jalan Kayu SMC; Tampines SMC; Thomson SMC	9,407	83.6%	1	0	4	5 / 5	▲5	Won
1970	Lee Kuan Yew	Delta SMC; Havelock SMC; Kampong Kapor SMC; Ulu Pandan SMC; Whampoa SMC	14,545	69.9%	2	0	3	5 / 5	Steady	Won
1979	Lee Kuan Yew	Anson SMC; Geylang West SMC; Mountbatten SMC; Nee Soon SMC; Potong Pasir SMC; Sembawang SMC; Telok Blangah SMC	53,222	72.7%	5	0	2	7 / 7	Steady	Won
1981	Lee Kuan Yew	Anson SMC	6,359	47.1%	0	1	0	0 / 1	▼1	Lost
1992	Goh Chok Tong	Marine Parade GRC	48,965	72.9%	4	0	0	4 / 4	Steady	Won
2012	Lee Hsien Loong	Hougang SMC	8,223	37.9%	0	1	0	0 / 1	Steady	Lost
2013	Lee Hsien Loong	Punggol East SMC	12,856	43.7%	0	1	0	0 / 1	▼1	Lost
2016	Lee Hsien Loong	Bukit Batok SMC	14,428	61.2%	1	0	0	1 / 1	Steady	Won

== See also ==
- PAP Community Foundation
- Party Whip of the People's Action Party
- Politics of Singapore
- List of political parties in Singapore
