= S. Rajaratnam =

Singaporean politician (1915–2006)

S. Rajaratnam DUT
- எஸ். ராஜரத்தினம்
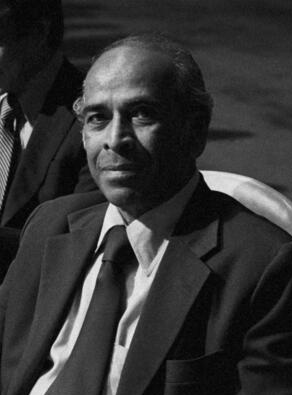
- Rajaratnam in 1975

1st Senior Minister of Singapore
- In office 2 January 1985 – 3 September 1988
- Prime Minister: Lee Kuan Yew
- Preceded by: Office established
- Succeeded by: Lee Kuan Yew (1990)

2nd Deputy Prime Minister of Singapore
- In office 1 June 1980 – 1 January 1985 Serving with Goh Keng Swee (1973–1980)
- Prime Minister: Lee Kuan Yew
- Preceded by: Toh Chin Chye (1968)
- Succeeded by: Goh Chok Tong; Ong Teng Cheong

Minister for Labour
- In office 16 April 1968 – 4 July 1971
- Prime Minister: Lee Kuan Yew
- Preceded by: Jek Yeun Thong
- Succeeded by: Ong Pang Boon

Minister for Foreign Affairs
- In office 9 August 1965 – 1 June 1980
- Prime Minister: Lee Kuan Yew
- Preceded by: Office established
- Succeeded by: S. Dhanabalan

Minister for Culture
- In office 5 June 1959 – 12 August 1965
- Prime Minister: Lee Kuan Yew
- Preceded by: Office established
- Succeeded by: Othman Wok

Member of the Malaysian Parliament for Singapore
- In office 2 November 1963 – 9 August 1965
- Preceded by: Position established
- Succeeded by: Position abolished

Member of the Singapore Parliament for Kampong Glam Constituency (Note: Formerly the Legislative Assembly from 1959 to 1965.)
- In office 30 May 1959 – 17 August 1988
- Preceded by: Constituency established
- Succeeded by: Loh Meng See (PAP)

Personal details
- Born: Sinnathamby Rajaratnam; 25 February 1915 Vaddukoddai, Jaffna District, British Ceylon
- Died: 22 February 2006 (aged 90) Singapore
- Cause of death: Heart failure
- Citizenship: Singaporean
- Party: People's Action Party
- Spouse: Piroska Feher (m. 1943; died 1989)
- Education: King's College London
- Occupation: Politician; journalist

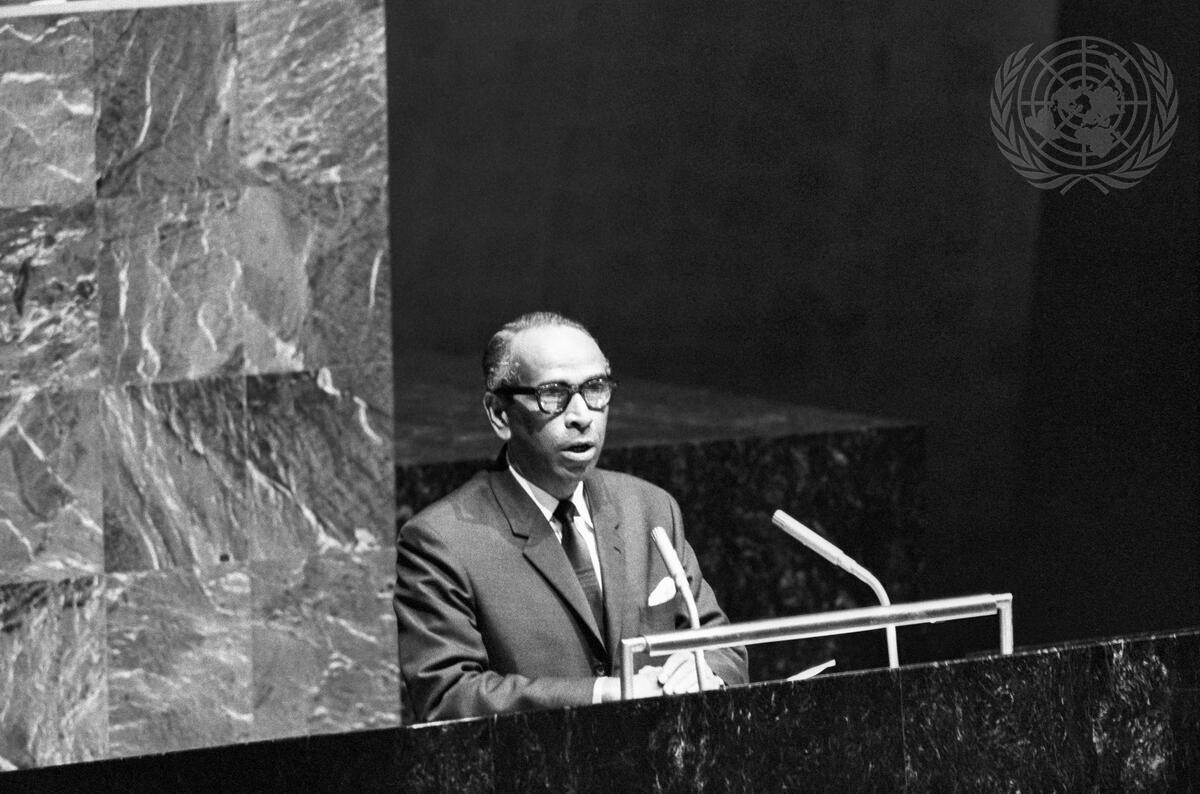
In September 1965, S. Rajaratnam, Singapore's first Minister for Foreign Affairs, speaks to the UN General Assembly after the nation's formal admission.

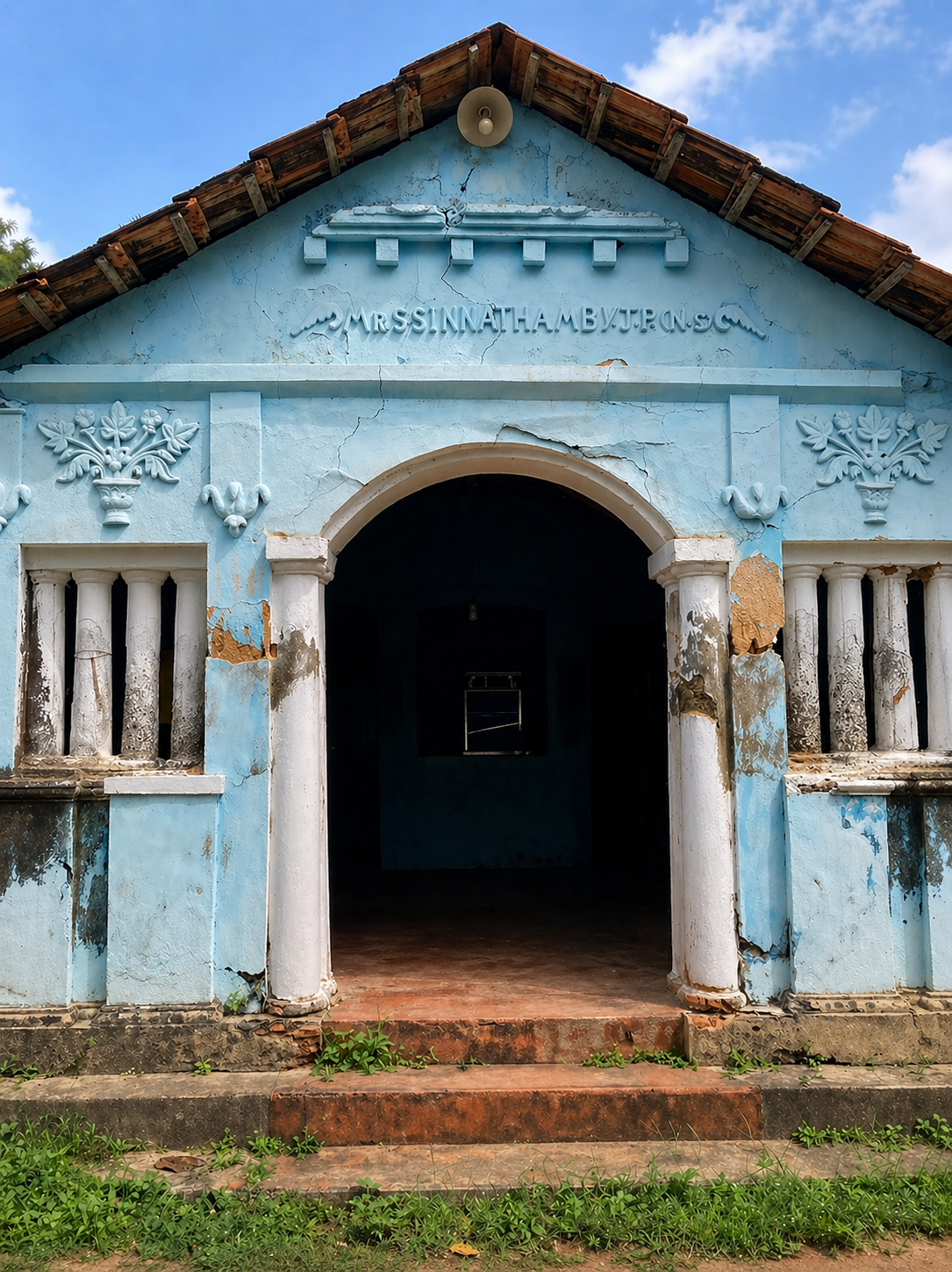
Facade of the ancestral house of S. Rajaratnam in Siththankerny, Vaddukoddai, Jaffna District, built by his father in 1922 near the site of the cottage where he was born in 1915; the cottage no longer exists.

Sinnathamby Rajaratnam (Note: Tamil: சின்னத்தம்பி ராஜரத்தினம், romanized: Ciṉṉattampi Rājarattiṉam; Chinese: 辛纳坦比·拉惹勒南; pinyin: Xīnnàtǎnbǐ Lārělēinán) (25 February 1915 – 22 February 2006) was a Singaporean statesman, journalist and diplomat. He served as the first Minister for Foreign Affairs from 1965 until 1980, and subsequently as the 2nd Deputy Prime Minister of Singapore from 1980 to 1985. Rajaratnam was pivotal in shaping Singapore's foreign policy framework during its formative years of sovereignty, helping secure the nation's position on the global stage. Alongside his foreign affairs portfolio, he also served as Minister for Culture from 1959 to 1965, Minister for Labour from 1968 to 1971, Deputy Prime Minister from 1980 to 1985 and Senior Minister from 1985 to 1988. Throughout his entire political career, he represented the constituency of Kampong Glam. Rajaratnam is remembered for authoring the Singapore National Pledge in 1966. Rajaratnam is widely recognised as one of the founding fathers of modern Singapore and a key architect of ASEAN.

A founding member of the People's Action Party (PAP), which has governed Singapore continuously since independence, Rajaratnam was deeply involved in the country's political transformation. He was among the pioneering leaders responsible for securing self-governance of Singapore from the British Empire in 1959 and navigating the complex process leading to the independence of Singapore from Malaysia in 1965. His statesmanship extended beyond national borders as one of the five founding fathers of the Association of Southeast Asian Nations (ASEAN) in 1967, an organisation created to promote regional cooperation and peace in Southeast Asia.

Rajaratnam's legacy is commemorated through several institutions bearing his name, reflecting his lasting impact on Singapore's development. These include the S. Rajaratnam School of International Studies at Nanyang Technological University (NTU), a centre dedicated to research and education in international relations, as well as the S. Rajaratnam block of Raffles Institution, honouring his contributions to education and public service. His career remains emblematic of pragmatic governance and diplomatic foresight during a formative period in Singapore's history.

== Early life and education ==
Rajaratnam was born in Vaddukoddai, Jaffna District, British Ceylon in 1915, the second child of Sabapathy Pillai Sinnathamby and his wife N. Annamah, both of Jaffna Tamil descent. His father wished for him to be born there for auspicious reasons following the premature death of his elder brother. Soon after his birth, Rajaratnam was taken back to Malaya and raised in Seremban and Selangor. His younger brother, S. Seevaratnam, was born in Seremban and went on to become a founding member of the Democratic Action Party (DAP). His nephew, Vijayaratnam Seevaratnam, was affiliated with the Parti Gerakan Rakyat Malaysia.

Rajaratnam received his early education at St. Paul's Institution, followed by studies at Victoria Institution in Kuala Lumpur and Raffles Institution in Singapore. In 1937, he enrolled at King's College London to pursue a degree in law. However, due to the outbreak of World War II and the resulting financial constraints within his family, he was unable to continue his studies. Instead, he turned to journalism to support himself in Singapore.

== Writing career ==
In London, Rajaratnam wrote a series of short stories that received favourable reviews from J. B. Trend of The Spectator. He also gained the attention of George Orwell, who was then working in the Indian Section of the BBC's Eastern Service and recruited him to contribute scripts for the network. Rajaratnam's short stories, written primarily in the 1940s, were published in literary journals and anthologies and explored themes of poverty, social injustice, leadership and community in South and Southeast Asia.

One of his short stories was included in the 1947 anthology A World of Great Stories: 115 Stories, The Best of Modern Literature, which also featured works by Ernest Hemingway, William Faulkner, F. Scott Fitzgerald and Rabindranath Tagore.

His short stories and radio plays were later collected and published by Epigram Books in The Short Stories & Radio Plays of S. Rajaratnam (2011).

== Journalistic career ==
Rajaratnam returned to Singapore in 1948 when he joined The Malaya Tribune and stopped writing short stories. In 1950, he joined Singapore Tiger Standard that was founded by Aw Boon Haw. In 1954, he joined The Straits Times as a journalist. He was bold in writing about the way Singapore was governed by the British. This incurred the displeasure of the colonial government. His column, "I write as I please", attracted so much attention that he was called for questioning by Gerald Templer, who tried to cow him by showing him a gun in his desk drawer.

== Political career ==
In 1954, Rajaratnam co-founded the People's Action Party (PAP) together with Lee Kuan Yew, Toh Chin Chye, Goh Keng Swee and others. He became popular among his supporters for being able to effectively follow the "mood of the people". He thought of a multiracial Singapore and envisioned her to be a "global city". He was also actively involved in organising major political campaigns against far-left political groups in Singapore.

Rajaratnam had served in the Cabinet as Minister for Culture in 1959, Minister for Foreign Affairs between 1965 and 1980, Minister for Labour between 1968 and 1971, Deputy Prime Minister between 1980 and 1985, and Senior Minister between 1985 and 1988.

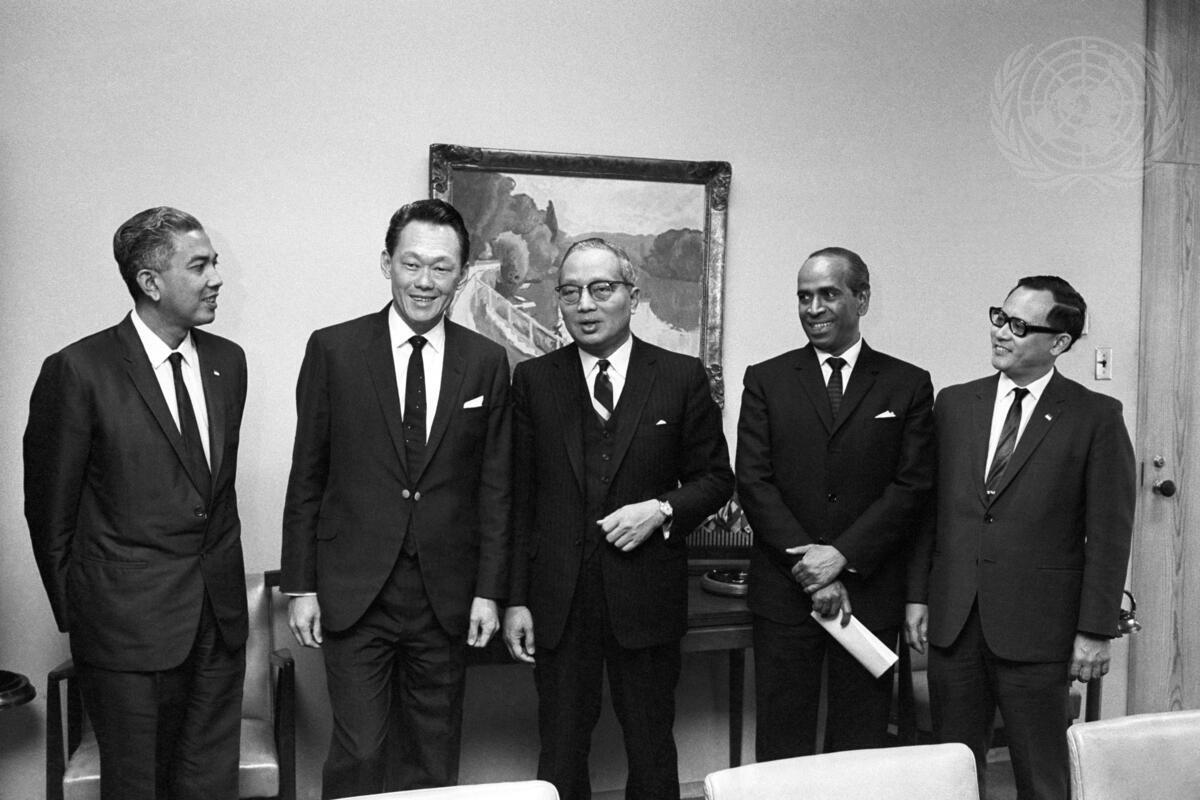
Prime Minister of Singapore Visits UN Headquarters on 1967-10-21: Seen here, from left: Inche Rahim Ishak (Abdul Rahim Ishak), Minister of State for Education of Singapore; Prime Minister Lee Kuan Yew; Secretary-General U Thant; S. Rajaratnam, Minister of Foreign Affairs of Singapore; and Ambassador Wong Lin Ken, Permanent Representative of Singapore to the United Nations.

Rajaratnam was Singapore's first Foreign Minister, following its abrupt independence in 1965. During his tenure as Minister for Foreign Affairs, Rajaratnam helped Singapore gain entry into the United Nations and later the Non-Aligned Movement in 1970. He built up the Ministry of Foreign Affairs and helped to establish diplomatic relations with other countries and secure international recognition of Singapore's sovereignty. He carried out the foreign policy of international self-assertion to establish Singapore's independence during the period when the country faced significant challenges including the Konfrontasi conflict in the 1960s and the withdrawal of British troops in the early 1970s. Rajaratnam was one of the five "founding fathers" of the Association of Southeast Asian Nations (ASEAN) in 1967. In this diplomatic arena together with the United Nations, he helped to draw international attention to the Vietnamese invasion of Cambodia in 1978. At the 1979 Non-Aligned Movement Summit in Havana, Rajaratnam led Singapore's opposition to the Vietnamese-backed Heng Samrin government in Cambodia. According to diplomat Kishore Mahbubani, Rajaratnam strongly challenged efforts by Cuba and other Soviet-aligned states to recognise the Cambodian delegation installed following Vietnam's invasion of Cambodia. Despite the delegation's acceptance within the Non-Aligned Movement, it subsequently failed to secure Cambodia's seat at the United Nations General Assembly.

Rajaratnam was also the first Singapore leader to visit the People's Republic of China in March 1975, where he met Chinese Premier Zhou Enlai. He later welcomed China's economic modernisation and expressed the view that a prosperous and modernised China would have positive consequences for the global economy.

Rajaratnam was a leading advocate of an independent and non-aligned foreign policy for Singapore. He argued that alignment with a major power could compromise the foreign-policy autonomy of small states, and maintained that non-alignment allowed countries such as Singapore to adopt positions based on the merits of individual international issues rather than the interests of larger powers.

Consistent with his policy of maintaining relations with all major powers, Rajaratnam visited the Soviet Union in 1976, where he met Soviet Foreign Minister Andrei Gromyko. According to diplomat Kishore Mahbubani, Rajaratnam emphasised that although Singapore was non-communist domestically, its foreign policy was not anti-communist and sought constructive relations with both Western and communist states.

Rajaratnam opposed the inclusion of Sri Lanka for ASEAN membership in 1967 based on the country's domestic situation which was unstable and not good for a new organisation.

During his tenure as Minister for Labour, Rajaratnam implemented tough labour laws to attempt to restore stability in the Singapore's economy and attracted multinational corporations to invest in Singapore.

Throughout his political career, Rajaratnam had played a key role in the pragmatic and technocratic PAP government that radically improved Singapore's economic situation, alongside huge developments in social development on the island with massive expansion of healthcare programmes, pensions, public housing and maintaining an extremely low unemployment rate. This is well underlined by his following statement:

"We believe in a democratic society by governments freely and periodically elected by the people... We believe, in the virtue of hard work and that those who work harder in society should be given greater rewards... We believe that the world does not owe us a living and that we have to earn our keep."

Rajaratnam remained a supporter of parliamentary democracy throughout his political career. According to later recollections by Kishore Mahbubani, he maintained that democracy, despite its imperfections, was essential to Singapore's political system and occasionally differed from Lee Kuan Yew on this issue.

According to Mahbubani, Rajaratnam encouraged frank discussion among officials and welcomed views that challenged prevailing assumptions. Mahbubani recalled that Rajaratnam frequently advised his colleagues:

"Never tell me what you think I want to hear. Always tell me what I ought to hear".

Nonetheless, Rajaratnam did not believe in the need for a strong opposition in Parliament, which he considered "non-communist subversion"; he was unapologetic about the dominant party system in Singapore saying:

"Given a one-party government, the capacity of such a government to act far more independently than if it were harassed by an opposition and by proxies, is obvious. In the game of competitive interference pawns which can behave like bishops and castles and knights can in certain circumstances be extremely inconvenient and very irritating."

Rajaratnam was a strong advocate of multiracialism and believed that national identity should transcend ethnic and communal divisions. He played a central role in the drafting of the Singapore National Pledge in 1966, two years after the 1964 racial riots. According to later accounts, Minister for Education Ong Pang Boon had initially sought his views on a proposed pledge for school flag-raising ceremonies, after which Rajaratnam substantially rewrote the text, shifting its emphasis from the individual “I” to the collective “we”.

The final pledge reflected Rajaratnam’s longstanding commitment to multiracialism and national unity, including the phrase “One united people, regardless of race, language or religion”, which later became one of the defining expressions of Singapore’s national identity.

In the 1980s and 1990s, when the government began implementing several policies to promote the use of "mother tongue" languages and ethnic-based self-help groups such as Chinese Development Assistance Council (CDAC) and Yayasan Mendaki, Rajaratnam expressed his opposition to these policies which, in his view, ran counter to the vision of establishing a common Singapore identity where "when race, religion, language does not matter". He advocated for greater racial integration which he felt was still lacking in the country.

While he supported efforts to improve the socio-economic conditions of minority communities, Rajaratnam expressed concern that policies promoting ethnic-based self-help groups and rigid ethnic categorisation could weaken the development of a common Singaporean identity. He cautioned against approaches that reinforced communal divisions or encouraged Singaporeans to define themselves primarily through race or ancestry, and expressed reservations about the growing prominence of the Chinese-Malay-Indian-Others (CMIO) framework. Rajaratnam argued that Singaporean identity should transcend ethnic classifications and described being Singaporean as "not a matter of ancestry" but one of "conviction and choice".

Rajaratnam also disagreed with Prime Minister Lee Kuan Yew on the policy of giving incentives to women who are college graduates to have more children, as he felt that the policy was unfair. Despite their differences in opinion on certain issues, Rajaratnam was loyal to Lee and remained as a member of the "core team" of Lee's government which included Goh Keng Swee, Hon Sui Sen and Lim Kim San, and they dominated Singapore's political scene from 1959 to the mid-1980s.

== Personal life ==
Rajaratnam first met his wife, Piroska Feher, a Hungarian teacher, while studying in London and married in 1943. Feher's grandmother was a member of the wealthy Csáky clan who had lost their fortune due to the dissolution of the Austro-Hungarian Empire after the First World War. Piroska, disgruntled by the rise of Nazism, moved to the United Kingdom where she worked as an au pair and teacher and eventually met Rajaratnam. Former Member of the European Parliament Gyula Hegyi is her nephew.

The couple moved to Malaya at the conclusion of the Second World War but Rajaratnam's parents disapproved of their new daughter-in-law, even telling her that they would not accept "half-caste" descendants. They did not have any children and remained married until her death in 1989 from pulmonary pneumonia at the age of 76.

The marriage was later described by biographer Irene Ng as reflective of Rajaratnam’s broader commitment to multiracialism and his belief that identity should transcend ethnic and communal boundaries.

After Rajaratnam retired from politics in 1988 as part of the leadership transition, he served at the Institute of Southeast Asian Studies as Distinguished Senior Fellow from between 1989 and 1997.

In 1994, Rajaratnam was diagnosed with dementia and was unable to move or talk by 2001. He was assisted by six maids, including his long-time maid of 21 years, Cecelia Tandoc.

== Death and legacy ==
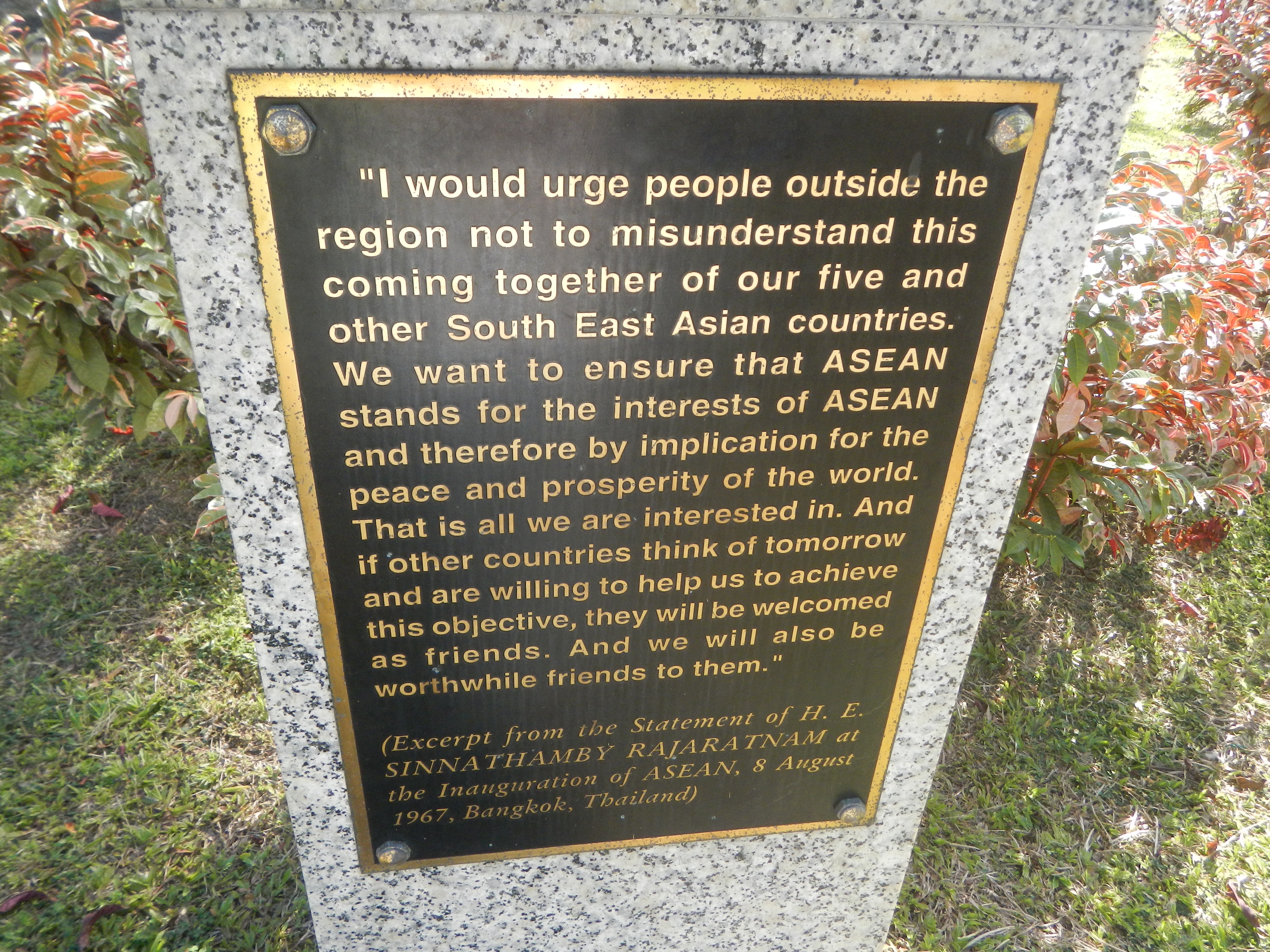
Bust of S. Rajaratnam at the ASEAN Garden with the excerpt from his statement at the inauguration of ASEAN.

Rajaratnam died on 22 February 2006 of heart failure at his residence at Chancery Lane in Bukit Timah.

=== Honours and legacy ===
Launched on 21 October 2014, the S$100-million S. Rajaratnam Endowment was set up by Temasek Holdings to support programmes that foster international and regional cooperation. Its chairman, Wong Kan Seng, said that the values that Rajaratnam stood for as Singapore's first Foreign Minister are even more relevant today.

==== Film appearances ====
Rajaratnam is a central character in Two Meetings and a Funeral, a film about the Nonaligned Movement by Naeem Mohaiemen. Rajaratnam's call for developing economies to become technology sufficient, rather than depending on the technology of the west is featured in the film.

==== Books on S. Rajaratnam ====
Former Singapore Parliamentarian Irene Ng authored two books on Rajaratnam, The Singapore Lion in 2010 and The Lion's Roar in 2024.

- Ng, Irene (2010), The Singapore Lion: A Biography of S. Rajaratnam, Institute of Southeast Asian Studies, ISBN 978-9-8142-7951-2
- Ng, Irene (2024), S. Rajaratnam, The Authorised Biography, Volume Two: The Lion's Roar, Iseas Publishing, ISBN 978-9-8151-0465-3

==== ChatBook featuring S. Rajaratnam ====
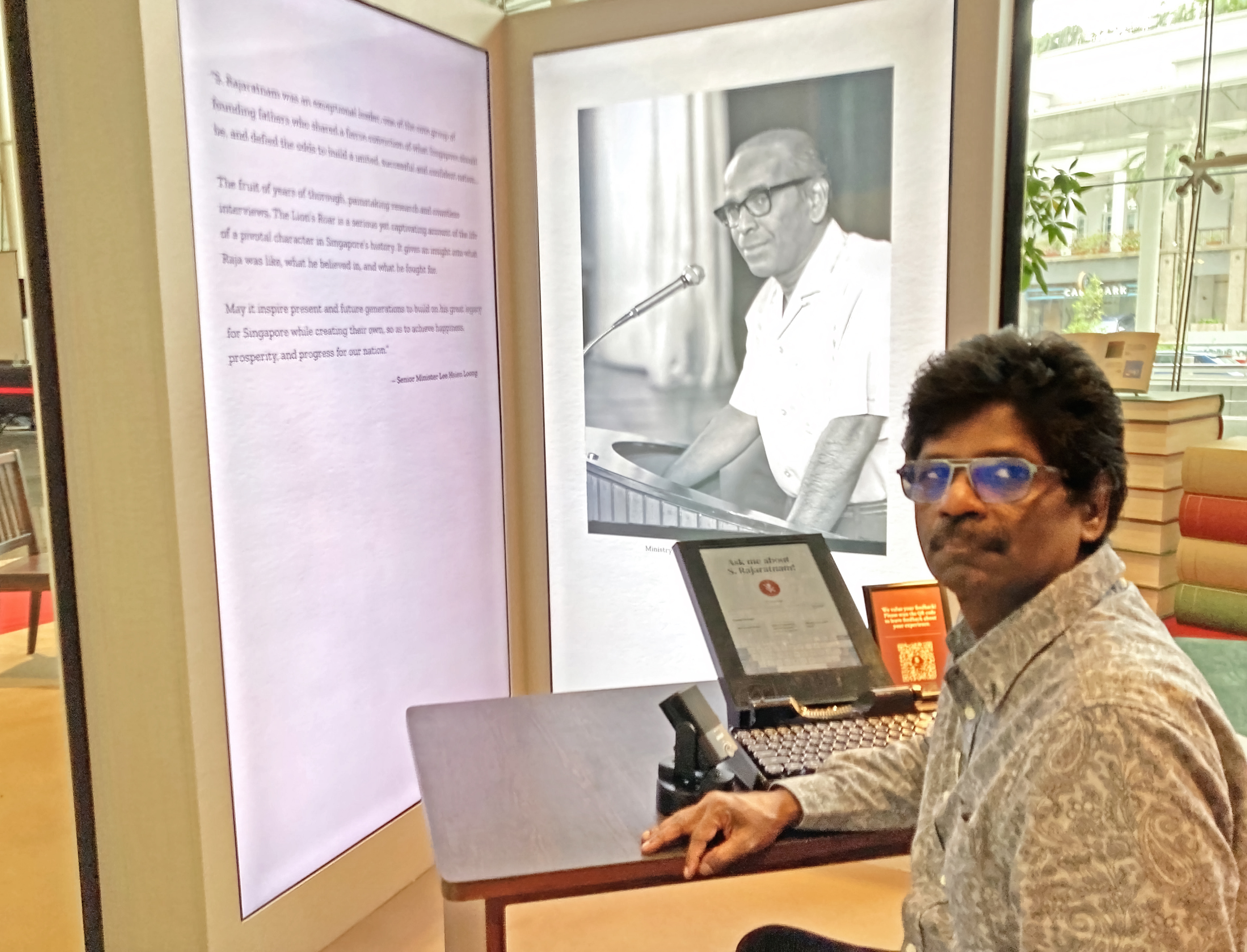
Rajkumar Kanagasingam, the founding president of the Fintech Association of Sri Lanka and a relative of S. Rajaratnam, is depicted reading the ChatBook.

The National Library of Singapore displayed a generative AI-powered ChatBook (book-like device) featuring Rajaratnam from October to November 2024. The showcase was inaugurated by Lawrence Wong, the Prime Minister of Singapore, during the launching of the second volume of Rajaratnam's biography, The Lion's Roar, authored by Irene Ng.

Singapore's Senior Minister and former Prime Minister, Lee Hsien Loong, who attended the showcase, said:

"Rajaratnam belonged to the core group of Founding Fathers who shared fierce conviction of what Singapore should be, and defied the odds to build a united, successful, and confident nation. It is befitting that NLB has made this ChatBook prototype publicly available with Rajaratnam's materials."

== Notes and references ==
Political offices
New office	Minister for Culture; 5 June 1959 – 9 August 1965	Succeeded by Othman Wok
New office	Minister for Foreign Affairs; 9 August 1965 – 1 June 1980	Succeeded by S. Dhanabalan
Preceded by Jek Yeun Thong	Minister for Labour; 16 April 1968 – 5 July 1971	Succeeded by Ong Pang Boon
Vacant Title last held by Toh Chin Chye	Deputy Prime Minister of Singapore; 2 January 1985 – 3 September 1988; Served alongside: Goh Keng Swee, Ong Teng Cheong	Succeeded by Goh Chok Tong
New office	Senior Minister; 2 January 1985 – 3 September 1988	Vacant Title next held by Lee Kuan Yew; 1990
Parliament of Singapore
New constituency	Member of Parliament for Kampong Glam SMC; 1959–1991	Succeeded by Loh Meng See
Parliament of Malaysia
New constituency	Member of the Dewan Rakyat for Singapore; 1963–1965	Constituency abolished
