= Malayan Forum =

Malaysian and Singaporean group (1949–1962)

- Successor: People's Action Party (PAP)
- Founded: 1949; 77 years ago
- Dissolved: 1962; 64 years ago
- Headquarters: London

The Malayan Forum was an influential political discussion group established in 1949 by ethnic Chinese and Malay university students from British Malaya studying in London. It played a significant role in shaping the modern political trajectories of Singapore and Malaysia. The forum was motivated by concerns over continued British Empire rule in the region. Although it was not an actual political party and its members held diverse ideological viewpoints, they were united by a common anti-colonial stance.

Among its founders were Abdul Razak Hussein, who later became the Prime Minister of Malaysia; Goh Keng Swee, recognised as a founding father of Singapore; and Maurice Baker, who went on to serve as Singapore's ambassador to India, Nepal, Malaysia and the Philippines. The Malayan Forum is often regarded as an informal predecessor to Singapore's People's Action Party (PAP) and, indirectly, to Malaysia's Democratic Action Party (DAP), particularly following the separation of Singapore from Malaysia when the Malayan remnants of the PAP contributed to the formation of the DAP.
