= David Marshall (Singaporean politician) =

Chief Minister of Singapore from 1955 to 1956

The Honourable David Marshall PJG
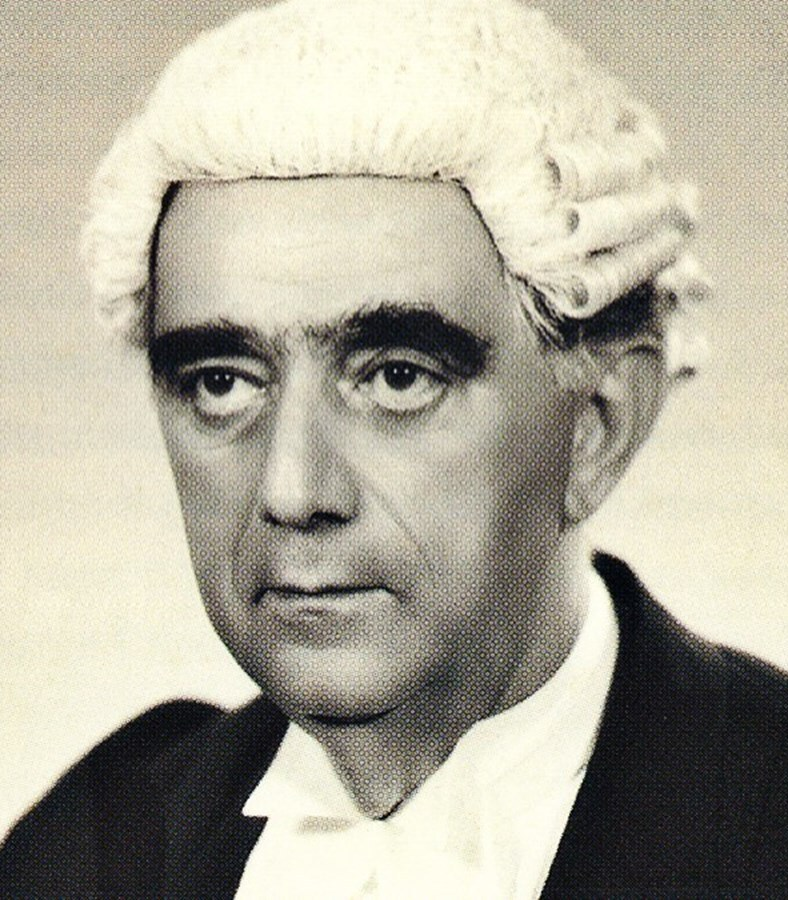
- Allen & Gledhill portrait, c. 1938–1942

1st Chief Minister of Singapore
- In office 7 April 1955 – 7 June 1956
- Monarch: Elizabeth II
- Governor: Sir John Nicoll; Sir Robin Black
- Preceded by: Office established
- Succeeded by: Lim Yew Hock (LF)

1st Chairman of the Workers' Party
- In office 3 November 1957 – 18 January 1963
- Preceded by: Position established
- Succeeded by: Chiang Seok Keong (acting); Heng Swee Tong

Member of the Legislative Assembly for Anson Constituency
- In office 20 July 1961 – 3 September 1963
- Preceded by: Mohammed Baharuddin Ariff (PAP)
- Succeeded by: Perumal Govindaswamy (PAP)
- Majority: 1961: 3,598 (43.32%)

Member of the Legislative Assembly for Cairnhill Constituency
- In office 22 April 1955 – 29 April 1957
- Preceded by: Constituency established
- Succeeded by: Soh Ghee Soon (SPA)
- Majority: 1955: 3,305 (47.58%)

Personal details
- Born: David Saul Mashal; 12 March 1908 Singapore, Straits Settlements (present-day Selegie Road, Singapore)
- Died: 12 December 1995 (aged 87) Singapore
- Cause of death: Lung cancer
- Resting place: Choa Chu Kang Jewish Cemetery
- Party: Progressive Party (1947–1953); Labour Front (1954–1957); Worker's Party (1957–1963); Independent (1963–1995)
- Spouse: Jean Mary Gray (m. 1961)
- Children: 4
- Education: University of London

David Saul Marshall (né Mashal; 12 March 1908 – 12 December 1995) was a Singaporean lawyer, politician, and diplomat who served as the first chief minister of Singapore from April 1955 to June 1956. He resigned after just over a year into his chief ministership after the British rejected his delegation to London regarding negotiations for Singapore's self-governance.

Born in colonial Singapore to Jewish parents, Marshall studied at Saint Andrew's Secondary School and Raffles Institution. He attended the University of London in 1934, returning to Singapore in 1937 to begin his law practice. In 1938, Marshall began volunteering with the Singapore Volunteer Corps. Following the surrender of Singapore, Marshall became a prisoner-of-war and was interned at Changi Prison before being sent to Japan. He returned to Singapore in 1946 after Japan's surrender. He joined the newly created Progressive Party (PP) the following year, but left in 1953 following disputes with the party and its leader C. C. Tan. He then founded the Labour Front (LF) with Lim Yew Hock and Francis Thomas, serving as its first chairman. The LF contested at the 1955 general election, where they won the most seats with 10, and Marshall was named the first chief minister as the LF's leader.

As chief minister, Marshall faced strikes and riots, a constitutional crisis, and internal problems with the LF. His main goal was obtaining self-governance, and he led a delegation to London in 1956 to hold constitutional talks with British authorities. However, the talks broke down and he subsequently resigned as chief minister, having promised to do so if he did not achieve self-governance. He remained a backbencher and was succeeded by Lim. Marshall resigned from the LF and the Legislative Assembly in 1957 and founded the Workers' Party (WP). He contested at the 1959 general election, where he lost to Lim, but won Anson at the 1961 by-elections. Marshall resigned from the WP following internal disputes and lost his seat at the following election.

Afterwards, Marshall left politics and returned to law. In 1978, he became a diplomat; he was Singapore's inaugural ambassador to various countries, including France, Portugal, Spain, and Switzerland. During this time he defended Singapore's interests abroad, despite his old political opponent Lee Kuan Yew of the People's Action Party having long led the government as prime minister. Nevertheless, he publicly maintained constructive criticism of some domestic policies with which he disagreed. Marshall retired in 1993 and died two years later at the age of 87.

== Early life and education ==
Marshall was born on Selegie Road in British colonial Singapore as David Saul Mashal on 12 March 1908, the second child of seven to Baghdadi Jewish parents Saul Nassim and Flora Ezekiel Mashal (née Guston). Saul Mashal arrived in Singapore in 1900 from Baghdad and established a business at Change Alley. He was a Sephardic Jew of Spanish descent from Ottoman Iraq. His business was financially successful, and he later brought his wife Flora over to Singapore. In 1920, the family anglicised their name to Marshall on the advice of their doctor.

Marshall's parents were ultra-orthodox Jews and he was given a strict Jewish upbringing, going to the synagogue and observing the Sabbath; he had his bar mitzvah when he was thirteen. Marshall attended kindergarten at the Convent of the Holy Infant Jesus at Victoria Street, where he faced anti-semitism. After kindergarten, he began studying at Saint Joseph's Institution in 1918, but was expelled a year later for skipping class. He then enrolled at Saint Andrew's Secondary School, studying until Standard VII, before transferring to Raffles Institution in 1923 for their science facilities. He planned to obtain a Queen's Scholarship for a medical degree in 1925, but fell ill before his examinations and was unable to take them. He was sent to Switzerland to recover.

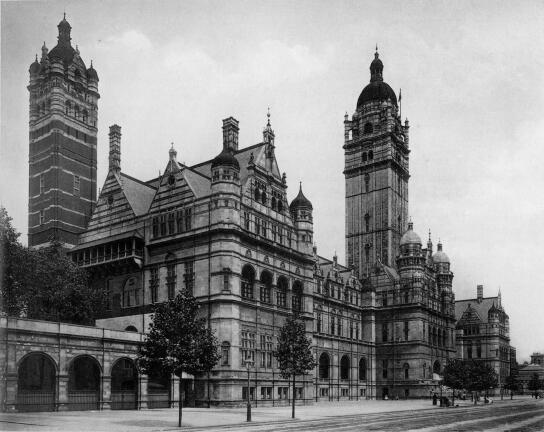
Marshall studied at the University of London (pictured) from September 1934 to March 1936.

Upon his return to Singapore, Marshall began working at a stockbroker's firm in 1926, but contracted tuberculosis and returned to Switzerland again. He recovered eight months later, travelling to Renaix, Belgium, to study textile manufacturing. Marshall travelled overseas again before returning to Singapore in 1930, during the Great Depression. He began saving money to pursue an overseas education. Upon reaching his monetary goals, he decided to study law in London, attending the University of London in September 1934. To get his law degree and join the Bar at the same time, Marshall registered himself with Middle Temple and took his Bachelor of Laws at the University of London externally.

Eighteen months after his arrival, Marshall passed the Bar's finals with honours. He planned to immediately return to Singapore to begin working, but had to participate in eighteen months worth of dinners (now known as qualifying sessions) with Middle Temple before he could be admitted with them; he was given an exemption of six months after conferring with Middle Temple's under treasurer. Marshall returned to Singapore in 1937.

== Law career and war service ==
Upon his return, Marshall was called to the bar in February the next year. He joined law firm Rodyk & Davidson with a monthly salary of S$500.00. However, he discovered that Rodyk & Davison's chief clerk was paid S$400.00 more than him, and he considered it prejudice for being a local. Marshall subsequently applied to join Aitken & Ong Siang, a law firm co-founded by Sir Song Ong Siang, a prominent member of the Chinese community. Marshall's father got Song to accept a special arrangement for his son; he would be paid no salary and had to pay for his own desk space, office supplies, and secretarial services. Despite this, in his first month, Marshall made S$700.00. To establish himself in the community, he began taking cases at a low cost of S$75.00, eventually charging up to S$300.00 per case as his reputation grew.

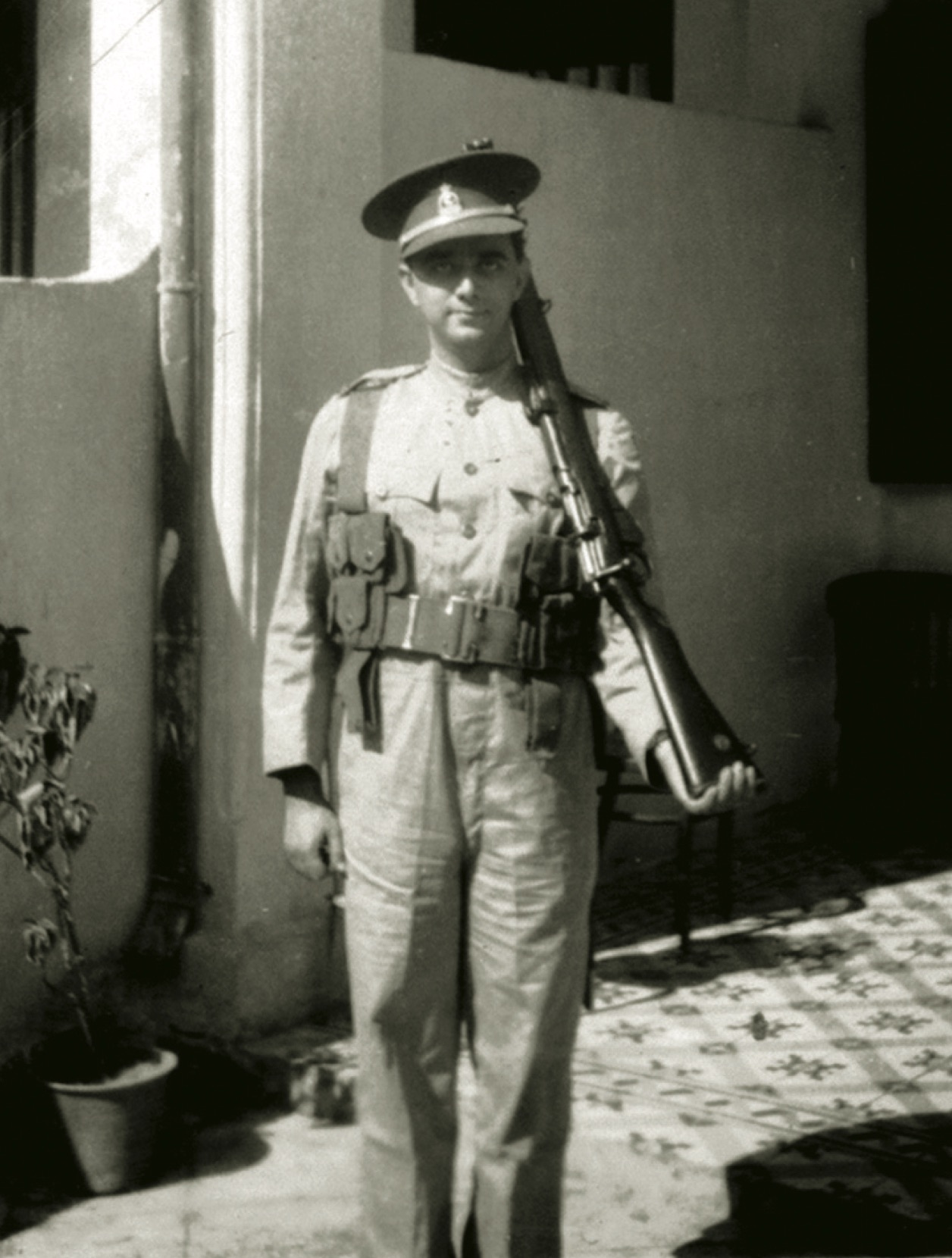
Marshall with "B" Company, c. 1938–1942

In October 1938, concluding that the Japanese would soon attack Southeast Asia, Marshall decided to volunteer with the Singapore Volunteer Corps (SVC), a branch of the larger Straits Settlements Volunteer Force (SSVF). Within the SVC, Marshall was assigned to the "D" Company, which consisted largely of Eurasians. He objected to this assignment as he was being grouped with Eurasians despite being a Jew and he raised the matter to the commanding officer. Marshall was subsequently transferred to the "B" Company, a European unit that included Czechs, Yugoslavs, and Poles. With "B" Company, Marshall discovered that he was paid a daily salary of S$0.50, which corresponded to the "Asian" salary, as compared to his fellow European colleagues who earned the "European" salary of S$1.04 daily. After complaining to the commandant about this disparity, he was confined to his barracks, but found his pay increased by S$0.55 more.

During his training with the SVC, Marshall found their schedule to have interfered heavily with his law career and he was unable to continue his business with Aitken & Ong Siang. He applied to join Allen & Gledhill as an assistant as their schedule was more convenient for him, and he was hired with a monthly salary of S$750.00, the highest at the time for a non-European. He trained weekly with "B" Company at Beach Road. Following the possibility of the war affecting Singapore, by 1941 Marshall had sent his family to Perth to avoid it, with only his mother staying with him in Singapore.

=== World War II and prisoner-of-war ===
In December 1941, Marshall was mobilised following the Japanese bombing of Singapore. From his camp in Geylang Serai, he and many others initially mistook the air-raid sirens for a drill, as the street lights remained on. During that time, Singapore's support for the British was still high, but diminished after learning that the Prince of Wales and Repulse had been sunk. Marshall's role at "B" Company was a runner, as he was regarded to have made noise like a "baby elephant" and ran through active bombing. On 15 February 1942, the day of the British's surrender to the Japanese, he relayed the news to outlying units. After the official surrender at 8:30 pm that day, Marshall, as part of the SSVF, was with a southern garrison that included the 1st and 2nd Malayan Infantry Brigades. On 17 February, he was marched from Pierce Road to Changi Prison as a prisoner-of-war (POW). At Changi, the POWs frequently suffered from a lack of food, water, shelter, and blankets; after only a few months there, Marshall dropped from 172 pounds (78 kg) to 118 pounds (54 kg). His food was typically rice with boll weevils.

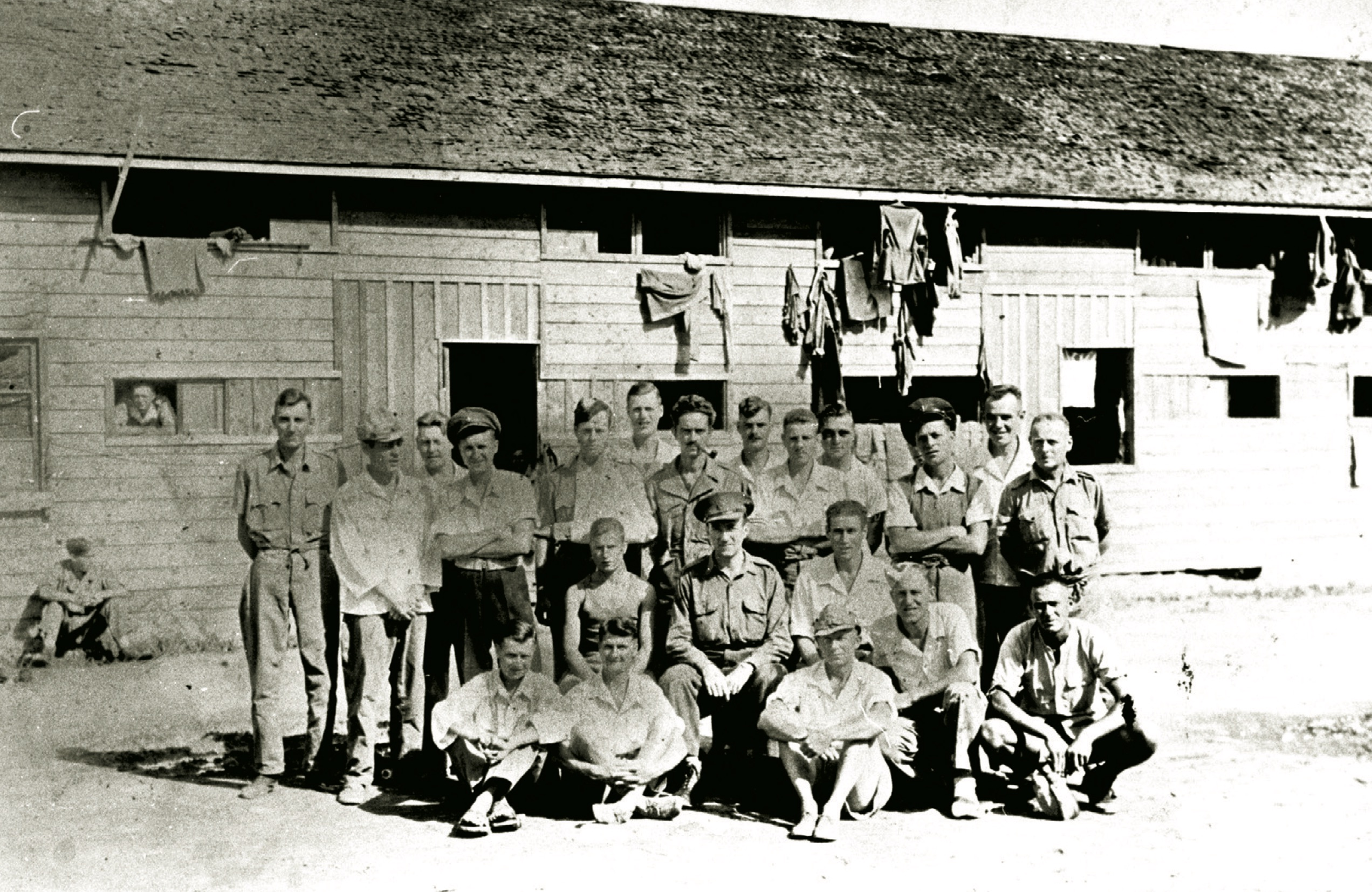
The POWs at Nisi-Asibetsu, c. 1945. Marshall is the one with the pipe near the centre.

After fifteen months at Changi, Marshall was transferred to a camp at Serangoon Road Race Course, which only had around 3,000 POWs as compared to Changi's 30,000. He spent his time cutting grass for the Japaneses' horses. In August 1942, the Japanese began distributing POWs to camps in Japan and Taiwan, while sending others to Burma and Siam to work on the Death Railway. In May 1943, Marshall was part of 2,000 POWs drafted to Japan. It took three weeks to reach Honshu by boat, after which they were sent to an industrial camp in Hakodate, Hokkaido. This camp's conditions were poor, and they were subsequently moved to Yakumo, then to Muroran, and lastly to Nisi-Asibetsu.

At Nisi-Asibetsu, the prisoners worked at coal mines for the Japanese. By that time, however, Marshall had grown too physically weak to mine and was instead assigned to a pick and shovel group. His duties primarily involved clearing land for airfields and transporting iron delivered from Manchuria. By 1944, as Japan's position in the war began to deteriorate, A Chinese POW who could read Japanese relayed information from Japanese papers he found in the colonel's office, informing Marshall of the situation. Following this period, Marshall and his camp began receiving food and supplies from Red Cross parcels and American planes. After Japan's surrender, American officials sent Marshall to Manila, where he gave statements of the conditions during the war and requested repatriation to Perth to reunite with his family. By then, he only weighed 107 pounds (49 kg). He remained with his family in Perth briefly before returning to Singapore in February 1946.

=== Post-World War II career ===
Marshall found that his original home had been destroyed and looted during the war. Despite widespread unemployment and economic hardships under the British Military Administration (BMA), Marshall was able to resume his legal practice without difficulty, rejoining Allen & Gledhill, which was experiencing increased demand for legal services following the war. Immediately after he joined Allen & Gledhill, his friend Gerald de Cruz recruited him for the Malayan Democratic Union (MDU), a political party that aimed for internal self-governance and public reforms. De Cruz assumed that Marshall would join without delay, but Marshall declined, stating that he required time to recover and rebuild his life after the war.

In the post-war period, Marshall also became active within Singapore's Jewish community. He helped establish the Jewish Welfare Board (JWB), an organisation which focused on Jewish interests and issues. Marshall served as its first president on 27 June 1946, being re-elected to the position over the next six years. JWB created an old folk's home at Waterloo Street and formed a Transient's Committee to aid Jewish immigrants travelling through Singapore. With JWB, Marshall remained unaffiliated with politics; he tended to receive visiting Israeli officials, but remained non-partisan.

Following the BMA's choice to not recognise the Japanese government's "banana currency", many who had saved up this type of money were practically poor in post-Japanese occupation Singapore. This included many members of the SVC, who were waiting for payments of their salaries by the British that were interrupted during the Japanese occupation, along with the return of their properties. In March 1946, the British announced that it would pay back members of the British government and army up to £1,500 (equivalent to £54,316 in 2025) per person, for the period of their internment during the war in Malaya. This upset those who had not been interned, mostly consisting of Asians, and the fact that locals were paid less than European POWs, which raised issues on racial discrimination.

As a result, Marshall was involved with other POWs who were against this scheme and they founded the War Prisoners' (Singapore) Association (WPA) on 24 April 1946, with Marshall serving as the honorary secretary. The WPA included POWs, internees, political prisoners, and civilian prisoners, with their main goals focusing on compensation of people affected by the war. As the WPA's secretary, Marshall found himself acting as their main spokesperson, and he typically commented critically on the colonial government. The demographic makeup of WPA had a majority of Europeans, which caused accusations against Marshall of working towards European interests, although most of the Europeans members were poor and the WPA additionally focused on affected Chinese, Eurasian, and Indian POWs.

In August 1946, Secretary of State for the Colonies George Hall stated that they would repudiate civil liability claims made by SVC volunteers. In response, the WPA informed Governor Franklin Gimson in November that the liability claims were still in force as they had not been repealed and asked Gimson to set up a tribunal. Marshall stated in an interview with The Straits Times that Gimson was talking to Attorney-General John Davies, but that "we have not heard from the Governor since then [but were] awaiting his promised communication." In March 1947, he sent a letter on behalf of the WPA to Secretary of State for the Colonies Arthur Creech Jones, writing: "I must be forgiven if I sometimes gather the impression that there is no government in this colony, only a bureaucracy of lazy clerks."

From the late 1940s to early 1950s, Marshall's law career proved to be successful, and he became recognised as a prominent lawyer. In January 1950, by then a partner with Allen & Gledhill, Marshall decided to pursue his original goal of studying medicine. After receiving a correspondence from the University of Sydney, he traveled to Australia to explore this possibility. Upon arrival, he visited his family in Perth, where he met a psychiatrist called White. (Note: Marshall could not recall his full name, and refers to him only as "White".) Marshall sought White's advice about specialising in psychiatry, and was provided with several books on psychiatric theories, particularly relating to the concept of time, for him to read. After reading them, Marshall found the subject difficult to grasp and concluded that psychiatry was not for him. He subsequently abandoned his plans to study medicine and decided to return to his law career in Singapore; he had received a letter from Battenberg & Talma and joined them on 26 January 1950 as a junior partner.

Despite a slow return to his legal practice, by the end of 1950, Marshall had made over S$66,000 for Battenberg & Talma. From 1951 to 1954, his monthly earnings was around S$11,300, which was among the highest pay for a lawyer for the time. In August 1953, amidst a thriving law practice, he entered a new partnership agreement with Battenberg & Talma, but by the end of the year he faced challenges with them. There were discussions in 1954 of disbanding Marshall's partnership; the firm's partners did not appreciate his "undignified relations with the masses" as he became more involved with politics. He eventually left the firm in March 1955.

== Early political involvement ==
=== Progressive Party ===
In the late 1940s, after Marshall rejected to join the MDU, he decided to join the Singapore Association (Note: The SA was the successor of the Straits Settlements (Singapore) Association, a prominent body in pre-war Singapore that was known for being involved in talks of the colony's progress.) (SA) through his legal connections after a growing interest in local affairs. He officially joined them in June 1947, after being elected to its committee following Roland Braddell's election as president. Early in his involvement, Marshall opposed the implementation of income tax, a stance that contrasted with later views. Financial secretary W. D. Godsall had proposed the tax to recuperate losses spent in post-war rehabilitation, but Marshall argued that income tax could be avoided and instead suggested a tax on the colony's remittances. He was also active with the Singapore Ratepayers' Association (SRA), which largely consisted of landlords and Europeans, that focused on reducing light, gas, and water costs.

In the lead up to the 1948 general election, political parties began to be formed. As the SA mainly represented European views, they decided to form a party to contest as they feared that the election would elect a majority of Asians into the Legislative Council and thus misrepresent their views. In May 1947, SA member E. R. Koek proposed the creation of the Progressive Party (PP) to advocate liberalist views. After Marshall was elected into their committee in June, Braddell supported Koek's suggestion, and the SA formed the PP with the Straits Chinese British Association on 25 August 1947. The PP consisted largely of legal professionals such as C. C. Tan, John Laycock, N. A. Mallal, and A. P. Rajah, who were all founder members. Marshall applied for the PP in October 1949 and became a member on 3 November, feeling obliged as a member of the SA and due to his personal connections with lawyers such as Laycock.

After Marshall briefly left to Australia and returned in January 1950, his continued time with PP eventually led him to have conflicting views with its members. In his early involvement, PP members such as Laycock, Mallal, and Tan Soon Kim saw Marshall as a potential candidate, though he declined to stand. Sometime in the early 1950s, after the Legislative Council announced the Rent Control Ordinance, Marshall and other members of the SRA opposed its introduction, which saw support from other local groups. During the campaigning period of the 1951 general election, the Rent Control Ordinance was brought up, and the PP portrayed themselves as supporting the tenants. However, Singapore Tenants' Association secretary P. M. Williams addressed the fact that they supported the Rent Control Ordinance, which suggested that they were more in favour of the landlords instead of the tenants.

As Laycock planned to contest in Katong Constituency against independent G. H. Kiat, who was a member of the SRA, the PP held a meeting to discuss its campaigning strategy. Marshall was the only dissenter to the party's choice to depict itself as pro-tenant and using the Rent Control Ordinance against Kiat as part of their campaign; he also felt conflicted due to his existing ties to the SRA. After stating his stand at the meeting, Marshall's relationship with PP founder Tan deteriorated, as Tan perceived Marshall to be supporting their opponent. On 1 April, Tan accused Kiat of endorsing the SRA's proposal to increase rent by twenty percent. Kiat responded that he was merely following the SRA's recommendations instead of his own and that he had informed Marshall accordingly, believing Marshall had relayed this to Tan. Tan acknowledged that Marshall had informed him on this, but he did not believe him. Marshall subsequently criticised the both of them: Kiat for distrusting him and Tan for suggesting that he would misrepresent Kiat's position. The PP went on to win six of the nine seats in the 1951 general election.

By 1951, the party's beliefs began to change; in 1948, the PP had set a goal of an elected majority in the Legislature by 1951 to achieve internal self-governance, but by 1952 they withdrew this statement and did not set a new deadline. Marshall observed that they developed more pro-British views, while other organisations such as the UMNO in Malaya pressed for self-governance. Tan had written that "only fools and criminals" would want independence, to which Marshall responded "I'm not a fool [and] I'm certainly not a criminal" and wrote his support towards independence. He subsequently gave his resignation from the PP in December 1952, which was accepted by February 1953. While with the PP, Marshall was involved in the creation of the Central Provident Fund (CPF) in 1951, having suggested it to both the PP's committee and the colonial government. He later sent a memorandum to the government supporting the creation of a fund for employees. The government did not fully acknowledge his suggestion, but through the PP's representation in the Legislature, a bill for the CPF would eventually be created and passed in November 1953.

=== Labour Front ===
After he left the PP in February 1953, Marshall divided his time between the JWB, the Rent Control Board, and the Old Rafflesian Association, serving an additional presidential term for the former in April. Due to his status as a respected lawyer, Marshall soon became sought after as a member for political parties, especially since he had just left the PP. As the 1954 Rendel Constitution would soon implement more internal self-governance, the upcoming 1955 general election was seen as an avenue for political parties to control Singapore's future. The PP were predicted to be the most likely to win a majority in the upcoming election, but their maintained support was uncertain. Commissioner-General of Southeast Asia Malcolm MacDonald believed that a left-wing non-communist party would be able to maintain its political influence, but the only non-communist party at the time was the Singapore Labour Party (SLP), which was suffering from internal issues between its members; two prominent SLP members – Lim Yew Hock and Francis Thomas – later separated from the party.

Marshall began getting more involved in politics by 1953, when he attended a meeting with friends S. Rajaratnam, Alex Josey, and Han Suyin in August. He felt influenced by Rajaratnam and Han's political discussions, and decided during that he wanted to further his political career and interests; Marshall was still considering his political stand. In October, Marshall met with Lim and Thomas, and they decided to form a new political party; Marshall knew Lim as a fellow PP member and Thomas through connections with St. Andrew's School and the Rotary Club. Thomas later wrote to Marshall in November, discussing any issues with the party's formation or programmes, where it was also tentatively named the Democratic Labour Party.

"[The PAP's goals were] first to get an idea of our possible effectiveness, and second to reduce our effectiveness by keeping discussion open as long as possible so as to waste our time and make us late in getting the necessary work done."

— Francis Thomas, (Chan 1984, p. 76)

In December, Marshall, Lim, and Thomas continued to hold meetings about the party, but its official inauguration remained delayed due to plans to merge with another left-wing party. In January 1954, lawyer Lee Kuan Yew met with figures such as Goh Keng Swee, Toh Chin Chye, K. M. Byrne, and Rajaratnam to discuss forming a party which would later become the People's Action Party (PAP). Marshall and Thomas later held meetings with some of them, as they shared similar goals. However, the two parties did not get along well, with Marshall describing his and Thomas's first meeting with Lee, Goh, and Byrne as a "bitter taste". The PAP considered them to have possessed "political naivety", while Marshall saw Lee as an over-confident and mysterious person.

After their unsuccessful negotiations with the PAP, Marshall and Thomas founded the Singapore Socialist Party (SSP) in April 1954. Marshall was seen as a natural leader in the party, but he refused the presidency. Initial support for the SSP was low, so Thomas decided to form an alliance with the SLP ahead of the election. He met with SLP members V. J. Mendis and C. H. Koh, and the two parties officially formed the Singapore Labour Front (LF) on 21 August 1954. Marshall drafted the LF's constitution, and during that time Tan delivered a speech at a PP meeting detailing its stand against internal self-governance. Tan and the PP's stand irritated Marshall, and when Lim later asked him whether he wanted to lead the LF, Marshall accepted to use it as a platform to contest Tan; Marshall never fully embraced his role as LF's chairman, and neither was he a member of its executive branch.

As the LF's leader, Marshall wanted to elicit the help of MacDonald and the British Labour Party (BLP) to get a British organising secretary to manage the LF, though fellow members did not agree on this. Marshall then decided to travel to London to visit Transport House, the then-BLP headquarters, to learn about party management and election campaigning. By late 1954, Marshall was seen as a political rival to the PP, and on 3 September Governor John Nicoll called on him to advise on the ongoing conscription riot by Chinese students. On 31 October 1954, Marshall published his political thoughts in The Straits Times with a letter titled "I Believe...", highlighting his anti-colonial views and disdain towards the PP's anti-independence views. His letter was seen as one of the first coherent and important political statements, with The Straits Times's Kenneth Hilbourne "[admiring] the spirit and fire of his delivery" in a review. Furthermore, Nicoll previously met with Marshall on 22 October to urge him not to publish it. Earlier that same month, the LF announced that Marshall would contest in Tan's constituency, Cairnhill Constituency, at the election. (Note: The PP had announced their candidates and the constituencies that they would be contesting in earlier in September.)

On 2 November, Marshall made his promised trip to London, boarding MV Asia; he arrived on 13 November. On 16 November, he went to Transport House and met BLP politicians Morgan Phillips, Saul Rose, and John Hatch, along with BLP members of parliament Kenneth Younger and John Parker. Phillips gave him tours of BLP constituencies on weekends, and Marshall spent a total of four months overseas. He returned on 8 February 1955, and during that time the LF had been working on their goals, in which they pledged to remove the Emergency Regulations if they were elected; they also focused on education and merging with Malaya. However, Marshall disagreed with removing the Regulations due to the recent conscription riot, to which Lim explained he added as he believed they would not be elected in the first place.

==== 1955 general election ====
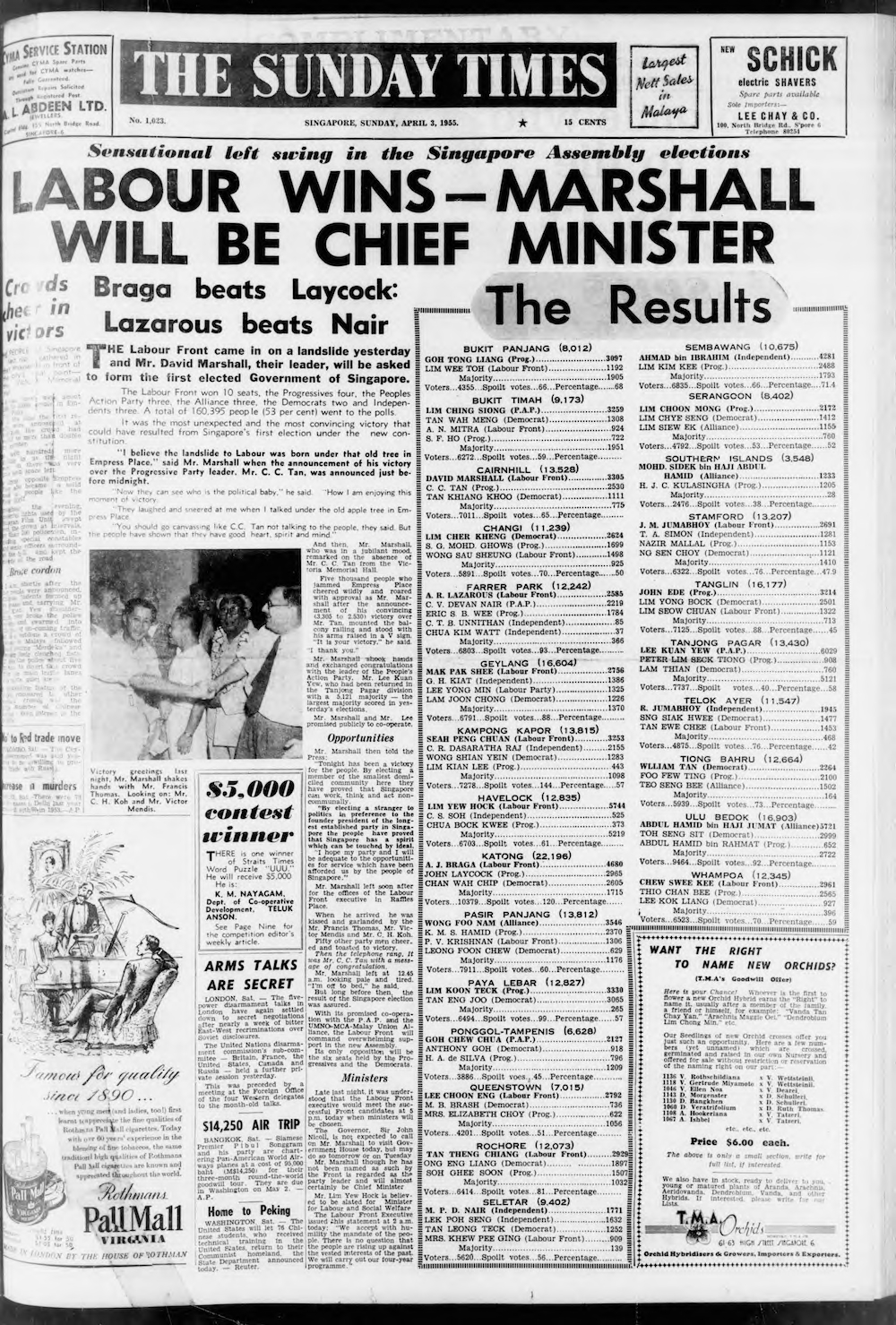
The Sunday Times reporting on the LF's victory on 3 April 1955, with Marshall slated to serve as the chief minister.

The 1955 general election's nomination day was on 28 February, and the LF fielded 17 out of the 79 candidates participating in the election. Marshall chose to specifically contest in PP leader Tan's constituency as he wanted to confront his and the PP's views, which was shown in his speeches where he frequently spoke of self-governance and anti-colonialism. Despite having disagreed earlier with the PAP, the PAP and LF had a mutual understanding of not fielding candidates in each other's constituencies. The PAP themselves stated that, in constituencies with none of their candidates, the vote should go to the LF.

The results of the election were announced on 3 April, with the LF winning the most seats with 10 out of the total 25. The PP performed poorly, with 18 of their 22 candidates being unsuccessful, including Tan. The results surprised Marshall and Lee and Tan congratulated him. He was also, as the LF's leader, named as the first chief minister. In Cairnhill, Marshall was elected with 3,305 votes.

== Chief ministership (1955–1956) ==
=== Cabinet formation ===
Following the LF's minor majority of 10 seats in the Legislative Assembly, (Note: According to the 1954 Rendel Constitution, the Legislative Assembly would consist of 32 members, 25 of whom would be elected by popular vote through elections.) Marshall set up his minority government. He planned to form a coalition with either the Singapore Malay National Organisation (SUMNO)–Malay Union (MU)–Malayan Chinese Association (MCA) alliance or the PAP, eventually settling with the alliance. Marshall met with Governor Nicoll on 4 April, where he explained that even with the SUMNO–MU–MCA alliance, they would not obtain a majority in the Assembly. To increase the LF's representation, Marshall requested Nicoll allow him four LF nominees to the Assembly under the Rendel Constitution, but Nicoll refused and instead appointed two LF executive committee members – Thomas and R. C. H. Lim – and two non-partisans – G. A. P. Sutherland and Ong Piah Teng – to represent European and Chinese commercial interests, respectively. Marshall then formed a coalition with the SUMNO and MCA, though the MU withdrew. Marshall's cabinet required three colonial officials for the roles of chief secretary, financial secretary, and attorney-general, which were given to William Goode, T. M. Hart, and E. J. Davies, (Note: Davies was replaced by Charles Harris Butterfield on 6 September 1955 as he had to serve as Chief Justice of Tanganyika; Butterfield served the rest of Davies' term.) respectively. The rest of Marshall's cabinet was Marshall as the chief minister and commerce and industry minister, Chew Swee Kee as the education minister, Lim Yew Hock as the labour and welfare minister, A. J. Braga as the health minister, Thomas as the communications and works minister, Abdul Hamid Jumat as the local government, lands and housing minister, and J. M. Jumabhoy as the assistant commerce and industry minister. He officially unveiled his cabinet on 7 April at Empress Place, and Nicoll swore them in.

=== Management of strikes and riots ===
In April, Hock Lee bus workers began strikes against the company, following disputes regarding the dismissals of union officials. Marshall addressed the strikers at a rally, stating that the government allowed them the right to strike but they had to exercise this right responsibly. To form a peaceful agreement to end the riots, he met with three representatives of the Singapore Bus Workers' Union (SBWU): secretary-general Fong Swee Suan, legal adviser Lee Kuan Yew, and committee member Lim Chin Siong. As the riots escalated with the involvement of sympathising Chinese students, Marshall met with the SBWU, Hock Lee Amalgamated Bus Company, and the Hock Lee Employees' Union at Assembly House to discuss an end to the riots, announcing later that day that an agreement had been reached between them.

After managing the Hock Lee bus riots, Marshall focused on the Chinese students who were occupying Chinese schools closed during the Hock Lee riots, namely Chung Cheng High School's main and Yishun branch and The Chinese High School. The government ordered the schools' boards to expel the involved students and provide names of those involved in the Hock Lee riots. However, this only fueled the conflict between the students and the authorities; the Chung Cheng High Schools and The Chinese High School prolonged their sit-ins, with the Nanyang Girls' High School joining in. Following strike threats by the Singapore Factory and Shop Workers' Union in support of the students, Marshall appointed an All-Party Committee to investigate the students' issues. Their first meeting advised him to reopen the schools, which he did.

Marshall's management of the Hock Lee riots and the Chinese school sit-ins were met with criticism; letters were sent to newspaper The Straits Times detailing his incompetence as chief minister. In the weeks following the quelling of the Hock Lee riots, many expected the Marshall government to exercise punishments on those involved, but their responses were considered to be small. The governor and chief secretary urged Marshall to send in troops, but he refused as he did not believe in police action. Furthermore, in the Chinese school sit-ins, Marshall was seen to have "meekly obeyed" to the Chinese students, despite calls of action to be taken on them such as deportation. The British wanted to use local military to ease the situation, but eventually agreed that military force would have tarnished the LF government's reputation, and instead helped to restrain the police force from acting against Marshall's plans. Supporting the rioters and Marshall's government, Chinese-language newspapers such as Nanyang Siang Pau and Sin Chew Jit Poh also frowned upon police use.

As more strikes broke out across Singapore, with the main unionists being Devan Nair, Lim Chin Siong, and S. Woodhull, Marshall met with them to discuss and prevent a planned general strike on 13 June. Although the unionists described the meeting as cooperative, on 11 June the government arrested five unionists (Note: The five unionists were Fong Swee Suan, secretary of the SBWU; Ng Hock Guan, vice-president of the SBWU; Chia Phow Chew, Singapore Traction Company and S.T.C. Employee's Union member; Loh Wah Lim, general affairs officer of the Malayan Textile Mill Workers' Union; and Chen Yang Cheng, teacher at The Chinese High School.) under the Emergency Regulations for being involved in the planning of the general strike. This was met with aggression from the unions, but on 13 June, only an eighth of the planned workers went on strike. On 5 July, Marshall held a final meeting with the unions, where they outlined the issues they faced. This meeting was successful, as both Marshall and the unions reached an agreement over the final disputed points. Following the conclusion of the strikes, Nicoll and The Straits Times both stated that the "unconditional surrender" of the Marshall government led to the strikers fulfilling all of their requests. Conversely, both Chinese-language and Malay-language newspapers praised the government's actions.

=== Constitutional crisis ===
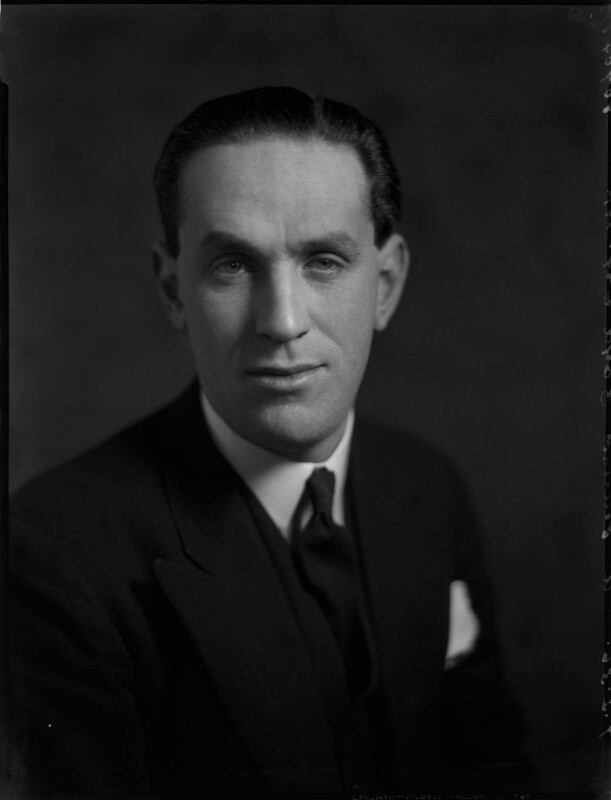
Marshall was asked to hold off on his resignation until the arrival of Alan Lennox-Boyd (pictured).

Following the management of riots, Marshall felt that his government was inadequate and inefficient. On 11 July 1955, Marshall wrote to Governor Robin Black, (Note: Black succeeded Nicoll as governor on 1 July 1955.) stating that the constitution allowed him to create nine new junior ministers, and he wanted to appoint four first and the rest later. In response, Black allowed him only two junior ministers. Marshall called the issue of "grave constitutional importance", as the governor did not acknowledge the opinion of the cabinet and displayed the constitution as allowing the governor to ignore the chief minister's suggestions. After Black's rejection, Marshall threatened to resign. This brought alarm from Singapore and the British, with Black requesting intervention from Secretary of State for the Colonies Alan Lennox-Boyd.

During this period, Marshall held a meeting with the Assembly, where he laid out a three-part motion to the Assembly, detailing that they would end colonial rule, rewrite the constitution to benefit those elected with the view of self-governance, and that the governor should act on the advice of the chief minister. Marshall's motion saw support from twenty-eight members; he subsequently held off on his resignation till Lennox-Boyd arrived. Lennox-Boyd arrived in Singapore on 31 July, briefly leaving to visit London and Borneo, before returning on 15 August. On 18 August, after negotiations, the colonial authorities edited the governor's powers to be in favour of the elected ministers, with the governor required to act in the advice or consultation of the chief minister. On self-governance, Marshall was invited to send a delegation to London to discuss the situation.

=== Party and government issues ===
Throughout their time in office, the LF faced multiple internal conflicts such as financial issues, leadership issues, and conflicting viewpoints. Marshall tended to argue with those going against him and did not hold frequent meetings with his ministers. The LF only introduced more financial and management issues by addressing these problems in its first annual conference held on 29 October 1955. During the conference, executive member C. H. Koh suggested repealing the Preservation of Public Security Ordinance (PPSO) and validating the Malayan Communist Party (MCP), which the government rejected as going against its policies. Furthermore, during the LF's party president election, Marshall did not contest to promote his chief lieutenant Lim Yew Hock to the position instead. However, Lim lost the election to assemblyman A. R. Lazarous, who opposed the current government. This prompted Marshall to investigate Lazarous's election, ultimately discovering that Lazarous had paid other members to vote for him, voiding his ballot; Lim was subsequently elected party president.

These internal issues had since been made public, with Marshall suggesting that the disagreements were not due to policy differences, but instead personal ambitions. Lazarous and Koh had been fighting for positions in Marshall's cabinet since April, which was further amplified by the new junior minister posts introduced after the constitutional crisis. After learning of their rejections, Lazarous and Koh rebelled against Marshall, alongside assemblyman Lee Choon Eng, who was similarly denied a ministerial position. This eventually culminated in Lazarous and Lee leaving LF on 7 November to join the opposition, significantly affecting the LF government's majority as both sides now had an even 16 seats. (Note: However, the LF's government contained only 11 elected members as compared to the opposition's 14; the remaining five were nominated members.) This led to a possibility by the opposition to hold a no-confidence vote, but opposition assemblyman and PAP member Lee Kuan Yew refrained from supporting this.

== 1956 constitutional talks ==
In April 1956, as planned at talks held earlier in December 1955, a Singaporean delegation was received by the British to hold constitutional talks in London. The topics of discussion, which were similarly outlined after the December 1955 talks, included the definition of self-governance; a possible date for the introduction of self-governance; how the Legislative Assembly, external defence, external relations, and public service functioned; and any other possible matters. On 5 April, the Legislative Assembly largely agreed that the delegation was to discuss "the status of an independent territory within the Commonwealth and ceding back external defence and external relations other than trade and commerce to the Government of the United Kingdom".

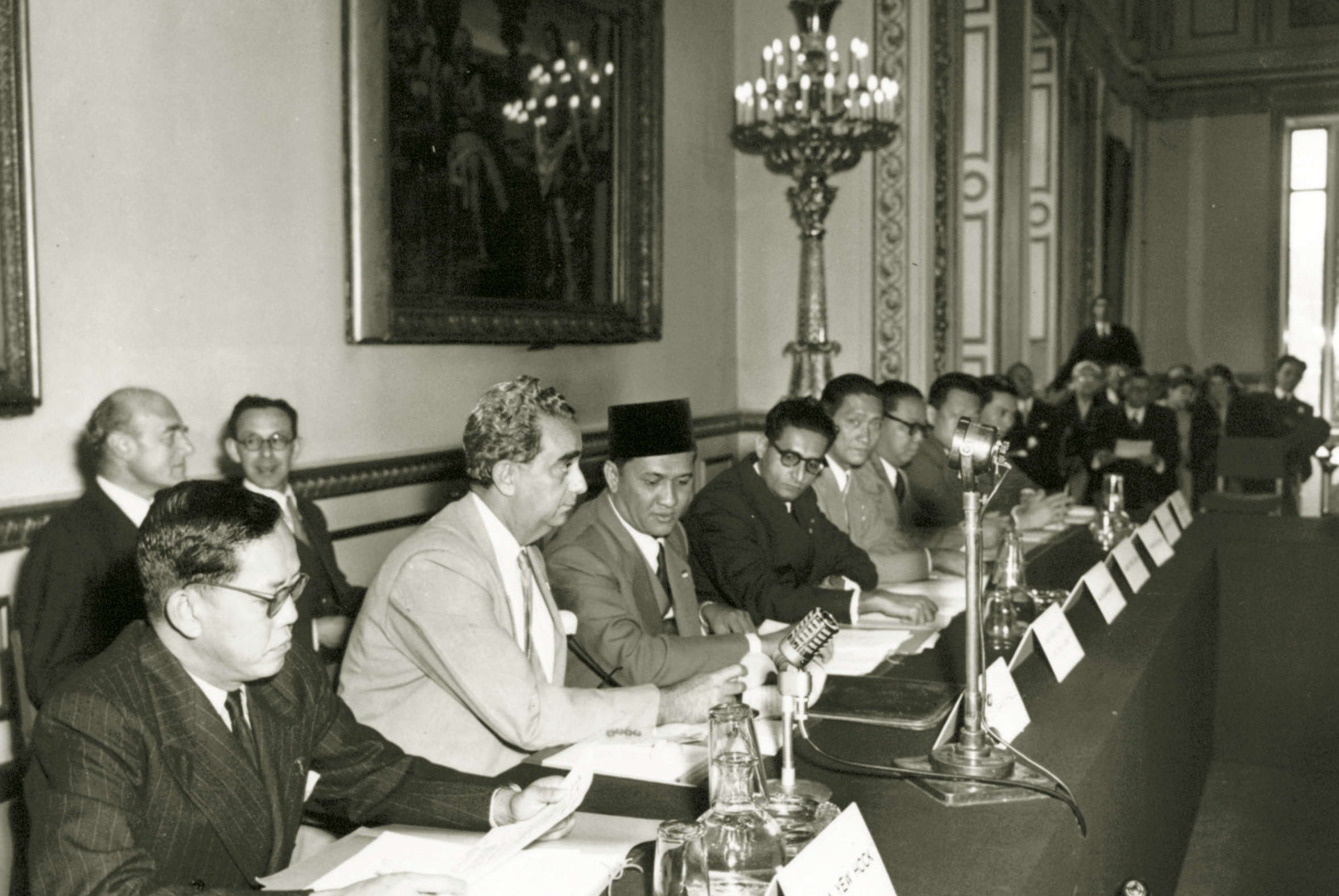
The Singaporean delegation in London, 1956; Marshall is sat second from the left.

On 14 April, the thirteen-member Singaporean delegation headed by Marshall left for London. The constitutional talks opened on 23 April and focused on the delegation's view of independence, formation of a Singaporean citizenship, and management by the Commonwealth Office. The Colonial Secretary responded that the British wanted to maintain control of Singapore's defence, particularly internal security and external affairs, or at least joint control between them. Following a brief adjournment over the weekend, the Singaporean delegation gave their memorandum and a draft of Heads of Agreement, which aimed for Singapore's independence by April 1957. On 25 April, Alan Lennox-Boyd rejected the delegation's proposed April 1957 independence date and instead offered a new constitution which granted a larger degree of self-governance, but still retained British control over Singapore's defence.

Among other concessions from the British, Marshall ultimately refused this counteroffer. Over the next few days, the constitutional talks slowly broke down following internal disagreements in the Singaporean delegation, such as Marshall's refusal to compromise with the British. Dealing with the issue of the British's reserve powers, Marshall suggested that three representatives from Singapore and the United Kingdom be appointed to an Internal Security Council, with a Malayan serving as its chairman. However, Lennox-Boyd insisted on a British high commissioner serving as chairman, leading to the delegation unanimously voting against the British's plan, with only the Liberal-Socialists (LSP) (Note: The Liberal Socialist Party was formed on 5 February 1956 after a merge between the Progressive Party and the Democratic Party.) abstaining. The talks subsequently broke down on 15 May.

=== Aftermath and resignation ===
Later that same day, Marshall attended the House of Commons debate on the constitutional talks and found BLP parliamentarians suggesting a reopening of the talks, inspiring Marshall to meet up with his delegates to plan something similar. On 16 May, Marshall discussed reopening the talks with Lennox-Boyd, who was unopposed but wanted to know the opinion of the delegation. In a meeting on 17 May, despite the opposition parties being uninterested in restarting the talks, Marshall outlined his planned negotiation points if they did, namely that new legislature by the Colonial Office should seek the approval of the House of Commons first; that the Colonial Office should no longer manage Singapore; and that Singapore's head of state would be a local unaffiliated with the British.

However, Marshall faced heavy criticism from his delegation for his decision to reopen the constitutional talks. It was seen as "humiliating" and "degrading", with accusations from the opposition that Marshall only wanted to restart the talks to stay in office. Furthermore, he had announced his decision to reopen talks first to the press, before discussing this with his delegation. This undoubtedly halted any possibility of reopening the talks, as Lennox-Boyd would have only been willing if Marshall received the full support of his delegation. Regardless, Marshall noted that Lennox-Boyd was willing to discuss these new proposals, with the only caveat being the lack of support. He returned to Singapore on 21 May, hoping Lennox-Boyd would support his plan of moving Singapore from the Colonial Office and grant a local head of state, if he received support.

Marshall continued to preach his plan to the Colonial Secretary to reopen the talks, under the assumption that his plan would succeed and, that if it did not by 6 June, Marshall would resign from his post. During this time, his fellow LF members had already been urging him to resign. By 23 May, Lim Yew Hock was viewed as Marshall's successor, receiving support from the LF and Lennox-Boyd. The evening of his return, Marshall contacted Robin Black to inquire whether Lennox-Boyd would receive a new delegation headed by Lim that discussed his originally planned points, if he resigned. On 28 May, Lennox-Boyd replied that he did not want to interfere with Singapore's affairs and, on 30 May, the Colonial Office rejected Marshall's points outright. On 6 June, Marshall requested a censure in the Legislative Assembly regarding his performance at the constitutional talks, but was rejected. On 7 June, he requested a censure again but was similarly refused. Marshall resigned later that day at 5:00 p.m. as chief minister, but remained as a backbencher; Lim succeeded him.

== Post-chief ministership ==
=== Japan and China trip ===
On 19 June 1956, Marshall announced that he had been invited to visit China; this was a part of the Chinese government's initiative to improve relations with Afro-Asian states. He intended to accept and discuss matters with the Chinese government, including the citizenship of Chinese people living in Singapore. At the same time, Yap Pheng Geck of the Trade Advisory Council had planned a trip to China to enhance trade and asked Marshall to head the delegation, which he accepted. The sixty-one members of the delegation were selected by 5 July, and they planned to leave for Japan in late July before heading to China in mid-August. His trip to China was controversial, as China was the most populous communist country at the time, with the Chinese Communist Party having been long-time been supporters of the MCP and in favour of revolutionising Southeast Asia.

Marshall had received messages from Malayan chief minister Tunku Abdul Rahman and American diplomats. Tunku dissuaded him from going as Chinese businessmen in the Federation might then attempt to lead a delegation to China, while the American diplomats offered him a trip to Taiwan instead. Ultimately, a joint delegation with businessmen from the Federation of Malaya was formed. Ahead of the delegation, Marshall left on 20 June to Japan. He spent several weeks in Tokyo, including visiting his POW camp in Nisi-Asibetsu and meeting with trade representatives who wanted to create branches in Singapore and Malaya. He believed that visiting Japan first would help "take the heat off" his China visit. Despite being the leader of the delegation, Marshall often travelled alone first and met up with the delegation at specific stops.

On 14 August, Marshall left Kowloon, Hong Kong, and entered Guangdong, China, where he met Zhao Xingyi, the deputy secretary of the Chinese People's Institute of Foreign Affairs. Zhao hosted Marshall for the next three days as they travelled to Beijing. Marshall reached Beijing on 17 August and met the institute's president, Zhang Xiruo. He stayed in Beijing for two weeks, meeting with many Chinese leaders including Premier Zhou Enlai, Vice Premier Chen Yi, and diplomat Qiao Guanhua. During his meeting with Chen on 20 August, he discussed China's citizenship policy and Chen assured him that overseas Chinese could "be nationals of the countries of their domicile", in accordance with the decision made at the 1955 Bandung Conference. Nevertheless, Marshall was worried that since Singapore was a British colony it could not enter treaties with China.

On 24 August, Marshall asked Chinese authorities to stop the violent activities of the MCP, to which Zhou responded that they renounced relations with foreign communist parties and forbade Chinese nationals from participating in foreign communist activities. As Marshall continued to ask Zhou for a unilateral decision on citizenship, this was eventually met with the creation of a communiqué before he left to return to Singapore on 13 October. During this period, the Chinese had become more evasive of issuing the communiqué and pushed for Marshall's views on colonialism and independence. It was later revealed that they were concerned of chief minister Lim's arrests and banishment of left-wing and pro-communist leaders.

While in China, Marshall was also involved in helping 543 Jews in China emigrate back to Israel. They struggled to leave as China and Israel did not maintain diplomatic relations and, despite Israel issuing them entry visas, either were unable to afford exit permits from China or did not believe that the exit visas were valid as the Soviet Union had not approved them. Marshall first became aware of their plight in a letter on 25 June from R. D. Abraham, the chairman of the Council of the Jewish Community in Shanghai. Marshall further received a message from British parliamentarian Leslie Hale. He officially discussed the issue with Zhou on 9 October, where he urged him to investigate the matter. Shortly after Marshall left China, Abraham wrote that the Soviet government had approved Jewish emigration, and, by March 1957, only two families had yet to leave.

=== Legislative Assembly backbencher ===
The Chinese middle school student riots (pictured) occurred under Lim's government, in protest of his tough measures towards suppressing communist activity.

Upon returning from China, Marshall found Singapore under a different political scene. The new chief minister, Lim Yew Hock, had enacted several measures to curb left-wing and pro-communist activity. This involved the de-registration and closure of the Singapore Chinese Middle School Students' Union, which Marshall had recognised last year. Multiple students staged strikes, sit-ins, and walkouts, culminating in a large clash between students and protesters with the police, which evolved into a riot on 25 October leaving 13 people killed and 123 injured. These developments upset Marshall, but he defended them as helping improve British trust in Singapore. In December 1956, Lim met with Alan Lennox-Boyd to decide a new date for a second round of constitutional talks to be held in 1957. Lim had largely submitted the same proposals as Marshall, only that the proposed Internal Security Council's Malayan representative would be a regular member instead of chairman. (Note: Marshall had originally proposed at the 1955 constitutional talks for an Internal Security Council to be created and in charge of Singapore's internal security, however the talks broke down after they disagreed with the British on whether a British high commissioner or Malayan representative would serve as the council's chairman.)

In the lead up to the talks, Marshall had wanted to be included in its delegation, but Lim informed him on 23 January 1957 that all the ministers and LF members Keng Ban Ee and Wee Kiat Neo opposed his addition. At the 1957 constitutional conference, the Singaporean delegation accepted what were largely the same terms offered to Marshall's delegation that they had previously rejected. Upon their return, Lim tabled a motion in the Legislative Assembly on 26 April to discuss their report, which lasted for four days as Marshall heavily condemned the delegation's actions, facing criticism by its members in return. Ultimately, on 30 April, a majority of the Assembly voted in favour of the motion, with a third delegation planned to travel to London in May 1958.

From the time he resigned as chief minister, Marshall grew further estranged from the LF as he felt marginalised by them; this included his exclusion from the 1957 delegation. At the LF's annual conference in February 1957, Minister Chew Swee Kee ran for party president against Marshall and won after gaining twice as many votes as Marshall. Furthermore, all of Marshall's resolutions at that conference had been defeated, which his biographer Kevin Tan described as a "tremendous blow" to him. On 12 April, he sent a letter to the LF where he criticised their actions at the conference as a "postponement of Merdeka and prolongation of colonial rule" and anticipated that the party whip would be enforced in the matter. He refused to accept such terms and asked them to either remove the whip or accept his resignation, which would be considered to have taken effect from that day. He subsequently received a response on 17 April where they agreed to retain the whip and therefore accepted his resignation.

=== Cairnhill by-election ===
In a speech on 26 April in the Assembly, Marshall announced that he would be willing to contest in a by-election in any constituency to prove his support by the voters. PAP assemblyman Lee Kuan Yew immediately accepted his offer and stated he would resign, with the intention of standing in a by-election for Tanjong Pagar. Marshall received assurance of support from several unions and was himself confident he could win against Lee; in total, nineteen unions expressed support for Marshall. However, the by-election began to evolve into a fight between the left-wing and pro-PAP unions, with Singapore Harbour Board Workers' Union leader Jamit Singh telling Marshall that "if blood flows, that will be good as it must flow" since "there must be an understanding that we are strong". This worried Marshall as he feared a riot and, on 29 April, he resigned from the Assembly and decided to not contest the by-election. Nevertheless, Lee resigned from his seat and stood in Tanjong Pagar, where he was reelected with 68.1% of the vote. Cairnhill was won by Soh Ghee Soon of the LSP.

== Opposition work ==
=== Workers' Party ===
Following his resignation, Marshall remained active in talks about politics and trade unions. His first suggestion that he may return to politics was during a meeting with the Army Civil Service Union (ACSU), where he suggested "[creating] a political party whose membership is exclusively confined to members of the trade unions" and that he would "co-operate with [them] in making this idea a reality." Marshall then founded the Workers' Party (WP) on 9 November 1957, under the principles of democracy, socialism, and independence. WP membership was open to anybody over 18 years old who was unaffiliated with other political parties, with the original plan of limiting it to only trade union members discarded. The WP was supported by the ACSU, but received contention from the LF and the PAP, as they saw the WP as further splitting the disorganised left-wing forces.

The WP made their political debut at the 1957 City Council election in December, where they fielded five candidates and saw four of them elected. Many were surprised at the outcome, as the WP was fairly new and Marshall himself had not stood for election; it was later revealed that the communists had agreed to support the WP. In March 1958, Lee met with the MCP's Fang Chuang Pi and asked him to prove his affiliation with the MCP by getting WP city councillor and vice president Chang Yuen Tong to resign. Fang promised to do so and, by May, Chang had resigned from the City Council and left-wing support for the WP disappeared soon thereafter, as their candidate in the subsequent by-election performed poorly against the PAP's candidate. (Note: The WP nominated Loh Ka Fat, who went against the PAP's Buang Omar Junid, the LF's Lim Ser Puan, and independent G. M. K. Sabai. Buang won with 4,279 votes, while Loh placed third with 304 votes.)

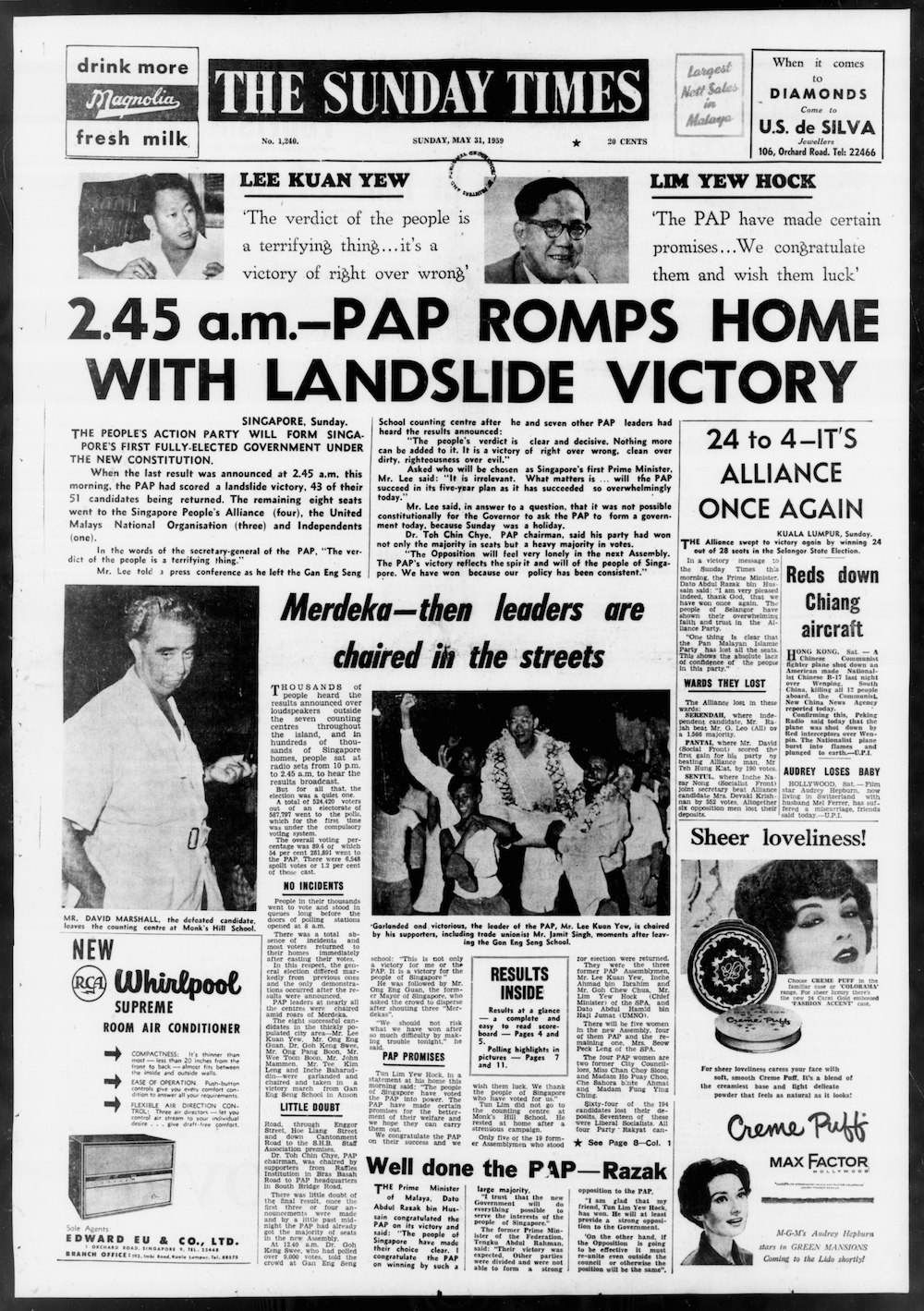
The Straits Times reporting on the PAP's landslide victory at the 1959 general election; Marshall is depicted at middle-left.

Marshall struggled to maintain the WP as five of its executive committee members left, along with WP members being seen canvassing for the PAP. When Lim Yew Hock created the Singapore People's Alliance (SPA) in November 1958, more members defected to join them, including three city councillors and one executive committee member. He responded by calling for the resignation of the city councillors and paying the S$50,000 required of them for breaking the party's terms. At the 1959 general election, the WP fielded three candidates, including Marshall, where he stood for Cairnhill against Lim. In the results, they failed to capture any seats, with Marshall's loss to Lim being the most unexpected, as the SPA had just been involved in the damaging Chew Swee Kee scandal. (Note: Cairnhill was contested by Marshall, Lim, the PAP's Oh Su Chen, and the LSP's Tan Keng Siong. Lim gained 5,275 votes, while Marshall placed second with 2,920 votes.)

=== Assemblyman for Anson ===
In 1961, the PAP was attempting to maintain the left-wing pro-communist elements within their party, including Mayor Ong Eng Guan, who was elected at the 1957 City Council election. Ong began to clash with the PAP, who eventually expelled him. He then challenged them to a by-election in 1961 in his constituency of Hong Lim, where Ong won with 73% of the vote to the PAP's candidate, Jek Yeun Thong. Following the death in office of the PAP's Baharuddin Mohammed Ariff that same year, another by-election was held in Anson, which Marshall decided to contest in. Unbeknownst to him, the communists decided to support Marshall in order to show their control over the voters to the PAP and, in the results, Marshall ended up narrowly winning over the PAP's Mahmud bin Awang. (Note: Marshall was elected with 3,598 votes, while Mahmud gained 3,052 votes. The other three candidates garnered 1,482, 104, and 69 votes, respectively.)

Marshall was sworn into the Legislative Assembly on 20 July 1961. During a motion of confidence in the government, he criticised the PAP's ability to govern following their losses in Hong Lim and Anson, and he called for Lee's resignation; the motion later passed 27–8. Marshall's biographer Kevin Tan writes that most of his comments during his time as assemblyman were "petty" and that he "revelled in picking on the PAP", with Speaker George Oehlers once describing Marshall's argument as "confusion mounting on confusion". Nonetheless, Tan stated that Marshall made "good points", such as his suggestions for an autonomous University of Singapore and higher pay for judges.

==== Merger ====
As a member of the opposition, Marshall was against the PAP's White Paper on merging Singapore and Malaya, specifically that Singaporeans would not automatically be granted Malaysian citizenship. The left-wing Barisan Sosialis (BS) were most adamant against merger, as it would have allowed the government to arrest many pro-communist BS members. BS leader Lee Siew Choh mainly targeted the issue of citizenship, alongside Marshall and Ong; Ong had recently formed the United People's Party (UPP). The three men largely argued that the PAP government did not have the right to accept specific constitutional terms with the Federation without the consultation of the mandate, and they called for new elections to be held to settle the issues with citizenship.

The PAP government rejected the suggestions, but agreed to hold a referendum following a conference of the Commonwealth Parliamentary Association. The opposition then planned to stop the referendum and formed the Council of Joint Action (CJA) in June 1962, consisting of BS, LSP, WP, UPP, and Partai Rakyat. The CJA took the issue of referendum before the United Nations (UN) Committee on Colonialism, where they criticised the terms and lack of choice in the referendum, concluding that it went against the UN's Declaration on the Granting of Independence to Colonial Countries and Peoples. Marshall further wrote to the Ghanian ambassador to the UN, Alex Quaison-Sackey, asking him to bring the Committee on Colonialism's attention to their call. However, Indian diplomat and committee chairman C. S. Jha did not consider the matter to be within their jurisdiction; the committee later voted 10–2 not to take cognisance of the CJA's petition.

Nonetheless, the opposition requested for a hearing before the committee, which was granted. On 24 July, a team comprising Lee Kuan Yew, S. Woodhull, Lim Hock Siew, and Wee Soo Bee went to New York to argue their case to the committee; Marshall appeared before them on 30 July. Ultimately, the committee was not swayed. The referendum went on as scheduled, with the BS campaigning for Singaporeans gaining the right to Malaysian citizenship if they entered under the same terms as Penang and Malacca; Prime Minister Lee later announced that he reached an agreement with Malaysian prime minister Tunku to give all Singaporeans Malaysian citizenship, effectively undoing the BS's argument. Marshall then began to support the White Paper on merger following the decision of a common citizenship. The referendum went on to receive 71% in favour of the government's terms for merger.

==== Resignation from WP ====
Throughout the debate on merger and the referendum, contention between Marshall and his WP colleagues had grown, as the left-wing elements in the party disagreed with Marshall's stance. WP vice president Sum Chong Heng and secretary-general Chua Chin Kiat had then decided to secretly misrepresent Marshall's and the WP's views in the Chinese-language press. Marshall first learnt of this after Culture Minister S. Rajaratnam criticised him for speaking "with two minds", where, according to Rajaratnam, Marshall had described the White Paper as a "false merger" at two WP rallies. Rajaratnam repeated this accusation again during a rally at Fullerton Square and Marshall – working nearby at the Bank of China Building – confronted him and called him a liar, further describing the newspapers as having lied.

Marshall later investigated the matter and discovered that Sum and Chua had deliberately misinterpreted his speeches and views when translating them to Chinese. Marshall called for Sum and Chua's expulsion from the WP executive council in a 4 September 1962 letter, and the two resigned from the party on 15 September. On 20 January 1963, at the WP's annual election to decide its leadership, Marshall was reelected WP chairman, but Chua was also reelected as secretary-general. Marshall then decided to resign from the WP thirty minutes into his chairmanship, stating that they were "deaf to reason and sense" and that the WP was "no longer the appropriate medium for the destination of the concept of democracy".

Marshall continued his term in the Legislative Assembly as an independent until its dissolution in September 1963. At the 1963 general election, he contested for Anson Constituency against five other candidates, where the PAP's P. Govindaswamy defeated him and garnered 3,957 votes. Marshall placed fourth with 416 votes, less than 5% of the vote, causing him to lose his deposit. He retired from politics following this defeat, but had plans to reenter politics over the following years, though none of them came to fruition.

== Post-political career ==
Marshall returned to law after his resignation as chief minister, working at Battenberg & Talma in November 1956. However, by mid-1957, he had decided to start his own practice and founded David Marshall & Co. at the Bank of China Building. In 1959, the firm was renamed to Marshall & Smith following a partnership with Leo Anthony Joseph Smith, but he left by 1960. He soon afterward partnered with Chung Kok Soon, who later left in 1962 to start his own practice. Marshall continued with the firm from 1962 until his retirement in 1978 to serve as an ambassador; Amarjeet Singh and Mohideen P. H. Rubin subsequently took over the firm, renaming it to Amarjeet Rubin & Partners.

In April 1970, Judge Tan Ah Tah swore Marshall into the Presidential Council, which also included ministers Lee Kuan Yew, Goh Keng Swee, and S. Rajaratnam, and former political figures such as C. C. Tan and Francis Thomas. He was a permanent member of the council, whose purpose was to safeguard minority rights and advise the government on certain issues. Marshall had early on considered the council to be a "hypocritical PAP façade" and, five months later, resigned after Constitution (Amendment No. 2) Act 1970 was passed, which reduced the council's already limited powers further.

=== Law suspension ===
In 1971, Marshall was involved in the Lee Mau Seng case; Lee Mau Seng, Shamsuddin Tung Tao Chang, and Ly Singko were arrested under the Internal Security Act for "glamourising communism" in the Chinese-language newspaper Nanyang Siang Pau. The Law Society of Singapore then charged Marshall of having performed "grossly improper conduct" during the case under section 84 of the Legal Profession Act. The case had attracted much attention locally and internationally, prompting the chief justice and attorney-general to ask Marshall not to publish the accused's affidavits publicly in the press, to which Marshall agreed and privately sent the affidavits to various individuals via letter, including Derek Round of the International Press Institute under the promise that Round would not publish them in the press before the hearing on 7 June. Round later gave copies of the affidavits to representatives of United Press, Associated Press, and Reuters on 6 June.

The attorney-general stated that Marshall had breached the undertaking between them, but Marshall argued that he had neither given an undertaking and, if the undertaking was considered legally binding, only applied to the publication of the affidavits before the date of the hearings. Regardless, the Disciplinary Committee found him guilty of grossly improper conduct, and a show cause hearing was held before the High Court in October 1972. The panel upheld the Disciplinary Committee's decision on 7 October and Marshall was suspended from practicing law for six months. This decision was highly controversial and criticised within the legal community, as the court had not clarified what totalled "grossly improper conduct", only that there was "abundant evidence". Marshall suffered from depression in the following period.

=== Diplomatic career ===
External image
- Marshall during a general debate of the Third Committee, 1968 via the UN

In 1968, Foreign Minister Rajaratnam invited Marshall to join a Singaporean delegation travelling to the 23rd session of the UN General Assembly. Marshall, though surprised, accepted and joined Member of Parliament (MP) Ng Kah Ting and diplomats Abdul Rahim Ishak, Harry Chan Keng Howe, and Abdul Aziz bin Mahmood on their trip to New York. The delegation met with the Singaporean permanent representative to the UN, Tommy Koh, who had been Marshall's pupil and assistant from 1961 to 1962. Koh decided to appoint Marshall to the Third Committee as it focused on social, humanitarian, and cultural issues, which he believed Marshall was interested in. He succeeded in his role, and Koh suggested he return for the 24th session, though nothing came of this.

On 8 May 1978, Marshall met with Minister E. W. Barker to ask about a possible ambassadorship, where Barker stated that Rajaratnam supported the idea and would inquire with Prime Minister Lee. Later that month, Lee appointed Marshall as the first Singaporean ambassador to France, and he arrived in Paris on 13 October. During his time as the ambassador to France, Marshall was known for his "friendly, gregarious nature, his colourful and flamboyant personality, and his imposing presence", which helped him create good relationships with French officials. He further received praise from diplomats S. Dhanabalan and S. R. Nathan for his conduct.

Despite his disagreements with the PAP government and Prime Minister Lee, Marshall defended the country's interests abroad throughout his time as ambassador. He served concurrently as the ambassador to Spain and Portugal from 1981, and as the ambassador to Switzerland from 1991, holding all posts until his retirement. He retired on 31 July 1993 – owing to his worsening eyesight and age – after 15 years in diplomacy. In October 1993, Marshall joined Drew & Napier.

== Personal life and death ==
External image
- Marriage ceremony of Marshall and Gray, 1961 via The Straits Times

Marshall married Jean Mary Gray on 5 April 1961. Gray was born on 13 April 1926 in Kent, South East England, and studied at the London School of Economics. She was a medical social worker with the London Brompton Hospital, before travelling to Pahang, Malaya, in 1953 as a field officer for the Red Cross. In 1955, she worked as a medical social worker at the Selangor Medical Department before becoming a lecturer at the University of Malaya in Singapore's Department of Social Work. She met Marshall in 1959, and they became engaged in February 1961. Together, they had four children: Ruth, Sara, Joanna, and Jonathan. Jean died on 29 March 2021, aged 94.

On 14 July 1995, Marshall fractured his spine after a fall in his home. He was admitted to the Singapore General Hospital (SGH), where it took an estimated six to eight weeks to heal. Marshall was diagnosed with lung cancer in August that year and began treatments at SGH. In December, The Straits Times reported that he was "gravely ill". According to Tan, Marshall knew he did not have long to live, given his habit of smoking and old age. He died from lung cancer in his home at 7:30 am (Singapore Standard Time) on 12 December 1995, aged 87. He was buried at the Choa Chu Kang Jewish Cemetery on 13 December, with a memorial service held at the Maghain Aboth Synagogue. He received tributes from Prime Minister Goh Chok Tong, former president Wee Kim Wee, former minister S. Rajaratnam, the ministers Lim Hng Kiang and S. Jayakumar, ambassador Tommy Koh, and lawyer Harry Elias.

=== Views ===
As a lawyer, Marshall frequently spoke of human rights, equality, and justice. During a 1969 speech titled "The Rule of Law", Marshall considered the British's best contribution to civilisation to be the rule of law; he also pointed out two instances of breaching the rule of law in Singapore to be the PPSO and the Criminal Law (Temporary Provisions) Ordinance, as both held the power to detain individuals without trial. Kevin Tan wrote that Marshall's view of the rule of law went further than the typical conception of the term – popularised by legal scholar A. V. Dicey – and followed an approach more similar to scholar Wolfgang Friedmann, stating that democratic societies should hold the rule of law "on the three foundations of equality, liberty, and ultimate control of government by the people".

Tan further described Marshall as "probably Singapore's best known opponent of the death penalty". He considered it to be unhelpful in reducing crime, arguing that the certainty of being apprehended and convicted actually deterred crime. While Marshall consistently praised Prime Minister Lee and the PAP government for developing Singapore along with its economic prosperity, he also condemned the government for limiting freedom of speech and public freedoms. He stated that "we should keep in mind the horrors of [China's] Cultural Revolution, brought about by the cult of subservience to authority and primacy of society over the individual before we point the accusing finger at those who believe that respect for the individual is the basis of human civilisation". He criticised the caning of Michael Fay as "grossly excessive" , and The New York Times described him as an "opponent of Singapore authoritarianism".

== Honours ==
Marshall was made an honorary member of the Law Society in 1978. In 1987, the National University of Singapore (NUS) gave him an honorary Doctor of Laws degree. In 1992, he was made an honorary member and fellow for life of the Singapore Academy of Law alongside Chief Justice Wee Chong Jin.

=== National ===
- Pingat Jasa Gemilang (1990)

=== Foreign ===
- Pahang
  - Dato Kurnia Johan Pahlawan (1965) (Note: It translates literally to "Honourable Elder Champion Warrior"; the title was specifically created and bestowed upon him by the Sultan of Pahang Abu Bakar, in recognition of his legal services.)
- France
  - Knight of the Legion of Honour (1978)

== Legacy ==
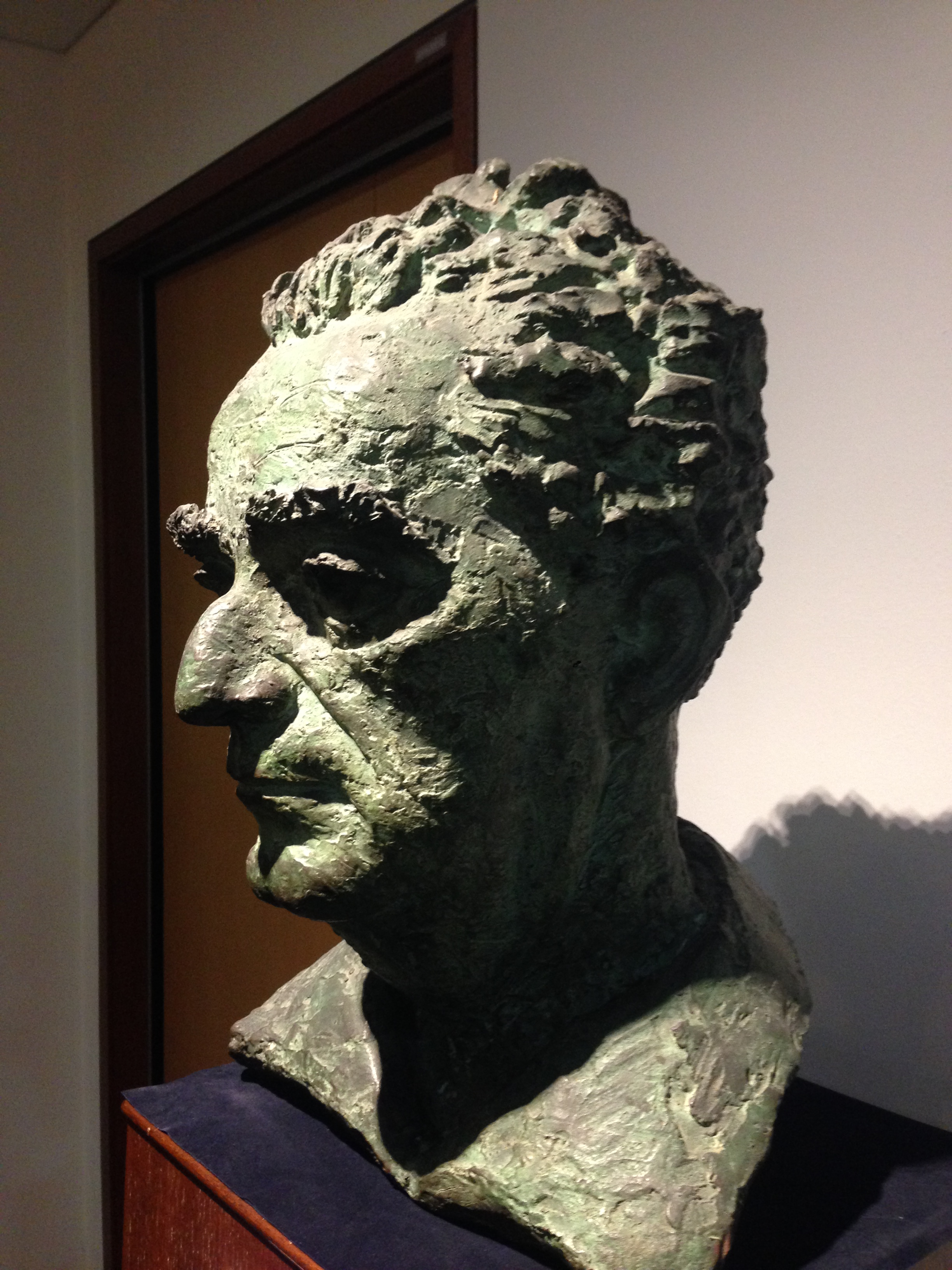
Peter Lambda's bust of Marshall, created in 1956, at the School of Law, Singapore Management University

Marshall's smoking pipes (pictured in 2026) on display at the National Museum of Singapore

Marshall is remembered for his progress towards independence, his speeches, and legal work, along with his tenure as chief minister where he started many political initiatives on issues such as education and multilingualism. Some publications have described him as a founding father of Singapore. In her 1984 biography, his biographer Chan Heng Chee described him as a "shooting star" who "filled the sky with brilliance and disappeared".

According to the Malayan Law Journal, Marshall was involved in at least 128 cases over his 41 year-long law career. Of those cases, fifteen are cited in Criminal Law in Singapore and Malaysia: Text and Materials (1989), the leading casebook on Singapore's criminal law. Furthermore, two preventive detention cases which he appeared in – namely Karm Singh v. Menteri Hal Ehwal Dalam Negeri v. Malaysia and Lee Mau Seng v. Minister for Home Affairs, Singapore & Another – later became landmark decisions. His skill as a lawyer was reportedly one of the factors that led Prime Minister Lee to abolish trials by jury.

In 1995, the David Marshall Professorship in Law was set up after securing S$1.5 million (1995) (US$1.06 million); it was the first named and endowed chair of the NUS's Faculty of Law. In 2007, the Singapore Management University's School of Law (SMU Law) introduced the David Marshall Prize for Top Student in Criminal Law, which was funded by members of the Jewish community. In 2017, the Yale–NUS College introduced the David Marshall Scholarship for double degree law students. The School of the Arts, Singapore (SOTA) has the David Marshall Scholarship, which is awarded to students who participate in community events and show leadership skills.

Jean Marshall donated a number of her husband's personal belongings to the National Museum of Singapore, including his campaign cards and smoking pipes. Owing to a love of art, Marshall commissioned and gifted the Botanic Gardens with three bronze statues by British sculptor Sydney Harpley: Girl on a Swing (1984), Girl on a Bicycle (1987), and Lady on A Hammock (1989). Through these sculptures, he wanted to inspire Singaporeans to "[smile and] feel the excitement and joy of living", according to Jean. In 2011, the Marshall estate donated a bust of Marshall created by Hungarian sculptor Peter Lambda in 1956 to the SMU Law's David Marshall Moot Court. Jean expressed the hope that the tribute would inspire law students to pursue the passion, diligence, courage, and integrity that had distinguished Marshall's achievements.

== See also ==
- History of the Jews in Singapore

Political offices
New office	Chief Minister of Singapore; 1955–1956	Succeeded by Lim Yew Hock
Parliament of Singapore
New constituency	Member of the Legislative Assembly for Cairnhill; 1955–1957	Succeeded by Soh Ghee Soon
Preceded by Mohamed Ariff bin Baharuddin	Member of the Legislative Assembly for Anson; 1961–1963	Succeeded by Perumal Govindaswamy
