= Felice Leon-Soh =

Singapore politician (1922 to 1983)

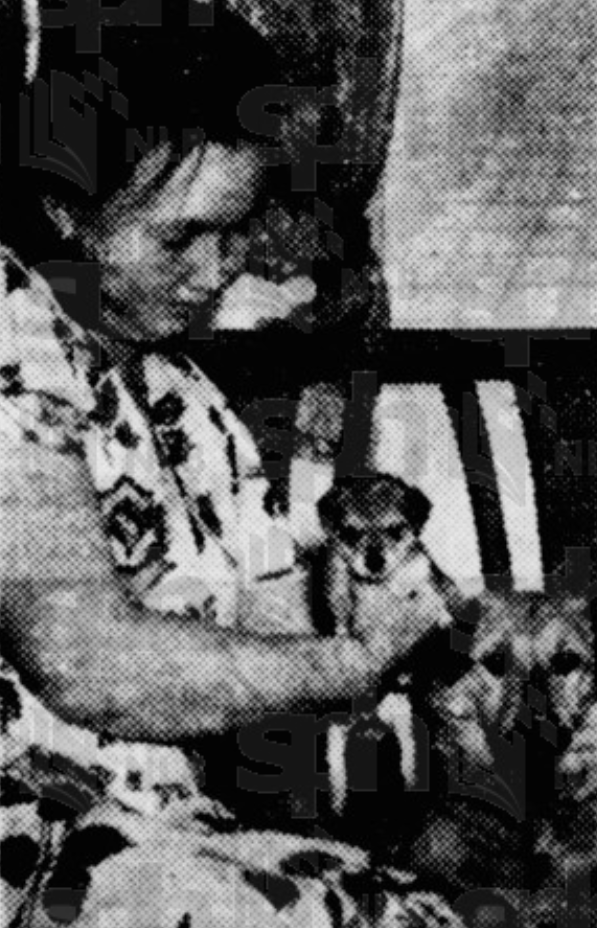
Leon-Soh in 1953

Felice Leon-Soh (30 November 1922 – 22 April 1983) was a politician and social worker in Singapore. Initially a school principal, she was elected a member of the City Council of Singapore representing Mountbatten as a member of the Liberal Socialist Party (LSP) in 1957. She left the party at the start of 1959 due to a dispute. She then continued in the council as an independent for a few months before resigning to contest in the 1959 Singaporean general election as the president of the Katong United Residents' Association (KURA).

She was elected the president of the Singapore Congress (SC) party in 1960. When the party merged with the LSP in 1961, she became the latter's secretary-general. As a member of the LSP, she was opposed to the People's Action Party's (PAP) plans for merging Singapore with the Federation of Malaya. She again stood as a candidate in the 1963 Singaporean general election as an independent (the LSP had dissolved in that year).

== Early life and education ==
Leon-Soh was the daughter of Alexander Warton Drage, a medical practitioner. Born in Singapore, she studied at the Convent of the Holy Infant Jesus. She remained in Singapore during the Japanese Occupation and eventually wrote a manuscript recounting her wartime experiences.

== Career ==
Leon-Soh was the "mistress of method" at the Teluk Paku School. She advocated for the founding of the Canine Welfare Association, of which she was a sponsor. The organisation was formed by August of that year and she was elected its president, with her husband serving on its committee. The association's home for stray dogs was completed in May 1954, with the association by then having nearly 400 members. In June 1955, Leon-Soh formed the Married Women's Union, of which she was also the president. She proposed legalising prostitution on a "very limited scale" as she believed that it would only continue to "grow behind closed doors" if illegal. In her proposal, all prostitutes would be registered, young women would be prevented from engaging in such work and married men with wives in Singapore would be barred from entering brothels. Should a man violate this, his wife would be able to take legal action against him by herself or the union. She was the acting principal of the Teluk Paku School by then. By November, she had retired as a school principal. She had been with the school for 15 years by then. In February 1956, she declared the Married Women's Union a "flop".

=== Political career ===
==== City Council of Singapore (1956–1959) ====
Leon-Soh was elected the secretary of the women's section of the Liberal Socialist Party in June. She believed that men were "too-tied up" with the "bigger" issues to care for women's and children's welfare, raising trade unions as an example of such an issue. In 1957, Leon-Soh was selected the party's candidate for the Mountbatten ward in the upcoming City Council election. At an election rally, she claimed to have resigned as principal as she had been forced by the Ministry of Education to apologise to a "rich man's son" as a result of her reporting him for bullying, blaming the incident on the Labour Front. She was the party's only female candidate. Leon-Soh won the election and was among three women elected to the council, the other two being Hoe Puay Choo and Chan Choy Siong, both of the People's Action Party. She also introduced some new members to the Singapore Council of Women. However, in October 1956, she sent a letter to the City Secretary defending City Council information bureau director Gary Wang against a motion to dismiss him made by the party. In December, Leon-Soh voted to re-elected Ong Eng Guan of the PAP as mayor, a move which "caused a storm in the party". She was "expelled" from the party in January of the following year after she was found guilty of "not owing allegiance to the organization" and continued with the council as an independent. She had already resigned along with all of the members of the party's Mountbatten division but one. She then founded the Katong United Residents' Association, initially "purely a social association" that "reserved the right to participate in politics", with them and served as its president. Leon-Soh also served as the vice-chairman of the city council's assessment committee.

To her support, the Mountbatten branch of LSP broke away from its parent party to form the Katong United Residents' Association (KURA). KURA then contested the Joo Chiat and Mountbatten wards in the 1959 general election, but with mediocre results.

Leon-Soh was also a trustee of the Singapore Improvement Trust. However, she resigned in March after the committee had refused to "see a relative of a tenant on the question of arrears of rent." She described the committee's actions as "an insult to a member of Singapore's poorer classes." She then sent a letter to then-Governor of Singapore William Goode, asking him to set up a commission of inquiry into the trust's workings. She also stated that she was prepared to come forward with "facts and evidence of queer cases." In March, she submitted a proposal to the health committee for rubbish collectors to be provided with several sets of uniforms and a shower with "disinfected water and soap" at the end of the work day. She then announced that she would be standing as a candidate for Mountbatten in the 1959 Singaporean general election and was thus forced to resign from the city council. She was running as a member of the KURA. However, her letter was required by law to be forwarded to the mayor after she had sent it to the Chief Administrative Officer and only then would her resignation be considered valid. However, the position was then vacant as the previous mayor, Ong, had resigned just last week along with all 13 councillors of the PAP. Chief Administrative Officer P. C. Marcus called a special meeting in April to elect a new mayor while Leon-Soh maintained that she had already resigned, choosing not to attend. However, with Leon-Soh's resignation, there were only 17 candidates left, the bare minimum required for the election of a mayor. With more councillors expected to resign before nomination day, it was decided that she would be allowed to resign.

==== 1959 general election ====
Leon-Soh stated in May that politics was a "dirty and filthy game" and that the reason that KURA had become political was that there was no other way to enter the city council and the Legislative Assembly of Singapore. She pledged to aid workers but stated that she would not "take the money from the rich" to "help the poor" as the rich would "suffer" and that the party aimed to "help both and try to bring them together." Her opponents in the election were Tay Kum Sun of the PAP, Seow Peck Leng of the Singapore People's Alliance, who was also a "social leader" and a former headmistress, architect Wong Foo Nam of the Malaysian Chinese Association and Wee Soo Bee of the LSP. Leon-Soh and Seow were two of a total of nine female candidates in the election. She stated: "To me politics is a sacred mission. Women must come forward with clear and honest intentions."

In June, it was decided that KURA would be renamed the Singapore United Asiatic Residents' Association (SUARA) and that citizens of Singapore outside of Katong were now eligible for membership. However, she came in fourth with 1,354 votes, behind Seow, Tay and Wong. A year later, the political arm of KURA was reformed as the Singapore Congress (SC).

==== Singapore Congress ====
Singapore Congress
- Chinese name: 新加坡国民大会党
- Malay name: Kongres Singapura
- Founder: Felice Leon-Soh
- Founded: 9 May 1960; 66 years ago
- Dissolved: 29 January 1962; 64 years ago
- Merged into: Liberal Socialist Party

The Singapore Congress (SC) (Chinese: 新加坡国民大会党) was a defunct political party in Singapore that operated from 9 May 1960 to 29 January 1962. At the inaugural conference of the newly-formed party, which was held at the Victoria Memorial Hall in July 1960 and attended by nearly 1,000 delegates of from its 51 branches, Leon-Soh was elected the party's president. In its mission statement, SC wanted to campaign for multi-lingual education, more trade schools, inter-religious missionary activities, hospitals and more dispensaries for the poor, more public incorporation, and share co-ownership by workers.

At a party rally for the 1961 Singaporean by-elections, she stated that while Merdeka was the "ultimate goal", Singapore was not yet ready for it and that it was unwise to "kick the British out" then as it would leave Singapore in "misery and chaos" and that the British should stay to "help us carry our burden." She later stated that if the British were to leave Singapore then, they would be "acting in their own interests" and not in that of Singapore. She had intended to stand as a candidate for the Hong Lim Constituency in the by-elections but was disqualified as her husband's name was listed on the 1959 electoral register for Mountbatten instead of hers. On 11 March, she held a mock traditional Chinese funeral at her home where she 'mourned' the "death of democracy in the state of Singapore." An image of a coffin laid over a map of Singapore "struck by lightning" was placed on the 'altar'. Joss sticks and joss papers, as well as candy, were placed on the 'altar', which was located behind a wreath and more joss papers. As journalists were present, her followers turned away from her for "fear of recognition and repercussions."

In April, Lee Kuan Yew made a speech in which he claimed that an alliance between Leon-Soh and Ong Eng Guan, who had recently been expelled from the PAP and was contesting for the Hong Lim seat as an independent, was a possibility. Leon-Soh responded by rejecting the accusation and challenging him to a debate on the matter, threatening the "exposure of the naked truth" of her disqualification. The following month, a petition was filed seeking the voiding of the Hong Lim by-election, which Ong had won, on the basis that she had been "improperly deprived of her democratic right" to contest in the election. However, the petition was rejected in September, with the judge upheld that her husband's name in place of her's on the register meant that she could not prove to have been a candidate and that she had ample time to rectify the error as the register had been gazetted in December 1959 while the nomination day for the by-election was in March 1961. In December, she stated women politicians were "an imperative must" and the women should enter politics "make it clean". Leon-Soh later claimed that she had been disqualified as a "political device to prevent splitting of votes."

SC then contested Anson in a five-corner fight on 15 July without success; it was won by David Marshall of the Workers' Party, who received the backing of PAP's left-wing members.

Election	Leader	Constituency contested	Votes	%	Seats				Result
Election	Leader	Constituency contested	Votes	%	Contested		Total	+/–	Result
Election	Leader	Constituency contested	Votes	%	Won	Lost	Total	+/–	Result
1961	Felice Leon-Soh	Anson	69	0.84%	0	1	0 / 2	Steady	Lost

==== Merger and the 1963 general election (1962–1963) ====
In January 1962, the Singapore Congress merged into the Liberal-Socialist Party, then headed by Wee Soo Bee, to "propagate liberal socialism under one banner." Leon-Soh was elected the secretary-general of the LSP in February. She met with Tunku Abdul Rahman in Kuala Lumpur in September in an attempt to delay the merger of Singapore with the Federation of Malaya. However, he told her that he was "not very interested" in politics and was instead "more concerned with looking after the welfare and the wellbeing of the people and the nation." Leon-Soh became the convenor of the Council of Joint Action, composed of five political parties all opposed to the merger of Singapore with the federation, which had been established in June. In August, she argued against holding a referendum, as she claimed that people "would be denied the democratic right to dissent" and that they were already "forced" to support a merger, thus making a referendum a waste of public funds. In the same meeting, it was announced that the LSP would be withdrawing from the council, with Leon-Soh stating that it had served its purpose "by word, deed and document."

In January 1963, Leon-Soh announced that the LSP would be organising an anti-Communist education campaign to "explain to the people why Communism is bad." She claimed that this was because "merely telling" people why Communism was "bad" was insufficient. After the proposal received the "blessing" of Tengku Abdul Rahman, she rejected the accusation that the proposal was the party's attempt at "trying to get into the good books of the Tengku because of the impending formation of Malaysia", and instead claimed that the party had sought the Tengku's blessing as he had "stated his anti-Communist stand in a clear cut manner", which she believed was unlike the leaders of Singapore, who she claimed "confuse the people." Leon-Soh organised talks in Tokyo between Indonesian President Sukarno and the Tengku in May 1963 on Indonesia's confrontation policies against Malaya. Khir Johari then praised her as a "stateswoman" who had "contributed to world peace." In September, she announced that the LSP would be dissolved and that she would be standing as a candidate for Mountbatten in the 1963 Singaporean general election as an independent. The Straits Times then described her as "one of Singapore's most colourful political personalities." Her opponents were Ng Yeow Chong of the PAP, Fung Yin Ching of the Barisan Sosialis and Lee Kim Chuan of the Singapore Alliance Party. She came in last, receiving only 1,053 of 15,827 total votes cast.

=== Post-political career ===
After retiring from her "short but active" career in politics, she "faded out of the public eye" and became a businesswoman. Following the Singapore government's donation of $50,000 to the Malaysian National Disaster Relief Fund for the 1967 Malaysia floods, Leon-Soh sent a letter to Lee Kuan Yew in January sending him $100 to start a "Singapore — Malaysia Help-Thy-Neighbour" fund in aid of the flood victims. In July 1971, she wrote and distributed a pamphlet defending Lee for taking action against the Singapore Herald, the Eastern Sun and the Nanyang Siang Pau. Leon-Soh claimed in 1983 to have originally split from the LSP as she had come to agree with the PAP's policies and that she greatly respected Lee. Tan Chung Lee of the New Nation then reported that she "appears to be a rather eccentric woman, according to many who know her." As a social worker, she also served on the committees of the Singapore Anti-Tuberculosis Association and the Society for the Blind.

== Personal life and death ==
Leon-Soh lived on Boscombe Road. She married Leon-Soh Yew Leong, an executive member of the SC and then the LSP and the director and secretary of a mining company. He died of a heart attack at the age of 52 on 3 December 1969. She was a "well-known animal lover". In 1950, a woman of Ipoh and her daughter showed up at Leon-Soh's doorstep "ragged, penniless and starving." She provided them with shelter, food and clothing and employed the mother as a servant as her previous servant had recently left. Leon-Soh stated in 1951 that the woman had proven to be a "most useful person" after training. The woman left with her daughter a year later. In August 1955, she made an offer to take custody of a 6-year-old boy whose father, an opium smoker, had been arrested. He was placed in the custody of his father's friend, who was in an opium care centre. However, the friend and his wife rejected the offer, stating that they "loved the boy too much to part with him."

Leon-Soh suffered from diabetes and liver failure in her later years. She died of a heart attack at the Gleneagles Hospital on 22 April 1983.
