= 1961 Singaporean by-elections =

- 29 April 1961 (Hong Lim); 15 July 1961 (Anson)

2 seats to the Legislative Assembly of Singapore
- Registered: 21,708
- Turnout: 20,384 (93.90%) ▲4.42%
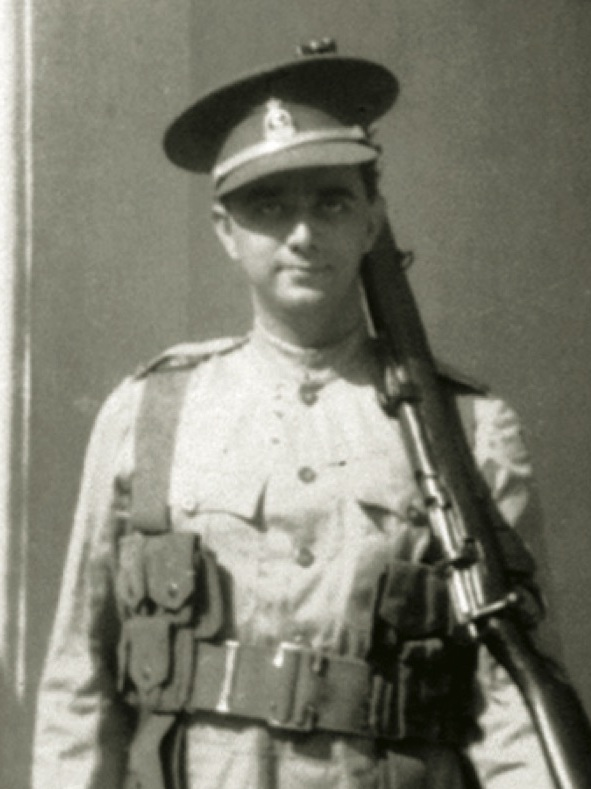

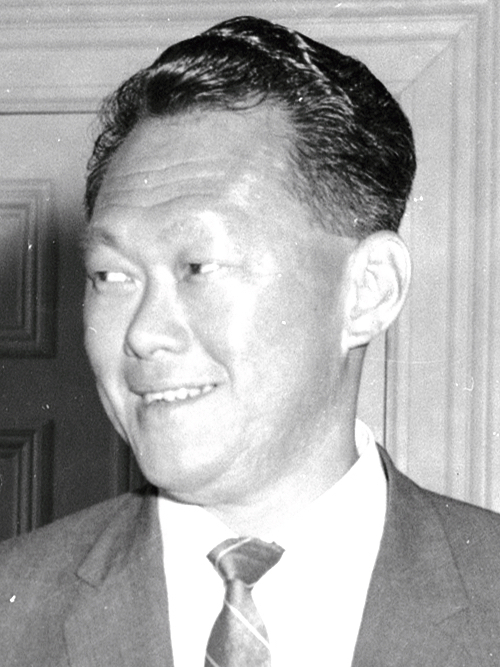

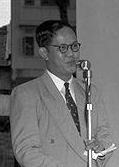

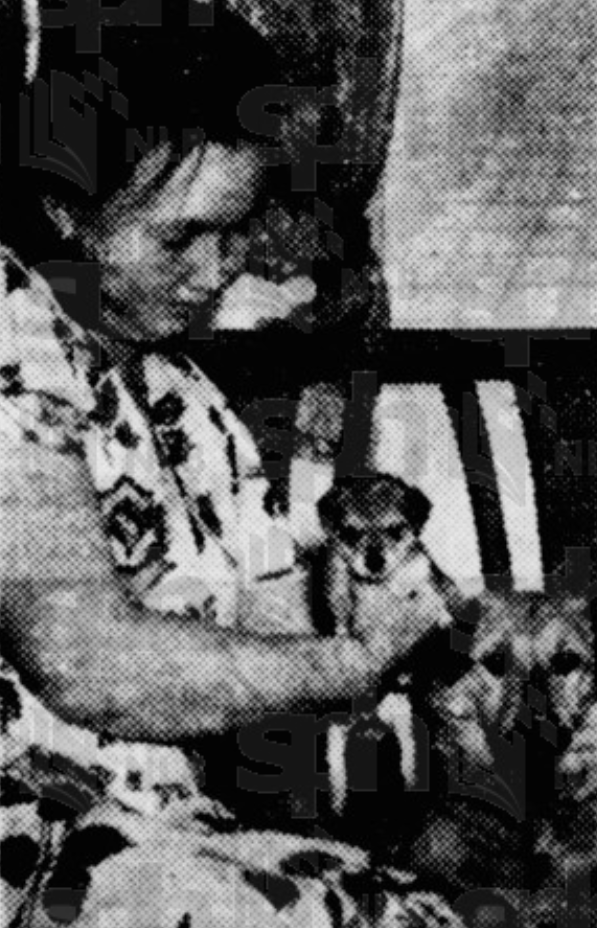
	Majority party	Minority party	Third party
Leader	Ong Eng Guan	David Marshall	Lee Kuan Yew
Party	Independent	WP	PAP
Seats won	1	1	0
Seat change	▲1	▲1	▼2
Popular vote	7,747	3,598	5,872
Percentage	41.05%	19.07%	31.11%
Swing	▲41.05%	▲19.07%	▼38.99%
	Fourth party	Fifth party	Sixth party
Leader	Lim Yew Hock	Tan Ek Khoo	Felice Leon-Soh
Party	SA	LSP	SC
Seats won	0	0	0
Seat change	Steady	Steady	Steady
Popular vote	1,482	104	69
Percentage	7.85%	0.55%	0.37%
Swing	▼4.48%	▼9.90%	▲0.37%
Assemblymen before election
- Ong Eng Guan
- Baharuddin Mohamed Ariff
PAP
Elected Assemblymen
- Ong Eng Guan
- David Marshall
- Independent
- WP

Two by-elections were held in 1961. The first by-election, for Hong Lim Constituency, was held on 29 April with the nomination day held on 11 March, while the second by-election, for Anson, was held on 15 July with the nomination day held on 10 June.

== Background ==
In June 1960, Ong Eng Guan submitted 16 resolutions to the People's Action Party's (PAP) Central Executive Committee criticising the leadership, open disputes with his Cabinet colleagues, including over the abolishment of the City Council, resulting in his dismissal from the cabinet. He was later expelled from the party, alongside S. V. Lingam and Ng Teng Kian on 27 July.

On 29 December 1960, Ong resigned from the Legislative Assembly, compelling the government to call a by-election. Ong contested as an independent candidate and won, defeating PAP's Jek Yeun Thong despite the party's leadership actively campaigning for Jek. Ong's victory highlighted his enduring popularity.

On 20 April, nine days prior to the first by-election polling, another seat was vacated following the death of Anson's MP Baharuddin Mohammed Ariff. Workers' Party founder David Marshall, who was also a former Labour Front chief minister, would contest the seat.

== Electoral results ==
By-election of 29 April 1961: Hong Lim
Party	Candidate	Votes	%	±%
Independent	Ong Eng Guan	7,747	73.31	
PAP	Jek Yeun Thong	2,820	26.69	▼50.33
Majority		4,927	46.62	▼20.01
Turnout		10,818	90.97	▼0.64
Independent gain from PAP		Swing	N/A	

By-election of 15 July 1961: Anson
Party	Candidate	Votes	%	±%
WP	David Marshall	3,598	43.32	N/A
PAP	Mahmud bin Awang	3,052	36.75	▼24.00
SA	Chee Phui Hung	1,482	17.84	▼4.20
LSP	Mohammed Ismail bin Haji Mohammed Hussain	104	1.25	▼13.22
Singapore Congress	Mohammed Ibrahim bin Mohd Kassim	69	0.84	N/A
Majority		546	6.57	▼32.1
Total valid votes		8,305	86.82	▼12.00
Rejected ballots		1,261	13.18	▲12.00
Turnout		9,566	97.45	▲10.68
Registered electors		9,816		▼1.06
WP gain from PAP				

== Aftermath ==
Ong's landslide victory was attributed to his popularity with Hong Lim voters and his oratory skills. Incidentally, the PAP candidate Jek Yeun Thong was Ong's secretary during his time as Mayor in the City Council. Ong would form the United People's Party along with the two members on 18 June and would remain in his seat until his retirement in July 1965. However, following disagreements from the party, Lingam was later reinstated to PAP on 8 July 1962.

Marshall's victory marked the first WP presence in the legislature and the return to the Assembly since his resignation from the Labour Front in 1956; however, he lost his re-election bid in 1963. Anson would not elect another WP candidate again until two decades later in 1981, where Joshua Benjamin Jeyaretnam claimed the seat.

On 17 July, two days after the Anson by-election, PAP's chairman Lee Kuan Yew accepted responsibility for the two by-election defeats and submitted his resignation to party chairman Toh Chin Chye, who later rejected it and upheld Lee's mandate. Lee then moved a motion of confidence in his own government in the early hours of 21 July after a thirteen-hour debate which had begun the preceding day, narrowly surviving it with 27 "Ayes", 8 "Noes" and 16 abstentions. The PAP now commanded a single seat majority in the 51-seat assembly after 13 of its members had abstained. Lee expelled the 13 who had broken ranks, perceiving that these members who abstained the vote were allegedly pro-communist and disdain loyalty to his government. These members, including Lim Chin Siong, Sidney Woodhull and Fong Swee Suan, then formed the far-left Barisan Sosialis (BS). The party reduced its majority of seats to one, and would lose its government majority on 3 July 1962, ahead of the year's integration referendum, where Ho Puay Choo defected to BS, and later on 21 August, the death of minister Ahmad Ibrahim.
