= Anson Constituency =

Former electoral division in Singapore

Anson
- Former Single Member constituency for the Parliament of Singapore
- Region: Singapore

Former constituency
- Created: 1959
- Abolished: 1988
- Seats: 1
- Member: Constituency Abolished

Anson Constituency was a constituency in Singapore. It used to exist from 1959 to 1988. During the 1988 electoral reforms, most of the constituency was merged into Tiong Bahru Group Representation Constituency (GRC) while the reminder was merged into Tanjong Pagar Single Member Constituency (SMC).

== History ==
Anson Constituency was created in 1959. It was first won by the PAP. However, David Marshall from the newly created Worker's Party would win it in the 1961 Singaporean by-elections with 43% of the votes and represent Anson until his party lost in the 1963 Singaporean general election.

Between 1963 and 1981, Anson was largely uncontested with small minority parties contesting it time to time.

In 1981, incumbent MP and NTUC Unionist, Devan Nair resigned from the PAP and the Parliament to accept the then largely ceremonial office of President as the country's head of state. This resulted in the third time Anson had a by-election. Nominations for the by-election started on 21 October. Three candidates were nominated for the by-election: PAP had Pang Kim Hin, the nephew of former minister Lim Kim San; Workers' Party (WP) secretary-general J. B. Jeyaretnam; and United People's Front Harbans Singh. Chiam See Tong, who recently founded Singapore Democratic Party (SDP) a year prior to the by-election, expressed interest but withdrew later and backed Jeyaretnam.

The by-election was eventually won by Jeyaretnam of WP, breaking PAP's monopoly of full dominance in Parliament, the first time in Singapore since 1968 an opposition party had won a parliamentary seat. Between 1981 and 1984, Jeyaretnam was the only opposition MP in Parliament. He will go on to be MP for Anson and also win with increased votes in the 1984 Singaporean general election along with SDP's Chiam See Tong in Potong Pasir Constituency.

On 10 November 1986, Jeyaretnam lost his parliamentary seat following his convictions for making false statements. No By-Elections were called for the vacated seat for 2 years and no one represented Anson between 1986 and 1988.

In 1988, the constituency was dissolved following the establishment of GRCs and SMCs.

== Member of Parliament ==
Year	Member	Party
Formation
Legislative Assembly of Singapore
1959	Baharuddin bin Mohamed Ariff	PAP
1961	David Marshall	WP
1963	Perumal Govindaswamy	PAP
Parliament of Singapore
1965	Perumal Govindaswamy	PAP
1968	Perumal Govindaswamy	PAP
1972	Perumal Govindaswamy	PAP
1976	Perumal Govindaswamy	PAP
1979	Devan Nair	PAP
1980	Devan Nair	PAP
1981	Joshua Benjamin Jeyaretnam	WP
1984	Joshua Benjamin Jeyaretnam	WP
Constituency abolished (1988)

== Electoral results ==
Note: The Elections Department does not include rejected votes when calculating the vote shares of candidates. Hence, all candidates' vote shares will total to 100% at any given election (may not appear so in multi-way contests due to rounding).

=== Elections in 1950s ===
General Election 1959
Party	Candidate	Votes	%
PAP	Baharuddin bin Mohamed Ariff	5,167	60.75
SPA	Goh Kong Beng	1,875	22.04
LSP	Tan Cheng Chuan	1,231	14.47
Independent	Wong Swee Kee	117	1.36
Independent	Krishaan Pakirisamy	116	1.38
Majority		3,292	38.71
Total valid votes		8,506	98.82
Rejected ballots		102	1.18
Turnout		8,608	86.77
Registered electors		9,921	
PAP win (new seat)			

=== Elections in 1960s ===
By-election 1961
Party	Candidate	Votes	%	±%
WP	David Marshall	3,598	43.32	N/A
PAP	Mahmud bin Awang	3,052	36.75	▼24.00
SA	Chee Phui Hung	1,482	17.84	▼4.20
LSP	Mohammed Ismail bin Haji Mohammed Hussain	104	1.25	▼13.22
Singapore Congress	Mohammed Ibrahim bin Mohd Kassim	69	0.84	N/A
Majority		546	6.57	▼32.1
Total valid votes		8,305	86.82	▼12.00
Rejected ballots		1,261	13.18	▲12.00
Turnout		9,566	97.45	▲10.68
Registered electors		9,816		▼1.06
WP gain from PAP				

General Election 1963
Party	Candidate	Votes	%	±%
PAP	Perumal Govindaswamy	3,957	46.90	▲10.15
BS	Chan Chong Keen	3,123	37.02	N/A
SA	Arthur K. Iasac	543	6.44	▼11.40
Independent	David Marshall	416	4.93	N/A
UPP	V. Vythalingam	306	3.63	N/A
WP	Chiang Seok Keong	91	1.08	▼42.2
Majority		834	9.88	▼3.31
Total valid votes		8,436	99.18	▲12.36
Rejected ballots		70	0.82	▼12.36
Turnout		8,506	92.54	▼4.91
Registered electors		9,192		▼6.36
PAP gain from WP		Swing	▲10.15	

General Election 1968
Party	Candidate	Votes	%	±%
PAP	Perumal Govindaswamy	Unopposed		
Registered electors		8,764		▼4.66
PAP hold				

=== Elections in 1970s ===
General Election 1972
Party	Candidate	Votes	%	±%
PAP	Perumal Govindaswamy	5,027	74.34	N/A
WP	Tay Kim Oh	1,291	19.09	N/A
United National Front	Paul C. Kunjaraman	444	6.57	N/A
Majority		3,736	55.25	N/A
Total valid votes		6,762	98.01	N/A
Rejected ballots		137	1.99	N/A
Turnout		6,899	84.43	N/A
Registered electors		8,171		▼6.77
PAP hold		Swing	N/A	

General Election 1976
Party	Candidate	Votes	%	±%
PAP	Perumal Govindaswamy	Unopposed		
Registered electors		12,755		▲56.10
PAP hold				

By-election 1979
Party	Candidate	Votes	%	±%
PAP	Devan Nair	8,127	86.21	N/A
UF	Johnny Wee Lai Seng	1,300	13.79	N/A
Majority		6,827	72.42	N/A
Total valid votes		9,427	97.25	N/A
Rejected ballots		267	2.75	N/A
Turnout		9,694	86.22	N/A
Registered electors		11,243		▼11.85
PAP hold				

=== Elections in 1980s ===
General Election 1980
Party	Candidate	Votes	%	±%
PAP	Devan Nair	11,564	84.10	▼2.11
UPF	P.M. Thevar	2,187	15.90	N/A
Majority		9,377	68.20	▼4.22
Total valid votes		13,751	96.67	▼0.58
Rejected ballots		473	3.33	▲0.58
Turnout		14,224	94.34	▲8.12
Registered electors		15,077		▲34.10
PAP hold		Swing	▼2.11	

By-election 1981
Party	Candidate	Votes	%	±%
WP	J.B. Jeyaretnam	7,012	51.93	N/A
PAP	Pang Kim Hin	6,359	47.10	▼37.00
UPF	Harbans Singh	131	0.97	▼14.93
Majority		653	4.83	▼63.37
Total valid votes		13,502	98.22	▲1.55
Rejected ballots		244	1.78	▼1.55
Turnout		13,746	94.72	▲0.38
Registered electors		14,512		▼3.75
WP gain from PAP				

General Election 1984
Party	Candidate	Votes	%	±%
WP	J.B. Jeyaretnam	9,909	56.81	▲4.88
PAP	Ng Pock Too	7,533	43.19	▼3.91
Majority		2,376	13.62	▲8.79
Total valid votes		17,442	98.19	▼0.03
Rejected ballots		322	1.81	▲0.03
Turnout		17,764	96.06	▲1.34
Registered electors		18,493		▲27.43
WP hold		Swing	▲4.88	
