= List of ambassadors of Singapore to France =

Singapore Ambassador to France
- Incumbent; Foo Teow Lee since 9 October 2021
- Inaugural holder: David Marshall
- Formation: 1974

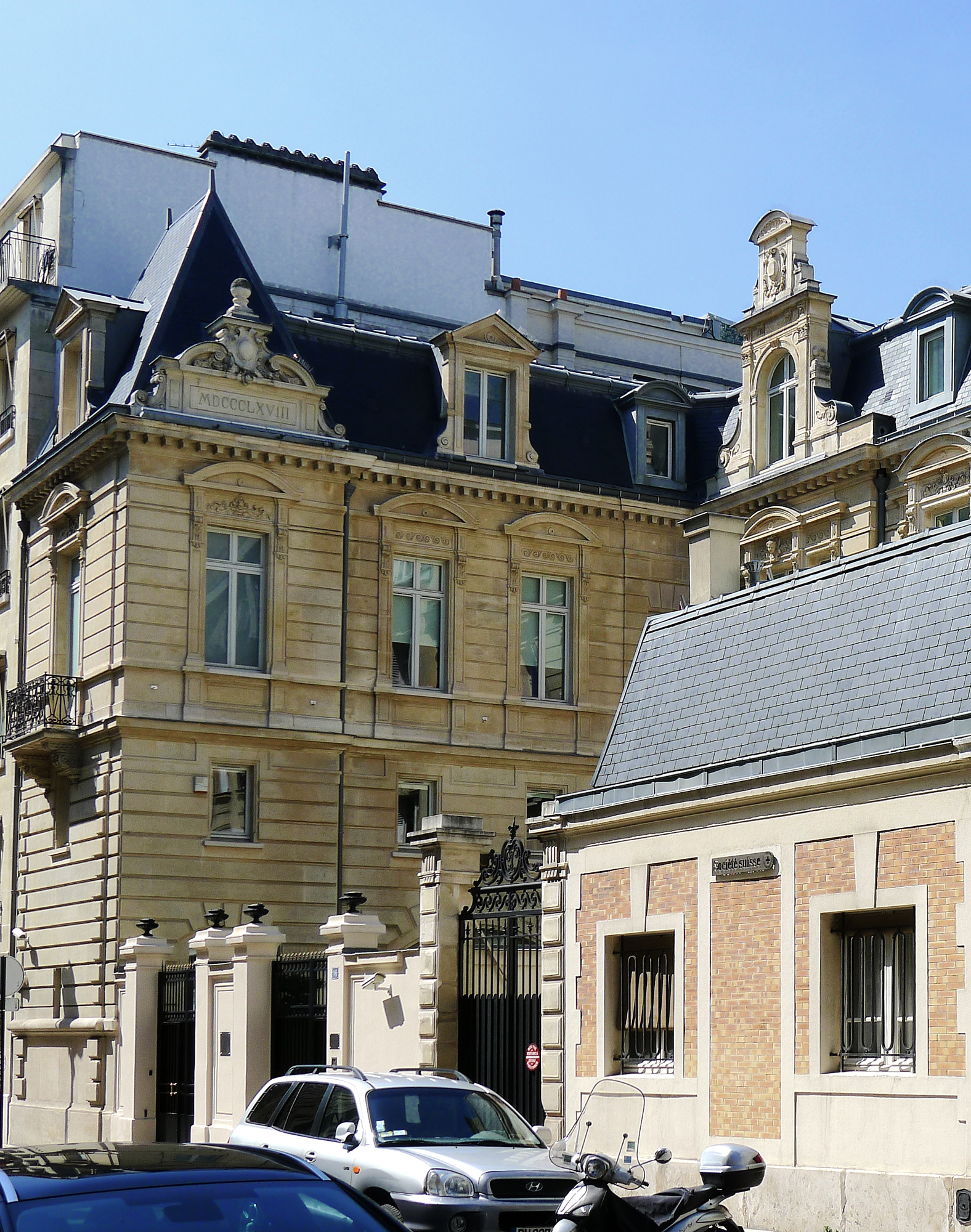
Embassy of Singapore in Paris

Singapore was first represented in France in 1974, by Abdul Aziz Bin Mahmood as the Chargé d’Affaires ad interim.

== Ambassadors ==
| Ambassador (Note: Family or Last name are in capital letters) | Tenure |
|---|---|
| David MARSHALL | 1978 – 1993 |
| FOO Meng Tong | 1994 – 1997 |
| T JASUDASEN | 1997 – 2004 |
| CHEW Tai Soo | November 2004 – October 2007 |
| Burhan GAFOOR | November 2007 – December 2010 |
| TAN York Chor | January 2011 – July 2015 |
| Zainal Arif MANTAHA | July 2015 – July 2021 |
| FOO Teow Lee | 9 October 2021 – incumbent |

Source :

== See also ==
- France–Singapore relations
