= 1957 Singapore City Council election =

- 21 December 1957

All 32 seats to the City Council 17 seats needed for a majority
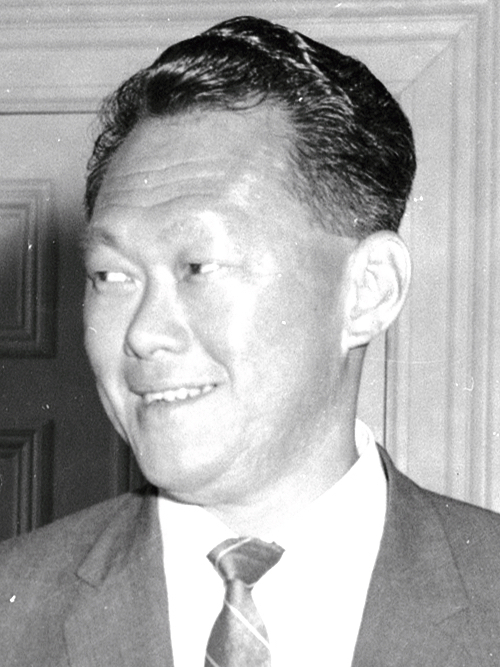

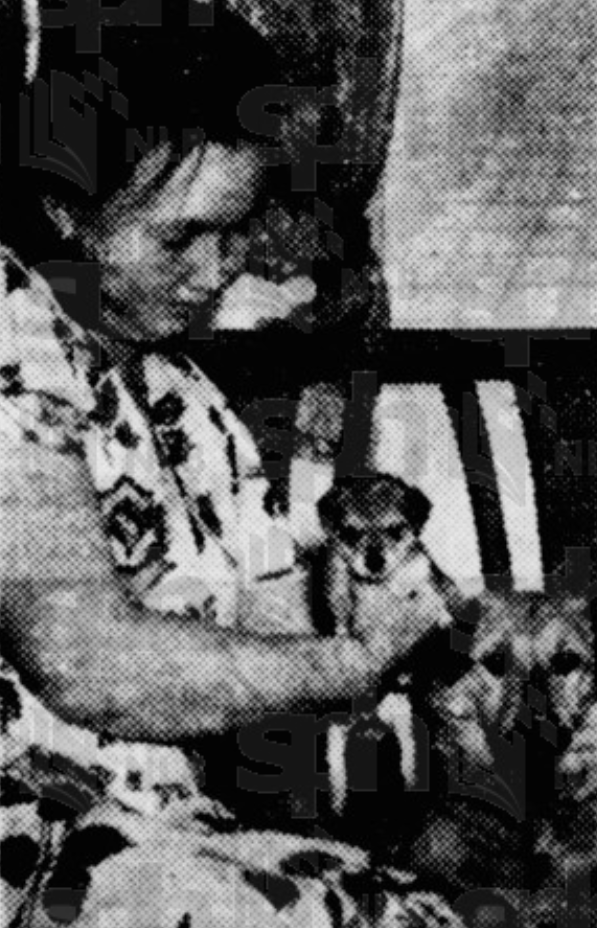

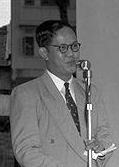
	First party	Second party	Third party
Leader	Lee Kuan Yew	Felice Leon-Soh	Lim Yew Hock
Party	PAP	LSP	LF
Leader's seat	Did not contest	Mountbatten	Did not contest
Seats won	13	7	4
Seat change	New	New	New
Popular vote	49,500	56,204	25,711
Percentage	30.61%	34.76%	15.90%
Elected Mayor
Ong Eng Guan
PAP

The 1957 Singapore City Council elections were the first in which all council seats were filled through direct popular vote, following the removal of appointed positions. Nomination Day was held on 18 November 1957, and polling took place on 21 December. A total of 32 seats were contested. For the first time, the office of Mayor of Singapore was introduced, to be awarded to the leader of the political party that secured the largest number of seats.

The People's Action Party (PAP) won the most seats with 13, although it did not achieve a majority. The Liberal Socialist Party (LSP) received the highest share of the popular vote but secured only 7 seats. As the party with the largest number of seats, the PAP was offered the mayoralty and nominated Ong Eng Guan to the post. He became the first and only elected mayor in Singapore's history.

== Results ==
Party	Votes	%	Seats	+/–
Liberal Socialist Party	56,204	34.76	7	New
People's Action Party	49,500	30.61	13	New
Labour Front	25,711	15.90	4	New
Workers' Party	11,896	7.36	4	New
United Malays National Organisation	7,832	4.84	2	+2
Independents	10,560	6.53	2	–1
Total	161,703	100.00	32	+14
Valid votes	161,703	97.76		
Invalid/blank votes	3,701	2.24		
Total votes	165,404	100.00		
Registered voters/turnout	504,291	32.80		
Source: Singapore Elections

=== By constituency ===
Under First-past-the-post voting, six candidates (out of the 14 multi-cornered contests) are elected to the council with under a simple majority (50%) of the valid votes cast. The results for Sepoy Lines came with then a record of the narrowest election margin to date at about 0.4%, which would later be surpassed by the River Valley Constituency's 0.05% margin in the 1959 Singaporean general election, two years later. PAP's Chan Choy Siong in Kreta Ayer won the best margin in the election with 86.8% of the votes cast, while the worst-performing candidate for the election was T. R. Fernandez, who garnered 258 votes, 4.2% of the valid votes cast in Delta. Only four candidates had garnered under 12.5% of their vote share and had their $250 election deposit forfeited.

Constituency	Electorate	Party	Candidate	Votes	%
Aljunied	15,033	Liberal Socialist Party	Wee Swee Hong	1,855	46.7
Aljunied	15,033	Labour Front	Sim Swee Seng	1,344	33.8
Aljunied	15,033	Independent	Tan Jin Hong	777	19.5
Anson	15,637	People's Action Party	John Mammen	2,764	53.9
Anson	15,637	Liberal Socialist Party	Sundarajulu Lakshmana Perumal	2,363	46.1
Bras Basah	16,274	People's Action Party	Sze Yih Hwa	3,345	64.7
Bras Basah	16,274	Liberal Socialist Party	Hwang Cheng Peng	1,826	35.3
Bukit Merah	12,768	Independent	Govindasamy Gopal	1,465	38.6
Bukit Merah	12,768	Liberal Socialist Party	Pang Tong Khiam	1,253	33.0
Bukit Merah	12,768	Labour Front	Ahmad bin Ismail	1,079	28.4
Cairnhill	14,148	Workers' Party	O. Subramaniam Rengasamy	1,406	34.4
Cairnhill	14,148	Liberal Socialist Party	Tan Sim Hong	1,373	33.6
Cairnhill	14,148	Labour Front	P. Ramasamy	1,313	32.1
Crawford	15,547	People's Action Party	Baharuddin bin Mohamed Ariff	4,355	67.0
Crawford	15,547	Liberal Socialist Party	Lee Thiam Chuan	1,220	18.8
Crawford	15,547	Independent	Neo Tai Kim	923	14.2
Delta	16,916	Workers' Party	John Cruz Corera	3,391	54.9
Delta	16,916	Liberal Socialist Party	Peck Boon Kang	1,273	20.6
Delta	16,916	Labour Front	Tan Jin Hong	1,251	20.3
Delta	16,916	Independent	T. R. Fernandez	258	4.2
Farrer Park	13,826	Independent	Karuppiah Nalliah	1,335	29.8
Farrer Park	13,826	Liberal Socialist Party	Vetrivelu Rengaswamy	1,141	25.5
Farrer Park	13,826	Labour Front	Mariappan Verappan	1,074	24.0
Farrer Park	13,826	Independent	Soo-Tho Siu Hee	933	20.8
Geylang East	17,966	People's Action Party	Kum Teng Hock	3,154	54.0
Geylang East	17,966	Liberal Socialist Party	Lee Kip Hiang	2,051	35.1
Geylang East	17,966	Independent	Ng Cheng Chwee	640	10.9
Geylang West	18,112	People's Action Party	Peter Lau Por Tuck	3,703	79.1
Geylang West	18,112	Liberal Socialist Party	Teo Koh Bee	979	20.9
Havelock	18,422	Labour Front	Lee Hwee Yiow	2,979	54.5
Havelock	18,422	Liberal Socialist Party	Ang Khye Chia	2,487	45.5
Hong Lim	13,127	People's Action Party	Ong Eng Guan	3,918	82.9
Hong Lim	13,127	Liberal Socialist Party	Lee Kok Liang	810	17.1
Jalan Besar	13,416	People's Action Party	Chan Chee Seng	2,430	52.9
Jalan Besar	13,416	Liberal Socialist Party	Lee Chee Seng	1,660	36.2
Jalan Besar	13,416	Workers' Party	Cheong Min Chee	501	10.9
Kallang	14,302	Workers' Party	Chiang Yueh Thong	2,704	41.5
Kallang	14,302	Liberal Socialist Party	Tan Hai Tong	1,831	28.1
Kallang	14,302	Labour Front	Henry Leong	1,484	22.8
Kallang	14,302	Independent	Lau Liat Meng	499	7.7
Kampong Glam	15,609	People's Action Party	Hoe Puay Choo	3,615	60.9
Kampong Glam	15,609	Liberal Socialist Party	Lam Chock Chuan	1,203	20.3
Kampong Glam	15,609	Independent	Daud bin Mohamed Yunos	1,119	18.8
Kampong Kapor	19,334	People's Action Party	Wee Toon Boon	3,860	51.8
Kampong Kapor	19,334	Liberal Socialist Party	Ng Teik Sim	1,861	25.0
Kampong Kapor	19,334	Independent	Sim Beng Seng	1,735	23.3
Kreta Ayer	16,950	People's Action Party	Chan Choy Siong	3,034	86.8
Kreta Ayer	16,950	Liberal Socialist Party	Lee Ho Kee	460	13.2
Moulmein	12,020	Liberal Socialist Party	Lim Choo Sye	1,890	57.0
Moulmein	12,020	Labour Front	Lam Hock Chye	1,428	43.0
Mountbatten	13,728	Liberal Socialist Party	Felice Leon-Soh	1,818	55.9
Mountbatten	13,728	Labour Front	Saul Hugh Zakoo	1,436	44.1
Pasir Panjang	10,274	Liberal Socialist Party	Ong Say Yeo	2,358	58.7
Pasir Panjang	10,274	Labour Front	Ahmad bin Mohamed Yatim	1,660	41.3
Queenstown	11,429	Labour Front	Tang Peng Yeu	2,796	75.0
Queenstown	11,429	Liberal Socialist Party	Leong Poh Seng	934	25.0
River Valley	14,865	Labour Front	Ho Kok Hoe	2,164	52.0
River Valley	14,865	Liberal Socialist Party	Wong Peng Tuck	1,996	48.0
Rochore	16,333	People's Action Party	Lin You Eng	4,258	63.9
Rochore	16,333	Liberal Socialist Party	Ong Lip Hua	1,527	22.9
Rochore	16,333	Independent	Tang Beng Cheong	876	13.2
Sepoy Lines	16,281	Liberal Socialist Party	Manickavasagar Subramaniam	2,904	50.2
Sepoy Lines	16,281	People's Action Party	Kang Meng Kim	2,880	49.8
Stamford	17,860	Labour Front	George Benjamin Armstrong	1,470	53.9
Stamford	17,860	Liberal Socialist Party	Gopal Krishnan Gosain	1,257	46.1
Tanglin	18,775	United Malays National Organisation	Mohamed Shariff bin Dollah	1,950	42.5
Tanglin	18,775	Liberal Socialist Party	Syed Omar bin Abdulrahman Alsagoff	1,547	33.7
Tanglin	18,775	Labour Front	Lim Siew Chuan	1,091	23.8
Tanjong Pagar	14,721	People's Action Party	Ong Pang Boon	3,354	71.9
Tanjong Pagar	14,721	Liberal Socialist Party	Lim Siew Lay	1,311	28.1
Telok Ayer	24,412	Workers' Party	Wang Tsun Hao	3,894	55.6
Telok Ayer	24,412	Liberal Socialist Party	Chua Keng Eng	2,081	29.7
Telok Ayer	24,412	Labour Front	Yap Tean Hock	1,034	14.8
Telok Blangah	18,476	United Malays National Organisation	Syed Ali bin Zedha Alsagoff	3,432	51.3
Telok Blangah	18,476	Liberal Socialist Party	Chua Bock Kwee	3,262	48.7
Tiong Bahru	13,863	Liberal Socialist Party	Lee Bah Chee	2,285	52.0
Tiong Bahru	13,863	Labour Front	Lim Huan Seng	2,108	14.8
Toa Payoh	18,416	People's Action Party	Wong Soon Fong	4,830	62.9
Toa Payoh	18,416	Liberal Socialist Party	Khoo Siaw Hua	2,846	37.1
Ulu Pandan	15,451	Liberal Socialist Party	Chua Kim Kee	2,542	50.9
Ulu Pandan	15,451	United Malays National Organisation	Ibrahim bin Othman	2,450	49.1
Source: Singapore Elections
