= Liberal Socialist Party (Singapore) =

Defunct political party in Singapore

- Chinese name: 自由社会党
- Malay name: Parti Liberal Sosialis
- Tamil name: தாராண்மை சமூகவுடைமைக் கட்சி
- Founder: E.K. Tan
- Founded: 5 February 1956; 69 years ago
- Legalised: 24 May 1961; 64 years ago
- Dissolved: 10 September 1963; 62 years ago
- Merger of: Progressive Party; Democratic Party
- Succeeded by: Singapore People's Alliance
- Ideology: Liberal socialism; Social liberalism; Progressivism
- Political position: Centre-left
- Colors: Orange

The Liberal Socialist Party (abbreviation: LSP) was a political party in Singapore that operated from 1956 to 1963.

== History ==
LSP was founded in February 1956 from the merger of the Progressive Party (PP) and the Democratic Party (DP), the latter not to be confused with the Singapore Democratic Party (SDP). The move was deemed advantageous, as PP had the numerical strength in lawyers, while DP had the patronage and support of wealthy Chinese businessmen. It consolidated the relatively compatible and similar aims of DP and PP, that of gradual and nonradical progressivism implementing liberal policies. The decision was also driven by the weak performance of both parties in the 1955 general election.

LSP was led by E.K. Tan. It wanted to pursue an economic programme to foster job creation, improve the inflow of foreign investment, and reduce industrial disputes. It also wanted to improve social welfare by expanding public housing, and establishing a national health insurance scheme.

In the 1957 by-elections in June, LSP fielded candidates for Cairnhill and Tanjong Pagar with some measure of success, gaining the Cairnhill seat which David Marshall of Labour Front (LF) had vacated in resigning as Chief Minister. This was followed by the City Council election in December in which LSP contested a majority but won only seven seats, while the People's Action Party (PAP) won 13 of 14 contested seats, with Ong Eng Guan sworn in as the first Mayor of Singapore.

In 1958, members of LSP left to form another political party, the Singapore People's Alliance (SPA) with former members of the LF and Workers' Party. LSP fielded 32 candidates to contest the 1959 general election but performed badly, failing to win any seats. The PAP secured 43 of the 51 seats, winning the general election by a landslide victory, and forming Singapore's first fully elected self-government granted by the British authorities. The SPA won four seats and became the largest opposition in the legislative assembly.

In the 1961 by-elections, LSP fielded a candidate for Anson but failed to gain any ground. Against the tumultuous backdrop of heated PAP-UMNO relations between Singapore and Malaya, and an internal political struggle between PAP and Barisan Sosialis, LSP was disbanded by its remnant members led by Felice Leon-Soh.

== Election performance ==
=== Legislative Assembly ===
| Election | Leader | Votes | % | Seats | | | | | Position | Result |
| Election | Leader | Votes | % | Contested | | | Total | +/– | Position | Result |
| Election | Leader | Votes | % | Seats | Won | Lost | Total | +/– | Position | Result |
|---|---|---|---|---|---|---|---|---|---|---|
| 1959 | E.K. Tan | 42,805 | 8.21% | 32 | 0 | 32 | 0 / 51 | ▼6 | 3rd | No seats |

==== Seats contested ====
| Election | Constituencies contested | Contested vote % |
|---|---|---|
| 1959 | Aljunied, Anson, Bras Basah, Bukit Panjang, Bukit Timah, Cairnhill, Changi, Crawford, Delta, Havelock, Hong Lim, Jalan Besar, Joo Chiat, Jurong, Kampong Glam, Kreta Ayer, Moulmein, Mountbatten, Nee Soon, Punggol, River Valley, Rochore, Sembawang, Serangoon Gardens, Siglap, Southern Islands, Stamford, Tanglin, Tanjong Pagar, Tiong Bahru, Ulu Pandan, Upper Serangoon | 13.2% |

=== By-elections ===
==== Legislative Assembly ====
| Election | Leader | Constituency contested | Votes | % | Seats | | | | Result |
| Election | Leader | Constituency contested | Votes | % | Contested | | Total | +/– | Result |
| Election | Leader | Constituency contested | Votes | % | Won | Lost | Total | +/– | Result |
|---|---|---|---|---|---|---|---|---|---|
| 1957 | E.K. Tan | Cairnhill; Tanjong Pagar | 3,657 | 28.41% | 1 | 1 | 1 / 2 | ▲1 | Won |
| 1961 | E.K. Tan | Anson | 104 | 0.51% | 0 | 1 | 0 / 2 | Steady | Lost |
