= Ong Eng Guan =

Singaporean politician (1925–2008)

- 王永元
- Ong in 1959

Minister for National Development
- In office 5 June 1959 – 20 June 1960
- Prime Minister: Lee Kuan Yew
- Preceded by: Abdul Hamid bin Haji Jumat (as Minister for Local Government, Lands and Housing)
- Succeeded by: Toh Chin Chye (acting)

Mayor of Singapore
- In office 24 December 1957 – 18 April 1959
- Deputy: Ong Pang Boon
- Preceded by: Position established
- Succeeded by: Position abolished

Member of the Legislative Assembly for Hong Lim Constituency
- In office 29 April 1961 – 16 June 1965
- Succeeded by: Lee Khoon Choy
- In office 30 May 1959 – 29 December 1960
- Preceded by: Constituency established
- Majority: 1959: 8,834 (77.0%); 1961: 7,747 (73.3%); 1963: 5,066 (44.5%)

Member of the City Council of Singapore for Hong Lim Constituency
- In office 21 December 1957 – 18 April 1959
- Preceded by: Constituency established
- Succeeded by: Constituency abolished
- Majority: 1957: 3,918 (82.9%)

Personal details
- Born: 1925 Malacca, Straits Settlements
- Died: 2008 (age 82–83) Singapore
- Party: United People's Party (1961–1965)
- Other political affiliations: People's Action Party (1954–1960)
- Profession: Accountant

Ong Eng Guan (Note: Chinese: 王永元; pinyin: Wáng Yǒngyuán) (1925–2008) was a Singaporean politician and an early member of the People's Action Party (PAP). A charismatic and forceful orator fluent in Chinese, Ong became widely respected within the Chinese-speaking community, particularly for his strong anti-communist stance and ability to connect with the grassroots. He first entered politics through the City Council of Singapore, where he made history by becoming the first and only elected mayor of Singapore following the 1957 City Council election. His tenure as mayor earned him a reputation for being bold and outspoken, characteristics that set him apart in the early years of self-government. In 1959, after the PAP's victory in the general election, Ong was appointed Minister for National Development in Singapore's first fully elected government.

Despite his early successes, Ong's relationship with the PAP leadership soon deteriorated due to differences in political style and personal conflicts. In 1960, he was dismissed from the cabinet and the party. Ong and went on to form his own political party in 1961, the United People's Party (UPP). The move underscored his determination to remain an influential political figure outside the dominant PAP framework. Although he retained significant personal popularity especially among segments of the Chinese electorate, his break with the ruling party limited his long-term political prospects. Nevertheless, Ong was a notable figure in Singapore's early political development, having played a key role in the formative years of the nation's self-governance.

== Early life and education ==
Ong was born in Malacca, Straits Settlements, in 1925 and spent 25 years living in Batu Pahat, Johor, where he received a dual-track education in both an English government school and a private Chinese school. He later pursued higher education in Australia, graduating with a Bachelor of Commerce degree and a diploma in public administration from the University of Melbourne. Ong arrived in Singapore in 1954 and established an accountancy firm.

== Political career ==
In July 1955, Ong was elected into PAP's Central Executive Committee (CEC) as the treasurer. Ong contested the Hong Lim Constituency in the 1957 Singapore City Council election and was elected with around 83 percent of the votes. As PAP won the most seats with 13 against Liberal Socialist Party's seven seats, PAP was offered the mayoralty and Ong was nominated as the mayor by PAP, becoming the first and only elected mayor of Singapore.

Ong, although firmly anti-communist, held a strong anti-colonial stance which often placed him at odds with the British authorities. His fiery rhetoric and confrontational style made City Council meetings highly popular among the public, with sessions frequently described as a form of entertainment due to his dramatic speeches and challenges to colonial policies. From December 1957 until April 1959, Ong led the City Council until he was told to resign as mayor to stand in Singapore's first fully elected Legislative Assembly election in the Hong Lim Constituency.

His influence and popularity among the Chinese community positioned him as a significant political figure during the transitional years of self-governance.

=== Internal vote for prime minister ===
In the 1959 general election, the PAP secured control of the Legislative Assembly, triggering a reported internal contest within the party leadership. With no formal process to select a prime minister-elect, a vote was allegedly held between Ong and Lee Kuan Yew, resulting in a tie. Party chairman Toh Chin Chye was said to have cast the deciding vote in favour of Lee. While Toh and another party member later confirmed this account, Lee and several others denied it. Ong was appointed as Singapore's first Minister for National Development in Lee's Cabinet. With the appointment, Ong moved all the powers and duties of the City Council to the Ministry of National Development but tensions soon emerged between him and the rest of the Cabinet, especially over the decision to abolish the City Council.

In June 1960, during a PAP conference, Ong submitted 16 resolutions to the CEC criticising the leadership, resulting in his dismissal from the cabinet. Ong was later expelled from the party on 29 July 1960. S. V. Lingam and Ng Teng Kian were also expelled at the same time for aiding and abetting Ong against the party.

=== Post–PAP ===
On 29 December 1960, Ong resigned from the Legislative Assembly, compelling the government to call a by-election. He contested as an independent candidate and won, defeating PAP's Jek Yeun Thong despite the party's leadership actively campaigning for Jek. Ong's victory highlighted his enduring popularity. That same year, he founded the United People's Party (UPP), positioning it as an alternative to the PAP. However, in the 1963 general election, the UPP secured only one seat out of the 46 it contested, which was won by Ong himself at Hong Lim. Two years later, on 16 June 1965, Ong resigned from the Legislative Assembly and withdrew from political life, citing the infrequent sittings of the legislature as his reason for retirement.

In chapter 40 of the first volume of his memoirs, The Singapore Story, Lee Kuan Yew recounted that he learned through Ong's former political secretary from when he was mayor that the Malaysian federal government had influenced Ong to resign. The intention was to trigger a by-election to gauge the PAP's support in Singapore, as part of a potential strategy to neutralise PAP leaders under the Internal Security Act (ISA).

== Post-politics and death ==
After his retirement from politics in 1965, Ong led a largely private and non-political life, withdrawing from the public eye. Little is documented about his activities or personal affairs during this period. Ong died in 2008 at the age of 83.
