= Hong Lim Constituency =

Electoral ward in Singapore

Coordinates: 1.2862°N 103.848°E

- Former constituency
- Region: Central Region, Singapore

Former constituency
- Abolished: 1976
- Created from: Constituency established

Hong Lim Constituency was a constituency in Chinatown, Singapore. It was created in 1959 and dissolved in 1976 but is currently part of Jalan Besar GRC (Kreta Ayer–Kim Seng).

The constituency dwindled in population since its creation. In 1968, 1,615 voters were shifted to Bukit Ho Swee. Later on, 5,162 voters were shifted to Serangoon private houses. The remaining people were merged into Telok Ayer.

== Member of Parliament ==
| Election | Member of Parliament | Party |
Legislative Assembly of Singapore
| 1959 | Ong Eng Guan | PAP |
| 1961 | Ong Eng Guan | Independent |
| 1963 | Ong Eng Guan | UPP |
| 1965 | Lee Khoon Choy | PAP |
Parliament of Singapore
| 1968 | Lee Khoon Choy | PAP |
| 1972 | Lee Khoon Choy | PAP |

Note : Ong Eng Guan resigned from the Legislative Assembly in 1965

== Electoral results ==
Note: The Elections Department does not include rejected votes when calculating the vote shares of candidates. Hence, all candidates' vote shares will total to 100% at any given election (may not appear so in multi-way contests due to rounding).

=== Elections in 1950s ===
General Election 1959: Hong Lim
| Party | Candidate | Votes | % | ±% |
|---|---|---|---|---|
| PAP | Ong Eng Guan | 8,834 | 77.0 | |
| MCA | Loh Ngian Lim | 1,192 | 10.4 | |
| LSP | Tan Hong Chye | 856 | 7.5 | |
| SPA | Sim Wee Teck | 588 | 5.1 | |
| Majority | | 7,642 | 66.6 | N/A |
| Turnout | | 11,604 | 91.6 | |
| PAP win (new seat) | | | | |

=== Elections in 1960s ===
By-election of 29 April 1961: Hong Lim
| Party | Candidate | Votes | % | ±% |
|---|---|---|---|---|
| Independent | Ong Eng Guan | 7,747 | 73.3 | +73.3 |
| PAP | Jek Yeun Thong | 2,820 | 26.7 | −50.3 |
| Majority | | 4,927 | 46.6 | N/A |
| Turnout | | 10,818 | 91.0 | −0.6 |
| Independent gain from PAP | | Swing | N/A | |

General Election 1963: Hong Lim
| Party | Candidate | Votes | % | ±% |
|---|---|---|---|---|
| UPP | Ong Eng Guan | 5,066 | 44.5 | −28.8 |
| PAP | Seah Mui Kok | 3,789 | 33.3 | +6.6 |
| BS | Lim Chien Sen | 2,344 | 20.6 | |
| SA | Sam Tai Guan | 191 | 1.7 | −13.8 |
| Majority | | 1,277 | 11.2 | N/A |
| Turnout | | 11,463 | 95.5 | |
| UPP hold | | Swing | | |

By-election 1965: Hong Lim
| Party | Candidate | Votes | % | ±% |
|---|---|---|---|---|
| PAP | Lee Khoon Choy | 6,398 | 59.5 | +26.2 |
| BS | Ong Chang Sam | 4,346 | 40.5 | +19.9 |
| Majority | | 2,052 | 19.0 | N/A |
| Turnout | | 10,858 | 91.7 | +0.7 |
| PAP gain from UPP | | Swing | N/A | |
