= United People's Party (Singapore) =

Left-wing political organization in Singapore

- Chinese name: 人民团结党
- Malay name: Parti Rakyat Bersatu
- Founder: Ong Eng Guan
- Founded: 14 July 1961; 65 years ago
- Dissolved: 4 December 2025; 7 months ago (de jure)
- Ideology: Anti-colonialism; Reformism; Anti-communism
- Colours: Blue

The United People's Party (abbreviation: UPP) was a political party in Singapore founded by former People's Action Party (PAP) Minister Ong Eng Guan. The party was officially registered on 14 July 1961. In the 1963 general election, the UPP fielded 46 candidates to contest 51 seats in the Legislative Assembly. Despite the broad participation, the party secured only one seat, won by Ong himself in the Hong Lim seat, where he garnered 44.5 per cent of the vote, a significant decline compared to the over 70 per cent majority he had achieved in the 1959 election under the PAP and the 1961 by-election as an independent.

The future of the UPP became uncertain following Singapore's separation from the Malaysia in 1965. In June of that year, Ong resigned from his legislative seat citing the lack of an "effective media whereby opposition parties can convey their message to the people". The by-election for his vacated seat was subsequently won by the PAP. After this the UPP became dormant and ceased contesting in further elections, but it remained officially registered as a political party.

On 7 August 2025, the Singapore Ministry of Home Affairs sought proof of UPP's existence along with 13 other political parties due to its failure to comply with the Foreign Interference (Countermeasures) Act 2021. If there is no proof of existence provided to the Singapore Government within three months, the Registrar of Societies will deem the party as officially defunct. The party was officially deregistered on 4 December 2025.

== Election results ==
=== Legislative Assembly ===
Election	Leader	Votes	%	Seats					Position	Result
Election	Leader	Votes	%	Contested			Total	+/–	Position	Result
Election	Leader	Votes	%	Seats	Won	Lost	Total	+/–	Position	Result
1963	Ong Eng Guan	48,967	8.39%	46	1	45	1 / 51	▲1	▲4th	Opposition
