= 1955 Singaporean constitutional crisis =

- Part of the chief ministership of David Marshall
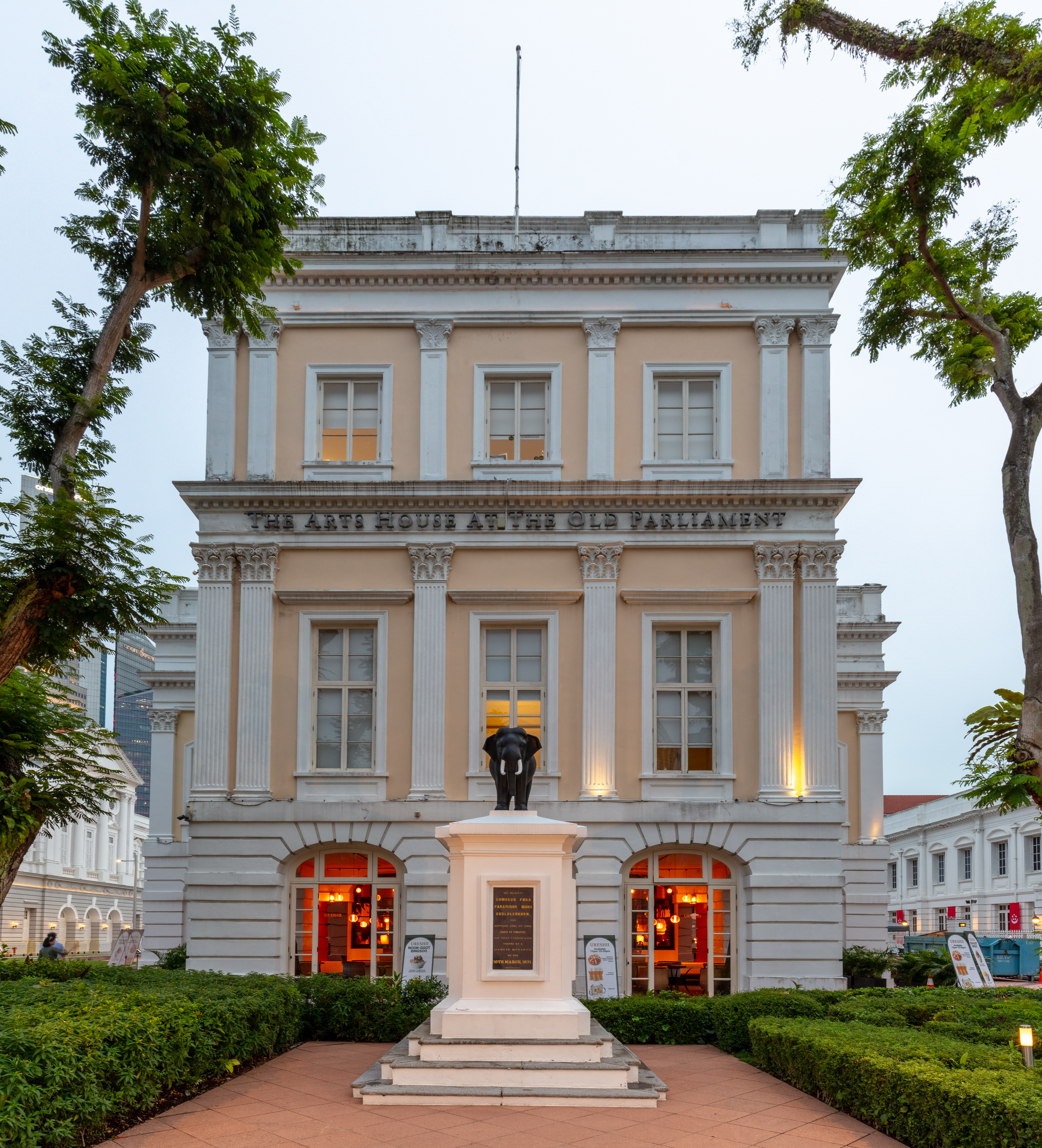
- The Old Parliament House, the former meeting place of the Legislative Assembly.
- Date: 9 July 1955 – 17 August 1955 (1 month, 1 week and 1 day)
- Location: Colony of Singapore
- Caused by: Appointments of assistant ministers.; Disagreements over the chief minister and governor's powers, per the Rendel Constitution.
- Result: Singapore's constitution rewritten to benefit the elected ministers, with the governor required to act on the advice or in consultation with the chief minister.; Further discussions of self-governance to be held in London.

Parties
| Legislative Assembly of Singapore; Labour Front–SUMNO–Malayan Chinese Association coalition; People's Action Party; Democratic Party; Malay Union | British Government; Governor of Singapore; Secretary of State for the Colonies; Progressive Party |

Lead figures
| David Marshall (LF); Lim Yew Hock (LF); J. M. Jumabhoy (LF); A. J. Braga (LF); Francis Thomas (LF); Chew Swee Kee (LF); Abdul Hamid Jumat (SUMNO); Lee Kuan Yew (PAP) | Sir Robin Black; Alan Lennox-Boyd; Queen Elizabeth II; Sir William Goode; E. V. Davies; T. M. Hart; G. A. P. Sutherland |

On 9 July 1955, a constitutional crisis emerged following disagreements regarding the Rendel Constitution's powers between Singaporean chief minister David Marshall and governor of Singapore Sir Robin Black, which culminated with Marshall threatening resignation and forcing fresh elections. A member of the Labour Front (LF), Marshall led the LF–SUMNO–MCA coalition government following the 1955 general election.

Following the quelling of multiple strikes and riots, he felt that his government was inadequate and inefficient, with his ministers often overworked. With the arrival of Black as the new governor, Marshall asked him to appoint four new assistant ministers under the Rendel Constitution. However, Black refused and only offered him two assistant ministers. Marshall considered the issue of "grave constitutional importance" and threatened to resign; his government had only been in office for three months at that time. The threat brought alarm within Singapore and from the British, concerned over fresh elections that would have to be held.

In the following period, Marshall received several calls persuading him to stay, including Gold Coast prime minister Kwame Nkrumah and commissioner-general Malcolm MacDonald. A motion was passed in the Legislative Assembly that agreed upon ending colonial rule, rewriting the constitution to benefit those elected with the view of self-governance, and that the governor would act on the advice of the chief minister. Marshall then decided to postpone his resignation until the arrival of Secretary of State for the Colonies Alan Lennox-Boyd, whom Black requested to help.

After discussions between Marshall and Lennox-Boyd, it was decided that the constitution be amended in favour of the elected ministers, with the governor required to act on the advice or in consultation with the chief minister. Additionally, for further discussions on self-governance, the British welcomed a Singaporean delegation to London. Marshall's actions in the 1955 constitutional crisis have been praised by historians, although contemporaneous sources criticised Marshall's behaviour. The crisis helped accelerate negotiations for Singapore's self-government and eventual independence, defying the British's former slower paced plans for gradual self-governance.

== Background ==
In 1955, the Rendel Constitution was enacted, which stated that 25 of the 32 members of the Legislative Assembly would be elected via popular vote and a Council of Ministers would be established, composing six members chosen by the leader of the largest party or coalition of the Assembly and three ex-officio members. At the 1955 general election in April, the Labour Front (LF) gained the most seats with ten and entered a coalition with the SUMNO–Malayan Chinese Association (MCA) alliance; (Note: The alliance consisted of the SUMNO, MCA, and Malay Union (MU), but the latter withdrew from the agreement. SUMNO and MCA both won one seat at the election.) LF leader David Marshall subsequently became the first chief minister.

From April to July, Marshall's government faced multiple strikes and riots, such as the Hock Lee bus riots. A further planned general strike on 13 June was thwarted following the arrests of five conspirators, significantly reducing the number of strikers on the actual day. A final meeting on 5 July settled the issues faced by the unionists. On 1 July, Sir John Nicoll was succeeded by Sir Robin Black as governor. In the aftermath of the civil unrest, Marshall considered his government inefficient and inadequate in handling the largely left-wing-motivated attacks. He planned to solve this issue by appointing additional assistant ministers.

Furthermore, Marshall wanted to reduce infighting within the LF with the appointments. Earlier in his administration, R. C. H. Lim's nomination as a member of the Assembly drew criticism from LF executive committee member C. H. Koh, who threatened to resign from the party. Francis Thomas's appointment as a minister was similarly disliked by LF assemblymen Mak Pak Shee, A. R. Lazarous, and Lee Choon Eng; Marshall promised them ministerial appointments after three months. Marshall's cabinet members similarly supported the assistant ministerial appointments as they felt overworked and restricted in their efficiency.

== Crisis ==
On 4 July, Marshall submitted four names – Mak, Lee, Mohamed Sidik, and M. P. D. Nair – to Black, asking him to appoint them as assistant ministers. He gave three reasons for the appointments: his current ministers were overworked, it would help train and give more experience to the local politicians, and would aid in managing future disputes with the civil service more effectively. According to the Rendel Constitution, Marshall believed the governor could create up to nine assistant ministers, (Note: There was already one assistant minister at the time, J. M. Jumabhoy, who served as the assistant minister for commerce and industry.) and he wanted to appoint these four first and would ask for the rest in the future. Marshall further called on Black on 6 July.

However, Black disagreed with Marshall's reasoning as four new ministers to the existing ten meant that "all but five of those on the government side [...] would have been enjoying the perquisites of office". On 9 July, Black replied that he would only agree to two appointments. In response, Marshall called it a matter of "grave constitutional importance" and threatened to resign. He considered it a constitutional crisis as the governor had rejected the ministers's suggestions, and if the governor were allowed to do so, his government would effectively be a sham. The main dispute was of section 32 of the Rendel Constitution, which read:

32. The Governor after consultation with the Chief Minister may from among elected members in the Assembly appoint Assistant Ministers to assist ministers in the discharge of their duties and functions.

Marshall believed that "may" was equivalent to "shall" or "must", while Black argued that "consultation with the Chief Minister" did not mean that the governor had to accept the chief minister's suggestions, as detailed in section 19(2) which laid out specific scenarios in which the governor was bound to the advice of the chief minister. Furthermore, accepting Marshall's interpretation of section 32 implied that Singapore was a self-governing state. The Rendel Constitution itself was intended to help with slower gradual progress towards self-governance. Marshall further stated that, by refusing, Black conveyed an expression of no-confidence.

Nonetheless, his sudden threat of resignation brought alarm from Singapore and the British. They were worried about the fresh elections that would have to be held so soon, which could have resulted in a more conservative government being elected, along with the political crisis that would ensue; some political parties had already begun strategising with one another. Reportedly, while none of his cabinet members opposed the appointments, they did not find the issue worth fighting for, with some willing to accept the compromise of two assistant ministers. Among those who persuaded Marshall not to resign include his fellow assemblymen, Gold Coast prime minister Kwame Nkrumah, and commissioner-general Malcolm MacDonald.

== Developments ==
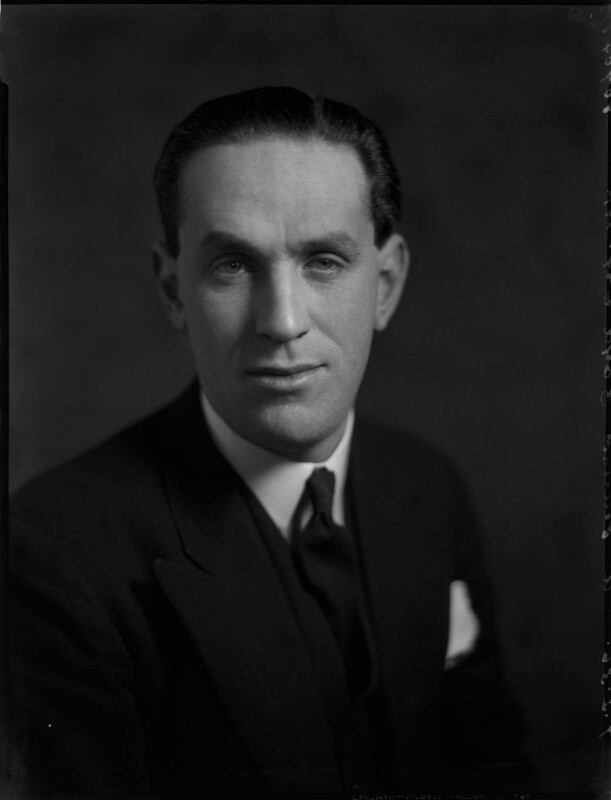
Alan Lennox-Boyd, pictured in 1936

On 19 July, Marshall met with Black, where he asked him to postpone his resignation until the arrival of Secretary of State for the Colonies Alan Lennox-Boyd, who was currently embarking on a tour of the East and scheduled to arrive to Singapore in August, which Marshall agreed to. He subsequently held an emergency meeting of the Legislative Assembly on 22 July, where he submitted a motion to end colonial rule, rewrite the constitution to benefit those elected with the view of self-governance, and have the governor act on the advice of the chief minister; the latter would have, in effect, required transferring powers from the governor to the chief minister. The Progressive Party (PP) (Note: The PP were known to have pro-British views; its leader C. C. Tan had remarked that "only fools and criminals" would want independence. In 1948, they had pledged for an elected majority by 1951 in order to achieve self-governance, but withdrew the statement and did not set a new deadline. Marshall, a former member of the PP, later contested against Tan at the 1955 general election to confront his and the PP's views.) criticised Marshall's resignation threat as a "selfish motive", finding the assistant ministerial appointments to be a minor issue not worth resigning over.

During the debate, the People's Action Party (PAP) was called the only party that "supported the motion wholeheartedly", according to the author Kevin Tan. PAP assemblyman Lee Kuan Yew, who was considered the de facto leader of the opposition, seconded Marshall's motion. Lee stated that there were only three outcomes: a new constitution, a suspension of the constitution, or fresh elections. He argued that a new constitution would benefit no one, as "whatever permutations and combinations of progressives, independents, and deserters" would not "give this constitution any chance, if it ever had any, of working". A suspension would have benefitted the communists, while fresh elections were too precarious; if the PP won, Lee argued that progress towards self-governance would stall.

At 4:00 pm (SST), the Legislative Assembly adjourned the debate to 25 July. At the following discussion, PP assemblyman Lim Koon Teck proposed an amendment to change the motion to give Singapore independence via a full transfer of power. (Note: Full text: "that in the opinion of this House the time has arrived for a transfer of power from the Government of the United Kingdom to the people of Singapore, and that a new constitution providing for independence should be granted immediately.") This elicited laughter from the Assembly, as it had unexpectedly came from the pro-British PP, who were against independence. In her 1984 biography of Marshall, the academic Chan Heng Chee theorised that, in an act of "political one-upmanship", the PP made such an "unpremeditated and blundering move" that only served to "[strengthen] Marshall's hand". Similarly, members of the Assembly criticised the PP's sudden change of opinion, with Lee describing it "a piece of political chicanery" and assistant minister J. M. Jumabhoy terming the move "political acrobatics".

Nonetheless, Marshall amended the amendment to replace "independence" with "self-government". It was supported by twenty-eight members of the Assembly, while G. A. P. Sutherland was the sole dissenter; (Note: Sutherland was a nominated member of the Assembly who was a self-described "representative of the British expatriates". Throughout the debate, he faced heavy criticism from the government, with Marshall remarking "now you know what the people of Malaya think" following the vote.) the three British officials – E. J. Davies, William Goode, and T. M. Hart – abstained from voting. Following this agreement, Marshall decided to postpone his resignation until the arrival of Lennox-Boyd. He clarified that he would not resign if the British agreed to review terms of self-government, but would do so if they refused to recognise their interpretation of the constitution or work towards self-government. Lennox-Boyd arrived on 31 July, where he held talks with Marshall discussing the order of command of the officials as well as gaining self-governance before the end of the LF's term. Lennox-Boyd left soon after to travel to the Federation of Malaya, but returned on 15 August, where they held further discussions.

On 18 August, the colonial authorities announced that they would amend the constitution to have the governor's powers work to the elected ministers's benefit, with the governor required to act on the advice or in consultation with the chief minister; except in the matters of proroguing or dissolving the Assembly. They further invited a Singaporean delegation to travel to London to discuss self-government and the constitution.

== Aftermath ==
In the press, Marshall was described as "very pleased" with the outcome, with the constitutional crisis having been considered by the Singapore Standard as over. That same day, Marshall submitted a motion in which he wanted to show appreciation towards Black and Lennox-Boyd, but this received criticism from the opposition. Lee disagreed with Lennox-Boyd's vague wording when inviting a Singaporean delegation to London – as it did not fulfil the demand of immediate self-government – and found the British insincere. The entire opposition then orchestrated a walk-out, with only Sutherland remaining. Regardless, the government voted in support of the motion.

On 25 August, a motion by PP assemblyman Lim Choon Mong arguing that appointing more assistant ministers would be undesirable was ultimately lost after 16 voted against, with only 5 in support. As Marshall intended to make the original four nominees into assistant ministers, Nair's appointment was met with protests by LF–alliance members, as he was not a member of the LF–alliance and they believed that party members should take precedence. They also brought up his involvement in the walk-out and threatened to resign should Nair be appointed. (Note: Nair was an independent member of the Assembly; when interviewed on this issue in November 1967, he only said that he had been asked to join the government by Marshall. He later joined the LF in 1956.) In September, Marshall replied that new ministers would be appointed, but that "it may not necessarily be these same men". Ultimately, the following month, three assistant ministers were appointed, namely Mak as assistant minister for labour and welfare; Tan Theng Chiang as assistant minister for local government, lands and housing; and Sidik as assistant minister for education.

Marshall later held preliminary talks with the British in December 1955, where it was decided that constitutional talks would take place in London the following year. They were held in April 1956, but ultimately broke down on 15 May, with Marshall resigning as chief minister as a result. Internal self-governance would later be granted in 1957, under his successor Lim Yew Hock's chief ministership.

== Legacy and assessment ==
The historian Yeo Kim Wah praised Marshall, stating that he had "deliberately created a crisis", with the historian John Drysdale calling it "Marshall's Machiavellian challenge" to the British. However, the academic James Low argued that, in spite of Yeo and Drysdale's statements which imply that Marshall had intended to create a crisis from the beginning, that he instead "[seized] the opportunity" when it arose. Low believed that Marshall had expected to be given the four assistant ministers. Marcus Ng of BiblioAsia wrote that the crisis "marshalled a united front against British intransigence", forcing the British "to agree to an accelerated timetable towards merdeka".

In his 2008 biography of Marshall, Tan described the crisis as "a political master stroke", as it allowed Marshall to question the Rendel Constitution's effectiveness, restrain the opposition within the LF, gain political initiative over the PAP regarding immediate self-governance, and display himself as an anti-colonialist. He further stated that the crisis revealed the British's preference to engage in politics by their own pace, as shown in their previous work with the PP. However, according to former governor Goode, Marshall's expediency opposed the British's intended pace, forcing them to respond more quickly to the people.

In Singapore: A Biography (2009), the authors Mark R. Frost and Yu-Mei Balasingamchow wrote that Marshall had "gambled on merdeka or bust" given that the British had to either show their intent to progress towards Singapore's independence, or continue to allow the governor to rule, which would have resulted in Marshall's resignation. They also described it as the kind of "typical individualism" that Marshall engaged in, having not consulted his fellow LF members about the decision. The historian Karl Hack described the crisis as "a moment of madness". The journalist and politician Vernon Bartlett, who was also a political commentator for The Straits Times, stated it was a "deliberately organised constitutional crisis".

Contemporary response to the crisis was mixed. Chinese-language newspaper Sin Chew Jit Poh argued that the salaries required for ten ministers would not exceed even S$1 million of the annual budget's S$200 million, and if the ministers performed well, the expenditure required would be negligible. Tamil-language newspaper Tamil Murasu believed that the "appointment of junior ministers is being contemplated to arrest the disunity within the Labour Front". Negative views focused on the expenses and the government becoming a "top-heavy administration". Chan stated that the crisis damaged Marshall's reputation in the English-language media, with The Singapore Free Press, The Straits Times, and Singapore Standard viewing him as vain and someone who mindlessly challenged the governor to gain publicity. The international press saw him as "honest but histrionic, unstable, impetuous, and inclined to promote crisis after crisis unnecessarily".

=== Analysis ===
Marshall's initial request for four junior ministers was done so because he believed that the governor acted on the chief minister's advice. Black's response that the choice of appointment ultimately fell on the governor regardless of the chief minister's views was correct, with Marshall's rebuttal focusing on his personal evaluation of the constitution. By reducing the governor's role to giving advice – along with the management of external affairs and defence – Marshall effectively interpreted that the constitution granted Singapore internal self-governance. However, according to Yeo, Marshall knew that his view of the constitution was wrong, and instead the constitutional crisis displayed the Marshall government's frequency to impinge on the colonial officials.

Low wrote that, due to ambiguities in the Rendel Constitution, Marshall was able to create the crisis; the role of chief minister had been modelled on the Westminster system's prime minister, yet worked under the governor. Black had attempted to end the crisis early by asking for the governor's discretionary powers to be removed, but Lennox-Boyd instead upheld the governor's powers and planned to meet with Marshall to postpone his resignation. Reports by the Colonial Office indicate that the British largely accepted Marshall's terms due to fear that his resignation would lead to further political crisis in Singapore, result in a more "radical and irresponsible government" coming into power, and undermine the confidence of the British's politics just three months after the 1955 general election. Black had reportedly sought to postpone Marshall's resignation until Lennox-Boyd's arrival to help manage these issues.

Lennox-Boyd personally did not hold much confidence in the LF and was displeased with the PP. He was also convinced that fresh elections or suspending the Rendel Constitution would have benefited the PAP. Therefore, Lennox-Boyd decided to reinforce the LF government by agreeing to Marshall's terms, due to the lack of viable successors.
