= Early life of David Marshall =

David Marshall
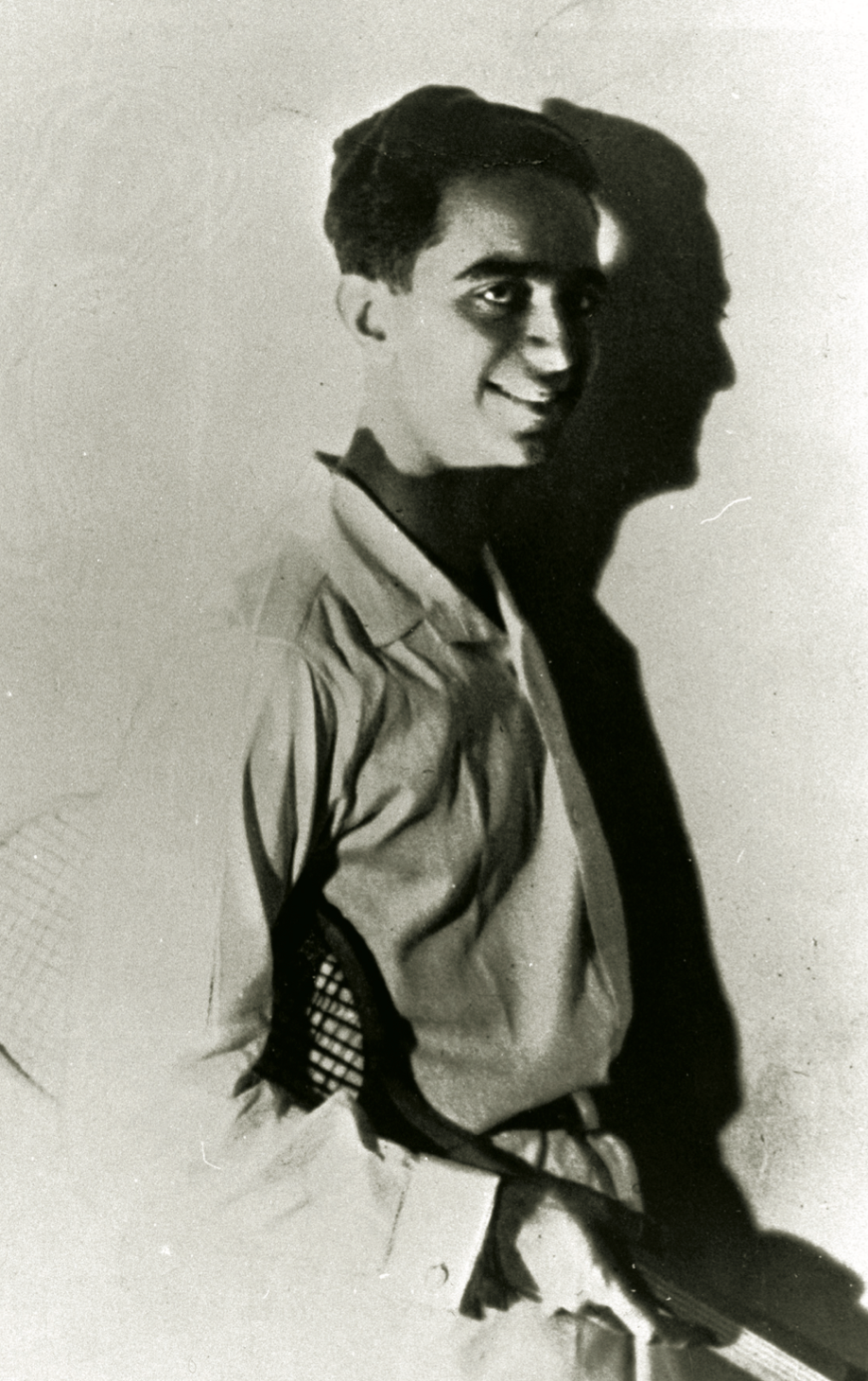
- Marshall in the 1920s
- Born: David Saul Mashal; 12 March 1908; Singapore, Straits Settlements (present-day Selegie Road, Singapore)
- Died: 12 December 1995 (aged 87); Singapore
- Occupations: Politician; lawyer; diplomat

The early life of Singaporean politician, lawyer, and diplomat David Marshall comprises the first 29 years of his life, from 1908 to 1937. The first chief minister of Singapore, Marshall was born to Jewish immigrant parents in British colonial Singapore on 12 March 1908, the second of seven children. Throughout his youth, he fell sick often and had a strict Jewish upbringing. He was interned at six-years-old in 1914 when he travelled to Baghdad and was arrested for having a British passport. Marshall returned to Singapore in 1917, where he attended kindergarten at the Convent of the Holy Infant Jesus at Victoria Street.

In 1918, he studied at Saint Joseph's Institution, but was expelled for skipping class. He then studied at Saint Andrew's Secondary School and later at Raffles Institution in 1923. He studied to attempt to win the Queen's Scholarship, but fell ill and was sent to Switzerland to recover. Marshall went on to study textile manufacturing in Renaix, Belgium, and returned to Singapore in 1927. During the Great Depression, he worked as a textile representative and later a salesman. He saved up money to study law in London and began studying at the University of London as an external student in 1934. Marshall came back to Singapore by June 1937 after completing his dinners with Middle Temple.

== Ancestry ==
=== Saul Nassim Mashal ===
David Marshall's father, Saul Nassim Mashal, was born in 1880 in Baghdad, Mesopotamia, the eldest of nine to Nissim Mashal (1853–1923) and Farha Sadka (1857–1937). Saul's family were merchants who sold dyed cloths. The family name of Mashal was Arabic for torch. According to family legend, the surname originated with Nissim Heskiel Mashal (1778–1848), the first known ancestor of the Mashals. He was so named due to a streak of red in his hair that bore a resemblance to a torch or beam of light. Saul's father, Nissim Mashal, and his grandfather, Za'aroor Yona, were both born in Baghdad; beyond Za'aroor, Marshall's male line of ancestry is unknown. Za'aroor was probably born around the beginning of the 1800s and his occupation is unknown. He married Hannah Mashal (1815–1891), and together they had four children, Jonathan (1850–1948), Nissim, Eliahoo (1859–1925), and Habiba (1862–1892). Among their four children, Nissim was the only one to take his mother's surname of Mashal. Hannah was the only daughter and youngest child of Nissim Heskiel Mashal.

Saul was known to have studied for a year in schools created by the Alliance Israélite Universelle (AIU). Saul arrived in British colonial Singapore in 1900 around Ramadan to recover from jaundice, but sensed economical success in Singapore and set up a business; he had been inspired by businessman Manasseh Meyer's own trips to Singapore. His business was located in Change Alley, where he sold goods from the Middle East and India. At the time, he spoke Arabic, Turkish, and French, later picking up "fluent if accented English". With business going well, he decided to stay in Singapore and soon brought his wife Flora over, having left her in Baghdad. They had married two years prior. The academic Chan Heng Chee describes Saul as a "tall, well-built man [who] was an unusual combination of business dynamism and a reticence." In later years, Saul and Flora would separate, and Saul later died in 1953 in Sydney, Australia.

=== Flora Ezekiel Mashal ===
Marshall's mother, Flora Ezekiel Mashal (died 1948; born Mariam Farha Khan), is considered by the author Kevin Y. L. Tan to have a "rather mysterious past". Tan suggests that her father was named Khan, while Chan in her biography of Marshall states that her father was named Gahtan. According to Chan, Flora came from Isfahan, Persia (present-day Iran). Flora's stepmother was described as "a tall and beautiful lady with blue eyes" by Chan, based on an interview with Marshall. Family legend states that when Flora's stepmother gave birth to her first son, so did the Queen of the royal house of Persia. As the Queen was unable to breast-feed her son, the Crown Prince, Flora's stepmother served as his wet nurse. When the Crown Prince reached adulthood, he gave his wet nurse two 30-carat emeralds in a silk bag. In Chan's interpretation, she believes that Flora's stepmother could have served as the wet nurse to any male offspring of the royal family, not necessarily being the Crown Prince. If Flora's stepmother had given birth to her son around the close of the 1800s, then the Crown Prince would have been Ahmad Shah Qajar, who was born on 21 January 1898. However, this story remains unverified.

Flora's father, either Khan or Gahtan, was said to have been a bullion trader based in Isfahan. In 1889, the Imperial Bank of Persia was established and given by the Shah of Iran Naser al-Din Shah Qajar to entrepreneur Paul Reuter to manage. The bank issued the first paper currency, but faced struggles as its notes were circulated slowly due to "dealing houses" drawing large sums from their banks and converting the notes into gold and silver. According to Marshall, relating this story to the historian and rabbi Louis Rabinowitz, this led to bullion traders making large profits which threatened to destabilise the economy. This led to eight traders being arrested, among them being Flora's father. The other seven were made to drown in a river, but Flora's father was spared as his wife was recognised as a former wet nurse to the Crown Prince. Therefore, he left to Iraq after being given four hours to do so. Rabinowitz states that this story by Marshall was relating to his paternal grandfather, not his maternal, however Tan notes that Rabinowitz was incorrect in this assumption. Flora's father was known to have escaped to Baghdad, where he continued a successful career.

Flora had an elementary education at AIU schools in Baghdad, studying for a year. She had managed to attend school as she came from a prosperous family, with most girls not receiving schooling at the time. She arrived in Singapore shortly after her husband Saul had settled down there, being accompanied by a shoehet on her trip. Flora and Saul would separate, and she died in 1948 in Israel.

== Childhood ==
Upon Flora's arrival, the Mashals began their family. Their first child was Victoria Rachel, who was born in 1907. Tan states she died young from an illness in 1919 or 1920, with Chan writing that it was from a "fatal fever". David Saul Mashal, their second child, was born on 12 March 1908 at 81 Selegie Road, a shophouse; below them was a Chinese business that sold coffins. He was named after the biblical figure David. Following Marshall were his siblings Rose (1909–1963), George (1911–1945), Samuel (born 1913), (Note: Also known as "Sonny".) Meyer, and Rothschild. (Note: Also known as "Reginald" or "Reggie".) Tan suggests that there could have been another son who was born in Baghdad sometime in 1920, but died in his infancy from measles.

In his youth, Marshall lived in a two-storey terrace house at Sophia Road, which was generally a middle-class neighbourhood. Saul was known to have moved the family frequently depending on his fluctuating wealth, and he also engaged in selling properties. The Mashals would move to Wilkie Road, then to houses in Marine Parade, Sea Avenue, and Chapel Road. In 1920, the Mashals anglicised their surname to Marshall at the advice of a family doctor, Sir David Galloway. Saul's brother's family, who were living in England, had similarly changed their surname to Marshall. He recalled in a 1984 interview that:

I was in bed with my usual bout of malaria, five days every 40 days. And I remember Sir David Galloway, our doctor, a florid Englishman with a monocle to his eye, saying, "I can't pronounce this outlandish name. Why don't you anglicise it, man? Why don't you anglicise it?" And my poor humble father saying, "How do you anglicise it?" "Put an 'r' in it man. Put an 'r' in it." So from 'Mashal' which means a torch, it became 'Marshall'.

=== World War I ===
In 1914, Flora had wanted to return to Baghdad after fourteen years of living in Singapore to see her parents and seek out a physician as she had been ill at the time. She brought along her two eldest sons, Marshall and George, and a Chinese amah, Ah See Kah. Upon their arrival however, they were detained by the Turks for holding British passports, as this was during the Mesopotamian campaign. They were then placed under house arrest, where they alternated living between David's maternal and paternal grandparents' homes. During their stay, they had been encouraged by the British to leave Baghdad via ships leaving Mesopotamia. However, these ships were full and they would have to sleep on the decks, which Flora refused to do so. Therefore, they stayed in Baghdad for the next three years, until the British liberated Baghdad in 1917.

In Baghdad, the Turkish authorities were lax in law enforcement, with David's maternal grandfather frequently bribing officials. Tan believes this is when Marshall picked up malaria, which would affect him later in Singapore. Restricted to town, Marshall played in the streets and attended kindergarten, where he learnt Hebrew and Arabic. Upon British liberation, the Mashals returned to Singapore. When Marshall returned to Singapore, the family was living in a shophouse at Adis Road, which was an area considered more upper class.

=== Religion ===
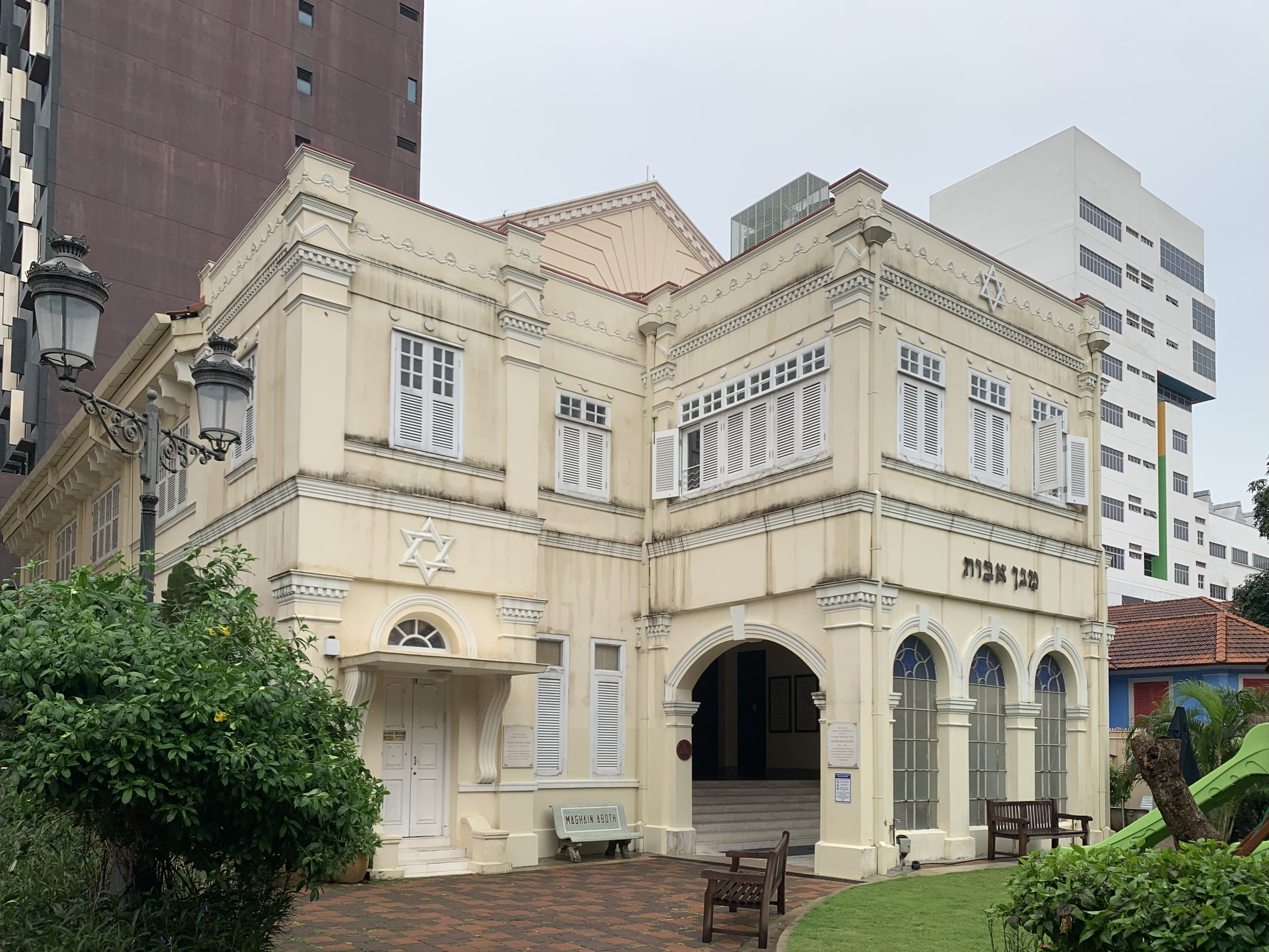
Marshall went to the Maghain Aboth Synagogue (pictured) in his youth.

Flora was a deeply religious individual, with her devotion stated to have later estranged her from the family. She was from a sadik family and was more faithful and devoted as compared to Saul. The historian Melanie Chew in Leaders of Singapore described his parents as ultra-orthodox Jews. Marshall received a religious education at the Talmud Torah Hebrew School, which was located at Bencoolen Street behind the Maghain Aboth Synagogue, where he was taught Hebrew for an hour every week. He also was taught the Old Testament in Hebrew. Additionally, he frequently went to the synagogue and observed the Sabbath. Marshall had his bar mitzvah when he was thirteen-years-old.

It was around this age where he began to question his religious practices, regarding it as "hypocrisy and illogicality". For example, he did not understand why, as the Jewish could not handle money on Saturdays, that instructing their driver to do so on their behalf was allowed. They were also not allowed to use light switches, as it would have been touching fire on the Sabbath, yet it was fine for their servant to do so for them. By fourteen-years-old, Marshall had stopped conforming with Judaism and religion as a whole. Regardless of this, Marshall continued to be involved with the Jewish community in later years and considered himself a Jew despite not following Jewish practices.

== Education ==
=== Convent of the Holy Infant Jesus ===
Upon David's return from Baghdad in 1917, his parents sought to enrol him in school as he was two years behind his cohort and illiterate in English. They did not focus so much on the type of education their children received, more so that their children were enrolled in schools. He rarely received acknowledgement from his parents for academic prizes. Flora had initially sought out schools similar to that of the AIU, but was unsuccessful. She then sent Marshall to the kindergarten run by the Catholic nuns at the Convent of the Holy Infant Jesus by Victoria Street. He spent a short time at the Convent kindergarten, having moved to St. Joseph's Institution (SJI) by 1918.

On his first day, he received racist and anti-Semitic remarks, with a classmate stating "Jaudi Jew, brush my shoe, bring it back at half-past-two." Marshall punched this classmate in the face and was punished by a nun when he did not express remorse or apologise for his actions.

=== St. Joseph's Institution ===
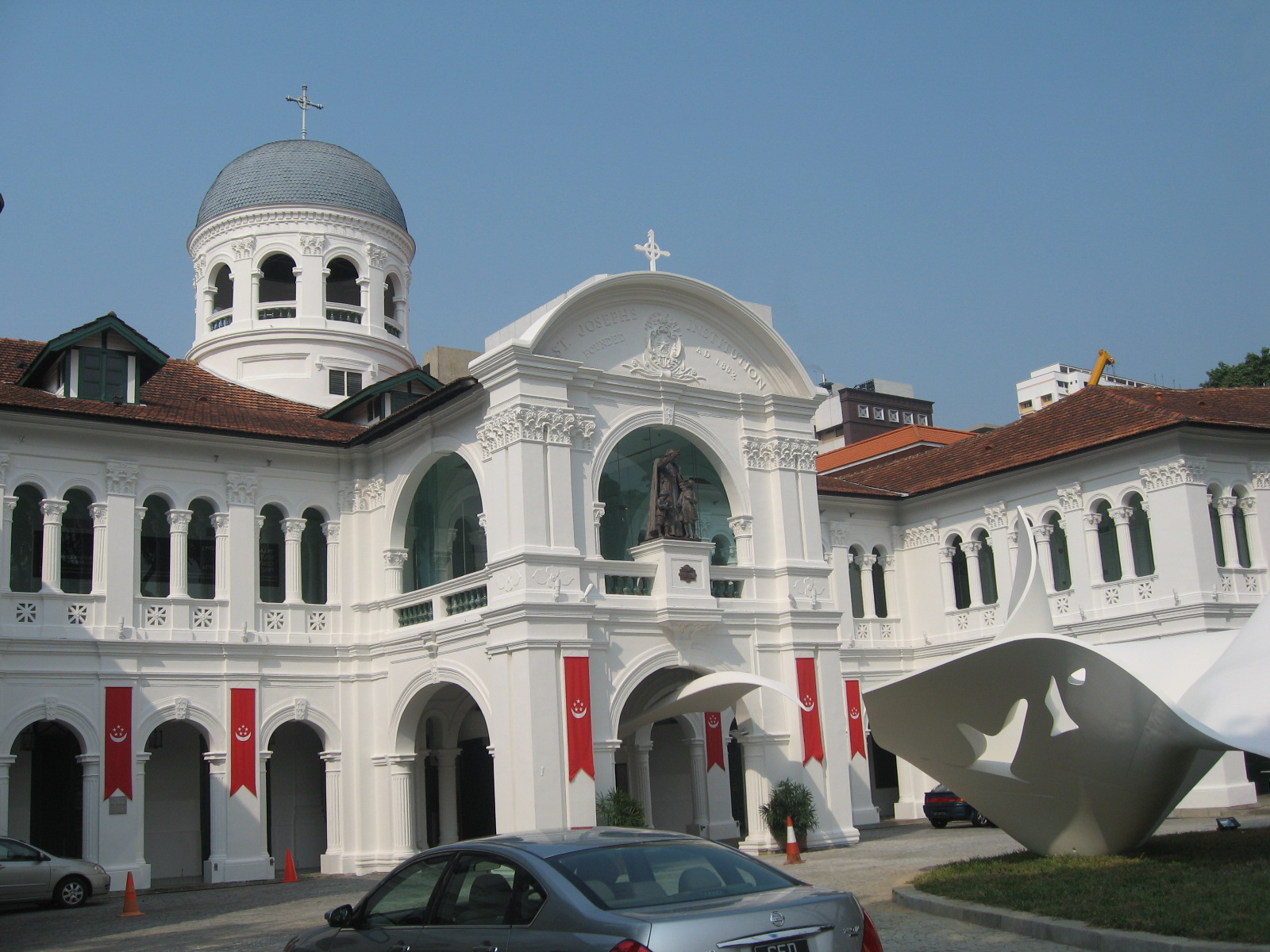
Marshall attended St. Joseph's Institution (pictured) from 1918 to 1919.

He was enrolled at SJI in 1918, the brother school of the Convent. SJI was a popular school at the time, especially amongst the Eurasian–Catholic community. At SJI, he was put into Standard II – the fourth year of formal education – despite having only attended a few months of kindergarten prior. During catechism classes or chapel sessions, Marshall was among those excluded and was made to study ethics instead. Marshall used to walk to school, but when Saul moved them to Sea Avenue in 1918, he was unable to continue doing so, and began being sent to school via carriage; this was common practice amongst other rich Jewish families at the time.

Marshall was considered intelligent, and he reached Standard III by 1919. He enjoyed reading American novels such as Buffalo Bill. He was regularly afflicted by the malaria that he had contracted in Baghdad, hiding his illness from both his parents and teachers. In 1919, Marshall was expelled from SJI. He had skipped class to go to the synagogue on Yom Kippur, the holiest day in Judaism, and told brother-director Stephen Buckley in advance, who had not allowed him to do so. Regardless, he skipped class for Yom Kippur, which resulted in his expulsion. In later years, Marshall considered this another act of racism, although Tan interpreted it differently. At the time, SJI had been under pressure to accept more students while already succeeding capacity, with Tan explaining that whether Buckley expelled Marshall for opportunistic or prejudiced reasons is unknown, though Buckley made no other actions that could be considered "racist" during his time with SJI.

Furthermore, Tan suggests that it was not Yom Kippur, and instead Rosh Hashanah, the new year in Judaism. In 1919, Yom Kippur fell on 4 October, a Saturday, therefore negating the need to skip school. On the other hand, Rosh Hashanah was on 25 September, a Thursday, and Tan considers this date to better align with Marshall's experiences.

=== Saint Andrew's Secondary School ===
Following his expulsion, Marshall's parents were surprised, but did not hold any punishment against him as he was following Jewish practices. Flora soon began searching for a school to enrol Marshall in and met with Saint Andrew's Secondary School's principal, James Romanis Lee. As there was only a vacancy in a Standard IV class, Flora convinced Lee that Marshall was an intelligent student and would be able to catch up, despite not having completed his Standard III yet. Lee agreed and Marshall began studying at Saint Andrew's.

During his time at Saint Andrew's, Marshall performed well in religious studies, literature, history, and English. He was once again punished when he fought an American student who teased a Chinese student by calling him "Ching Ching Chinaman". At some point, possibly 1920, he moved to a boarding house named Oldham Hall, that was located at Oldham Lane, as his parents were on holiday in Baghdad. This was also when he began rebelling from his religion, and living at Oldham Hall granted him a larger degree of independence from his parents and their influence. By 1922, Marshall decided he wanted to study science and become a doctor, but Saint Andrew's did not provide the necessary equipment to do so. The only school at the time that offered such services was Raffles Institution (RI), so Marshall worked to transfer to them.

=== Raffles Institution ===
Marshall transferred to RI in 1923, when he reached Standard VII. He was a house prefect at RI and was in charge of House No. 2, where he was regarded as strict by fellow prefect Goh Sin Ee, describing him in an interview. Marshall was also actively involved with the Literary and Debating Society, which was established in 1922. It later merged with the Musical and Dramatic Society to become the Literary and Dramatic Society in January 1925. He participated in annual debates held between students and teachers with the society, but had his prefect badge removed after an incident when he insulted a teacher during a debate. It occurred in either 1922 or 1923, but Marshall was restored as a prefect by 1924. He was also involved with RI's school magazine, The Rafflesian, and wrote an article in its inaugural 1924 issue.

He was known to be hardworking, being described in a 1925 Rafflesian issue as "a very interesting specimen who has been continuously working since he first saw daylight, and is now, like Johnny Walker [sic], still going strong". (Note: This references the Scottish whiskey brand's tagline at the time: "Johnny Walker, Born 1820 – Still Going Strong".) A source of his motivation towards studying was his family's finances, as, in 1922, Saul's profits were affected by the 1920 economic crash, leading Marshall to worry if his family would be able to fund an overseas education at a university. He wanted to go to England and therefore aimed to achieve a Queen's Scholarship. He completed his Junior Cambridge Certificate with honours and had been awarded a Junior Scholarship for his academic achievement, though failed to acquire the Queen's Scholarship in 1924.

In December 1924, he passed his Senior Cambridge School Certificate with honours and a distinction in English. In 1925, he continued his studying for the Queen's Scholarship, and kept to a fourteen-hour study schedule for eight months straight. On weekends, Marshall studied bookkeeping, typewriting, and shorthand at the YMCA School of Commerce. Such a schedule was not sustainable, and four months (Note: Chan states that Marshall "collapsed on the eve of the scholarship examination" while Marshall himself said it was "six weeks before the exam" in an interview.) before the Queen's Scholarship examinations, he fainted and was sent to the hospital by a doctor named Roltray. After several weeks at the hospital, Marshall told Roltray that he had to leave to study, to which Roltray stated that "if you are determined to go on with your studies, you [should] give thought to preparing a suitable epitaph for yourself."

Roltray diagnosed Marshall with tuberculosis and said that he would have five years left to live if he remained in Singapore. He then advised Saul to send Marshall to Switzerland for treatment. (Note: At that time, treatment for tuberculosis was to send the afflicted to a sanatorium, with Switzerland preferred due to its "fresh mountain air".) Marshall officially left RI on 17 July 1925, with principal David A. Bishop describing him on his leaving certificate as "a very promising student".

=== YMCA ===
Marshall additionally studied externally at the YMCA in Singapore. He had been a junior member since either 1920 or 1921, and studied subjects such as bookkeeping, shorthand, and typewriting in the event that he did not achieve the Queen's Scholarship; instead, he would be able to enter commerce. In 1924, with YMCA, he got a Junior Commercial Education Certificate from the London Chamber of Commerce (LCC(I)) after passing bookkeeping with distinctions. He then passed stage S2 of bookkeeping, with first class honours, from the Union of Educational Institutions in England. In 1925, Marshall attained a certificate in proficiency and distinction in bookkeeping and accountancy from the LCC(I), along with a first class certificate in advanced bookkeeping from the Institute of Commerce Limited. Marshall provided bookkeeping as a subject in his Junior and Senior Cambridge examinations.

== Illness and early employment ==
Marshall travelled to Switzerland with Saul by August 1925, where he stayed in a boarding house called Pro Juventas. While recovering, he studied French and German over the ten months (Note: Chan says he spent nine months in a sanatorium.) he spent there. Marshall returned to Singapore in 1926, where his father's business had since stabilised following the economic crash. After missing out on the Queen's Scholarship, Marshall began working to save money for a university education, now eighteen-years-old. His first job was for the stockbroking firm E. A. Brown & Company, as he was interested in learning about stockbroking. Tan states that Marshall does not recall much from this period, except that he was successful, as he soon fell sick again with tuberculosis.

When a child, I had believed that God was white and the British were his special agents. I thought that as Asians, it was privilege to eat off the crumbs of their table. But while on board a ship to Switzerland [...] I suddenly came across the concept that all men are equal. It's not the never never, in heaven, but here, on earth, today. That was an explosive introduction to a different form of life.

— David Marshall, (Kahlenberg 1988, p. 23, cited in Tan 2008, p. 48)

Chan attributes this period of his life to have been when Marshall developed his anti-colonialist views. In 1927, he delivered a speech at the YMCA titled "Who Is Responsible for this Cesspool?", in response to a The Straits Times report that a British parliamentarian had described Singapore as a "pestilential and immoral cesspool". This led to Marshall being banned from public speaking at schools by the Department of Education.

By 1928, he went to Obersee, Arosa, in Switzerland to recover again. Marshall spent eight months there and studied French literature in his free time. Afterwards, he travelled to Belgium and attended the Ecole Pigier in Brussels, where he received a typewriting certificate in May 1929. Marshall then began studying the French system of Prevost–Delauney shorthand, in addition to the Pitman shorthand he learnt in Singapore, however he found it confusing and stopped. Marshall then travelled to Renaix to study textile manufacturing, with the aim of becoming a textile representative for his uncle Frank Iny (Note: Chan instead states that he wanted to become a textile representative for the Meyer Brothers.) (1893–1976) in Singapore. Marshall returned to Singapore by 1930, during the Great Depression.

The Great Depression severely affected Marshall's family's wealth; his brothers were refused treatment from doctors as they already owed them S$400.00. His plans of becoming a textile representative broke down due to the recession, and Marshall instead found a job with N. V. Straits Java Trading Company as an assistant. His role involved liquidating departments of the company. He left N. V. Straits Java after they cut employee salaries' by ten percent, and joined Sternberg and Company as a salesman. With Sternberg, he was described as a "whacking success as a salesman", earning around S$150.00 a month.

Marshall also continued studying French, and scored a distinction in written and oral French after taking his LCC(I) Senior Commercial Education Certificate examinations in 1931. He was registered as a French teacher at the YMCA on 3 February 1932, and held night classes for S$60.00 monthly. As part of his goal in undertaking a medical education, he began studying Latin as it was required and took his Cambridge School Certificate examinations in Latin, French, and spoken French in December 1933, which he passed with credits. In March 1932, Marshall joined French shipping firm Compagnie des Messageries Maritimes after they offered him a larger monthly salary of S$175.00 as compared to the S$150.00 he was earning with Sternberg. With Messageries Maritimes, he worked as a secretary for their passenger department.

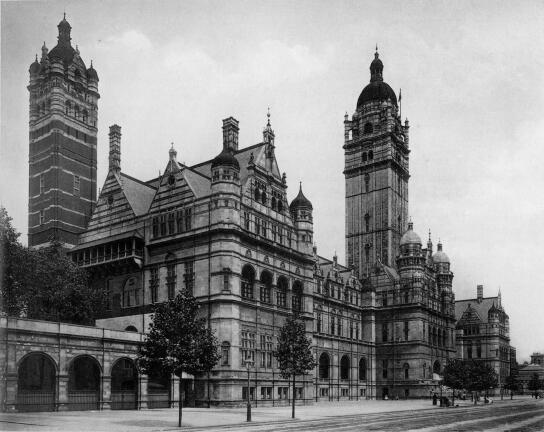
Marshall studied at the University of London (pictured) from 1934 to 1936.

By 1934, he saved up £350 (equivalent to £21,658 in 2025). He subsequently resigned from Messageries Maritimes and bought a ticket for the MM Felix Roussel. At the time, Marshall had decided he wanted to specialise in psychiatry, but a university course in medicine would have taken five years with an additional housemanship year and been costly. Therefore, he instead chose to study law, planning to take his Bachelor of Laws degree of the University of London (UoL) externally while simultaneously completing his Bar studies with Middle Temple. Such a schedule would allow him to complete his studies within eighteen months and he departed for London on 24 July 1934.

In her biography of him, Chan wrote that Marshall could have achieved his medical education in Singapore at the King Edward VII College of Medicine, where he could have gotten a medical degree. Tan agreed with her in his biography, where he similarly stated that Marshall did not attempt to study science at Raffles College either. This would have allowed him to qualify for a diploma and finish his degree within a year in England. Tan concludes that Marshall was keen on going to England as he was motivated from prejudice towards Asians and Jews at the time.

=== Work with the Jewish community ===
Marshall returned to Singapore the year that Manasseh Meyer, the leader of the Jewish community, died. Meyer's leadership role was filled by his daughter, Mozelle Nissim (1883–1975). Nissim established the Singapore Jewish Women's League in 1929, which worked with the Women's International Zionist Organization. Marshall knew Nissim through her work with the League and offered his support by teaching French classes at her mansion, donating the money generated back to the League. In 1934, he formed a group called The Optimists to create a magazine for the Jewish community titled Israelight. They published their first issue on 1 March 1934, where Marshall wrote an article titled "Antics of Hatred", in which he criticised an anti-Jewish German pamphlet and the poet Alain Grandbois's "Destiny of Israel".

However, by the time the second issue of their first volume was published, Marshall was leaving to London. He wrote a farewell piece titled "Adieu", where he stated his regret in having to leave shortly after establishing Israelight. The magazine lasted until 1937, where Marshall contributed two more articles under the pen name "Mars" in August 1935 and December 1937, respectively.

== Overseas education in London ==
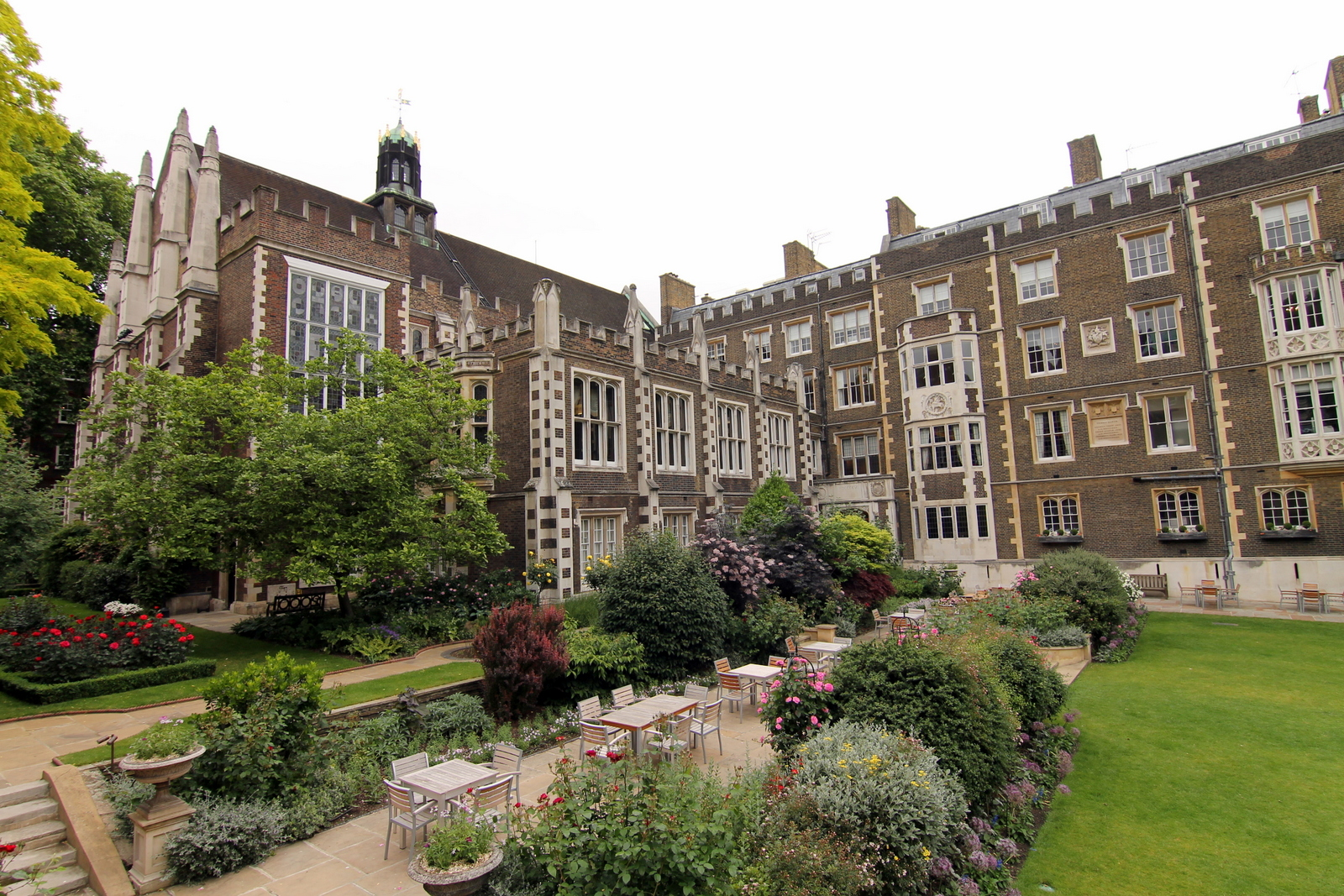
The Middle Temple Hall, where Marshall partook in required dinners

Marshall arrived in London in September 1934. He visited the Solomons, who were old friends of his, at their residence in the Jewish-dominated neighbourhood of Golders Green; he lived nearby the Solomons' residence. Marshall originally paid rent of 21 shillings weekly which included breakfast, but reduced it to 18 shillings when he decided to eat with the Solomons instead in an effort to save money, as his father could only afford to send him £10 (equivalent to £618.79 in 2025) weekly. Marshall frequently struggled with finding lodgings as he faced racial discrimination and anti-semitism. He also worked odd jobs such as teaching chess or joining the police force, but was unsuccessful in those ventures.

He chose to enrol with the UoL as an external student due to his lack of funds, although he could have sat for his Bar course with one of the Inns of Court without attending a university as it was possible back then to become a lawyer without a university degree in law; UoL offered external programmes for students to attend higher education even if they suffered from issues such as financial issues, work, or family commitments. After joining UoL's external programme, Marshall decided he wanted admission with Middle Temple and wrote to its under treasurer Thomas Frank Hewlett. Marshall was admitted on 4 October 1934.

Initially, he studied law by attending lectures held by the Council of Legal Education, but stopped after finding them uninteresting. Marshall studied for two hours daily at the Middle Temple Library, increasing the time by 30 minutes every week until he was studying daily for eleven hours. During this period, he also courted Rose Solomon, whom he considered himself "semi-engaged" to, and partook in events with the Maccabees, a sports-focused youth group for Jews. In November 1935, Marshall took his intermediate LLB examinations, which he successfully cleared, and took his Bar finals in April 1936. He learnt of his Bar results in The Morning Post, where he passed with honours.

He intended to return to Singapore to begin working and practicing law, however, he had not met his required number of dinners (Note: Eating dinners, also known as "qualifying sessions", is a tradition carried out at the Inns of Courts, including Middle Temple. They were considered "formal and informal affairs", with students dining in groups of four.) with Middle Temple; Marshall also planned to take his UoL examinations in Singapore since he was an external student. He met with Hewlett to discuss an exemption from participating in eighteen months' worth of dinners, but was only exempted of six months. During the one year period of participating in dinners, Marshall decided to read in the chambers of Walter Raeburn. Tan suggests that Marshall gained the opportunity to meet Raeburn either by meeting him in Middle Temple or because they lived nearby.

Marshall returned to Singapore in 1937, though it is unknown specifically when; it is also unknown when he took his final examinations with UoL. He finished his pupillage with Raeburn by January 1937, and Chan states that he returned in February. Tan disputes this, however, as Marshall would have completed his required dinners around April 1937. Nevertheless, Marshall had left the United Kingdom by June 1937. He was called to the bar on 9 June 1937 and received his LLB degree from UoL on 21 July.
