= Chief ministership of David Marshall =

Government of Singapore from 1955 to 1956

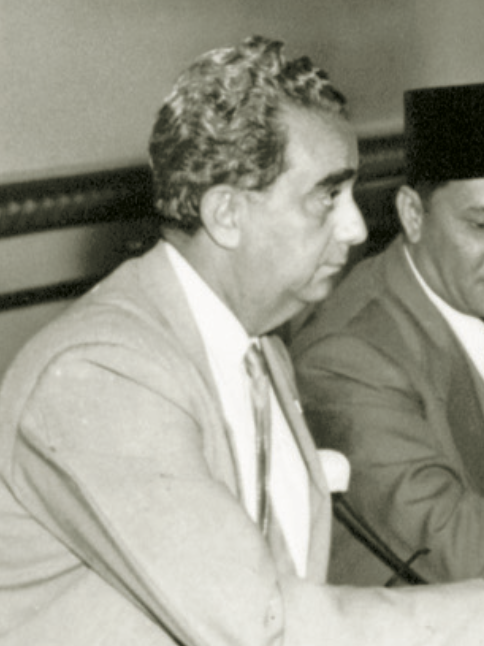
- Marshall at the 1956 constitutional talks in London
- Chief ministership of David Marshall; 7 April 1955 – 7 June 1956
- Monarch: Elizabeth II
- Governor: John Nicoll; Robin Black
- Cabinet: Marshall I
- Party: Labour Front–Singapore Malay National Organisation–Malayan Chinese Association coalition
- Election: 1955 general election
- Constituency: Cairnhill

David Marshall's tenure as the 1st chief minister of Singapore began on 7 April 1955 and ended on 7 June 1956, following his resignation. Marshall, a lawyer of Jewish descent, had his start in politics with the Progressive Party. He later founded the Labour Front (LF) to contest in the upcoming 1955 general election, where they ended up winning the most seats with ten, leading to him being named the first chief minister as the LF's leader. Marshall created his minority government after forming a coalition with the Singapore United Malay National Organisation (SUMNO)–Malayan Chinese Association (MCA) alliance. He was known for his anti-colonial views and progress in attaining self-governance for Singapore.

Early in his chief ministership, Marshall dealt with strikes and riots, and he worked to remove the Emergency Regulations, which the LF had promised to address in their 1955 election campaign. He became involved in a constitutional crisis in July 1955, following disagreements with Governor Robert Black on the Rendel Constitution, that escalated with him threatening resignation. His demands were eventually met following meetings with Secretary of State for the Colonies Alan Lennox-Boyd, where Marshall was granted more power as the chief minister over the governor. He further addressed issues pertaining to education, citizenship, and the civil service, and improved trade relations between Singapore and Indonesia.

Apart from his successes, Marshall's chief ministership was also marked with internal conflicts. The LF was plagued with issues when they held office, and a publicised feud between him and LF assemblymen A. R. Lazarous and Lee Choon Eng led to them leaving the LF and joining the opposition, severely affecting the LF's majority over the opposition. Marshall also faced criticism for his actions in dealing with the Hock Lee bus riots and the Chinese school sit-ins, as he was considered to have been lax in giving punishment and instead agreed to the strikers' terms. External opinions of his government include the British, who tolerated Marshall while he was in office and accommodated him when he threatened resignation in fear of a more volatile government succeeding his. The Australian government largely held the same position as the British, as they believed that his government was too unstable for self-governance to be granted.

In 1956, the Marshall government sent a delegation to London to discuss the self-governance for Singapore, with a planned date of self-governance by April 1957. The British rejected Marshall's plan and gave counteroffers themselves which would have granted Singapore slight self-governance, but Marshall refused them. The constitutional talks subsequently broke down on 15 May. Marshall resigned as chief minister on 7 June 1956, having promised that he would do so if he did not obtain self-governance. He remained as a backbencher, and was succeeded by Lim Yew Hock as chief minister. Scholarly analysis gives both praise and criticism to his government, while studies using contemporary newspapers show that he generally received support from the Chinese community.

== 1955 general election ==
=== Background ===
David Marshall was born in Singapore under British rule to Jewish parents on 12 March 1908. He studied law in the United Kingdom at the University of London and was called to the bar in 1937. After World War II, he entered politics and joined the Progressive Party (PP). Marshall later founded the Labour Front (LF) to contest in the 1955 general elections. The 1955 general elections came following the 1954 Rendel Constitution, which would elect 25 out of 32 members via popular vote to the Legislative Assembly.

=== Campaign and results ===
Seats won per party
1. 10 seats (LF) (40.0%)
2. 4 seats (PP) (16.0%)
3. 3 seats (PAP) (12.0%)
4. 3 seats (Independents) (12.0%)
5. 2 seats (DP) (8.00%)
6. 1 seat (MU) (4.00%)
7. 1 seat (MCA) (4.00%)
8. 1 seat (SUMNO) (4.00%)

The 1955 election's nomination day was on 28 February, and the LF fielded 17 out of the 79 candidates participating in the election; the other parties included the PP, the People's Action Party (PAP), the Democratic Party (DP), the Singapore Malay National Organisation (SUMNO)–Malay Union (MU)–Malayan Chinese Association (MCA) alliance, the Labour Party, and 10 independents. Marshall chose to specifically contest in PP leader Tan Chye Cheng's constituency (Cairnhill) as he wanted to confront his and the PP's views, which was shown in his speeches where he frequently spoke of self-governance and anti-colonialism. Throughout his campaign, his opponents brought up his previous affiliations and views on income tax and land, to which he stated did not reflect his current, more socialist views. (Note: According to his biographer Chan Heng Chee, Marshall previously held more conservative views that went against socialism due to his affiliations with the Singapore Association and Singapore Ratepayers' Association.)

Despite the PAP and LF not having agreed with each other earlier, the two parties had a mutual understanding of not fielding candidates in each other's constituencies. The PAP themselves stated that, in constituencies with none of their candidates, the vote should go to the LF. Marshall later stated on the PAP's self-governance views that it was "impractical though desirable", with their need for self-governance "going a little too fast". During the campaign period, The Singapore Free Press described Cairnhill Constituency as where "high political issues [were] on trial", with Marshall, PP's Tan Chye Cheng, and DP's Tan Khiang Khoo all contesting there. Marshall held several rallies at Empress Place, along with visiting local constituents. He also frequently challenged Tan Chye Cheng to debates.

At the time, the PP was largely expected to win the election – even by Marshall himself – with Tan assumed to become the first chief minister. Therefore, Marshall contesting against Tan came as a surprise to many, including senior government officials. Marshall described it as "David versus the Goliath of Big Business", and blamed the PP for the slow progress towards Singapore's independence. Marshall's speeches were described by historian John Drysdale as including "thunderous language, a flamboyant style, and a silver tongue", while The Straits Times mentioned his "sensational" speech on the "social injustices of colonialism" and the "near-erupting volcano of impatient youth thirsting for independence".

The results of the election were announced on 3 April, with the LF winning the most seats with 10. The PP performed poorly, with 18 of their 22 candidates being unsuccessful, including Tan. Although the LF won the majority of seats, the PAP's Lee Kuan Yew won the largest majority in a constituency. The results surprised Marshall and Lee and Tan congratulated him. As the LF's leader, he became the first chief minister, and Lee pledged cooperation with his government. In Cairnhill, Marshall was elected with 3,305 votes as compared to Tan Chye Cheng's 2,530 and Tan Khiang Khoo's 1,111. The results of the election also surprised Governor John Nicoll, who had speculated that the pro-British PP would have won ten seats, with five seats each for the remaining parties.

== Administration ==
Marshall cabinet
Office	Name	Party	Term
Chief Minister	David Marshall	LF	1955–1956
Ministry of Commerce and Industry (Note: Marshall originally held both the role of chief minister and commerce minister, but in 1956, it was given to J. M. Jumabhoy so that he could focus on his work as chief minister. Jumabhoy had previously served as the assistant commerce minister from 1955 to 1956.)	David Marshall	LF	1955–1956
J. M. Jumabhoy	LF	1956
Ministry of Local Government, Lands and Housing	Abdul Hamid Jumat	SUMNO	1955–1956
Ministry of Health	A. J. Braga	LF	1955–1956
Ministry of Communications and Works	Francis Thomas	LF	1955–1956
Ministry of Labour and Welfare	Lim Yew Hock	LF	1955–1956
Ministry of Education	Chew Swee Kee	LF	1955–1956
Chief Secretary	William Goode	Independent	1955–1956
Attorney-General (Note: Davies was replaced by Charles Harris Butterfield on 6 September 1955 as he had to serve as Chief Justice of Tanganyika; Butterfield served the rest of Davies' term.)	E. J. Davies	Independent	1955
Charles Harris Butterfield	Independent	1955–1956
Financial Secretary	T. M. Hart	Independent	1955–1956

Following the LF's minor majority of 10 of the 25 seats in the Legislative Assembly, Marshall set up his minority government as the chief minister. The evening after their win, the LF met up in Marshall's home to discuss forming a coalition with the other parties; Marshall wanted Abdul Hamid Jumat of the SUMNO to be included, as it would display Malay representation in his cabinet. The LF wanted to form a coalition with either the PAP or the SUMNO–MU–MCA alliance as their minority government of 10 seats could be easily deterred in the larger 32 total seats of the Assembly. As Marshall continued talks with Abdul, his cabinet began to take shape, but during a meeting with Nicoll on 4 April, he stated that even if he got the SUMNO–MU–MCA alliance to join a coalition with them, they would still not obtain a majority in the Assembly. To increase the LF's representation, Marshall requested Nicoll allow him four LF nominees under the Rendel Constitution, but Nicoll refused as it would show that any minority government could rule. Instead, Nicoll appointed two LF executive committee members – Francis Thomas and R. C. H. Lim – and two non-partisans – G. A. P. Sutherland and Ong Piah Teng – to the Assembly. Sutherland and Ong represented European and Chinese commercial interests, respectively.

On 5 April, the LF successfully reached an agreement to form a coalition with the SUMNO's Abdul and MCA's Wong Foo Nam, although the MU withdrew; Marshall had only managed to get their support after Nicoll appointed the two LF members. For his cabinet, Marshall was required to include three colonial officials for the roles of chief secretary, financial secretary, and attorney-general, which were given to William Goode, T. M. Hart, and E. J. Davies, respectively. The rest of his cabinet included Marshall as the chief minister and commerce and industry minister, Chew Swee Kee as the education minister, Lim Yew Hock as the labour and welfare minister, A. J. Braga as the health minister, Thomas as the communications and works minister, Abdul as the local government, lands and housing minister, and J. M. Jumabhoy as the assistant commerce and industry minister. Chew's appointment as education minister was seen as unexpected, as he was a first-time politician and Thomas appeared the more likely choice due to his background in education, but Marshall believed that the education minister should be Chinese given the recent issues with Chinese schools and students. Marshall also maintained diversity in his cabinet as he wanted multi-racialism and equality to be shown. He officially unveiled his cabinet on 7 April at Empress Place, and Nicoll swore them in. Thomas's appointment as communications and works minister was unpopular, as he was one of three executive committee members who had previously pledged to not take office. Furthermore, Marshall did not have confidence in the Malay assemblymen of their alliance government, as he believed they had larger allegiance to the Federation of Malaya's UMNO instead of with the Singapore government.

== Domestic affairs ==
=== Relations with the British ===
In the early days of his chief ministership, Marshall did not maintain a good relationship with Nicoll, considering him to be "discourteous" and "arrogant". Additionally, he frequently went against both Nicoll and the British members of the Legislative Assembly. At the opening of the first Legislative Assembly on 22 April, he protested against them by arriving in a bush jacket, while Thomas wore a safari jacket and sandals. Due to Marshall's behaviour, Nicoll made his aide-de-camp take Marshall's speech written for the governor for him, instead of taking it himself per tradition. In another incident, Nicoll stated that he would use red ink to represent his final decision in documents, and that no one else was to use red. Following Nicoll's admission, Attorney-General E. J. Davies added that he himself would use green ink. Marshall, upset with this designation of specific colours, ignored Davies and thus stated that he would use green, with no one else allowed to use it; from then on, Marshall signed all his official documents in green ink.

Other issues Marshall faced was the lack of accommodation for the chief minister or other ministers, despite their positions in the Assembly. There was a lack of a chief minister's office, and he was instead asked to use the commerce minister's office due to his concurrent role serving as both. After he protested to the British officials that he would use a desk under the "old apple tree" at Empress Place if no proper office was made for him, they relented and made space in a room under the stairs of the Assembly House. There were further incidents such as when Marshall found himself placed seventh in line to the governor instead of second during public events, which went against the proper procedure; he would have it rectified. He also wrote letters to the chief secretary, demanding them to respect the Asian police officers of the Singapore Guard Regiment on duty at Government House. Such incidents occurred as Marshall and Nicoll had differing views of the chief minister's role. Nicoll assumed Marshall would mainly serve his role as the commerce minister and give important decisions to the duty of the governor and ex-officio ministers, while Marshall believed that the chief minister functioned similarly to that of a prime minister.

=== Civil unrest ===
==== Strikes and riots ====
In April, Hock Lee bus workers began strikes against the company, following disputes regarding the dismissals of union officials. He addressed the Hock Lee strikers at a 1 May rally, stating that the government would allow them the right to strike, but that they had to exercise this right responsibly. To form a peaceful agreement to end the riots, he met with three representatives of the Singapore Bus Workers' Union (SBWU): secretary-general Fong Swee Suan, legal adviser Lee Kuan Yew, and committee member Lim Chin Siong. As the riots began to escalate with the involvement of Chinese students, Marshall addressed them on 12 May via radio. On 14 May, he met with the SBWU, Hock Lee Amalgamated Bus Company, and the Hock Lee Employees' Union at Assembly House to discuss an end to the riots, announcing later that day that an agreement had been reached between the government and affected parties.

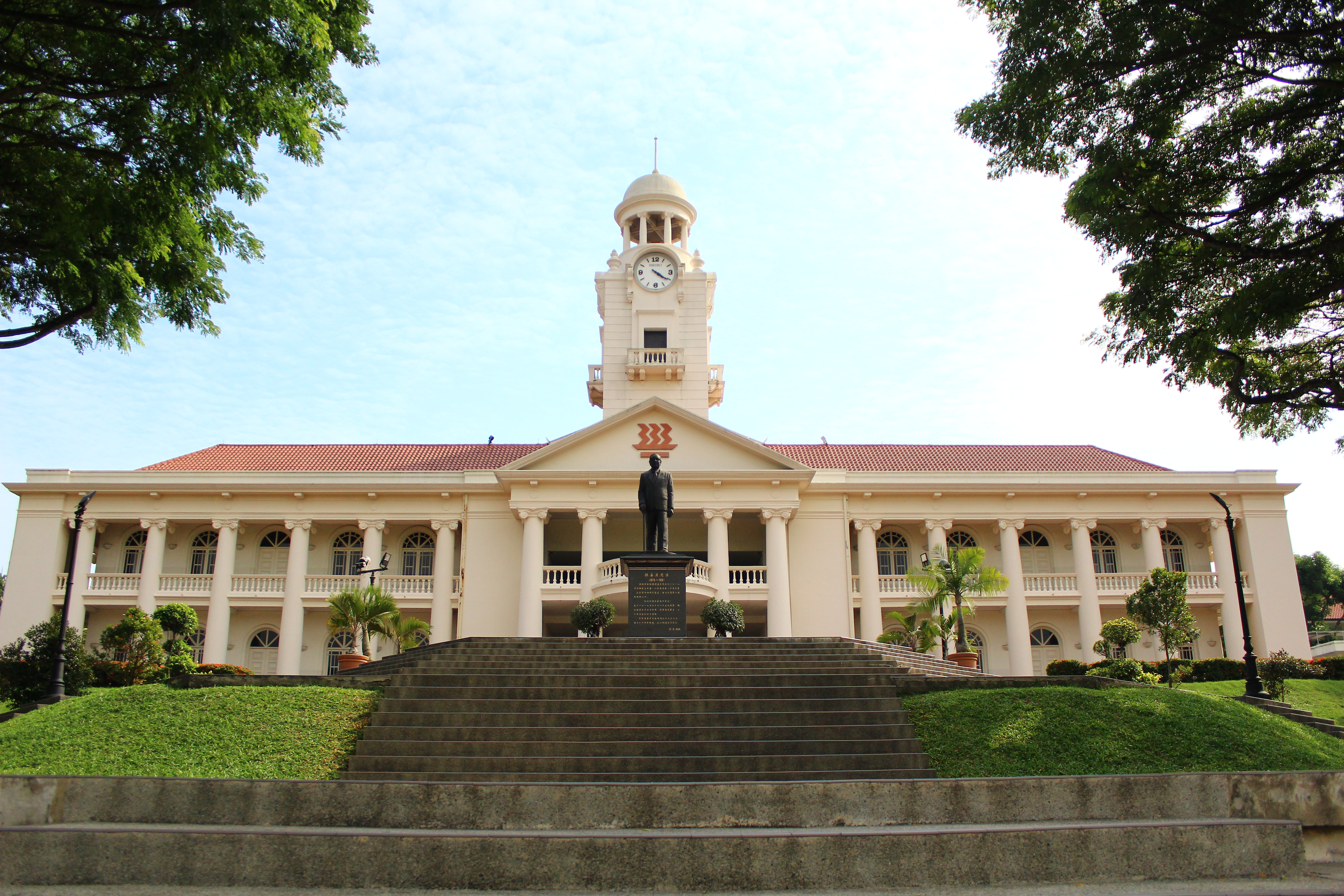
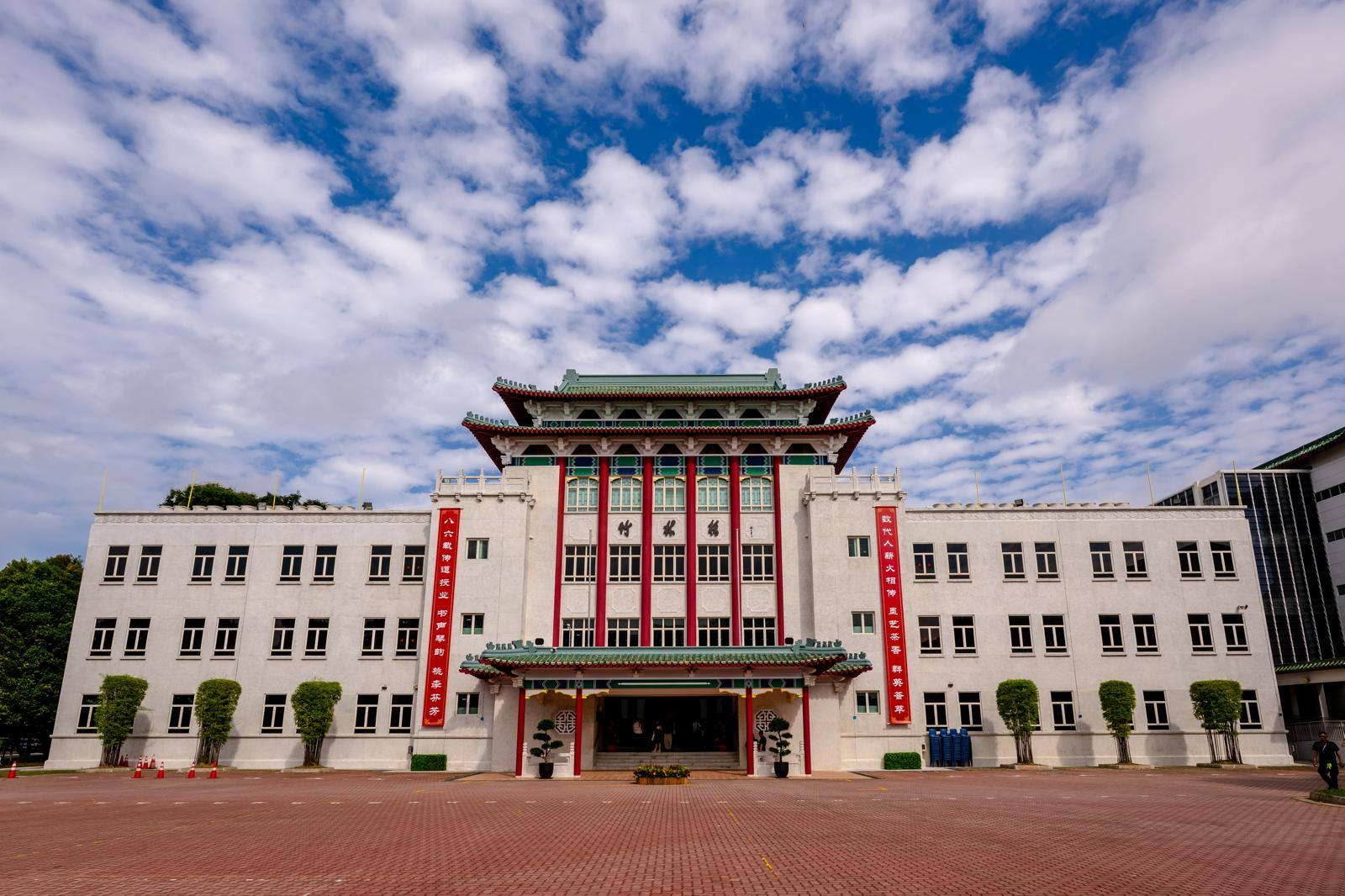
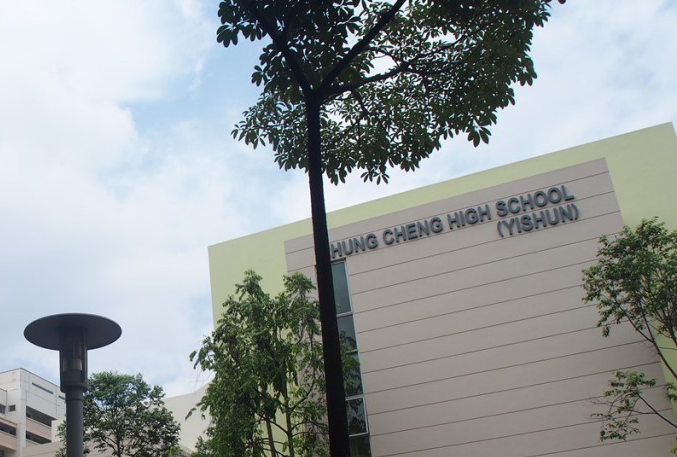
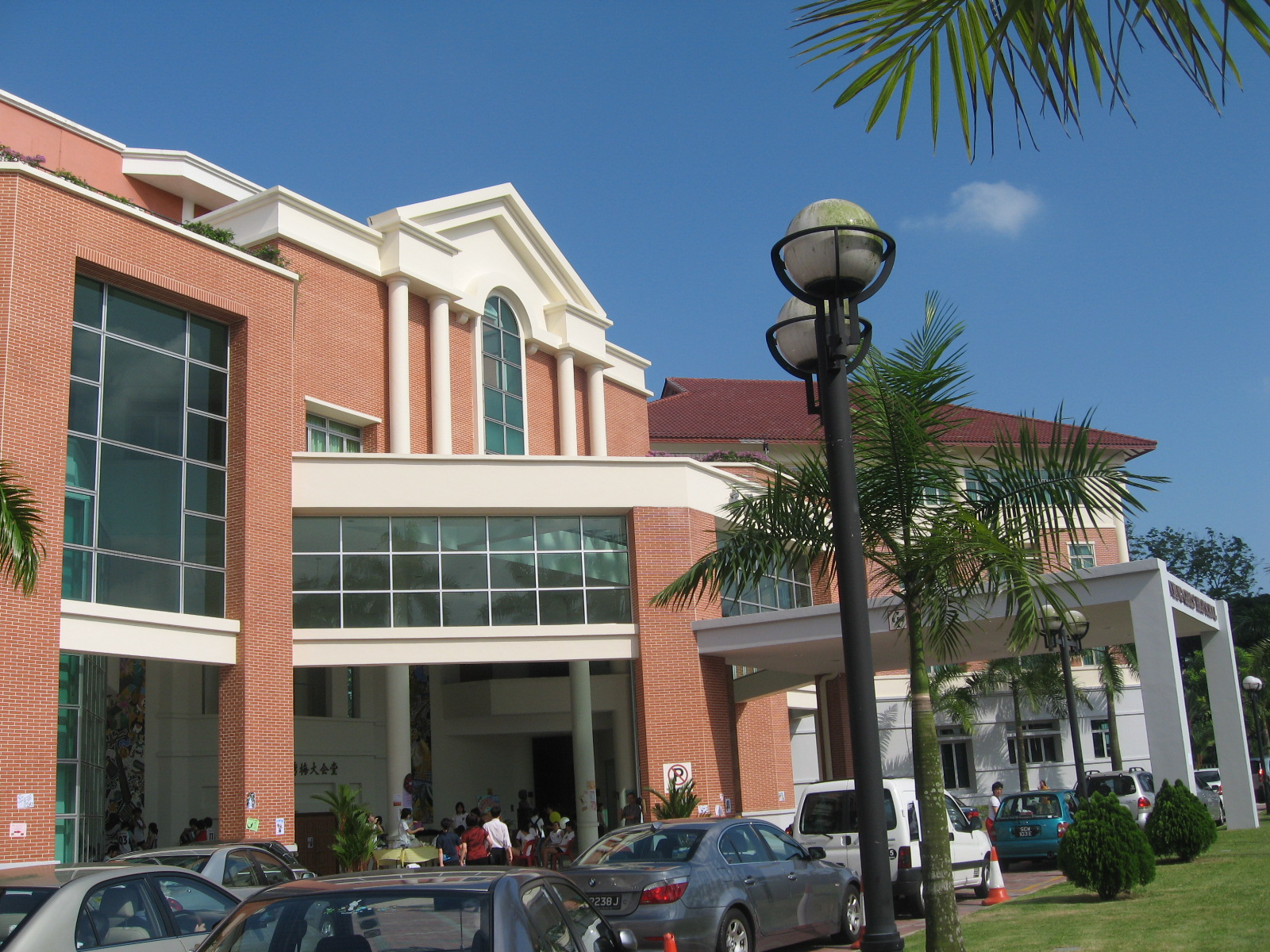
The schools of students involved; clockwise from upper left: The Chinese High School, Chung Cheng High School (Main), Nanyang Girls' High School, and Chung Cheng High School (Yishun).

After managing the Hock Lee bus riots, Marshall focused on the issue of the Chinese students, who were occupying Chinese schools that were closed during the Hock Lee riots; namely Chung Cheng High School's main and Yishun branch and The Chinese High School. The government ordered the schools' boards to expel the involved students and to provide the names of those that participated in the Hock Lee riots. However, this only intensified the conflict between the students and the authorities, with the students prolonging their sit-ins along with the participation of Nanyang Girls' High School. Marshall was pressured to respond, especially after the Singapore Factory and Shop Workers' Union threatened a strike in support of the students. He subsequently appointed an All-Party Committee to investigate the students' issues; the committee's first meeting advised Marshall to reopen the schools, which he did.

Marshall's management of the Hock Lee riots and the Chinese school sit-ins were met with criticism; letters were sent to The Straits Times detailing his incompetence as chief minister. In the weeks following the quelling of the Hock Lee riots, many expected Marshall and his government to exercise punishments on those involved, but their responses were considered to be small. During that period, the governor and chief secretary had urged him to send in troops, but he refused as he did not believe in police action. Furthermore, in the Chinese school sit-ins, Marshall was seen to have "meekly obeyed" to the Chinese students, despite calls of action to be taken on them such as deportation. The British had wanted Marshall to use local military to ease the situation, but eventually understood that military force would have affected the LF government's reputation and they helped by restraining the police force from acting against Marshall's plans. Chinese-language newspapers such as Nanyang Siang Pau and Sin Chew Jit Poh frowned upon police use as they supported the Chinese rioters and this move maintained their support towards Marshall's government.

As more strikes broke out across Singapore, with the main unionists being Devan Nair, Lim Chin Siong, and S. Woodhull, Marshall met with them to discuss and prevent a planned general strike on 13 June. Although the unionists described the meeting as cooperative, on 11 June Marshall's government arrested five unionists (Note: The five unionists were Fong Swee Suan, secretary of the SBWU; Ng Hock Guan, vice-president of the SBWU; Chia Phow Chew, Singapore Traction Company and S.T.C. Employee's Union member; Loh Wah Lim, general affairs officer of the Malayan Textile Mill Workers' Union; and Chen Yang Cheng, teacher at The Chinese High School.) under the Emergency Regulations for being involved in the planning of the general strike. This was met with aggression from the unions, but when 13 June arrived, only an eighth of the planned workers went on strike. On 5 July, Marshall held a final meeting with the unions, where they outlined the issues they faced. This meeting was successful, as both Marshall and the unions reached an agreement over the final disputed points, officially ending the strikes after 66 days. Following the conclusion of the strikes, Nicoll and The Straits Times both stated that the "unconditional surrender" of the Marshall government led to the strikers fulfilling all of their requests. Conversely, both Chinese-language and Malay-language newspapers praised the Marshall government's actions.

Marshall's government considered these strikes and riots to be fuelled by the communist threat at the time, (Note: Like many LF members, Marshall was an anti-communist, but his policies dealing with communism were widely seen as weak.) with an LF press report naming communism as one of the foremost issues. The civil unrest also caused the government to delay removing the Emergency Regulations, with the LF admitting that the communist threat was larger than expected and could not be handled without the Regulations. Furthermore, Marshall faced difficulties with Nicoll as the latter refused to show him security reports on the situation, instead keeping the matter between the governor and the chief secretary. Overall, Marshall's "soft" response to the strikes and riots reduced the British's confidence in his government, which they later used as a point to postpone independence.

==== Emergency Regulations ====
The Marshall government, acting on their 1955 election pledge, addressed the Emergency Regulations (Note: They were originally enacted in 1948, when a state of emergency was proclaimed in Singapore and the Federation of Malaya. They allowed police to enforce curfews and arrest individuals without trial, which was primarily used to target communist activity.) early on into their term. After inspecting the Regulations, they were modified to reduce their powers, but were extended for another three months; the powers removed were the search, seizure of property, and the closure of roads by the police. Marshall chose to introduce the Regulations' extension himself, despite the fact that it was an unpopular decision and supposed to be the duty of the chief secretary and colonial authorities. In July 1955, Marshall had planned to remove the Regulations, but was forced to extend them for another three months as it could have been interpreted as threatening to the Malayan government, who were attempting to stifle communism.

By October, Marshall decided to work on fully removing the Emergency Regulations. However, he met with opposition from the British and Malaya; the British had repeatedly advised against fully relaxing the Regulations, while Malaya interpreted it as potentially undermining their efforts in combatting the communist insurgency. Governor Robert Black's suggestion was for Marshall to repeal the Regulations and later have Black reinstate them, thereby bearing the resentment of the population on him, but Marshall rejected this proposal as hypocritical. The LF government, against renewing them every three months, opted instead to introduce seven new bills that would jointly hold the powers of the Emergency Regulations. Among these bills was the Preservation of Public Security Bill (PPSB), which allowed the chief minister to give detention without trial for two years, give the right of appeal to a tribunal consisting of three judges before releasing a detainee, and have it renewed in three years time, before Marshall left office.

This was met with great resistance from the PAP, who organised protests against the PPSB as it appeared to target the pro-communists elements within their party. The PAP held a rally on 18 September, three days before the PPSB was to be discussed in the Assembly, which had over 6,000 arriving to protest against it; furthermore, the PAP Trade Union Committee threatened a strike of their 80,000 members the day the PPSB was to be discussed. Black recommended that the PPSB's readings be done together to expedite the process, but Marshall declined as he wanted "it [to be] more democratic [and] allow all sides ample time to consider the [PPSB]". At the discussion of the bill in the Legislative Assembly, Marshall defended the bill against the opposition – which were the three PAP members and independent Ahmad Ibrahim – on why it should be instated. In public statements to the Singapore Standard, Marshall characterised elements of the PAP as communist. The bill was ultimately passed and, on 29 October, Marshall announced that the Emergency Regulations were no longer in use. Marshall's original plans for the Emergency Regulations were to move its power from the executive to the judiciary, which would have allowed detentions to be considered judicial acts. However, his powers did not allow for such a drastic change to the law, particularly one relating closely to internal security.

=== Constitutional crisis ===
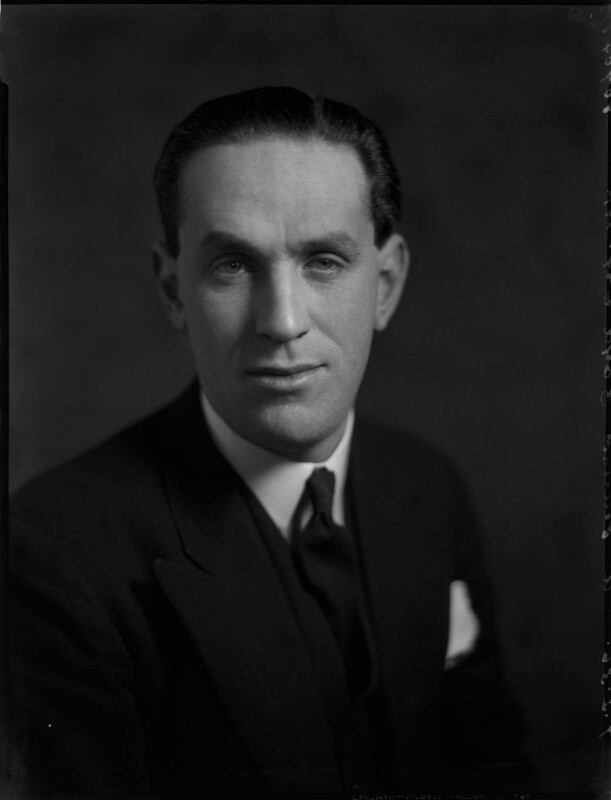
Marshall was asked to hold off on his resignation until the arrival of Alan Lennox-Boyd (pictured).

Following the handling of the riots, Marshall felt that his government was inadequate and inefficient. On 11 July 1955, Marshall wrote to Black, stating that the constitution allowed for the creation of nine new junior ministers, of which he wanted to appoint four first and the rest at a later date. In response, Black allowed him only two junior ministers. Marshall described this as a matter of "grave constitutional importance", as the governor did not acknowledge the opinion of his government and interpreted the Constitution as permitting the governor to override the chief minister's recommendations. After Black's refusal, Marshall threatened to resign due to the issues with the constitution. His resignation brought alarm from Singapore and the British, with Black requesting that Secretary of State for the Colonies Alan Lennox-Boyd visit Singapore while on his tour of the East in August, asking Marshall to postpone his resignation till Lennox-Boyd's arrival.

During this period, Marshall held a meeting with the Assembly, where he presented a three-part motion to the Assembly, which detailed that they would end colonial rule, rewrite the constitution to benefit those elected with the view of self-governance, and have the governor act on the advice of the chief minister. Marshall's motion saw support from twenty-eight members; only G. A. P. Sutherland dissented, and the colonial officials abstained. Following the passage of this motion on 25 July, Marshall held off on his resignation until the arrival of Lennox-Boyd. Lennox-Boyd arrived in Singapore on 31 July, returning once more on 15 August. After negotiations, the colonial authorities edited the governor's powers to be in favour of the elected ministers, requiring the governor to act on the advice or in consultation with the chief minister. Regarding self-governance, Marshall was invited to send a delegation to London to discuss it further.

=== Party and government issues ===
The LF experienced multiple internal conflicts throughout their time in office, such as financial issues, leadership issues, and conflicting viewpoints. Marshall was said to have a tendency to argue over differing viewpoints with his colleagues and did not hold frequent meetings with his ministers. The LF addressed these problems in their first annual conference on 29 October 1955, but this only introduced more financial and management issues. During the conference, executive member C. H. Koh suggested repealing the PPSB and validating the Malayan Communist Party (MCP), the government rejected this as conflicting with their policies. Furthermore, in the LF's party president election, Marshall chose not to contest and instead promoted his chief lieutenant Lim Yew Hock for the role. However, Lim lost the election to Farrer Park assemblyman A. R. Lazarous, who was an opponent of the current government. This prompted Marshall to investigate Lazarous's election, leading to some members walking out, but it was ultimately determined that Lazarous had bribed other members to vote for him, voiding his ballot. Lim was subsequently declared the party president.

These internal issues had since been made public, with Marshall attributing the disagreements to personal ambitions instead of policy differences. Lazarous and Koh had been pushing for positions in Marshall's cabinet since April, which was intensified by the new junior minister posts introduced following the constitutional crisis. After learning of their rejections, Lazarous and Koh rebelled against Marshall, alongside Queenstown assemblyman Lee Choon Eng, who was similarly denied a ministerial position. This eventually culminated in Lazarous and Lee leaving LF on 7 November to join the opposition, significantly affecting the LF government's majority as both sides now had an even 16 seats. (Note: However, the LF's government contained only 11 elected members as compared to the opposition's 14; the remaining five were nominated members.) This led to a possibility by the opposition to hold a no-confidence vote and form their own coalition, with the PP and DP supporting this initiative. Eventually, the opposition called for new elections to be held. In response, Marshall challenged the opposition at the upcoming November budget debate, where he stated that he would dissolve the Assembly if the budget was voted down. During the budget debate, PAP assemblyman Lee Kuan Yew criticised Marshall's budget, but did not advocate for the government's dissolution. In the end, Marshall's government survived the budget debate with a vote of 19 to 13.

Following this, Marshall implemented several populist and anti-colonial measures to reinforce his position as chief minister and gain political leverage. For example, he linked the renewal of the Exchange Control Ordinance with the development of constitutional talks with the British, effectively tying economic stability to political negotiations. He further called for the expedited passing of the Labour Ordinance, despite lacking proper regulations from the Assembly. During this period, Marshall saw continued support from the British despite disagreements over his handling of a communist-led public transportation strike and his populist, anti-colonialist views. Black stated in a despatch that "[his] policy, in the absence of any palatable alternatives, [was] to attempt to keep Mr Marshall in position". With the British's support, Marshall acquired a vote of confidence for his government and successfully enacted the Labour Ordinance. He further obtained a multi-party consensus that the upcoming constitutional talks would establish a fully elected legislature controlling the internal government, while foreign relations and external defence would remain under the British.

==== Government reorganisation ====
As recommended by the Rendel Constitution, the City Council and Rural Board were suggested to be replaced with a City and Island Council that would be made up of elected members. In response, Marshall's government established the Committee of Local Government in July 1955 to explore decentralising the City Council and Rural Board and to consider creating additional councils. Based on the committee's recommendations, the Rural Board was abolished and replaced with a city council and four district councils responsible for managing the Singapore Island and northern islands. The committee also recommended retaining the local government authorities. A city council made up of 32 elected members – one of whom would be elected amongst them as the mayor – would also be established, but it ended up as an outlet that the PAP used to enhance their reputation. The committee further recommended separating the functions of housing and planning, a measure that eventually contributed to the modern Housing and Development Board and the Public Utilities Board.

==== Suggested coalitions ====
By the end of 1955, Marshall wanted to strengthen the LF–alliance government by including the PAP. He approached them in January 1956, but was told they wanted to wait until after the constitutional talks in April to join them. Subsequently, the Liberal Socialist Party (Note: The Liberal Socialist Party was formed on 5 February 1956 after a merge between the Progressive Party and the Democratic Party.) (LSP) reached out to Marshall to inquire their addition to the coalition. At an 11 February LF meeting, party leaders Marshall and Lim spoke for including the LSP, with Marshall stating that the LF would not gain self-governance by themselves. However, Francis Thomas and J. M. Jumabhoy opposed this idea as it would reduce their support from the workers and offend the Chinese-speaking community. At that meeting, Lim Yew Hock and R. C. H. Lim warned against a coalition with the PAP as they would be "definitely absorbed" by them. Ultimately, they decided to not form any new coalitions prior to the constitutional talks.

=== Education and multilingualism ===
Before Marshall took office, the Chinese community in Singapore had been campaigning for equal treatment of Chinese-language education alongside English-language education. Enrolment to Chinese schools in Singapore was high after World War II, with 58% of the population receiving a Chinese education in 1948. However, over the years, English education steadily became more favoured. The dropping enrolment numbers, coupled with the introduction of the School Registration Ordinance – which allowed authorities to close schools suspected of communist influence – and the active campaigning for the establishment of Nanyang University, led to more heightened aggression from the Chinese community. They believed the ordinance specifically focused on reducing Chinese education, and while fundraising for Nanyang University, Chinese students were seen as "defenders of Chinese education".

In May 1955, following the Chinese student riots breaking out, Marshall established an All-Party Committee to "re-examine the general situation of Chinese schools". He had each political party represented on the committee, though he was not a member himself. The Committee would present their findings in early 1956 in two papers, the All-Party Report and White Paper on Education Policy. According to academic Chan Heng Chee, the All-Party Committee's papers were the Marshall government's most significant contributions, as they outlined a multilingual education policy for Singapore. These papers would become the basis for education in the following years, as the government would offer a choice of education in four different languages and the option to take up a second language as detailed in the papers. The Legislative Assembly widely accepted the White Paper, although criticism came from the PAP and the PP. Lee Kuan Yew noted that the White Paper did not frame Malay as the language of the future, but Marshall argued that English would emerge as the dominant language due to Singapore's role as an international trade hub; the PAP would adopt such a view in the 1970s for their own language policy.

Alongside the education issue, the use of multilingualism also arose. The non-English-speaking community wanted multilingualism to be prohibited in the Legislative Assembly, so that they could better represent their views and participate in politics. At the 1955 general election, the issue of multilingualism was not brought up as only English speakers were allowed to vote, but Marshall stated "multilingualism was practical" during his campaign. Marshall eventually included this issue on his list of points he was to discuss at the December 1955 preliminary talks, and, in February 1956, he gained the unanimous approval of the Assembly to allow multilingualism in debates. This would be built upon in the State of Singapore Act of 1958, which allowed representatives to hold their debates in one of the four recognised languages.

=== Citizenship ===
Under British rule, the Singaporean populace was divided into British and non-British subjects. British subjects, which included naturalised subjects and Commonwealth subjects, were allowed political rights, while non-British subjects did not have any. A large portion of non-British subjects were around 220,000 China-born individuals who, despite contributing to Singapore's economic success, had no political rights. They were unwilling to seek naturalisation to British nationality as it required them to swear allegiance to the British Crown and denounce their Chinese nationality. The Chinese community advocated for proper citizenship rights unsuccessfully prior to Marshall taking office.

Following political strikes in June 1955 by the Chinese community, the government acknowledged citizenship as an issue. Marshall met with members of the Singapore Chinese Chamber of Commerce (SCCC) and requested they publicly condemn the strikes. He subsequently held further discussions with them that looked through their previous citizenship suggestions. In July, Marshall announced his plans for a Singaporean citizenship that required applicants to meet a minimum residential period, declare Singapore as their permanent home, renounce other nationalities, make an oath of allegiance to the British, and pledge loyalty towards Singapore. This plan received support from the SCCC, but the PAP and SUMNO opposed it as it created a "second class citizenship" that allowed non-British subjects citizenship rights. Other critics of his citizenship plan included the British, who believed that the people were not ready, and the ethnic Malay community, who would become outnumbered by the Chinese and Indian immigrants.

Citizenship would also be discussed between Marshall and the leaders of Malaya, where Marshall defended his citizenship plans by arguing that the loyalty of the Chinese community needed to be secured first before considering the establishment of a Chinese embassy. Malayan chief minister Tunku Abdul Rahman indicated that a merger between Singapore and Malaya would be difficult to consider if Marshall did not concede to his current citizenship plans. In light of this, and along with the criticism from the PAP and SUMNO, Marshall ultimately decided to modify his proposal. On 6 September, he began holding meetings with a twenty-member committee made up of different communities and political parties to develop a revised citizenship plan. The revised plan saw all individuals born in Singapore automatically granted Singaporean citizenship, including full political rights and responsibilities.

Marshall met Lennox-Boyd in London and asked him if he would veto the citizenship plan if the Legislative Assembly passed it. Lennox-Boyd replied that Marshall needed the agreement from all communities in Singapore to go forward with his plans. At the 1956 constitutional talks, the British agreed to a Singaporean citizenship that would be similar to the Sino-Indonesian Dual Nationality Treaty. Despite the breaking down of the talks, Marshall's agreement with the British of a basis for a Singaporean citizenship was successful. An ordinance on citizenship was later passed in 1957.

=== Civil service ===
Following World War II, local officers in the public sector and army believed they were treated less favourably as compared to European officers in the same sectors, particularly in terms of back pay, allowance, and employment conditions. This disparity led local civil servants to resent the colonial government. Locals also felt they were receiving slower promotions to higher posts, leading to a public challenge from the unions to the colonial government. This movement gained support both inside and outside the civil service, becoming a factor in gaining self-governance.

Upon assuming office, Marshall found the Rendel Constitution to be vague on certain points, especially on who was in control of power; the Constitution described the chief minister as performing the role of the "prime minister in a fully self-governing state", but Marshall found himself deferring to the governor and chief secretary in practice. Civil servants were given the role of briefing their respective ministers on matters, but Marshall's government considered expatriate civil servants difficult to work with as they had previously exercised greater authority. In the first few months of 1955, the Marshall government attempted to establish proper relationships between the ex-officio ministers – namely the chief secretary, financial secretary, and attorney-general – and the expatriate civil service. Expatriate civil servants were often uncooperative with the new arrangement seeing as they had to respond to ministers, and Marshall regarded the attorney-general's chambers as undercutting his government.

On 4 August 1955, after he challenged the governor on the Constitution's points, Marshall created a Malayanisation Commission that would examine the civil service to conclude the "[most] rapid, systemic and complete malayanisation of the Public Service". Chaired by B. R. Sreenivasan, the Commission met over a six-month periodThey investigated training more graduates, increasing the training of local officers, abolishing and compensating expatriate officers' positions, and "malayanising" different departments. In February 1956, an Interim Report was published, although unanimous agreement was not achieved, with commissioners T. P. F. McNeice and Robert Ho submitting a Minority Report. The Interim Report strongly suggested replacing expatriate officers in conjunction with self-governance, in order to ensure a government that was "entirely or almost entirely carried out by the country". The Minority Report offered that they would lose efficiency and funds in replacing the expatriates.

Despite the report, PAP leader Lee Kuan Yew criticised Marshall's malayanisation efforts. As early as November 1955, when Marshall's government presented their first budget, Lee noted the continuation of high salaries being paid to senior colonial officers and questioned Marshall's malayanisation efforts as Lee considered Marshall to have "[drifted] towards his expatriate officials" with "keenness to defend them". In response, Marshall had Sreenivasan publicly refute Lee's views. However, as chief minister, Marshall's relationships with colonial officials led some to believe that he was not fully committed to anti-colonialism. The Malayanisation Commission's report would not be acted on for nine months, but malayanisation was included on the agenda of the 1956 constitutional talks. Eventually, the Assembly would pass the White Paper on Malayanisation in December 1956, based largely on the Commission's suggestions. By 1959, a large majority of the civil service had undergone malayanisation.

=== Social welfare ===
In 1955, Marshall's government amended the Central Provident Fund Ordinance (CPF), which Marshall originally introduced in 1953 as a member of the PP. The government appointed a committee, led by economist Sir Sydney Caine, to examine the minimum standard of living that the government should adopt. In March 1955, it was announced that the government would adopt the committee's suggestions by 1 May 1955. The CPF allowed workers to retrieve the money they contributed once they reached 55 years old, while still being able to withdraw money prior to that age if needed.

Marshall also supported the creation of a free legal aid bureau during his election campaign; the first draft of the Legal Aid and Advice Bill received negative reception from the Bar Committee, who felt that it should be run by lawyers instead of a government department and that it function similarly to Britain's legal aid scheme. Marshall stated that it was based on Australia's Free Legal Aid and Advice scheme, which was investigated by registrar Tan Thoon Lip. On 6 June 1956, the Legal Aid and Advice Ordinance was passed, allowing those earning less than S$1,000 yearly access to free legal aid. The Legal Aid Bureau would later be established on 1 July 1958, becoming the first country in Southeast Asia to offer such a service.

=== Public engagement ===
During his chief ministership, Marshall introduced Meet-the-People Sessions (MPS), where he met with citizens at the conference room of the Public Relations Office. These sessions were held weekly and typically lasted seven to eight hours long. Marshall later expanded these sessions to include representatives of the relevant ministries that received the most common issues. He had previously promised to establish communication with citizens during the election campaign, stating he would "dedicate a day in every week to receive the people of Singapore". They began in June 1955. MPS promoted political engagement with the locals, and Chan regards this as "the most innovative of Marshall's policies", while the academic Kevin Tan called it "a brilliant idea". The PAP later adopted MPS to receive their own feedback.

To help empower MPS, Marshall established the Public Advisory Bureau (PAB), which he paid for personally as it was not an official government initiative. The PAB stopped shortly after Marshall's chief ministership. The most common issues the PAB handled were unemployment issues, immigration, social welfare, and subsidies. His government also established sixteen branches throughout Singapore in their first seven months in office. The largest branches were in the constituencies of Farrer Park, Pasir Panjang, and Tanglin.

== Foreign affairs ==
=== Indonesia ===
Following his constitutional success in August, Marshall sought to improve bilateral relations with Indonesia, with the aim of easing trade restrictions. In the 1950s, Singapore served as one of Indonesia's largest markets in produce, largely due to barter trade and Singapore's status as a free port. As Indonesia faced economic issues, they attempted to establish their own free ports in competition against Singapore and established the Benteng policy. This significantly stalled trade between the countries. Before his trip to Indonesia, three Indonesian officials arrived in July 1955 to hold preliminary discussions. In September, Marshall led a delegation to Indonesia, including his ministers J. M. Jumabhoy and Abdul Jumat, and arrived in Jakarta. During the visit, Marshall held trade discussions with the Indonesian government.

At the time, newly elected Indonesian prime minister Burhanuddin Harahap's government had introduced regulations to control graft, which halted trade between Singapore and Indonesia entirely. They eventually reached an agreement where a Singaporean economic mission (with the option of including Malaya) would be sent to Indonesia in October, followed by a full economic mission in December. Indonesia also agreed to relax the regulations on textile imports, temporarily ease the importation of slab rubber, and import dried fish from Singapore. Marshall received praise upon his return to Singapore from both English-language and Chinese-language newspapers.

=== Federation of Malaya ===
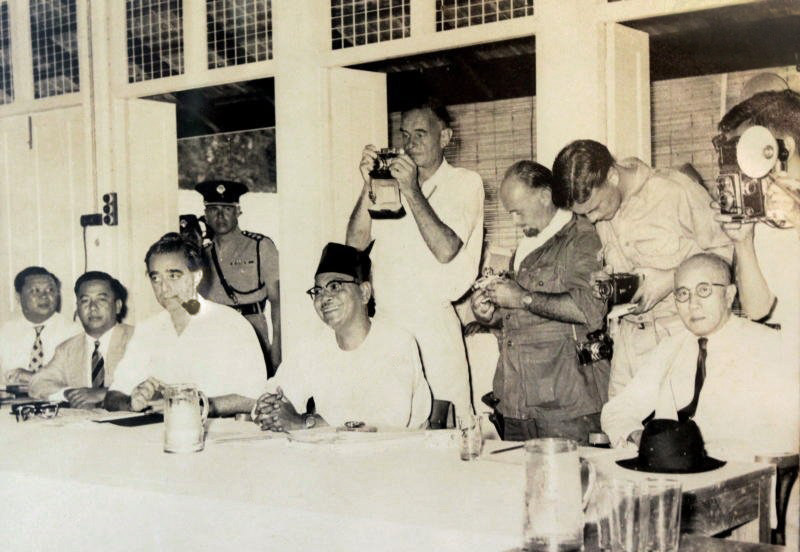
Marshall (with pipe) at the 1955 Baling Talks alongside Tunku Abdul Rahman (centre) and Tan Cheng Lock (right).

Since the 1955 general elections, merger with Malaya had been a key political objective for Singapore and had been a point of interest at the election. Both the LF and PAP regarded merger with Malaya as the most viable route towards independence, given concerns for Singapore's viability as a standalone nation. In Malaya, the UMNO's leader and chief minister Tunku Abdul Rahman was an opponent of the idea; when first asked in January 1955, Tunku rejected the proposal. He believed that merger was "a very long way off" and should only be considered after both countries gained independence.

In August, Tunku and Marshall would officially meet in Singapore, but the former was still opposed to merger. After returning from the December 1955 talks in London, Marshall broached the idea of merger to him again and found Tunku to be more receptive. Tunku had revised his earlier position from merger coming after independence to possibly incorporating Singapore into the Federation as a state. However, this was undesirable and Marshall spoke to Tunku in Kuala Lumpur to consider a confederation as an alternative, but was unsuccessful. In March 1956, Tunku suggested to Marshall that he should "limit his London objective to self-government" as "it could hardly expect to be granted independence on its own". Tunku then floated the idea that attaining independence could be done later by joining Malaya.

In December 1955, Tunku and his finance minister Tan Cheng Lock met with Marshall in Baling, Kedah, to take part in discussions aimed at resolving the Malayan Emergency, particularly issues concerning the Malayan Communist Party (MCP) and its leader Chin Peng. The discussions, later known as the Baling Talks, were initiated after the MCP requested a meeting with Tunku and Tan in late September. Chin initially expressed reservations of Marshall's inclusions, but Tunku insisted on his participation. Marshall's inclusion was eventually confirmed by mid-October, a development that significantly raised his political reputation. The talks were held at the Baling English School from 28 to 29 December. Although negotiations broke down on the 29th, the talks were nonetheless regarded as having been of some value. Marshall later stated his belief that the main point of conflict was his and Tunku's refusal to recognise the MCP.

== 1956 constitutional talks and resignation ==
=== Background ===
On 2 December 1955, Marshall travelled to London to hold preliminary constitutional talks, stopping in Sri Lanka and India first where he met their respective prime ministers John Kotelawala and Jawaharlal Nehru. While in Sri Lanka and India, he spoke about anti-colonialism, but after speaking with Nehru, Marshall became interested in pursuing dominion status for Singapore instead of self-governance. These remarks drew criticism from The Straits Times as his position had differed, and the Colonial Secretary rejected the proposal on the grounds that Singapore did not hold full sovereignty unlike other dominions. Furthermore, his speeches in Sri Lanka and India were heavily criticised in Singapore, with Lee Kuan Yew describing them as "humbug". In his biography on Marshall, Kevin Tan stated that he got "carried away" after receiving international attention from the media, with most of his opinions "purely personal".

Nevertheless, it was decided that a constitutional conference would be held in 1956 to discuss Singapore's internal self-governance. Alongside these developments, the British made the post of chief minister independent, designating Marshall's second portfolio of commerce minister to the assistant commerce minister (Jumabhoy); allowed the Legislative Assembly to sanction multilingualism in debates; and gave control of the National Servicemen to the Singaporean government.

In March 1956, Marshall sought to bolster Singapore's position at the upcoming constitutional talks in London by holding a "Merdeka Week", (Note: Merdeka is a term in the Indonesian and Malay languages meaning "independence".) timed to coincide with the arrival of a delegation of six British parliamentarians tasked with assessing the prospects of independence. It was planned that, upon their arrival at Kallang Airport, a petition with over 170,000 signatures supporting self-governance would be presented to the parliamentarians, followed by a speech given by Marshall. However, as Marshall stood on a wooden stage alongside other politicians such as Lee Kuan Yew, Ong Eng Guan, and Lim Chin Siong, the crowd shook the hastily-constructed stage, causing it to topple. It eventually escalated into a clash between the crowd and the police, and severely affected the reputation of possible self-governance for Singapore.

=== Constitutional talks ===
In April 1956, as planned at the December 1955 talks, the British received a Singaporean delegation to hold the constitutional talks. The topics of discussion, which were similarly outlined at the December 1955 talks, included the definition of self-governance, a possible date for the introduction of self-governance, and the functioning of the Legislative Assembly, external defence, external relations, and public service. On 5 April, the Legislative Assembly – with the exception of G. A. P. Sutherland and the officials – unanimously agreed that the All-Party Delegation were to discuss "the status of an independent territory within the Commonwealth and ceding back external defence and external relations other than trade and commerce to the Government of the United Kingdom" at the constitutional talks.

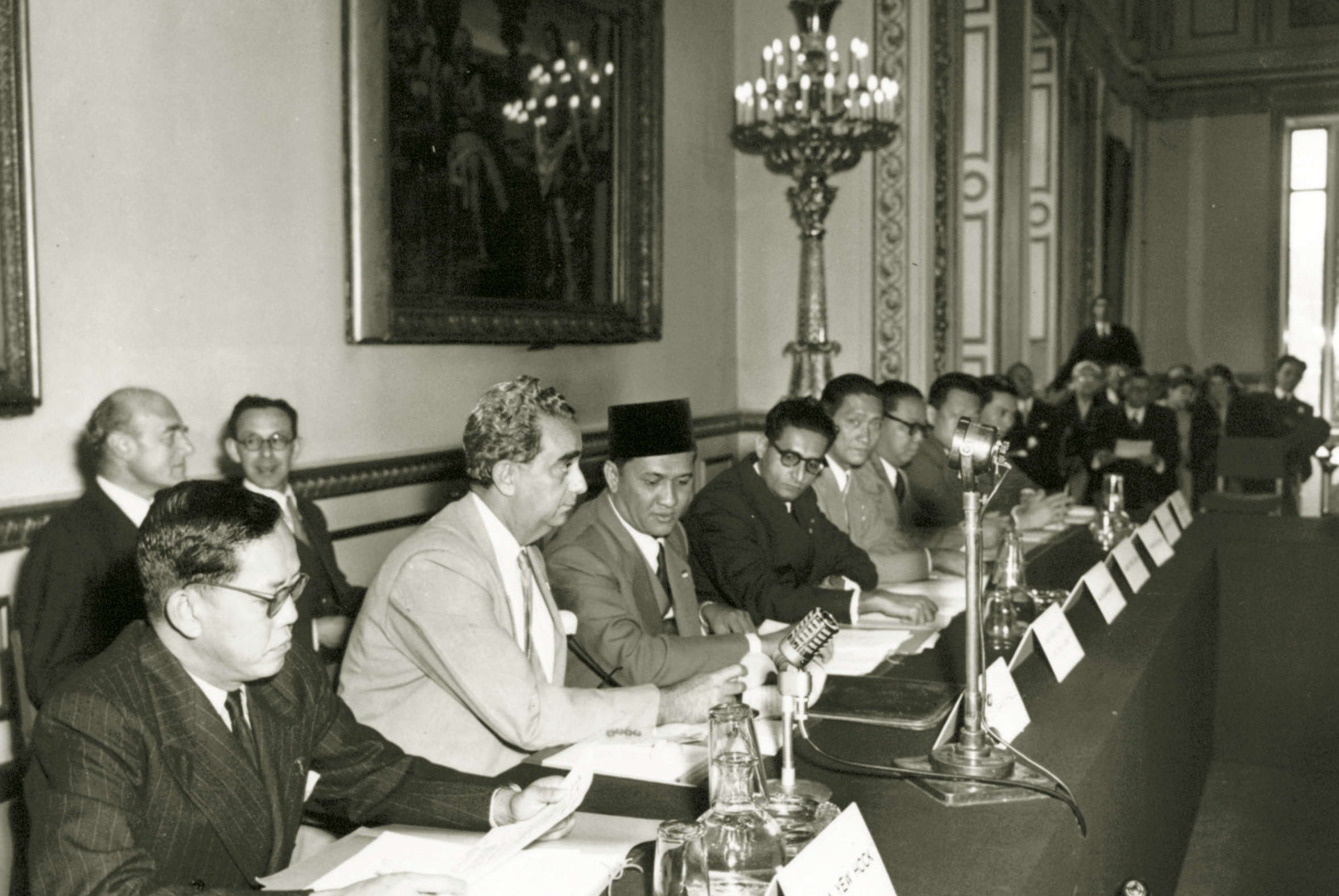
The Singaporean delegation in London, 1956. Marshall is sat second from the left.

On 14 April, the 13-man Singaporean delegation left for London. (Note: The delegation was composed of Chief Minister Marshall, Labour Minister Lim Yew Hock, Local Government Minister Abdul Hamid Jumat, Health Minister A. J. Braga, Commerce and Industry Minister J. M. Jumabhoy, LF assemblymen Seah Peng Chuan and Wong Foo Nam, LSP assemblymen Lim Choon Meng, William Tan, Lim Koon Teck, and Lim Cher Keng, and PAP assemblymen Lee Kuan Yew and Lim Chin Siong. Additionally accompanying the delegation were Secretary R. C. Hoffman, Assistant Secretary G. Leembruggen, Special Assistant Lee Siow Mong, Governor Robert Black, Director of Personnel J. D. Higham, and Attorney-General C. H. Butterfield.) The constitutional talks opened on 23 April and focused on the delegation's view of independence, formation of a Singaporean citizenship, and management by the Commonwealth Office. The Colonial Secretary responded that the British wanted to maintain control of Singapore's defence, particularly internal security and external affairs, or at least maintain joint control between them.

Following a brief adjournment over the weekend, the Singaporean delegation gave their memorandum and a draft of Heads of Agreement, which aimed for Singapore's independence by April 1957. On 25 April, Alan Lennox-Boyd rejected the delegation's proposed April 1957 independence date and instead offered a new constitution which granted a larger degree of self-governance, but still retained British control over Singapore's defence. Among other concessions from the British, Marshall ultimately refused this counteroffer. Over the next few days, the constitutional talks slowly broke down following internal disagreements in the Singaporean delegation, such as Marshall's refusal to compromise with the British. Dealing with the issue of the British reserve powers, Marshall suggested that three representatives from Singapore and the United Kingdom be appointed to a Defence and Security Council, with a Malayan serving as its chairman. However, Lennox-Boyd insisted on a British high commissioner serving as chairman, leading to the delegation unanimously voting against the British's plan, with only the LSP abstaining. The talks subsequently broke down on 15 May.

=== Aftermath ===
Later that same day, Marshall met with British prime minister Anthony Eden and Lennox-Boyd at 10 Downing Street, where he expressed his frustration over the talks with Eden. In the afternoon, he attended the House of Commons debate on the Singapore constitutional talks and found Labour Party parliamentarians suggesting a reopening of the talks, inspiring Marshall to meet up with his delegates to plan something similar. On 16 May, Marshall discussed the matter further with Lennox-Boyd, who was unopposed but wanted to know what the rest of the delegation thought. In a meeting on 17 May, despite the opposition parties being uninterested in restarting the talks, Marshall outlined his planned negotiation points, namely that new legislation by the Colonial Office should seek the approval of the House of Commons first; that the Colonial Office should no longer manage Singapore; and that Singapore's head of state would be a local unaffiliated with the British.

However, Marshall's delegation criticised him heavily for his decision to reopen the constitutional talks. It was seen as "humiliating" and "degrading", with accusations from the opposition that Marshall only wanted to restart the talks to maintain his office as chief minister. Furthermore, he had announced his decision to reopen talks first to the press, before discussing this with his delegation. This lack of support undoubtedly halted any possibility of reopening the talks, as Lennox-Boyd was only willing if Marshall received the full support of his delegation. In spite of that, Marshall noted that Lennox-Boyd was willing to discuss these new proposals, with the only caveat being the lack of support. He returned to Singapore on 21 May, with the idea that Lennox-Boyd would support his plan of moving Singapore from the Colonial Office and granting a local head of state, if he received support.

"nobody in this House would be mad enough to try and move a motion of censure on the Hon. the Chief Minister [...] Many in this House, in spite of all our disagreements with him, would like to say that he did not spare himself in the conference; he worked hard, he believed in what he was doing and he went all out to do it. Sometimes he was very wrong and I am sorry we had to tell him that he was very wrong. But all said and done, we wish him bon voyage."

— Lee Kuan Yew, (Low 2004, p. 63)

Marshall continued to preach his plan to the Colonial Secretary to reopen the talks, under the assumption that his plan would succeed and he would resign if it did not by 6 June. During this time, his fellow LF members had been urging him to resign, with arrangements being made to replace him with another member as chief minister. By 23 May, Lim Yew Hock was already viewed as the upcoming chief minister, following support from both the LF and Lennox-Boyd. The evening of his return, Marshall had contacted Robin Black to inquire whether Lennox-Boyd would receive a new delegation headed by Lim that discussed his originally planned points, if Marshall resigned. On 28 May, Lennox-Boyd replied that he did not want to interfere with Singapore's affairs and, on 30 May, the Colonial Office rejected Marshall's points outright, ensuring Marshall's resignation. On 6 June, Marshall appeared before the Legislative Assembly and requested a censure following his performance at the constitutional talks, but was rejected. On 7 June, he requested a censure again but was similarly refused. Marshall resigned later that day at 5:00 p.m. SST as chief minister, but remained as a backbencher; Lim succeeded him.

== External assessments ==
=== British view ===
Throughout his tenure as chief minister, the British tolerated Marshall. Although they preferred his removal from office, there were concerns that doing so would result in the PAP coming into power and forming a government perceived to be more pro-communist, or necessitate fresh elections shortly after Marshall's appointment. As a result, the British consistently accommodated Marshall when he threatened resignation. Views from London regarded Marshall as difficult to work with and expressed a desire for his departure, but also acknowledged that his removal could lead to a "more radical and irresponsible government" taking his place. Around July to August 1955, after his success in trade with Indonesia, Marshall was reported to have a good relationship with Governor Robert Black. The Colonial Secretary explained to British prime minister Eden the British's policy of Marshall as:

If Marshall's coalition threw its hand in or were driven out of office it would be necessary either at once to suspend the Constitution or to hold fresh general election. The latter course would almost certainly secure the return of a government so much further to the left than the present one that the suspension of the Constitution would still before long become unavoidable. The consequences of suspending the Constitution are not easy to predict but might well be very damaging indeed and ought not to be induced if they could possibly be prevented.

Before the 1956 constitutional talks, the British may have already decided to not grant internal self-governance as early as April 1955. Their concerns centred around the Marshall government's ability to maintain internal security and its political stability. Secretary of State for the Colonies Alan Lennox-Boyd was convinced that Singapore would not be given self-governance, writing to Eden in January 1956 that "it may be necessary to take a different line in Singapore from that which is found acceptable in the Federation [of Malaya]". Black similarly expressed reservations over granting Singapore self-governance. Although Marshall's willingness to leave defence and foreign affairs under the British control relieved some concerns, the issue of his ability to stay in power remained.

Lennox-Boyd further characterised Singapore's independence as "a delusion", and instead recommended that Singapore merge with Malaya. He proposed that, at the 1956 constitutional talks, the British demonstrate that "we have gone as far as our vital strategic and economic interests permit towards meeting the desire of the people of Singapore to manage their own affairs". He also recommended that they reserve the governor's role over Singapore's defence, foreign affairs, and internal security as a necessity, given Singapore's lack of local forces. By contrast, Black was willing to accommodate Marshall's demands, provided they received guarantee on securing Singapore's military bases. Black also warned that refusing Marshall would certainly lead to his resignation and that the PAP would exploit the anti-colonial resentment generated by this against them. Marshall later stated in an interview that the British did not trust his "soft" policies towards communists in Singapore and that some of his decisions, such as that to extend the Emergency Regulations, led Black's predecessor John Nicoll to dislike him.

=== Australian view ===
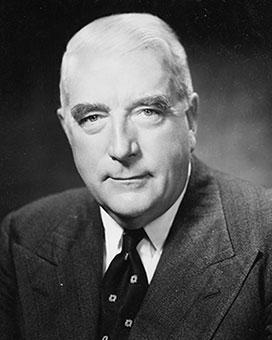
The Australian government, under Prime Minister Robert Menzies (pictured), maintained the view that the British should not grant Singapore self-governance, with a merger with Malaya being more desirable.

Following the Malayan Emergency in 1948, the British increased Malaya's political autonomy as British prime ministers Clement Attlee and Winston Churchill believed that it would allow greater political cooperation with the non-communist leaders in Malaya. The British planned for the independence of Malaya to be a lengthy process, but the Alliance Party's landslide victory at the 1955 Malayan general election led to much earlier calls of independence for Malaya. The Australian government under Prime Minister Robert Menzies were doubtful of the British's plans as transferring the power to Malaya would affect Australia's defence in the region. The Australian government was also concerned with how the transfer of power to Malaya would influence Singapore's political future as well, with some senior ministers believing that Singapore would soon follow Malaya.

On 17 January 1956, Menzies spoke to Eden about the defence plan for Malaya and how it could not be separated from decisions about Singapore, noting that the Commonwealth's security arrangements in Southeast Asia would largely hinge on the position of the Singapore government. Eden agreed with Menzies that the security of Malaya and Singapore was closely related, but argued that Britain could adopt a more accommodating approach toward Tunku; Eden believed that Tunku was more aware of the communist threat and more committed to addressing it. He considered the internal security of Singapore to be significantly more difficult than that of Malaya's, and therefore maintained that the British's policy towards Singapore would not be limited to agreements made with Malaya. As the Australian government observed the civil unrest and riots of Singapore in 1955, they did not believe that Marshall's government would last.

As the 1956 constitutional talks in London approached, Australian policymakers discussed their view of Singapore from late February to early March 1956. The Australian commissioner for Southeast Asia, Alan Watt, stated that if the British granted self-governance to Singapore, Marshall would be removed from office and replaced with someone more volatile. Watt explained that "the problems [Marshall] has to face are so intractable that it is difficult to be optimistic enough to believe that he will succeed in solving them". Therefore, the assistant secretary of the Department of External Affairs, James Plimsoll, maintained that while Britain should avoid rejecting independence as Singapore's eventual objective – as denying it outright could lead to further unrest – they must not grant early independence, since he believed it carried a serious risk of communist control and regional instability. Plimsoll thought that Britain needed to retain authority over defence, foreign affairs, and internal security.

Watt warned that Australian recommendations to the British to delay Singapore's independence could bring hostility from Marshall if discovered, while also contradicting Australia's original stand on using the military for internal security. While rejecting immediate independence, he argued that a merger with Malaya remained the only viable solution, a position later echoed by the diplomat Laurence McIntyre, who advised the Australian government to ignore Singapore as a separate entity, and instead support a merger with Malaya despite the likelihood of short-term instability. However, both the British and Tunku considered merger to be unlikely at that point in time. On 27 March 1956, Australia informed the British of their position on the matter, where Menzies advised Eden to go "to the limit of reasonableness in meeting Marshall's demands".

=== Other views ===
Following the failure of the 1956 constitutional talks and Marshall's resignation, South and Southeast Asian countries privately expressed their understanding of the British's position at the talks, with the Indian government reportedly regarding Marshall as "impatient". Indian prime minister Nehru considered the prospect of a Chinese-dominated government to be "distressing" and therefore favoured a more gradual transfer of power. Although Indonesia showed little interest about Singapore's self-governance, the Indonesian embassy in Australia reportedly showed "concern about the growth of communism in Singapore". Upon learning of the news of the failed constitutional talks, Tunku remarked that he was "very, very sorry indeed", before reportedly adding "please can I now go back to bed?"

== Evaluation and reception ==
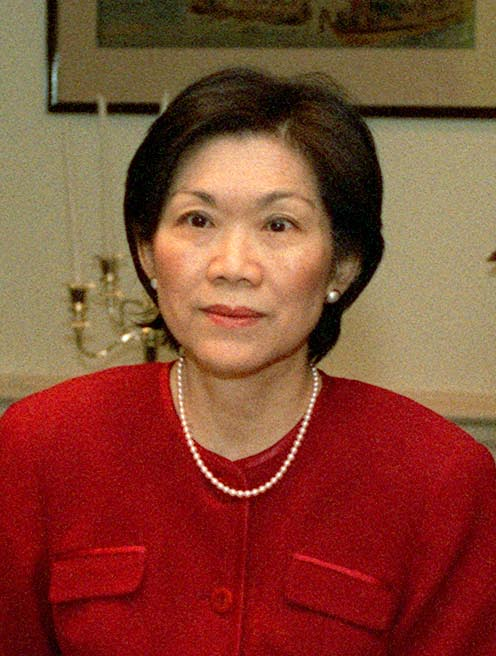
In her 1984 biography of Marshall, Chan Heng Chee (pictured) described him as a "shooting star" who "filled the sky with brilliance and disappeared".

Marshall's government has received both praise and criticism in scholarly analysis. For example, in criticism of Marshall, the writer Dennis Bloodworth described Marshall's government as having been "shaken" after the Hock Lee bus riots, while the historian Yeo Kim Wah called his policies during the civil unrest as "weak-kneed". Furthermore, historians Lee Ting Hui, C. M. Turnbull, and John Drysdale state that his relaxed policies led to uncontrolled growth of pro-communist organisations in Singapore. On the other hand, Yeo and Turnbull also praised Marshall for defying colonialism and his progress towards independence. Speaking on Marshall's 1955 constitutional crisis, Yeo stated that he had "deliberately created a crisis", while Drysdale called it "Marshall's Machiavellian challenge" to the British.

In her 1984 biography of Marshall, the academic Chan Heng Chee attributed Marshall's inability to hold office to be due to his internal rivalries and limitations of his fellow party members, along with his own impulsive tendencies. She explains that Marshall had neglected proper party-building following the LF's sudden entry into office. Chan considered Marshall to have been "far ahead of his party colleagues", and he only shared his troubles with Francis Thomas and Lim Yew Hock, whom he found to be trustworthy and helpful. Due to Marshall's dominance within his party, he tended to take charge of addressing the crises and issues confronting his administration; Chan describes his methods as "perceptibly autocratic".

In his 2003 book, the author Hussin Mutalib wrote that citizenship was "one of [Marshall's] more significant constitutional initiatives", despite its rejection. He opined that the proposal helped encourage political participation from the Chinese and Indian communities, who were traditionally uninterested in politics. In his 2008 biography on Marshall, Kevin Tan described the circumstances with which Marshall became chief minister "a marvel in itself". Tan considered Marshall's most important contributions to be getting more people to engage with politics via his anti-colonial speeches and empowering the population through various actions and policies.

James Low's analysis into Marshall's chief ministership using contemporary newspapers shows that Marshall consistently received support from the Chinese community as displayed through the Nanyang Siang Pau and Sin Chew Jit Poh. Particularly, the Chinese-language newspapers praised his decisions to establish Meet-the-People Sessions, the creation of the Labour Ordinance, and his lack of police action in the riots and strikes of 1955. Marshall's 1955 constitutional crisis was met with mixed responses in the press; for example, Sin Chew Jit Poh supported the issue, while Tamil Murasu viewed it negatively. Newspapers highly praised his success in easing trade restrictions between Singapore and Indonesia, with Low considering the "unanimous compliments" as "the peak of Marshall's government".
