= Kevin Tan (academic) =

Singaporean legal academic

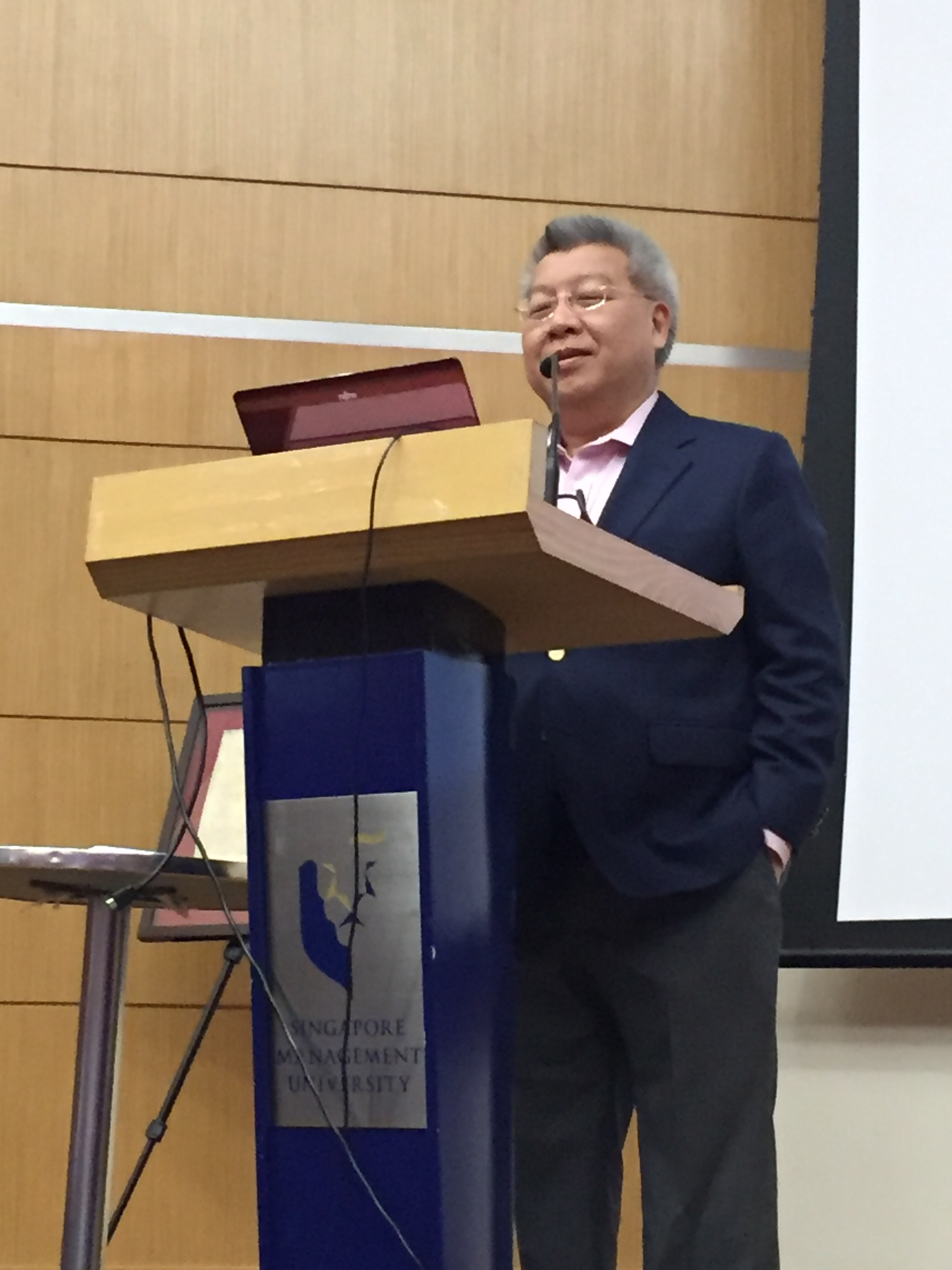
Tan in 2015

Kevin Tan Yew Lee (born 1962) is a Singaporean legal academic. A scholar of Singaporean constitutional law and history, Tan teaches at the National University of Singapore and Nanyang Technological University.

== Early life and education ==
Tan studied at Farrer Primary School and then Raffles Institution. He graduated from the National University of Singapore with a Bachelor of Laws and Yale Law School with masters and doctoral degrees in law.

== Career ==
In 1986, Tan joined the National University of Singapore Faculty of Law.

In March 1999, he was elected the president of the non-partisan policy discussion group, The Roundtable.

In July, on the issue of elected elected presidency of Singapore, Tan said to The Straits Times "The trouble is: either the President should be a figurehead President, or an executive President. To do a little bit of both is terribly confusing." It was rebutted by Prime Minister of Singapore Goh Chok Tong that the elected president is a custodial role and has no executive powers. Senior Minister of Singapore Lee Kuan Yew also criticised Tan's comments.

In 2000, Tan resigned his university post, among five others, after 14 years with NUS to join a private investment company.

In March 2025, Tan proposed for independent elections within the commission to advocate fairness in the elections in Singapore.

As of March 2026, Tan is currently Adjunct Professor at the NUS Faculty of Law, and Senior Fellow at the S Rajaratnam School of International Studies, Nanyang Technological University.

== Select publications ==
- Kevin Y. L. Tan (2019). International Law, History & Policy: Singapore in the Early Years (PDF). NUS Centre for International Law. ISBN 9789811416163.
- Tan, Kevin Yew Lee; Thio, Li-ann (2010), Constitutional Law in Malaysia and Singapore (3rd ed.), Singapore: LexisNexis, ISBN 978-981-236-795-2
- Thio, Li-ann; Tan, Kevin Y L, eds. (2009), Evolution of a Revolution: Forty Years of the Singapore Constitution, Singapore: Routledge-Cavendish, ISBN 978-0-415-43862-9
- Kevin Y[ew] L[ee] Tan, ed. (1999), The Singapore Legal System (2nd ed.), Singapore: Singapore University Press, ISBN 978-9971-69-212-4
