= Eunos =

Eunos may refer to:

- Eunos (automobile), a brand of vehicles made by Mazda
- Eunos Group Representation Constituency, a defunct GRC ward in Singapore
- Eunos MRT station, an above-ground Mass Rapid Transit station in Singapore
- The alternative name for Geylang East, a subzone of the town of Geylang in Singapore
  - Jalan Eunos, a local street in Geylang East
