= H. J. C. Kulasingha =

Singaporean politician and merchant (1900–1982)

H. J. C. Kulasingha OBE BBM
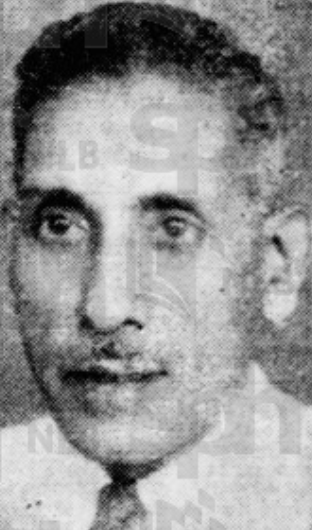

Member of the Legislative Council for Bukit Timah Constituency
- In office 10 April 1951 – 5 February 1955
- Preceded by: Constituency established
- Succeeded by: Lim Chin Siong (as legislative assemblyman)

Personal details
- Born: Hollupatherage James Caldera Kulasingha; 4 January 1900 Matara, British Ceylon
- Died: 8 December 1982 (aged 82) Singapore
- Citizenship: Singaporean
- Party: Progressive Party (1950–1958)
- Occupation: Politician

Hollupatherage James Caldera Kulasingha OBE BBM (4 January 1900 – 8 December 1982) was a Singaporean politician and merchant who served as the chairman of the Pasir Panjang Rural District Committee and as a member of the Singapore Rural Board from 1949 to 1959. A member of the Progressive Party, he was elected to the Legislative Council of Singapore in 1951 representing the constituency of Bukit Timah.

He contested the Southern Islands Constituency seat in the 1955 Singaporean general election as a member of the Progressive Party, losing the election by a narrow margin. After the Progressive Party's defeat in the election, it merged with the Democratic Party to form the Liberal Socialist Party and Kulasingha was elected its vice-chairman. However, he and over a hundred other members left the party shortly before the 1959 Singaporean general election. He then unsuccessfully contested the Pasir Panjang Constituency in the election as an independent.

Nicknamed the "King of Southern Islands", Kulasingha was known for his contributions to the region, for which he was conferred the Order of the British Empire in 1955.

== Early life and education ==
A Sinhalese, Kulasingha was born in the town of Matara in Ceylon on 4 January 1900. His father was a merchant who manufactured rope and he had an older brother and a younger sister. He received his education at a Christian mission school run by the Church of England Mission and completed the Junior Cambridge examinations. Although his father was a Buddhist, Kulasingha was sent to the mission school as he would not be able to learn English otherwise, and learning the language was necessary for a job under the British. His father died when he was 8 or 9 years old, after which the family was supported by the inheritance received and his uncle. He joined the scouts in sixth or seventh standard. In his teenage years, grew disillusioned with the local Caste system, which eventually led him to emigrate to British Malaya. He also converted to Christianity around this time. After graduating, he began working at an office as a clerk. Kulasingha left Ceylon for Singapore when he was 18 without telling his family, who would have forbidden him to leave, and with the help of his friends. Despite this, he remained in contact with his family.

== Career ==
Kulasingha remained in Singapore for 2–3 months unsuccessfully looking for a job at a commercial firm. He then left for Kuala Lumpur by train after hearing that there may be more opportunities there instead. He was then hired as a junior clerk at a local firm. After a year, he left to join the firm Cumberbatch & Co. as the boss of the first firm was "not very pleasant". He started at the company as a junior clerk. In March 1927, Kulasingha was elected honorary secretary of a committee of Buddhists in Kuala Lumpur opposing the screening of the film The Light of Asia as it would "injure the religious susceptibilities of those who profess the Buddhist religion". He was put in charge of the insurance department of Cumberbatch & Co. in 1938 or 1939. In November 1939, he was elected to the committee of the newly formed Sinhalese Association of the Federated Malay States which aimed to raise funds for the Malayan Patriotic Fund, a war charity. He also served as the Patriotic Fund's secretary and organised the Sinhalese Women's Sewing League, which aimed to provide clothing to those who had lost their homes in bombings. Kulasingha was appointed the honorary secretary of the Association of Non-Government Employees in Kuala Lumpur.

Kulasingha fled to Singapore, by train around December 1941 as he feared the Kempeitai. He went to live with his brother-in-law on Havelock Road and remained in Singapore even during the Japanese Occupation of Singapore. While in Singapore, he visited his boss, who had been detained as a prisoner of war. He was given a letter authorising the organisation of the office. Around six months before the Japanese surrender and the subsequent end of the occupation, Kulasingha fled to Pengerang in Johor. While there, he began working either as an assistant at a rubber estate or as a market gardener in a "lonely district". After the occupation, he returned to Singapore and began living in a "rattan house" in Pasir Panjang. He founded a business in 1946 with two other partners, Sinhalese he had met during the occupation, with each of them investing $1000. Kulasingha himself managed the business. The firm, located on Anson Road was a forwarding agent which supplied security guards to ships. There were initially only two to three competitors. However, many more organisations offering similar services were formed around 1948 to 1949, leading to stiff competition. His workers began unionising in this period, although the company remained profitable. He claimed to have met "reasonable" demands by the unions and that the "unreasonable" demands were "scrapped" by them. The firm continued to perform well until the early 1960s. However, competition had grown heavily by the mid-1960s, as had the salaries. Despite this, he claimed that the firm was never "at the loss" and that business was "not bad" following Singapore's gaining of independence in 1965.

=== Pasir Panjang Rural District Committee and the Singapore Rural Board (1948 – 1959) ===
By May 1948, Kulasingha had become the chairman of the Pasir Panjang Village Committee, a Rural District Committee which also oversaw the Southern Islands. Initially, he did not receive payment as chairman. He would make trips to the Southern Islands weekly or fortnightly. As chairman, he visited the islands on two separate calls in May to assess the living conditions on the islands, which were in a state of "neglect". Reportedly, one of the islands faced poor fresh water supply, many children were forced to travel long distances on sampans to attend a Malay school on Pulau Seraya and medically, residents received only one visit from a nursing sister every fortnight. He recommended that government storage tanks be installed on the islands, that a pre-war structure on the islands be converted into a hospital, that the Fisheries Department should "sponsor schemes to improve the methods of fishing" and that poultry farming among the residents be encouraged. In July, he suggested that a fire station be built to serve the villages on Pulau Brani and that the free ferry service between the island and mainland Singapore be "resuscitated" as residents could not afford the 25-cent fare for a ferry. In August, he claimed that he would "complain" to the Rural Board about how the Pasir Panjang area lacked a post office and a "through" bus service. By September, the committee had been renamed the Pasir Panjang Rural District Committee.

By February 1949, Kulasingha had become a member of the Special Voluntary Constable, established by the committee and comprising locals. Kulasingha wrote to the Rural Board in May, suggesting that a Chinese-language school be built behind the Alexandra Road Police Station as, according to him, around 400 children in the area did not have a school to go to. In the same month, Kulasingha was appointed a member of the Rural Board in place of the recently deceased Cheong Hock Chye. In September, he lodged a "protest" against an experimental fish pond around the residences of 10 families in the area, which had resulted in 12 cases of children falling into the pond and the residents being unable to move forward with renovations. He successfully advocated for the cost of night soil removal services to not increase. He was re-appointed to the Singapore Rural Board as an unofficial member for 1950. By February 1950, he had been elected the vice-president of the Singapore Sinhalese Association, and unsuccessfully advocated for the flying of the Ceylonese flag in Singapore on the independence day of the Dominion of Ceylon. He had also become a member of the Progressive Party, as he was in favour of Singapore gradually gaining independence. Later that month, Kulasingha successfully secured $4000 and 15 acres of land along Lim Chu Kang Road as compensation to a group of 150 squatters who were left homeless after their homes along Coronation Road were demolished to make way for a housing estate. He had taken a "personal interest" in their case. In March, he was elected a committee member of the Progressive Party. Kulasingha was "instrumental in bringing about the Sino-Malay cooperation" for the funding and the construction of a school on Pulau Semakau which opened in April. By then, he had also become the president of the Singapore Sinhalese Association. In the same month, he was appointed the Rural Board's representative on a committee which would "advise the Government on the sitting of community radio receiving sets."

In July 1950, Percy Joseph of The Singapore Standard wrote that if "any one man" could be credited with Pasir Panjang's "remarkable growth" it would be Kulasingha. According to Joseph, Kulasingha was then visiting the islands in the area once a month. He had proposed that a community hall be built along Buona Vista Road. This hall, which was to be completed later that year, was the first community hall on the island to be built in a village. Joseph claimed that Kulasingha often served as a "mediator" or "magistrate" for Pasir Panjang residents. Kulasingha had also started two evening classes teaching English to adults with plans for a third and in the midst of setting up another school on the islands for the children of Malay fishermen in the area. The first two English classes were held at the Tanglin Tinggi Malay School as the Anglo-Malay Evening School. The first was founded in January while the second was established in April. When it was announced that Pasir Panjang would be receiving a post office only in 1951, Kulasingha criticised the delay, opining that the area, which then had around 30,000 residents, "badly" required a post office. The third English class, held at the Hua Chiau Chinese School was opened by John Le Provost, the Adult Education Officer, in August. In the same month, the Sinhalese Association adopted a crest which he had designed. The following month, he was appointed to the Council of Adult Education and the committee to "consider the provision of bus shelters." In December, he was re-elected to the Rural Board for a three-year term.

In January, a school which could hold a maximum of 25 students built by both the local Chinese and Malay communities on Pulau Semakau was opened. Kulasingha wrote a proposal suggesting that the Pasir Panjang Rural District Committee become the first such committee in Singapore to elect its members, which he submitted to the chairman of the Rural Board in February 1951. In his plan, 12 of the committee's 15 members would be elected at a public meeting while the remaining three, of which two would be local Penghulus, would be nominated by the elected members instead. The proposal specified that only those who could speak both English and Malay and who had lived in Singapore for at least 10 years and in Pasir Panjang for at least 3 years would be allowed to stand for election. He had become a member of the Local Produce Working Committee by that month. In March, Kulasingha stated that he was planning to expand the Pulau Semakau school's capacity to 40 to 50 students as the residents of Pulau Sudong, Pulau Sebarok and Pulau Senang wished to send their children to the school. He had also sought permission from the government to either found an English school on Pulau Brani or to hold afternoon English classes at the island's Malay school due to a "growing demand" for English education, resulting in some of the island's residents choosing to travel to Singapore for classes instead. Kulasingha noted that this was "very expensive" to the residents, who were largely "poor", and alternatively suggested that a school be built on Pulau Blakang Mati. In May, a spokesperson with the Rural Board confirmed that the proposal had been accepted and that rural district committees could hold elections to decide, though Kulasingha decided not to hold elections that year.

In May, Kulasingha announced that his proposal for a community hall along Buona Vista was accepted and that the former site of Pasir Panjang Park, on which the Japanese had erected three buildings, would be acquired by the government and used as a temporary community centre as the community hall building was built. However, in June, he claimed that the army, which had occupied Pasir Panjang Park since the end of the Japanese occupation, was delaying the acquisition of the site intended for the community hall. Kulasingha was appointed to one of two advisory committees created by the government to "advise the Price controller regarding goods used for food for human consumption and all other goods. At a Rural Board meeting on 16 August, he complained that his reports on inconveniently-sited bus stops in the area had been ignored and that while the army had agreed to relinquish the land, the site was then taken over by the Singapore Police Force instead and converted into police quarters. He asked that at least one of the buildings on the site be converted into a community hall. In September, it was announced that one of three buildings in Pasir Panjang Park would be converted into a community hall and that the inconveniently-located bus stops had already been resited. He also became a patron of the football team Pulau Brani United F.C. In November, Kulasingha urged the Rural Board to look into frequent flooding at a kampong along Coronation Road.

In January 1952, Kulasingha announced that the building which had been handed over to the district for a community hall was in a "very poor condition" and would need "expensive" repairs, which the Public Works Department had begun preparing estimates for. However, he opposed demolishing any part of the building as space was "needed badly". By March, he was put in charge of aiding the renewing of identity cards by providing those seeking a renewal with an authorisation chit to the Registration Office on Stamford Road. The Singapore Free Press reported then that his office along Anson Road was "swamped by hundreds of people daily". After Kulasingha complained that there were no official boundaries for the different rural districts, he was appointed in June to a three-man committee with fellow board member Goh Tong Liang and Harry Laurence Ward, the Chief Surveyor, to decide on the boundaries. In the same month, the Rural Board appointed him to the Coronation Celebrations Committee established by the government. It was announced in July that the Rural Board was negotiating with the army for 12 acres of land in Pasir Panjang for the construction for a community centre. In December, the Singapore Standard reported that residents of the islands might be receiving firefighting equipment due to efforts made by Kulasingha. In the same month, he asked for the board to consider renaming Tanjong Kling, a village, as the term "kling" had since become an ethnic slur.

In January 1953, it was announced that Kulasingha had been nominated the Rural Board's representative on the Singapore Sports Stadium Board. He proposed in May that the board serve as a housing authority for rural areas and build houses to be sold for around $3000 and rented out for $25 a month each, utilising land which was unsuitable for farming. He believed that the government provide the board with $1,000,000 a year for three years for the project, of which $100,000 would be spent on roads while the rest would be used to construct the houses. He estimated that the board would have to build around 13,000 houses a year for a decade to satisfy the residents of rural areas and suggested that the board's building department be expanded to hire additional staff, including private architects. The Straits Times reported in July that the army continued to refuse to sell the land at the former Pasir Panjang Park and Kulasingha confirmed that the original plans for a community hall, drawn up in 1949, were now "obsolete" and suggested looking for a different site instead. By then, he had become a member of the Singapore Passenger Transport Committee as a member of the Rural Board. In October, Kulasingha suggested that Tanjong Kling be renamed Tanjong Kalinga, after the legendary kingdom. Rural Board chairman Edward Victor Grace Day noted that the origin of the island's name was then unknown and that it may have been derived from a keramat in the area. Following complaints by Kulasingha about the lack of bus lines servicing the Tanjong Kling and Boon Lay Road areas, a line operated by the Green Bus Company serving the areas was announced in November. In December, he claimed that he had received complaints for "making noise on little things" and threatened to "make bigger noises" if the "little things" were not resolved. He also accused the government of ignoring the Rural Board on decisions regarding rural areas.

In January 1954, Kulasingha was elected the Rural Board's representative on the Board of the Singapore Improvement Trust. He was also appointed a visitor to the St John's Island Quarantine Station for the year. By May, construction on a community centre on 15 acres of land at the junction of Pasir Panjang Road and Buona Vista Road had begun. The Singapore Free Press then credited various improvements in the area, including the community centre, to Kulasingha. In June, following the publication of the Rendel Constitutional Committee report, he initiated a motion to ensure that unexpended money given out as part of government grants would not be returned and instead remain with the board for the funding of projects in rural areas. By then, the Rural Board had been merged with the City Council of Singapore. The motion was defeated with 14 votes to 2. He officially opened the Pasir Panjang Post Office on 1 July. In December, the Singapore Standard reported that Kulasingha had been successfully in convincing the government to grant five scholarships to children living on islands off the coast of Singapore, to be selected by the Election Department. In February 1955, he founded a boys' club housed in a building in Pasir Panjang Park, serving as its honorary patron. He was conferred the OBE in June for his contributions to rural areas. In August, Kulasingha urged the government to impose a heavy tax on gambling machines and pinball tables to counter what he described as a "growing menace to the younger generation of this Colony." Aster Gunasekera of the Singapore Standard reported that the leaders of various local youth organisations had supported Kulasingha's proposal, though Tom Pearson Cromwell, the director of the Social Welfare Department, called it "paradoxical" and instead suggested providing more support for youth organisations for more recreational facilities for youths. The following month, he initiated a motion for the government to ban or control pinball tables which received unanimous support from the Rural Board.

On 17 October 1956, the Buona Vista Park and the Buona Vista Community Centre, located on the former location of Pasir Panjang Park, were officially opened after the army had finally agreed to derequisition the land in 1953. Kulasingha was elected the community centre's president in February of the following year. In October 1958, Kulasingha was appointed to a special committee of the Singapore Improvement Trust which was to inquire into the system by which the organisation allocated flats. He had left the Rural Board by February 1960.

=== Legislative Council (1951 – 1955) ===
In January 1951, Kulasingha was announced the Progressive Party candidate for the constituency of Bukit Timah, which included the Southern Islands, in the upcoming general election to be held in April. He later claimed in an interview that he had run for the Legislative Council as he believed that he did not have enough of a say in the Rural Board. The following month, The Straits Times reported that "observers" believed that he was "practically certain to win." In early March, it was announced that Kulasingha would be running against Labour Party candidate Valiya Purayil Abdullah, a public worker and the managing-editor of the Kerala Bandhu. Kulasingha stated that he believed that democracy "could be fostered in Singapore only through adherence to a party programme and party discipline." He then "promised" the residents of the district that he would "direct his efforts to securing better housing, cheaper fuel and food" if elected. On 2 April, Abdullah accused Kulasingha of "using his influence" as a Rural Board member to gain votes. The former also accused the latter of using this influence to "cause" the removal of his election posters from some buses. The Straits Times then reported that as part of his campaign, Kulasingha had already travelled over a hundred miles by water to visit the residents of the Southern Islands, and that the key issues for voters in the district were the need for "more schools, more medical facilities and better living conditions." Kulasingha won the election with 1,311 votes and a 428 vote majority. The newly-reconstituted Legislative Council of Singapore was ceremonially opened by Governor Sir Franklin Gimson at the Victoria Memorial Hall on 17 April 1951.

Kulasingha retrospectively claimed that he had "nothing much" to do as Legislative Councillor as he was already a member of the Rural Board. He was re-elected to the committee of the Progressive Party in June. In August, he suggested that hawkers be removed from five-foot ways and that parking along both sides of main roads be banned in order to "solve Singapore's traffic problem." In October, the Singapore Standard reported that Kulasingha was the only councillor thus far who had "drawn attention" to the 200% to 300% increase in the rentals payable for the nearly 7,000 farmers with temporary occupation licenses. After a plea to the council for a postal office in Pasir Panjang, a postal agency was opened in the area on 1 November. Later that month, he was appointed to a newly-established Officers Selection Board. In December, Kulasingha was among three councillors who criticised the rent laws, which allowed landlords to evict a tenant if the latter had failed to pay rent 21 days after they were required to. He was appointed to the Singapore Civil Defence Advisory Committee in February 1952. In June, he was appointed to a Select Committee of the council for the Wages Council Bill. At a council meeting in August, Kulasingha urged the government to lay buoys to indicate the maritime boundaries in the Durian Straits and to introduce one or two patrol boats in the area to guard fishermen as several fishermen been arrested by Indonesian authorities while fishing in international waters or near Indonesia's maritime boundary in the past seven months. He also asked for increases in the allowances for beneficiaries of the Widows' and Orphans' Pension Fund, as well as for more homes for the aged and destitute. In March 1953, Kulasingha was appointed to a sub-committee formed to investigate the potential banning of trishaws in the City area.

Kulasingha received the Queen Elizabeth II Coronation Medal in June 1953. In November, Kulasingha was appointed to a committee established by the Rendel Commission to "consider the functions and powers of local government authorities in Singapore". Following the passing of the Cinematograph Films Ordinance 1953 on 15 December, he was appointed to the newly established Committee of Appeal. As a member of the Legislative Council, he was appointed to the Singapore Film Appeals Committee in January 1954. He was a member of the four-man delegation, along with fellow Singapore Legislative Councillor Caralapati Raghaviah Dasaratha Raj, Federal Legislative Councillor Toh Eng Hoe, and Othman Mohamad, then the Menteri Besar of Selangor, sent to represent Malaya the fourth regional conference of the Commonwealth Parliamentary Association, held in Kuching in April. In the same month, he urged that the government reconsider accepting the Rendel Commission, claiming that it would "further deny" residents of rural areas the "benefits of community life and organisation", and that the seven Rural District Committees had agreed with him on the matter. Following the second reading of the Midwives (Amendment) Bill in the Legislative Council, which would potentially lead to the formation of a Central Midwives' Board, Kulasingha was appointed to a Select Committee for the bill. In December, he urged the government to establish a home for those suffering from "incurable diseases".

=== 1955 and 1959 general elections ===
It was announced in September 1954 that Kulasingha would be running for re-election in the 1955 Singaporean general election, to be held in April. He was to contest in a rural area. He was to contest the newly-created Southern Islands Constituency. It was announced in October that Kulasingha was to contest against Tengku Muda Mohammed, who was listed as a member of the newly-established Labour Front. However, Inche Sidik, then president of the Malay Union, claimed in November that Mohammed was a member of the Union. The Singapore Free Press reported that the latter "could not be contacted". By February 1955, it had been confirmed that Kulasingha would instead be contesting against Inche Sidik of the Union, which had by then allied with the United Malays National Organisation and the Malaysian Chinese Association. However, he lost to Inche Sidik by 28 votes, receiving 1205 votes while Inche Sidik had received 1233 votes. This was the narrowest margin in the entire election. Kulasingha later claimed to believe that Inche Sidik had won as he was both Malay and Muslim, which meant that a significant portion of the Malay vote went to the latter instead, and that the loss affected neither his political career nor his position within the Progressive Party, though he was "very much disappointed". At the Progressive Party's annual conference held in June, he was re-elected a member of the Progressive Party's General Committee. The following month, he was appointed to a 10-man committee established by the government to scrap the Rendel Plan for a City and Island Council and examine proposals "for the future organisation of local government in Singapore."

In October 1955, Kulasingha and fellow Progressive party member S. M. Vasagar issued a joint statement criticising party member Ameer Jumabhoy's use of a clenched fist while shouting 'Merdeka', which had become associated with Communism in Singapore, at a party meeting. The following month, Kulasingha and Vasagar were successful in pushing for the banning of the use of the clenched fist gesture by party members. In February 1956, the Progressive Party merged with the Democratic Party to form the Liberal Socialist Party. He claimed to have supported the merger as he believed that the aims of the parties were similar. Following the merger, he was among the nine men elected by the Progressive Party to the general council of the newly-formed party. By July, he and Vasagar were reportedly still organising Meet-the-People Sessions with residents of at least seven different areas. In May 1957, Kulasingha and Thio Chan Bee were elected the party's vice-chairmen. In September, he was appointed to a subelection committee which was to decide on the party's candidates for the upcoming Singapore City Council election, to be held at the end of the year. In October 1958, it was announced that Kulasingha would be among the Liberal-Socialist Party members contesting in the upcoming general election, to be held early next year. In November, he acted as the party's chairman after a wave of resignations amongst various members of the party, including former central council chairman Ng See Thong, who had left to join the newly-formed Singapore People's Alliance. He was re-elected to the party's central council that month. By March of the following year, he had been elected the chairman of the party's executive committee.

Kulasingha successfully pushed in early April for the party to join the anti-People's Action Party alliance between the Singapore People's Alliance, the UMNO and the Malaysian Chinese Association for the upcoming election. However, this decision was reversed later that month, which led to a dispute within the party. The nominating of the Liberal-Socialist Party's candidates for the upcoming general election was also repeatedly delayed, resulting in potential candidates being unable to do ground work. As such, Kulasingha, along with 102 other members, decided to leave the party. The resigned members announced that they intended to form an independent group which would join the alliance. Kulasingha then announced that he would contest the Pasir Panjang Constituency in the election as an independent. Some of the election workers who had aided him in previous elections returned to work with him on his campaign. His opponents in the election were Tee Kim Leng of the People's Action Party, Sukaimi bin Ibrahim of the UMNO and S. T. V. Lingam, who was also running as an independent. The Straits Times reported that it was a "well known secret" that Kulasingha would receive the support of both the Singapore Democratic Alliance and the Liberal-Socialist Party. He lost the election, coming in second with 1,884 votes behind Tee, who had won with a majority of 239 votes.

=== Post-political career ===
Kulasingha retired from the firm he had founded in 1967, after which the company shut down. In June 1970, Kulasingha was elected the vice-president of the management committee of the National Employers' Council. By May 1971, he had become the director of the Jurong Bird Park. His primary contribution to the park was in landscaping, which was a hobby of his. In August 1972, he received the Bintang Bakti Masyarakat. He was then sitting on the park's board of directors.

== Personal life and death ==
Kulasingha married in Malacca on 26 January 1929. He had an adopted daughter. In January 1960, Kulasingha was residing at 331 Pasir Panjang Road. He later moved in with the family of D. S. Kannangara, a business partner of his, who lived on Neo Pee Teck Lane in Pasir Panjang. Kulasingha was reportedly "affectionately" referred to by Pasir Panjang residents as "chairman" and was nicknamed the "King of Southern Islands".

Kulasingha was active within the local scouting movement and was elected the president of the South District of the Singapore Boy Scouts Association in August 1951. He was re-elected the chairman of the South-West District of the Singapore Boy Scouts Association in May 1953.

Kulasingha held a motor speedboat race, held off Pasir Panjang on 15 February 1953. Interest in the race was reportedly "so widespread" that it led to him establishing an organising committee. The following month, he was elected the vice-president of the Outboard Boating Club of Singapore at its inaugural meeting. He became a patron of the National Badminton Party in February 1954. In April 1958, he was elected the treasurer of the Singapore Federation of Girls' Clubs.

Kulasingha died at Alexandra Hospital on 8 December 1982, after which his body was cremated at the Mount Vernon Columbarium and Crematorium complex.
