= Masjid Darul Aman =

Mosque located in Geylang East, Singapore

Masjid Darul Aman مسجد دار الأمان
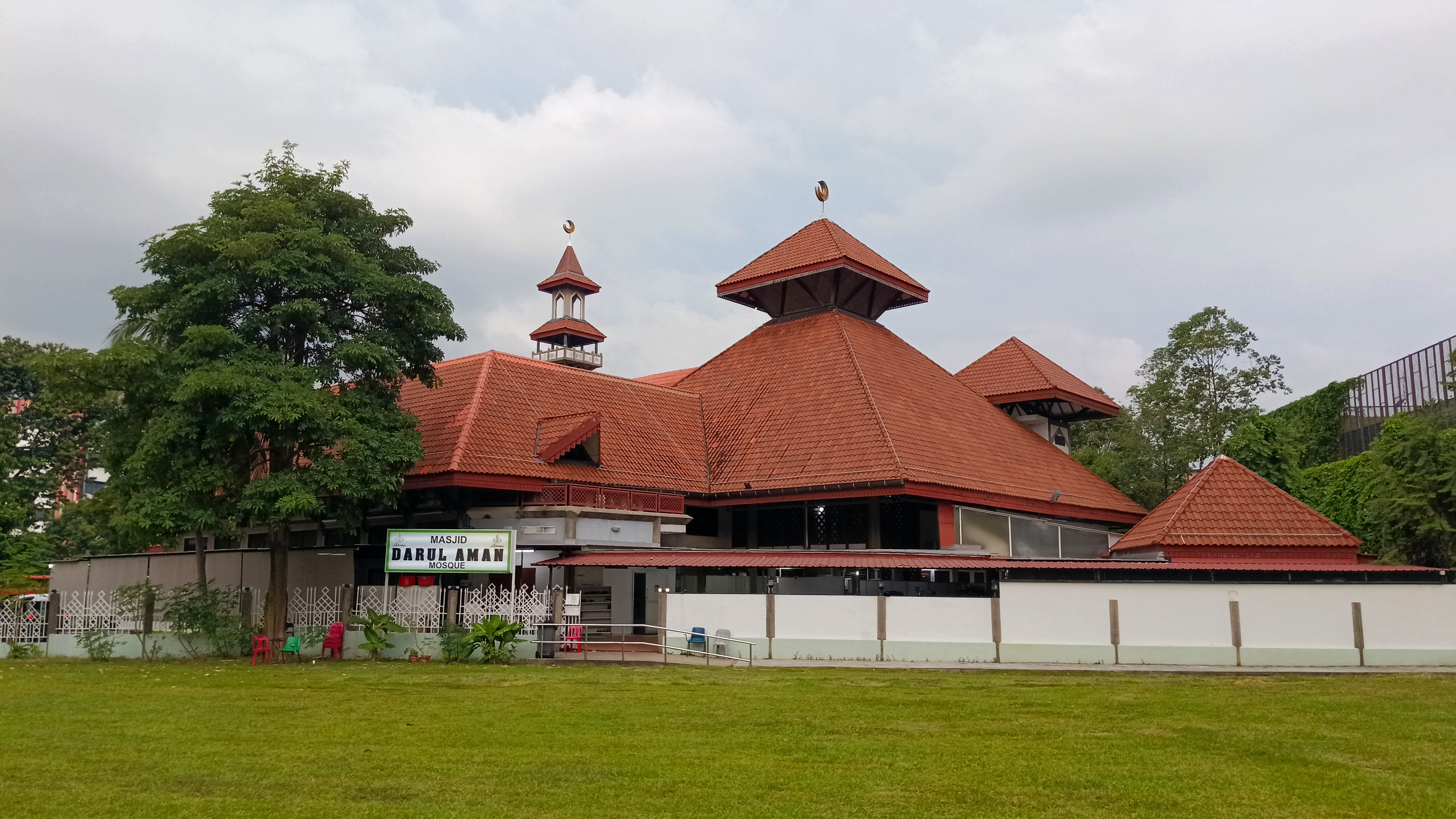
- Northern facade and entrance of Masjid Darul Aman, facing Sims Avenue.

- Location in Singapore

Religion
- Affiliation: Sunni Islam

Location
- Location: 1 Jalan Eunos, Singapore 419493
- Country: Singapore
- Coordinates: 1.3179°N 103.9046°E

Architecture
- Type: Mosque
- Style: Eclectic
- Established: 1983
- Completed: 1986

Specifications
- Minaret: 1
- Minaret height: 2.6 m
- Site area: 3,561 m²
- Designated as NHL: Aga Khan Award for Architecture (1989)

Masjid Darul Aman is a mosque located in Geylang East, Singapore. Built in 1986, it replaces an older mosque situated in the same place. The mosque was designed by architects from the Housing and Development Board (HDB) and has won the Architects Award in 1987 and was shortlisted for the Aga Khan Award for Architecture in 1989.

== Etymology ==
The name of the mosque, Darul Aman, is a romanized Malay version of the Arabic term Dār al-Amān (دار الأمان) which is translated in the English language to "Abode of Peace."

== History ==
Originally, a small mosque known as Masjid Aminah stood at the site in Geylang East. It was built in 1959 and named for its founder, an Indian Muslim businesswoman named Aminah who hailed from Palembang. Masjid Aminah, due to its small size, was unable to accommodate more worshippers for its Friday prayers and festive events, hence plans for a new, larger mosque to replace it were made in 1981. This mosque was officially named Masjid Darul Aman in 1982 and its construction was placed under the second phase of the Mosque Building Fund, an initiative from the Majlis Ugama Islam Singapura (MUIS). The plot which Masjid Darul Aman would be built on, a few metres away from Masjid Aminah, was also unveiled to the public in 1983. Design plans for the new mosque were unveiled in 1984, showing that the mosque would now be designed in a style more reminiscent of traditional Javanese architecture. Architects from the Housing and Development Board (HDB) had also been hired to design the layout and structure of the mosque. Construction on the mosque officially began on 21 June 1984, after the foundation stone for the mosque had been laid at the chosen site.

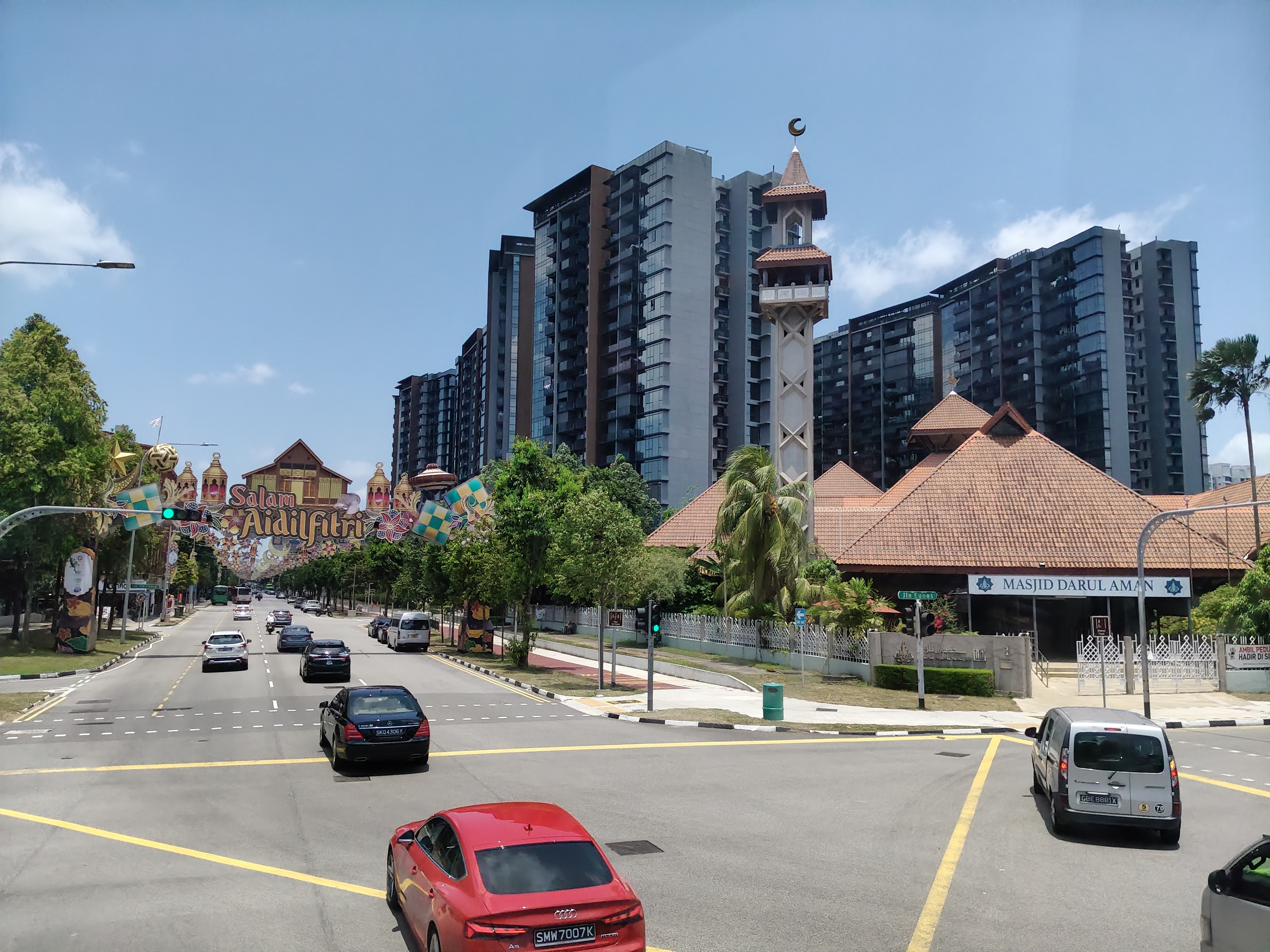
Masjid Darul Aman during the Eid al-Fitr celebrations in Geylang, with Eid decorations along Changi Road.

Masjid Darul Aman was completed in 1986 and was officially opened in May of that year. The mosque was officially inaugurated by the MUIS on 3 August 1986. The first Eid prayer was also held in the mosque on 16 August in the same year. The older mosque, Masjid Aminah, was still active, although most of its usual congregation had already moved to the newer Masjid Darul Aman. Masjid Aminah would continue to be active until late 1987/early 1988, when it was demolished to be replaced by Masjid Darul Aman.

Masjid Darul Aman was nominated for the Architects Award of the Singapore Institute for Architects (SIA) in 1986, emerging as a winner on 14 February 1987. It was also nominated for the Aga Khan Award for Architecture in 1989, which it also won.

== Architecture ==
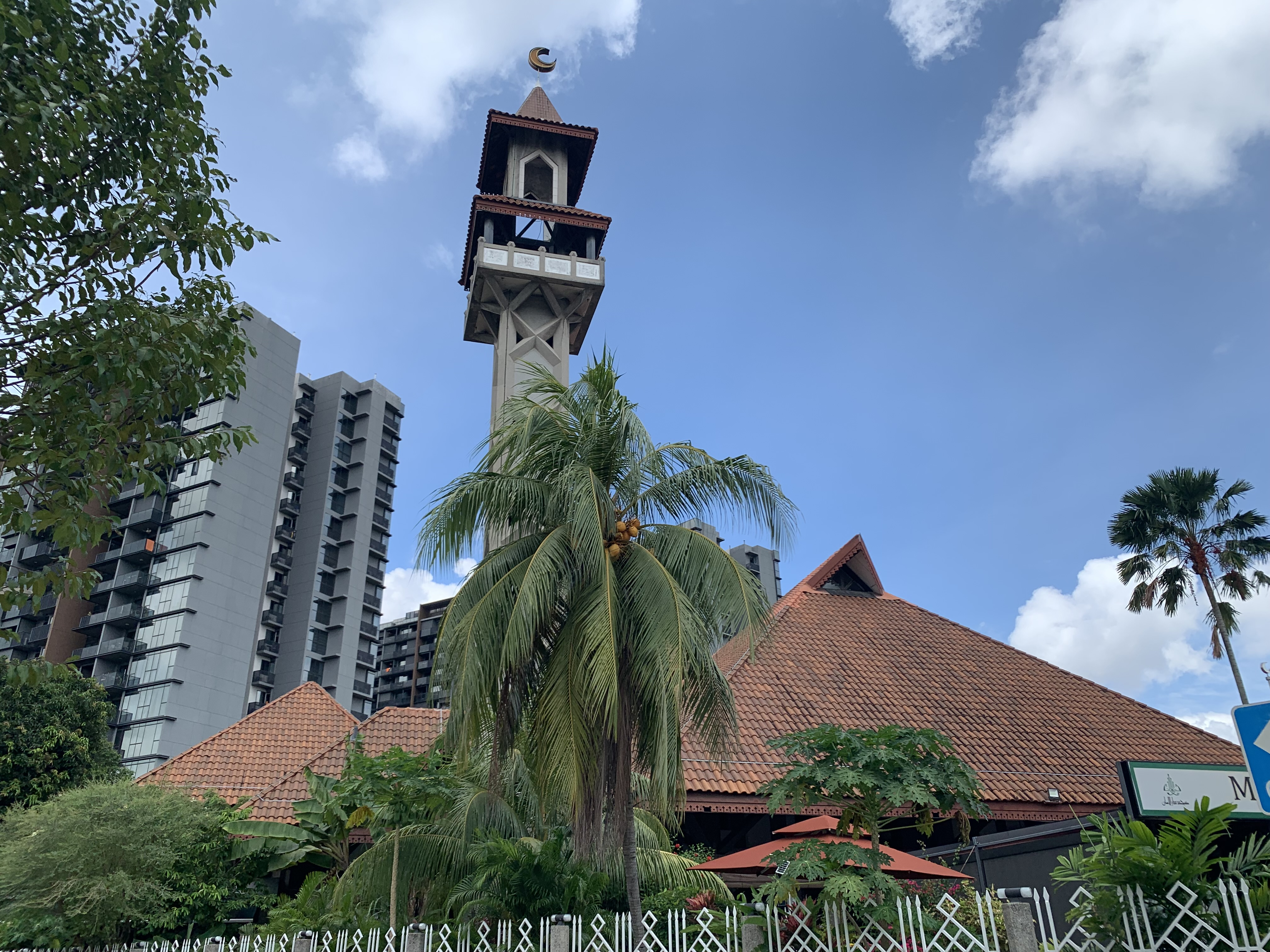
Main entrance of the mosque, with the minaret in the foreground.

The architectural style of the mosque is eclectic and combines Javanese and Minangkabau styles, while its appearance is modelled after Javanese mosques such as the Great Mosque of Demak. The central core of the mosque, its main prayer hall, is three stories high and topped by a double pyramidal roof, with the inside having geometric patterns made from wooden beams. The mosque is also positioned diagonal from Changi Road, in order to face the direction of Mecca. The interior of the prayer hall is fully carpeted, while the wooden ornate mihrab was crafted by artisans in Indonesia and shipped to Singapore.

The three-storey minaret of the mosque is built from concrete and is 2.6 metres high, intended to be of the same height with the neighbouring HDB flats. At the top is a balcony, topped with a pyramidal roof with a crescent atop. The base of the minaret is also used as a storehouse and is inaccessible for the general public.

The HDB was the main architectural firm and also manager of the mosque construction project, with their architects Tony Tan and Mohamed Asaduz Zaman designing the layout and blueprints of the mosque. Masjid Darul Aman is hence one of six mosques designed by the HDB, the others being Masjid Al-Ansar at Bedok, Masjid Al-Muttaqin at Ang Mo Kio, Masjid An-Nur at Woodlands, Masjid Muhajirin at Braddell Road and Masjid Mujahidin at Queenstown; An-Nur being the most recent and the last HDB project, before the HDB retired from mosque development.

== Transportation ==
Masjid Darul Aman is situated at the junction of Jalan Eunos and Changi Road, while being in walking distance from the Eunos MRT station on the East–West line.

== See also ==
- Masjid Khalid, another mosque in Geylang East
- Masjid Kassim, also situated along Changi Road
- List of mosques in Singapore
