= Bukit Timah Single Member Constituency =

Former electoral division in Singapore

Coordinates: 1.320°N 103.75°E

Bukit Timah
- Former single-member constituency for the Parliament of Singapore
- Region: Central Region, Singapore
- Electorate: 26,951 (2001)

Former constituency
- Created: 1951; 75 years ago
- Abolished: 2006; 20 years ago
- Seats: 1
- Created from: Rural West (1951); Bukit Timah GRC (2001)
- Replaced by: Bukit Timah GRC (1997); Holland–Bukit Timah GRC (2006)

Bukit Timah Single Member Constituency (SMC) was a single member constituency in Bukit Timah, Singapore. It was formerly known as Bukit Timah Constituency before 1988.

== History ==
In 1951, Rural West Constituency was renamed as Bukit Timah constituency.

In 1955, the constituency was broken up to form various constituencies, Bukit Panjang, Pasir Panjang, Queenstown, Sembawang and Southern Islands SMC. In 1959, it was further broken up to form Jurong Constituency.

On 8 December 1965, about four months into independence, Barisan Sosialis (BS) began to boycott Parliament in response to the current legislature and its democracy as "phony". Members of Parliament from BS started resigning from parliament with incumbent MP of Bukit Timah Constituency, Lee Tee Tong, resigning on 7 October 1965. A by-election was called with Chor Yeok Eng from PAP winning the seat uncontested.

In 1972, the constituency was broken up to form Bukit Batok Constituency, followed by in 1980 distributed to Ayer Rajah, Clementi and West Coast constituencies with the growing development of Clementi, and in 1984 to Yuhua and Hong Kah constituencies with the growing development of Jurong East.

In 1988, following the establishment of group representation constituency (GRC) and single member constituency (SMC), the constituency was known as Bukit Timah Single Member Constituency.

In 1997, it was absorbed into Bukit Timah GRC along with Bukit Batok SMC, Jurong SMC, Ulu Pandan SMC and Yuhua SMC.

In 2001, the SMC was recreated as Bukit Timah GRC was broken up to form Holland–Bukit Panjang GRC, Jurong GRC and Bukit Timah SMC. In 2006, the SMC was absorbed into another GRC, Holland–Bukit Timah GRC.

Between its creation in 1951 until its redrawing in 1997, Bukit Timah was tied with Changi SMC and Tanglin SMC as the longest-surviving original constituencies in Singapore, appearing at 11 elections. As of the 2025 election, Bukit Timah remains as the only division that was still present in-name in every succeeding elections.

== Member of Parliament ==
Year	Member	Party
Formation
Legislative Council of Singapore
1951	H. J. C. Kulasingha	PP
Legislative Assembly of Singapore
1955	Lim Chin Siong	PAP
1959	Ya'acob bin Mohamed	PAP
1963	Lee Tee Tong	BS
1966	Chor Yeok Eng	PAP
Parliament of Singapore
1968	Chor Yeok Eng	PAP
1972	Chor Yeok Eng	PAP
1976	Chor Yeok Eng	PAP
1980	Chor Yeok Eng	PAP
1984	Wang Kai Yuen	PAP
1988	Wang Kai Yuen	PAP
1991	Wang Kai Yuen	PAP
Constituency abolished (1997 - 2001)
2001	Wang Kai Yuen	PAP
Constituency abolished (2006)

== Electoral results ==
Note: The Elections Department does not include rejected votes when calculating the vote shares of candidates. Hence, all candidates' vote shares will total to 100% at any given election (may not appear so in multi-way contests due to rounding).

=== Elections in 1950s ===
General Election 1951
Party	Candidate	Votes	%
PP	H. J. C. Kulasingha	1,311	57.15
Labour Party	Valiya Purayil Abdullah	983	42.85
Majority		428	14.30
Total valid votes		2,294	98.62
Rejected ballots		32	1.38
Turnout		2,326	60.42
Registered electors		3,850	
PP win (new seat)			

General Election 1955
Party	Candidate	Votes	%	±%
PAP	Lim Chin Siong	3,259	52.45	N/A
DP	Tan Wah Meng	1,308	21.05	N/A
LF	A. N. Mitra	924	14.88	N/A
PP	S. F. Ho	722	11.62	▼31.23
Majority		1,951	31.40	▲17.10
Total valid votes		6,213	99.06	▲0.44
Rejected ballots		59	0.94	▼0.44
Turnout		6,272	68.37	▲7.95
Registered electors		9,173		▲138.26
PAP gain from PP				

General Election 1959
Party	Candidate	Votes	%	±%
PAP	Ya'acob bin Mohamed	6,174	61.14	▲8.69
LSP	Pek Cheng Chuan	2,460	24.36	N/A
Independent	Lee Yew Seng	1,464	14.50	N/A
Majority		3,714	36.78	▲5.38
Total valid votes		10,098	99.10	▲0.04
Rejected ballots		92	0.90	▼0.04
Turnout		10,190	90.30	▲21.9
Registered electors		11,285		▲23.02
PAP hold		Swing	▲8.69	

=== Elections in 1960s ===
General Election 1963
Party	Candidate	Votes	%	±%
BS	Lee Tee Tong	6,173	52.39	N/A
PAP	Chor Yeok Eng	4,982	42.28	▼18.86
UPP	Ong Tiong Kuan	628	5.33	N/A
Majority		1,191	10.11	▼26.66
Total valid votes		11,783	98.73	▼0.37
Rejected ballots		152	1.27	▲0.37
Turnout		11,935	95.46	▲5.16
Registered electors		12,502		▲10.78
BS gain from PAP		Swing	N/A	

By-election 2 November 1966
Party	Candidate	Votes	%	±%
PAP	Chor Yeok Eng	Unopposed		
Registered electors		14,854		▲18.81
PAP gain from BS				

General Election 1968
Party	Candidate	Votes	%	±%
PAP	Chor Yeok Eng	Unopposed		
Registered electors		16,769		▲12.89
PAP hold				

=== Elections in 1970s ===
General Election 1972
Party	Candidate	Votes	%	±%
PAP	Chor Yeok Eng	9,475	66.78	N/A
BS	K. K. Nair	4,714	33.22	N/A
Majority		4,761	33.56	N/A
Total valid votes		14,189	97.20	N/A
Rejected ballots		409	2.80	N/A
Turnout		14,598	94.3	N/A
Registered electors		15,476		▼7.71
PAP hold				

General Election 1976
Party	Candidate	Votes	%	±%
PAP	Chor Yeok Eng	Unopposed		
Registered electors		13,132		▼15.15
PAP hold				

=== Elections in 1980s ===
General Election 1980
Party	Candidate	Votes	%	±%
PAP	Chor Yeok Eng	Unopposed		
Registered electors		15,334		▲16.77
PAP hold				

General Election 1984
Party	Candidate	Votes	%	±%
PAP	Wang Kai Yuen	Unopposed		
Registered electors		17,238		▲12.42
PAP hold				

General Election 1988
Party	Candidate	Votes	%	±%
PAP	Wang Kai Yuen	Unopposed		
Registered electors		20,222		▲17.31
PAP hold				

=== Elections in 1990s ===
General Election 1991
Party	Candidate	Votes	%	±%
PAP	Wang Kai Yuen	16,080	72.64	N/A
WP	Zeng Guo Yuan	5,683	25.68	N/A
Independent	Md Sani Jan	371	1.68	N/A
Majority		10,397	46.96	N/A
Total valid votes		22,134	97.53	N/A
Rejected ballots		561	2.47	N/A
Turnout		22,695	92.59	N/A
Registered electors		24,512		▲21.21
PAP hold				

=== Elections in 2000s ===
General Election 2001
Party	Candidate	Votes	%
PAP	Wang Kai Yuen	19,121	77.37
SDA	Tong Meng Chye	4,376	17.71
Independent	Tan Kim Chuang	1,215	4.92
Majority		14,745	59.66
Total valid votes		24,712	98.01
Rejected ballots		503	1.99
Turnout		25,215	93.56
Registered electors		26,951	
PAP win (new seat)			

== Historical maps ==
1955 General Election

== See also ==
- Bukit Timah GRC
