= 1957 Singaporean by-elections =

- 29 June 1957

2 seats to the Legislative Assembly of Singapore
- Registered: 29,563
- Turnout: 12,874 (43.55%) ▼11.16%
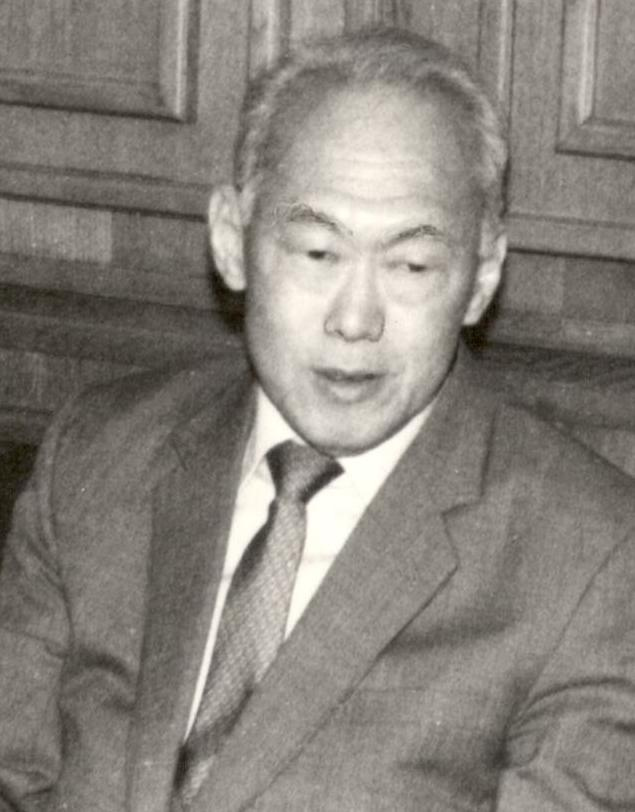

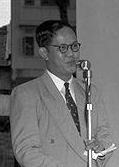

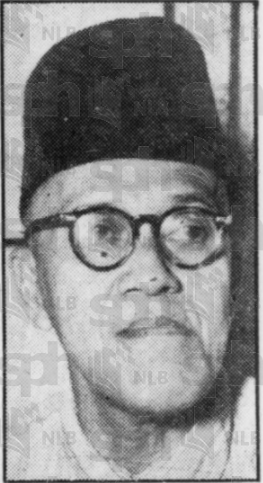
	Majority party	Minority party	Third party
Leader	Lee Kuan Yew	Tan Ek Khoo	Lim Yew Hock
Party	PAP	LSP	LF
Seats won	1	1	0
Seat change	Steady	▲1	▼1
popular vote	4,707	3,657	1,118
Percentage	36.99%	28.74%	8.79%
Swing	▼4.18%	▼7.52%	▼13.78%
	Fourth party
Leader	Inche Sidik
Party	Malay Union
Seats won	0
Seat change	Steady
popular vote	983
Percentage	7.73%
Swing	▲7.73%
Assemblymen before election
- Lee Kuan Yew
- David Marshall
- PAP
- LF
Elected Assemblymen
- Lee Kuan Yew
- Soh Ghee Soon
- PAP
- LSP

A by-election was held on 29 June 1957, with nomination day occurring on 18 May 1957 in both the constituencies of Cairnhill and Tanjong Pagar. Ultimately, Labour Front lost the Cairnhill seat to the new Liberal Socialist Party candidate Soh Ghee Soon, while Tanjong Pagar incumbent Lee Kuan Yew retained his seat.

The by-election had a voter turnout of merely 43.55%, the lowest of any elections during the period between 1948 and 1959. With the introduction of compulsory voting in 1959, the turnout of 43.55% remains the lowest for any elections in Singapore's history.

== Background ==
In 1957, David Marshall resigned from the Labour Front party and his Cairnhill seat; LF representative Keng Bang Ee was fielded as a candidate.

The seat of Tanjong Pagar was vacated when Lee Kuan Yew resigned his seat when Marshall publicly challenged Lee in a by-election, in which Lee accepted. Marshall withdrew his bid prior to nominations citing pressured by speculations of a street protest; Chong Wei Ling became the candidate in Marshall's place.

Ahead of the election, the Singapore Malay Union (SMU) was expelled by its alliance partners consisted of UMNO and MCA. Tengku Muda, a candidate for Cairnhill, was considered by the elections department of Singapore to view him as another independent candidate.

== Results ==
By-election 1957: Cairnhill
Party	Candidate	Votes	%	±%
LSP	Soh Ghee Soon	2,342	40.28	N/A
Independent	Goh Kong Beng	1,281	22.03	N/A
LF	Keng Ban Ee	1,118	19.23	▼28.35
Malay Union	Tengku Muda Muhamed bin Mahmud	983	16.90	N/A
Independent	Mirza Abdul Majid	91	1.56	N/A
Majority		1,061	18.25	▲7.09
Turnout		5,889	39.79	▼12.04
LSP gain from LF		Swing	N/A	

By-election 1957: Tanjong Pagar
Party	Candidate	Votes	%	±%
PAP	Lee Kuan Yew	4,707	68.13	▼10.20
LSP	Chong Wei Ling	1,315	19.03	N/A
Independent	Koh Choon Hong	887	12.84	N/A
Majority		3,392	49.10	▼17.43
Turnout		6,985	47.32	▼10.29
PAP hold		Swing	N/A	
