= Mohamed Eunos bin Abdullah =

Journalist and politician (b. 1876, d. 1933)

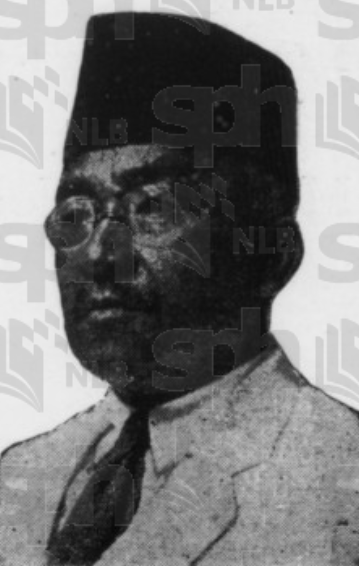
Mohamed Eunos bin Abdullah

Mohamed Eunos bin Abdullah (1876 – 12 December 1933) was a pioneer of modern Malay journalism, a politician, and a leader of the Malay community of Singapore. He was the first Malay member of the Municipal Commission of Singapore and the Legislative Council of the Straits Settlements. He was also the founder of Kesatuan Melayu, a political organisation.

== Early life and education ==
Eunos was born in either Singapore or Sumatra in 1876. His father was a Minangkabau merchant from Sumatra. After graduating from a Malay school in Kampong Glam, he attended Raffles Institution.

== Career ==
After graduating from Raffles Institution between 1893 and 1894, he was employed as a harbour master attendant in Singapore. He later became a harbour master in Muar, Johor, where he remained for five years before returning to Singapore. He became the first editor of the Utusan Melayu after receiving a job offer from newspaper proprietor Walter Makepeace in 1907. In 1914, he became the editor of the Lembaga Melayu, which was the only Malayan newspaper to be published in the Jawi script at the time. He frequently published editorials supporting Malay nationalism in both newspapers.

Eunos was made a member of the Muslim Advisory Board. In 1921, he helped found the Muslim Institute, which cared for the needs of ordinary Malay residents. In 1922, he was made a justice of the peace. He was later made a member of the Municipal Commission of Singapore, becoming the commission's first Malay member. In 1924, he was appointed a councillor in the Legislative Council of the Straits Settlements, becoming the first Malay to serve in the council.

Eunos in the 1920s condemned official government policy on how it disadvantaged Malay youths. He brought the issue to the government on raising the age limit for Malay boys studying at government English schools but was rebuffed by the Colonial Secretary. He believed Malays were left behind and not fit to secure appointments by others bred and born outside the Colony. His efforts were partially responsible for the establishment of Malay trade schools in 1929.

In 1926, Eunos helped to found the Kesatuan Melayu, the first political organisation established in British Malaya, (and the first ever Malay political organisation) to compete with the Singapore Islamic Association, which he and his fellow founders described as a "rich man's club". He also served as the organisation's first president. He later petitioned the legislative council to fund the establishment of Kampung Melayu, a settlement which would inculcate a sense of Malay nationalism. The council provided the organisation with a grant to purchase land. A 240-hectare plot of land in eastern Singapore was acquired with the grant, allowing for the establishment of the settlement, which was later renamed Kampong Eunos.

== Personal life and death ==
Eunos lived on Desker Road. He was a member of the Rotary Club of Singapore, and was the first Malay to address the club. He retired from the legislative council in early 1933, and his health began to deteriorate soon after. He died on 12 December 1933 and was buried in Bidadari Cemetery.

The roads Jalan Eunos, Eunos Avenue, Eunos Crescent, Eunos Link, Eunos Road and Eunos Terrace, as well as the Eunos MRT station, were all named after Eunos.
