= Masjid Khalid =

Mosque located in Geylang, Singapore

Masjid Khalid مسجد خالد
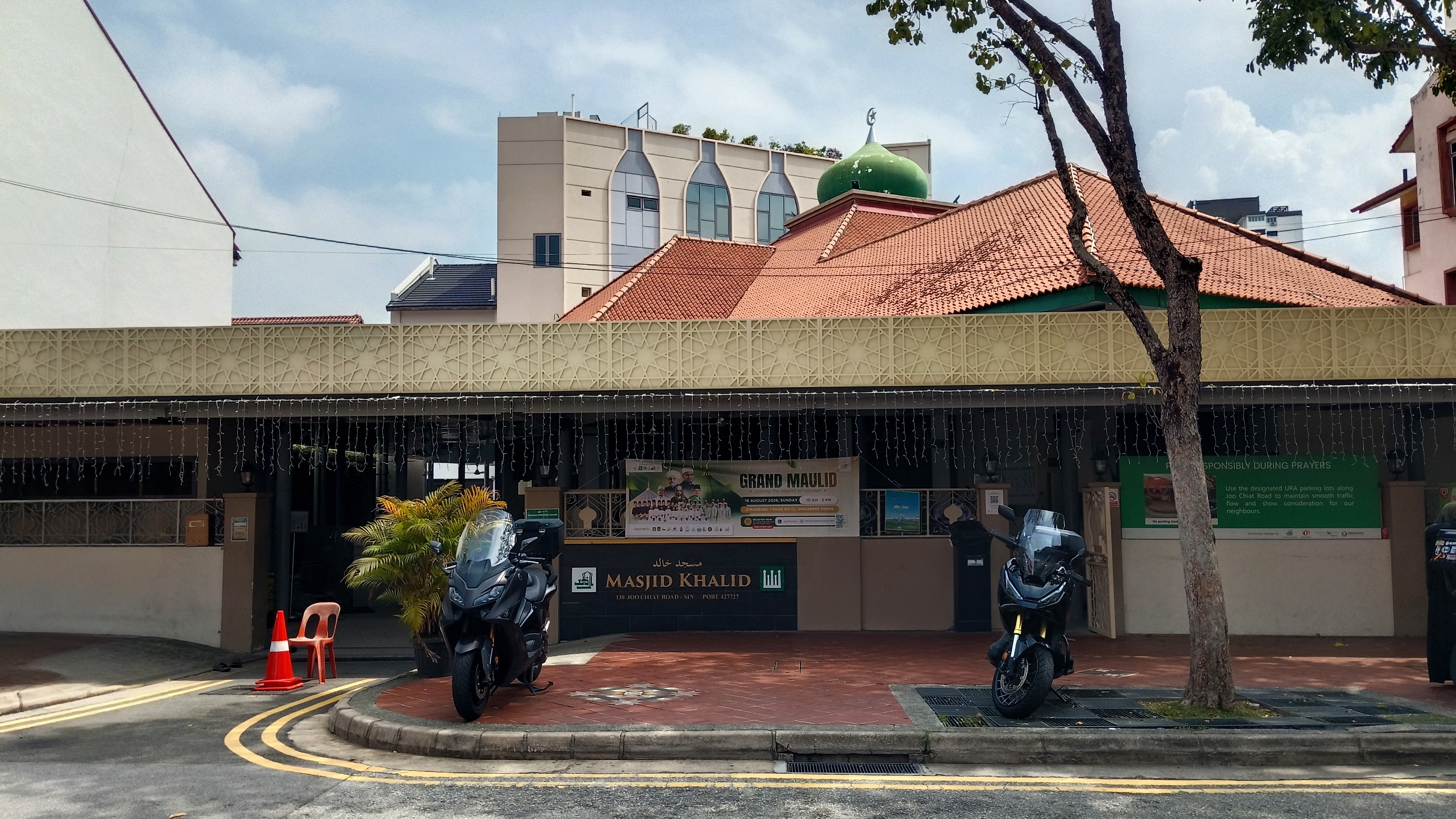

- Location in Singapore

Religion
- Affiliation: Sunni Islam

Location
- Location: 130 Joo Chiat Road, Singapore 427727
- Country: Singapore
- Interactive map of Masjid Khalid مسجد خالد
- Coordinates: 1.3134861°N 103.8991146°E

Architecture
- Type: Mosque
- Style: Islamic architecture
- Established: 1907
- Completed: 1917 (Original structure); 1999 (Reconstruction)
- Dome: 2

Masjid Khalid is a mosque located along Joo Chiat Road in the Geylang Serai district of Geylang, Singapore. Built in 1917 and rebuilt twice afterwards, it is named after its founder, Haji Abdul Khalid.

== History ==
The mosque was established in 1907 on land that was an awqaf from Haji Abdul Khalid bin Mohammed, a local Malay merchant. He had founded the mosque as a place for a group of Nasi kandar street hawkers in the Geylang area to pray during their working hours. The mosque was completed in 1917 and named Masjid Khalid after its founder. After the formation of the Majlis Ugama Islam Singapura (MUIS), they authorized the mosque as a centre for the collection of Zakat al-Fitr and registrations for the poor and needy. To accommodate the rapidly growing Muslim population in the eastern sector of Geylang, the mosque was rebuilt in 1999 as a larger structure. It became one of two congregational mosques serving the Geylang Serai district, the other being Masjid Darul Aman which was built in 1986 to replace a smaller mosque at Sims Avenue.

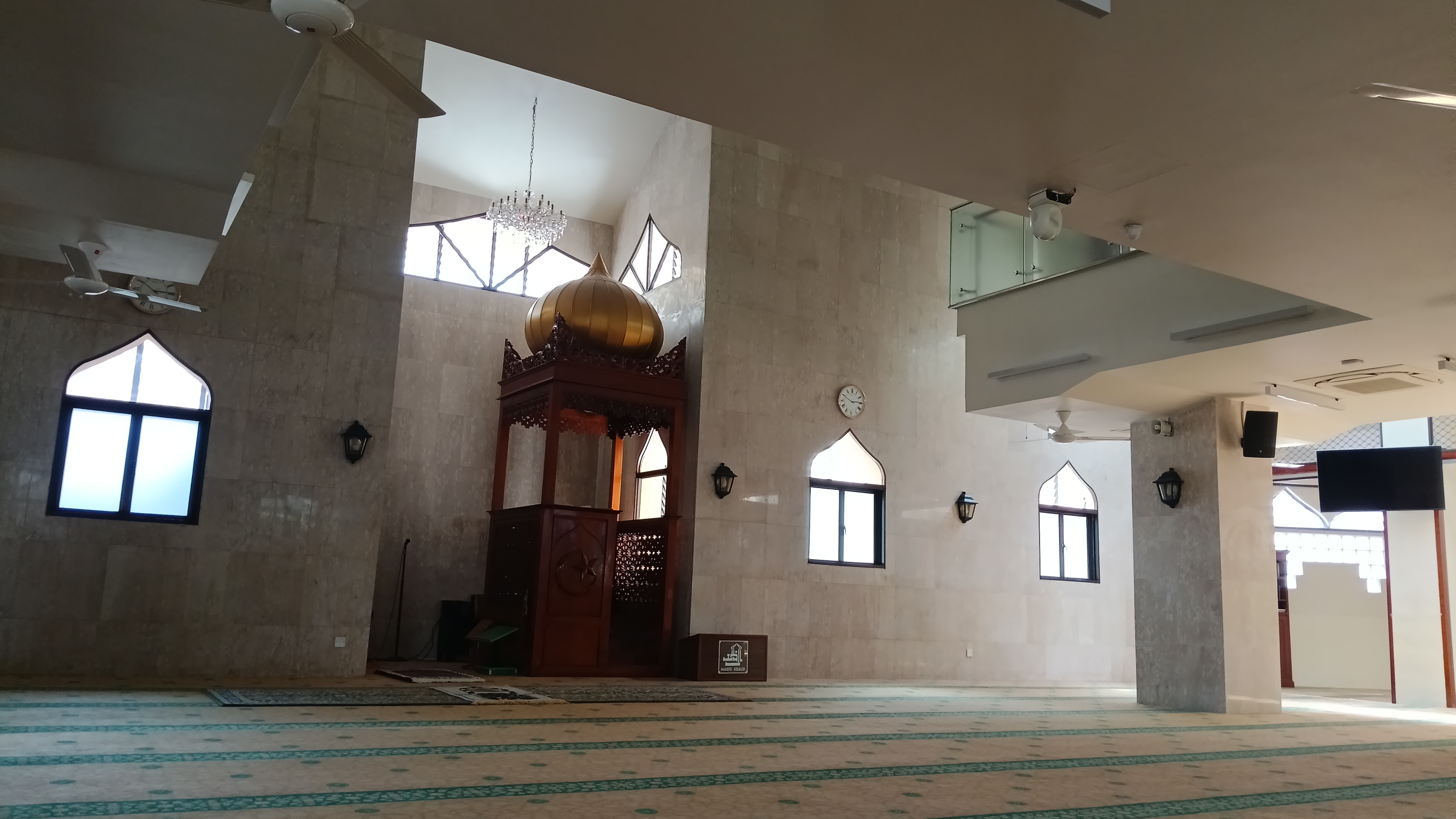
Interior of the mosque.

In 2004, the committee of Masjid Khalid bought several shophouses which surrounded the mosque, turning them into a source of income for the mosque. In May 2019, the youth section of Masjid Khalid was renovated in order to better facilitate younger congregants of the mosque. Then in August of the same year, the mosque was closed down temporarily in order for an extensive renovation project to be carried out. The mosque was ultimately completed in late 2022 and declared reopened by then President, Halimah Yacob, on 13 January 2023, with the grand reopening ceremony led by the Mufti of Singapore, Nazirudin Mohamed Nasir. A new annexe building was added to the mosque, featuring additional classrooms, offices and multi-purpose areas.

== Transportation ==
Masjid Khalid is situated between Onan Road and Joo Chiat Road, while it has entrances on either side of the building that lead from both roads. The mosque is also within walking distance from the Paya Lebar MRT station on the East–West and Circle Lines.

== See also ==
- List of mosques in Singapore
