= Ahmadiyya in Singapore =

Islamic movement

Ahmadiyya (Malay: Ahmadiyah; Tamil: அகமதியா; Chinese: 阿赫迈底亚) is an Islamic religious community in Singapore. The Community was established during the era of the Second Caliphate, shortly before the Second World War. Ghulam Hussain Ayyaz was the first missionary sent to the region, who under the direction of the caliph, arrived in 1935, in a period when the territory was part of the Straits Settlements. In the 1970s, the Community had roughly 200 followers, represented by 1-2% of the Muslim population.

== History ==
In the 1920s, a number of Ahmadi Muslim journals and books published in India were known to be widely circulated in a number of South East Asian countries, including Singapore. Ahmadiyya influences reached such heights that a protest held at the Victoria Memorial Hall attracted over two thousand people. However, the formal history of the Ahmadiyya movement in Singapore begins 1935, when the second caliph of the Community, Mirza Basheer-ud-Din Mahmood Ahmad sent Ghulam Hussain Ayyaz as a missionary to a number of British territories in the Malay Peninsula. Singapore, along with modern-day Malaysian states of Malacca and Penang, were part of the Straits Settlements, a number of British territories within the peninsula. Ayyaz was among the first batch of missionaries sent all over the world by the caliph.

According to the recorded history of the Ahmadiyya movement, the first person to become an Ahmadi Muslim was Haji Jaafar, who embraced his new faith in 1938, three years following the arrival of Ayyaz in Singapore. The first president of the movement in Singapore was Engku Ismail bin Abdul Rahman, a descendant of the Johor royal family. His successor was Hamid Salikin who took office in 1955. In 1966 Muhammad Osman Chou, an Ahmadi Muslim missionary who grew up in Anhui, China, was transferred to Singapore in April 1966. During his term, which lasted 3 years, he translated a number of Ahmadiyya books into Mandarin, including, The Philosophy of the Teachings of Islam and Ahmadiyyat, the True Islam.

The first Annual Convention in Singapore was held on 26 and 27 December 1987, after more than 50 years following the introduction of the movement in Singapore. The convention, which had 121 members in attendance, was held joint with its neighboring country of Malaysia.

The fourth caliph of the community, Mirza Tahir Ahmad paid a visit to Singapore on 8 September 1984. During his visit, which lasted a week, he laid the foundation stone for the Community's first mosque in Singapore to which he gave the name Taha Mosque.

In 2015, there were around 300 members.

== Persecution ==
On 23 June 1969, the Islamic Religious Council of Singapore issued a fatwa declaring the Ahmadiyya movement a group falling outside the fold of Islam.

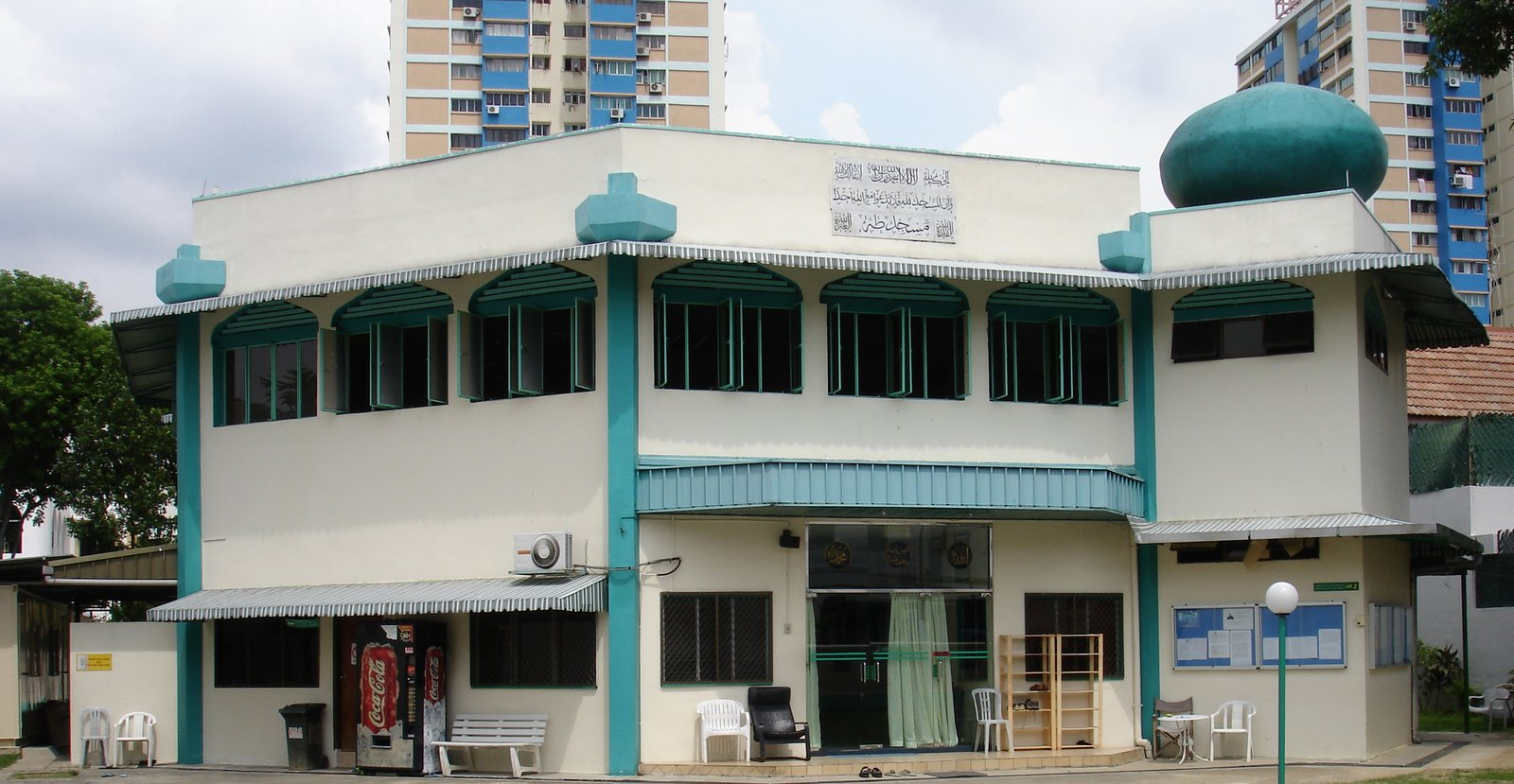
Taha Mosque, the only Ahmadiyya Muslim mosque in Singapore

During the 1980s, the Ahmadiyya Muslim Community of Singapore built their first purpose-built mosque, on Onan Road, Geylang, in central Singapore. The site previously consisted of a building, which was already used as a place of worship by Ahmadi Muslims, until a storm brought sufficient damage to the structure to demand a reconstruction. The new mosque was opened in 1985. Observing the development, a number of Muslims, showing particular concern of the building's appearance, urged the Islamic Religious Council of Singapore to take urgent action on the spread of Ahmadiyya, whose teachings they considered "un-Islamic". Othman Haron Eusofe forwarded this "concern" at the Community Development Ministry. Ahmad Mattar, the then Minister-in-charge of Muslim Affairs reinforced Eusofe's view, stating that the Ahmadi Muslims were intentionally being provocative by calling their mosque, a mosque. Throughout the year Mattar was vocal in his opposition to the Ahmadiyya Muslim Community, warning of the "dangers" posed by the Community. As a consequence, the Council attempted to produce "comprehensive" measures in an attempt to tackle the spread of the Community's teachings in Singapore. A committee with members representing 11 different Muslim Singaporean organizations was set up by the Council.

In 1989 Ahmadi Muslims posted religious pamphlets in letterboxes, including those belonging to mainstream Muslims. This provoked mainstream Muslims throughout the country, expressing concern that this would "mislead and confuse" young Muslims.

On 27 January 2008, about a dozen graves belonging to members of the Community were desecrated at the Choa Chu Kang Cemetery, on the western portion of the island. The cemetery is the largest in the country, and comprises cemeteries of various religious denominations, including about 30 graves of Ahmadi Muslims. The perpetrators remain unidentified.

== See also ==
- Islam in Singapore
