= Malay Union =

Defunct Singaporean political party

- Chinese name: 新加坡马来人联合会
- Malay name: Kesatuan Melayu Singapura
- Tamil name: மலாய் ஐக்கியம்
- President: Mohamed Eunos bin Abdullah
- Founder: Ishak bin Ahmad & Mohamed Eunos bin Abdullah
- Founded: 14 May 1926; 100 years ago
- Succeeded by: Singapore Alliance
- Ideology: Malay Nationalism
- Political position: Centre-Right
- Religion: Islam

The Malay Union (Malay: Kesatuan Melayu) (abbreviation: KMS), was a political party in Singapore from 1926 to 1960.

== History ==
KMS was established on 14 May 1926 as a religious and cultural organisation for the Malay community. KMS's leaders were for the most part, English-educated professionals, and persons of social standing in the Malay community. Ishak bin Ahmad was one of its founding members. KMS wanted to promote the rights and interests of the Malays, and was known for establishing the Jalan Eunos Malay Settlement or Kampong Melayu in 1929.

In 1954, KMS, together with Singapore Labour Party and Singapore Socialist Party allied and formed the Labour Front (LF). When a decision was made to merge into a single party, KMS withdrew, and joined another alliance with two Malayan political parties, United Malays National Organisation (UMNO) (whose Singaporean branch had been founded by the leaders of the KMS) and the Malayan Chinese Association (MCA).

In the 1955 general election, KMS nominated a single candidate, Inche Sidik, to contest the Southern Islands constituency. He was elected with 50.6% of the votes. KMS also fielded a candidate in the 1957 by-election for Cairnhill, receiving 17% of the vote. However, KMS had previously agreed with the other alliance members not to field a candidate, and was subsequently expelled from the alliance for doing so.

After trying but failing to form an alliance with Pan-Malayan Islamic Party and Parti Rakyat, KMS contested the 1959 general elections alone. By this time the party was led by Muda Muhamed Mahmud, as Sidik had left to join UMNO. It nominated three candidates, but received only 0.5% vote share, failing to win a seat.

After the Societies Ordinance came into force in 1960, KMS failed to re-register.

== Election results ==
=== Legislative Assembly ===
Election	Leader	Votes	%	Seats					Position	Result
Election	Leader	Votes	%	Contested			Total	+/–	Position	Result
Election	Leader	Votes	%	Seats	Won	Lost	Total	+/–	Position	Result
1955	Inche Sidik	1,233	0.79%	1	1	0	1 / 25	▲2	8th	Opposition
1959	Muda Muhamed Mahmud	2,819	0.54%	3	0	3	0 / 51	▼2	9th	No seats

=== Legislative Assembly by-election ===
Election	Leader	Constituency contested	Votes	%	Seats				Result
Election	Leader	Constituency contested	Votes	%	Contested		Total	+/–	Result
Election	Leader	Constituency contested	Votes	%	Won	Lost	Total	+/–	Result
1957	Inche Sidik	Cairnhill	983	16.9%	0	1	0 / 1	Steady	Lost
