= Eunos Bus Interchange =

Bus interchange in Geylang East, Singapore

Eunos Bus Interchange 友诺士巴士转换站 Pusat Pertukaran Bas Eunos
- Interior of Eunos Bus Interchange.

General information
- Location: 409 Eunos Road 2, Singapore 409388
- System: Public Bus Interchange
- Owner: Land Transport Authority
- Operator: SBS Transit
- Bus routes: 8 (SBS Transit); 1 (SMRT Buses)
- Bus stands: 4 Boarding Berths; 2 Alighting Berths
- Bus operators: SBS Transit; SMRT Buses
- Connections: EW7 Eunos

Construction
- Structure type: At-grade
- Accessible: Accessible alighting/boarding points Accessible public toilets Graduated kerb edges Tactile guidance system

History
- Opened: 10 December 1989; 36 years ago

Key dates
- 10 December 1989: Commenced operations

Eunos Bus Interchange is a bus interchange located in Geylang East, Singapore. It is located and built beside Eunos MRT station and is surrounded by Eunos Road 2, Eunos Crescent and Sims Avenue.

The interchange is designed with traditional Malay roof structure and shape, but using modern materials such as steel beams, similar to that of the Eunos MRT station. It gives a sense of identity to the area as the bus interchange lies close to Geylang and also to honour Eunos Abdullah who secured 700-hectares of land for the Malay settlements in the early 1900s.

== History ==
The interchange was first announced in October 1984 as one of eight planned bus interchanges that would be connected to the Mass Rapid Transit (MRT) network as part of the "MRT-Bus Integration Scheme". The interchange opened on 10 December 1989, along with Pasir Ris Bus Interchange. Sporting a Minangkabau-style roof, the interchange had 30 parking bays, and six berths.

== Bus contracting model ==
Under the bus contracting model, all bus services operating from Eunos Bus Interchange were divided into four bus packages, operated by two bus operators.

=== List of bus services ===
Operator	Package	Routes
SBS Transit	Bukit Merah	93
SBS Transit	Seletar	76
SBS Transit	Serangoon-Eunos	22, 60, 60A, 63, 63M, 94, 94A, 150, 154 (until June 2027)
SMRT Buses	Choa Chu Kang-Bukit Panjang	61
SMRT Buses	Serangoon-Eunos	22, 60, 60A, 63, 63M, 94, 94A, 150, 154 (from June 2027)
