= Onan Road =

Road in Singapore

Onan Road is the name of a road in Singapore that connects Changi Road to East Coast Road. Both Onan Road and the street it runs parallel to, Joo Chiat Road, were established by Chinese merchant Chew Joo Chiat in 1910 and given to the British government. However, unlike the latter, Onan Road has not been designated as a heritage site, even though it is well known amongst locals for its cultural background and predominately Malay heritage.

Shophouses along Onan Road have also been given conservation status by the Urban Redevelopment Authority (URA). The road was also formerly a red-light district, until prostitution and unlicensed massage parlours along Onan Road were ultimately outlawed in 2005.

== Religious centres ==
The headquarters of the Muslim Converts Association of Singapore (MCAS), a local society for the support of new Muslim converts, is situated along Onan Road. This building features a musalla, library, classrooms for Islamic studies, as well as shops for the purchase of Islamic related products. Formerly, the building was a derelict shopping mall named The Galaxy, which was purchased by the MCAS and reopened under the name Darul Arqam Singapore on 2 June 1997. Named after the prominent Sahabi and early Muslim convert, Al-Arqam ibn Abi al-Arqam, the name "Darul Arqam" had caused some controversy due to a similar name being used for the Malaysian Al-Arqam extremist group, which resulted in the MCAS making a statement in 1994 and later in 2024 that they were not affiliated with any foreign groups.

Onan Road is also home to the Masjid Taha, a community centre for the Singaporean branch of the Ahmadiyya religious group. Despite its name, Masjid Taha is not a mosque, but was designed as a community centre and activity hall (similar to how the Abou Ben Adhem Mosque in Springfield is not a mosque, but a Shriners auditorium and masonic lodge). It features a green dome on a square base, with the building being predominately white in colour and built in a contemporary architectural style. Masjid Taha is also situated opposite Masjid Khalid, a mainstream Sunni mosque.

== Places of worship ==
=== Masjid Khalid ===
Masjid Khalid is a mosque located along Onan Road, established in 1907 and rebuilt in 1999. The mosque holds interfaith meetings, as well as preparation and distribution of biryani rice meals during festive occasions and charity events. The mosque was extensively renovated in 2023, adding an annex building to the main structure of the mosque.

=== Bethany Emmanuel Church ===
Founded in 1961, it is situated at the junction of Onan Road and Marshall Lane. Surrounding the church are terrace houses and landed properties.

=== Toong Chai Presbyterian Church ===
Officially constituted on 8 September 1983, the Toong Chai Presbyterian Church is the first of two churches located along Onan Road. It is situated at the junction of Fowlie Road and Onan Road, with the main facade of the building facing the former.

== Other amenities ==
The Joo Chiat Neighborhood Police Post is situated along Onan Road. It was built in 1987 on the site of a former playground. The police post is a small building in a square layout, with rooms for reception, interviews and storage, as well a multi-purpose room.

== See also ==
- Joo Chiat Road
- Katong
- Sims Avenue
- Geylang Road
