= Masjid Taha =

Religious and cultural centre in Geylang, Singapore

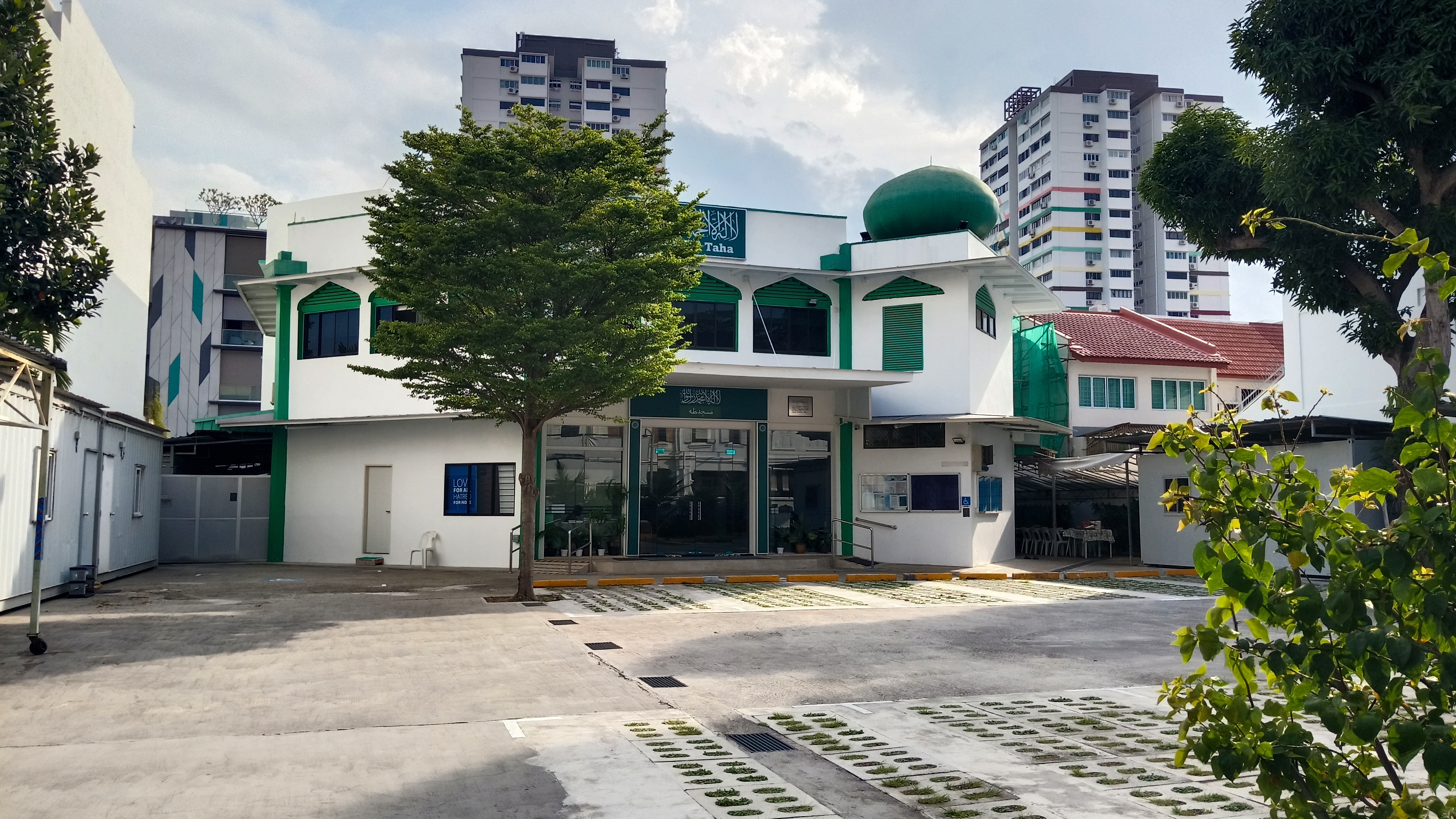
- Interactive map of Masjid Taha
- Singapore 1°19′10″N 103°56′32″E
- Type: Cultural centre
- Location: Onan Road, Geylang, Singapore

History
- Built: 1984

Site notes
- Architectural style: Modern architecture
- Governing body: Housing and Development Board

Masjid Taha (Jawi: مسجد طه) is an Ahmadi religious centre located along Onan Road in Geylang, Singapore. Built in 1985, it is the only place of worship for the Ahmadiyya Jama'at in the country. It features a musalla, library, multi-purpose halls and an Ahmadi heritage hub.

== History ==
Masjid Taha was built in 1984 along Onan Road as a religious centre for the Ahmadiyya Jama'at, a religious minority in Singapore. It was situated on the site of an earlier surau that has been built in the 1930s and thrived under Japanese patronage during World War II. The usage of the word "Masjid" in the name of the building gained controversy and negative feedback from Islamic scholars in the country, especially Syed Isa Semait, who was then serving as the country's sole mufti. Despite pressure from the Majlis Ugama Islam Singapura (MUIS) to change the name of the building, the management of Masjid Taha refused and did not comply with the multiple threats against them. Islamic educational groups, such as Perdaus, distributed brochures and delivered lessons and sermons forbidding Muslims from going to Masjid Taha in 1986, claiming that the Ahmadiyya were a "deviant" sect. Despite opposition from both the Islamic council and local agencies, it remained a popular centre amongst members of the Ahmadiyya, hosting open house events for members of the public to learn more about the Ahmadiyya Jama'at and their founder, Mirza Ghulam Ahmad.

In 2015, an exhibition of different translations and mushaf of the Qur'an was held at the Ahmadi heritage hub of Masjid Taha.

== Architecture ==
Masjid Taha is a rectangular building, with a predominately white colour scheme and a green dome, all built in a contemporary architectural style. It has two stories and contains a musalla for prayer, a library with Islamic books, a multi-purpose hall, as well as an Ahmadi heritage hub with exhibits of the history of the Ahmadiyya Jama'at. Although it resembles a mosque, it is not intended to be a mosque, but rather, an Ahmadi religious centre, similar to how the Abou Ben Adhem Shrine Mosque in Missouri is not a mosque but an auditorium hall for the Shriners fraternity.

== See also ==
- Ahmadiyya in Singapore
- List of Ahmadiyya Mosques in Singapore
