= Lim Chin Siong =

Singaporean politician (1933–1996)

- 林清祥
- Lim in the 1950s

Secretary-General of Barisan Sosialis
- In office 17 September 1961 – 21 July 1969
- Chairman: Lee Siew Choh
- Preceded by: Position established
- Succeeded by: Position abolished

Member of the Legislative Assembly for Bukit Timah Constituency
- In office 2 April 1955 – 31 March 1959
- Preceded by: Hollupatherage James Caldera Kulasingha (PP)
- Succeeded by: Ya'acob Mohamed
- Majority: 1955: 3,259 (52.45%)

Personal details
- Born: 28 February 1933 Singapore, Straits Settlements
- Died: 5 February 1996 (aged 62) Singapore
- Resting place: Mandai Crematorium and Columbarium
- Party: Barisan Sosialis (1961–1969)
- Other political affiliations: People's Action Party (1954–1961)
- Spouse: Wong Chui Wan (m. 1970)
- Children: 2
- Parents: Lim Teng Geok (father); Ang Kee Neo (mother)
- Occupation: Politician; Trade Unionist

Lim Chin Siong

Chinese name
- Traditional Chinese: 林清祥
- Simplified Chinese: 林清祥
- Hanyu Pinyin: Lín Qīngxiáng
- Jyutping: Lam4 Cing1 Coeng4
- Hokkien POJ: Lîm Chheng-siông

Lim Chin Siong (Note: Chinese: 林清祥; pinyin: Lín Qīngxiáng; Jyutping: Lam4 Cing1 Coeng4; Pe̍h-ōe-jī: Lîm Chheng-siông) (28 February 1933 – 5 February 1996) was a Singaporean politician and union leader that was prominent during the 1950s and 1960s. He was one of the co-founders of the governing People's Action Party (PAP), which has ruled the country continuously since independence. Lim also leveraged his popularity to galvanise numerous trade unions in support of the PAP during its formative years.

At 22, Lim was the youngest Legislative Assemblyman to be elected during the 1955 general election. However, against the backdrop of the Cold War, his political career was cut short by two detentions without trial after he was accused of being a communist. His first detention occurred between 1956 and 1959 under the Labour Front government. The second occurred between 1963 and 1969 when he was arrested during Operation Coldstore and detained by the PAP government, a party he had formerly co-founded. Following a suicide attempt in prison, he was released in 1969 on the condition that he permanently renounce politics.

== Early life ==
Lim was born in 1933 to Lim Teng Geok (Chinese: 林廷玉; pinyin: Lín Tíngyù; Jyutping: Lam4 Ting4 Juk6; Pe̍h-ōe-jī: Lîm Têng-gio̍k) and Ang Kee Neo (洪柿娘; Hóng Shìniang; Hung4 Ci5 Noeng4; Âng Khī-liông) in Singapore, along Telok Ayer Street, and was the second child in a family that would eventually have 13 children, although one child did not survive the Japanese occupation of Singapore. The Great Depression had a profound impact on the global economy, even in Singapore. The Lims were forced to move to peninsular Malaya in search of a better life when Lim was three years old. Lim and his family eventually settled in Pontian Kechil, Johor, where Lim would spend his childhood.

Lim enrolled in Pei Chun Primary School in Pontian in 1939. It was a time when numerous events leading up to World War II were happening both at home and globally. The Marco Polo Bridge incident had only happened two years ago in 1937, while Lim also recalled in a manuscript that was published posthumously that his father's only brother, heeding the philanthropist Tan Kah Kee's call to arms, had volunteered to fight against the Japanese in China:

"I was only five or six years old then. My uncle always held me and sang anti-Japanese and patriotic songs, like "China will not perish" (中国不会亡) and "Oh, the beautiful Chinese nation" (美哉，美哉中华民族)."

In 1942, when Lim was just nine years old and in Standard III, schools were forced to close because of the Japanese invasion of Malaya. His family, which used to run a provision shop, were forced to flee to the jungle with their town folks. His family, however, was resourceful. They cleared a piece of land to plant rice and build a wooden pondok (hut), and also raised pigs and chickens.

== Post-war years ==
After the war in 1945, Lim and his family returned to their house only to realise that it had been razed to the ground. Lim's father leased a new plot of land in Kampong Rambah, where he built a new house and restarted his provision shop business. Lim then returned to Pei Chun to complete his primary school education. As with most of his cohort who had to stop school because of the war, he graduated only at the age of 15. As there were no secondary schools in Pontian at the time, Lim's parents had to first get Lim to work temporarily as a shop assistant, and also to get Lim's brother, Lim Chin Kiat, to stop his schooling. He was then able to afford to continue his studies in Singapore at Catholic High School in 1949.

=== Chinese High School and expulsion ===
Lim did well enough in his first semester at Catholic High School that, together with an appeal from his father, he was able in 1950 to transfer to The Chinese High School, then the premier Chinese medium school in Singapore. Lim was by then 17 years old, and distracted in his studies by numerous events: the victory of the Communists and the proclamation of the People's Republic of China; the African anti-colonial movement; and the ill treatment of students, particularly of Chinese descent, in Singapore. These were factors which influenced Lim to join the Anti-British League (ABL), an anti-colonial organisation that received instructions from the Malayan Communist Party.

With the support of the ABL, and with his classmate and later political partner, Fong Swee Suan (1931–2017; 方水双; Fāng Shuǐshuāng), Lim organised a successful boycott of the Chinese junior middle school examinations in 1951. The examinations were deemed pointless as it was primarily meant for students who wanted to further their studies in China, even though all universities were closed to Malayans since the People's Republic of China was established. This attracted the attention of the Special Branch, who held him in custody for a week. When he was released, he was expelled by The Chinese High School.

=== Involvement with trade unions ===
The Special Branch would keep Lim under close watch even after his release and expulsion from school. He tried to learn some English at the Eastaff English School, and then worked as a part-time teacher, but under the name of "Mr Yu". Between 1953 and 1954, Lim then became more involved in the unions: he worked as a paid secretary for the Changi branch of the Singapore Bus Workers' Union, then its Paya Lebar branch, and also became secretary in the Malaya Spinning Workers' Union. In 1954, leaders of the newly formed union, the Singapore Factory and Shop Workers' Union (SFSWU), were impressed by his abilities and invited him to the post of secretary-general. Within a year, the membership of the SFSWU grew from a few thousand to about 30,000 members.

== People's Action Party (1954–1961) ==
=== Founding of the PAP and 1955 elections ===
Lim's work in the unions caught the eye of Lee Kuan Yew, who had returned to Singapore from Britain and organised regular secret meetings in the basement of his Oxley Road house which were attended by Toh Chin Chye, S. Rajaratnam and Devan Nair, among others. During those meetings, they drew up a plan to set up the People's Action Party (PAP). Even though Lim was a co-founder of the party, he declined to be on stage during the inauguration of the PAP in November 1954 as he felt his previous police record might be exploited by their rivals and jeopardise the party.

The historic Rendel Constitution by the British was launched in 1954, and allowed up to 25 members to be elected to the Legislative Assembly. Lim was one of four PAP candidates selected to contest in the 1955 election. James Puthucheary, in charge of the publicity for the PAP during the elections, remarked that Lim "was brilliant, and the crowd was spellbound". An attendee at one of the rallies recounted:

"There were 40,000 people, each mesmerised by Lim Chin Siong's oratory. 'The British say you cannot stand on your own two feet,' he jeered. 'Show them how you can stand!' And 40,000 people leapt up—shining with sweat, fists in the air—shouting, Merdeka."

Lim was elected into the Legislative Assembly as the Assembly Member for Bukit Timah in 1955. Lim was the youngest Assemblyman ever to be elected in Singapore's history, at the age of 22. Lim seemed to be an extremely promising politician, even in the eyes of Lee Kuan Yew. Chief Minister David Marshall recalled that Lee had introduced Lim to him, and said that Lim would be the "future Prime Minister of Singapore".

=== Hock Lee bus riots ===
The first of many controversies in which Lim was implicated was the Hock Lee Bus Company riots, which started in April 1955 and ended on 12 May 1955 with four dead, including Chong Lon Chong, a 16-year-old student who was paraded by the rioters for three hours on a stretcher after getting shot.

Hock Lee workers were on strike on 27 April 1955 when the police used force on them, injuring 15 people. In response, Fong Swee Suan, Lim's former classmate at The Chinese High School, and now the leader of the Bus Workers' Union and a PAP member, was quoted in the Chinese newspapers that "there was bound to be bloodshed in a revolution". Students from the Chinese-medium schools also joined the strikes in droves to provide moral support.

Chief Secretary William Goode had suggested that the demand for bloodshed by the PAP was the cause of the violence. Chief Minister David Marshall demanded in the Legislative Assembly that the PAP "purge themselves of the communists", whom he placed at fault for the riots. Lim refrained from commenting at length during the debate, except to state that he would not support the view that was put forth by the British. Lee Kuan Yew also did not state outright that Lim was not culpable, and in a long speech during the debate said that the riots could only have been incited because of the way the workers were treated, and that it was not possible to fight both the colonial masters and communists at the same time. Ultimately, the Legislative Assembly voted overwhelmingly for the temporary closure of two Chinese-medium schools, The Chinese High School and Chung Cheng High School, in the aftermath of the riots.

To safeguard the PAP's reputation, Lee Kuan Yew requested that all members of the PAP central executive committee who were branded "militant and pro-communist" not to contest the next committee election. Lim, Fong, Devan Nair, and Chan Chiaw Thor (those who had the closest links to trade unions) were hence forced to step down.

=== 1956 constitutional talks in London ===
Although Lim was forced to step down from the PAP central executive committee, he was still part of the PAP delegation in the all-party constitutional conference in London in April 1956. In his manuscripts that were published only posthumously, Lim remembered that the all-party delegation was not aligned in its objective to seek full self-government, and that it was "like a circus". Knowing that Marshall had made an enormous gamble by placing his job on the line in the case the talks failed, his political rivals - particularly from the PAP and the Labour Party - seemed to have given up on helping Marshall achieve his objective.

Marshall's key desire was for the British to hand over the control of internal security to the Singapore government. Lim supported this proposal and made his stand clear during the talks, but the British were concerned that Marshall was too soft and emotional to control the "communist" influence as could be seen from the riots of the last year, and rejected it. Knowing Marshall's gambit, the British had already begun to look to other leaders in the delegation, particularly Lim Yew Hock and Lee Kuan Yew, whom they thought they could work with better. After three weeks, the talks failed and Marshall resigned, handing over the office of Chief Minister to Lim Yew Hock.

=== 1956 Chinese middle school riots ===
Unlike Marshall, who was very reluctant with the use of force, Lim Yew Hock (Note: To distinguish between Lim Chin Siong and Lim Yew Hock who share the same surname, in this section they are referred to by their full names.) was ruthless and was keen to show the British that he could control any disruptive influences in Singapore. On 18 September 1956, Lim Yew Hock used the Preservation of Public Security Ordinance (PPSO), which allowed him extraordinary police powers, to dissolve seven organisations and detain seven people, mainly from Chinese middle schools. As public anger became so strong over the arrests, Lim Chin Siong and others launched a Civil Rights Convention, which was Singapore's first civil rights movement. This alarmed the British and Lim Yew Hock, as the Convention was supported by locals of all backgrounds and ideologies at the time and was on the verge of becoming a real force.

On 25 October 1956, Lim Chin Siong gave a speech at Beauty World in Hokkien to an angry audience, urging them to calm down and that their enemy was not the police, but Lim Yew Hock and the colonial masters. Among those who attended the rally were Lee Kuan Yew, Toh Chin Chye and Devan Nair.

Later that night, a riot began after police and protesters clashed outside The Chinese High School, and escalated into an island-wide riot, with 13 deaths. After the riots, Lim Chin Siong and close to 300 others were arrested, apparently because Lim Chin Siong had incited the audience in his speech to "pah mata" ("beat the police" in Hokkien).

At the Legislative Assembly, Education Minister Chew Swee Kee said, "It is significant to note that the Member for Bukit Timah (Lim Chin Siong) at that meeting said that instead of shouting "Merdeka" the people should now shout, "pah mata", which means "beat the police". Is there any doubt whatsoever as to who sparked off the riots?"

Lee, who was present at Lim Chin Siong's speech, did not refute this.

A transcript of the speech by the Special Branch, recently declassified, revealed that Lim Chin Siong had said, "A lot of people don't want to shout "Merdeka"! They want to shout "pah mata". This is wrong. We want to ask them to cooperate with us because they are also wage-earners and so that in the time of crisis they will take their guns and run away."

There are contrasting views to what Lim Chin Siong was trying to achieve during that speech. The view was that Lim Chin Siong was a brilliant orator trying to create a "psychological climate" in which the audience would "go out and take action of their own volition". Another perspective was that Lim Chin Siong was framed, and that Lim Yew Hock and the British had found a golden opportunity to arrest him.

=== First detention (1956–1959) ===
Lim Chin Siong was placed under solitary confinement for close to a year, away from his other PAP colleagues, as they were placed in the Medium Security Prison instead. The number of PAP members imprisoned rose in August 1957, when PAP members from the trade unions (viewed as "communist or pro-communist") won half the seats in the PAP's central executive committee (CEC). The "moderate" CEC members, including Lee Kuan Yew, Toh Chin Chye and others, refused to take their appointments in the CEC. Lim Yew Hock's government again made a sweeping round of arrests, imprisoning all the "communist" members, before the "moderates" re-assumed their office.

In early 1958, Lim Chin Siong was transferred to the Medium Security Prison as well. It was in the prison where Lim Chin Siong was asked to endorse a document called "The Ends and Means of Malayan Socialism", which indicated that the detainees were committed to a "free, democratic, socialist and non-communist Malaya". Reflecting on the document in his manuscript, Lim Chin Siong said that although he agreed with the contents in the statement, he felt he signed the document "under duress", and that it set a precedent whereby all political prisoners had to sign written statements prior to their release.

With most of the PAP members labelled "communist" in prison, the British assessed that the concerns of internal security had been successfully allayed. Furthermore, the subsequent all-party delegations (in 1957 and 1958) accepted most of the conditions that David Marshall had earlier rejected, which had led to the failure of the talks in 1956. A fresh round of elections would be held in May 1959, this time for full internal self-government.

The PAP won convincingly, with 43 out of the 51 seats at the polls. With this victory, Lim Chin Siong and his fellow PAP colleagues who were imprisoned were released on 4 June 1959, just a few days after a hastily held CEC elections.

=== Internal party strife ===
After Lim Chin Siong's release, he was appointed political secretary to Finance Minister Goh Keng Swee. The PAP central executive committee rules had by then been changed such that only "cadre" members appointed by the party executive could participate in committee elections, ensuring that there would not be a takeover similar to the one in 1957.

==== 1961 Hong Lim by-election ====
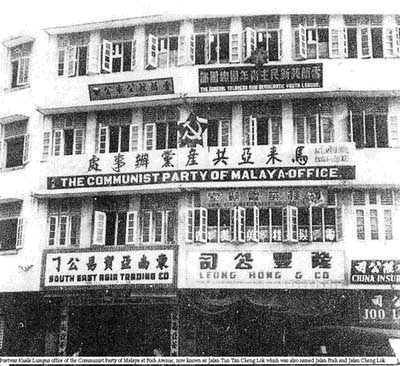
Lee Kuan Yew had made a secret alliance with the Communist Party of Malaya (CPM), yet the CPM could not secure the voter base needed to win in the 1961 Hong Lim by-election.

Although the "communist" faction had been frozen out of ever taking over the PAP, other problems had begun to arise internally. Ong Eng Guan, the former Mayor of the City Council, presented a set of "16 Resolutions" to revisit some issues previously explored by Lim Chin Siong's faction of the PAP: abolishing the PPSO, revising the Constitution, and changing the method of selecting cadre members.

Although Ong's 16 Resolutions originated from the left-wing faction led by Lim Chin Siong, that faction had only reluctantly asked the PAP leadership to clarify its position on them, as they still thought that the party with Lee Kuan Yew at the helm was a better alternative than Ong. However, Lee took the stance taken by the left-wing PAP members as a lack of confidence in his leadership. This issue caused a rift between the "moderate" PAP members (led by Lee) and the "left-wing" faction (led by Lim).

Ong was then expelled, and he resigned his Legislative Assembly seat to challenge the government to a by-election in Hong Lim in April 1961, where he won 73.3% of the vote.

==== Merger issue ====
The British had earlier tabled a proposition to merge the Malaya, Singapore, and North Borneo territories into a single sovereign country, calling it "the Grand Design". However, Tunku Abdul Rahman, the Malayan premier, had never been very keen on the proposal, as he was concerned that Singapore's majority Chinese population would outnumber the number of Malays and would hence dominate the political scene. Hence, many PAP members and the public were shocked that the Tunku had announced that he was favourable to merger in May 1961, and that Lee and Goh had secretly been in discussions with him since April. The public seemed to view the Tunku's agreement to merger with suspicion: on the surface, it appeared that the circumstances had not changed, yet the Tunku had changed his mind. The Anson by-election became a test of public sentiment towards the PAP - and they failed it, losing the seat to David Marshall in July.

==== Eden Hall Tea Party and vote of no-confidence ====
Lim was concerned that, despite the tide increasingly swinging towards him in the political battle, the British might not be keen on a "radical" wing of the PAP taking over the government. To settle this issue, Lim and his colleagues met with the British High Commissioner for Southeast Asia, Lord Selkirk, to understand if the British would continue to work with the government, even if it was not the PAP. The meeting was held at Selkirk's residence, Eden Hall; this became known as the "Eden Hall Tea Party". Selkirk had given a non-committal response that they would abide by the constitution.

Lee interpreted the meeting as one between "British lions and Communist bears", and also as an act of party disobedience. He dramatically tabled a motion of confidence in the government. 13 PAP assembly members abstained from the vote, and were expelled. Around two thirds of the party membership - including Lim Chin Siong - left with them.

== Barisan Sosialis (1961–1969) ==
=== The Battle for Merger ===
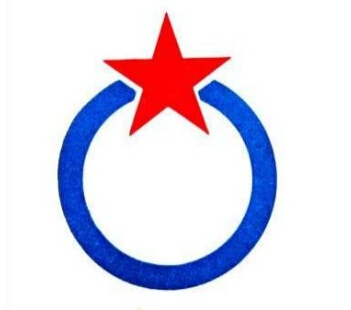
The Barisan Sosialis was founded by Lim Chin Siong and he became its secretary-general in Aug 1961.

In August 1961, Lim and his fellow PAP members who were expelled formed a new party, called the Barisan Sosialis (English: Socialist Front), with Lim as secretary-general and Lee Siew Choh as chairman. Meanwhile, details on the terms of merger with Malaya had been planned out by the PAP without any other party or public input.

Lim and the Barisan were horrified: under the terms, Singapore residents would effectively become second-class citizens in Malaysia. For the price of having autonomy in labour and education matters, Singapore would:

- Be under-represented in the Federal Parliament for its population, with just 25 seats;
- Singapore citizens would not be able to move freely in the other states, unlike other citizens; and
- The federal government would control internal security matters, even though Singapore had given up the rights above.

An example of the referendum ballot paper used during the election. All three choices for the referendum were for merger, but in different forms. The Barisan's option was distorted and called Option B.

Lim and the Barisan stated that such a merger proposal was giving away the rights of Singaporeans to the Federation, instead of trying to preserve them. They were not against merger, but wanted Singapore to enter the federation as equals to other states, such as Penang.

The Barisan demanded that general elections be held for a clear mandate on merger. Instead of general elections, however, the PAP committed themselves to a national referendum for merger. However, rather than a simple yes-no referendum, the PAP developed a referendum with all three choices agreeing to merger but in different forms (see the referendum ballot slip below).

The PAP endorsed Option A in the referendum, and announced that the Barisan's option was B. However, Option B was deliberately misrepresented: in a radio forum, Goh Keng Swee announced that the Barisan proposal would make "nearly half of the present citizens" lose their voting rights. The PAP also ruled the radio airwaves - Lee Kuan Yew gave 12 talks on radio on "the battle for merger", putting his case across and attacking the Barisan for being "communists". However, when Lim demanded for the Barisan to be given equal airtime, they were denied.

Frustrated at how the Barisan's proposal had been misrepresented, Lim called for his supporters to cast blank or spoilt votes during the referendum. However, the PAP was quick in amending the referendum rules at the last minute: it ensured that blank votes would be treated as 'undecided' and the ultimate decision for where they would count would be made by the Legislative Assembly, which they controlled.

On Referendum Day, 1 September 1962, 71.1% of voters chose Option A, while 25.6% cast blank votes. Lim and the Barisan had lost the battle for merger.

=== Operation Coldstore and second detention (1963–1969) ===
For months before the referendum, the British, Tunku Abdul Rahman and Lee Kuan Yew had sought a justifiable reason to make a mass round of arrests, including Lim and many of his Barisan Sosialis members and supporters. However, key British figures felt there was none, and believed that the left was behaving constitutionally, and commanded wide popular legitimacy. Yet, the Tunku viewed the Barisan as a communist problem that had to be solved before merger, and Lee was keen on ensuring his political survival through the arrests.

Lim's meeting with A. M. Azahari on 6 December 1962 would change the British's minds. Azahari was a leading Bruneian leftist who led a rebellion in Brunei two days later. After that meeting, the British approved the swoop, and within a day the Internal Security Council approved a round of arrests. The operation was given the codename "Coldstore". However, the operation was delayed by almost two months as Lee and the Tunku negotiated over the list of people to be arrested. A list of 169 people was eventually finalised, with Lim's name at the top of the list.

In the early hours of 2 February 1963, Operation Coldstore was carried out. In the end, 113 detainees were arrested, with the rest managing to escape. Lee offered Lim permission to leave Singapore if he wanted to, but he chose to stay to face another incarceration without trial.

Lim never personally recounted in detail his detention experience. The detention lasted six years, even longer than his previous term when he was arrested under Lim Yew Hock's government. It was clear, however, that this detention broke him mentally:

"You are detained for years, until such a time that you are willing to humiliate your own integrity. Until you are humiliated publicly. So much so, when you come out, you cannot put your head up, you cannot see your friends. Alright, then they may release you. It is a very cruel torture."

The detainees were treated badly. Initially, men were kept in solitary confinement, had no access to the toilet, and were forced to stay in a barren cell except for a small lightbulb on the ceiling and a chamber pot. Detainees were only allowed access to a lawyer more than a month after they were arrested. David Marshall, who conducted an investigation into the conditions of the detention, said that conditions were "radically worse than conditions imposed in the past" by the British colonial government or any previous Singaporean government".

Under such conditions, Lim's health deteriorated. He suffered from depression and high blood pressure. The doctor prescribed medication to keep his blood pressure under control, but it seemed to make him more depressed. Eventually, he had to be moved to the Singapore General Hospital, where he attempted suicide.

Eventually, Lim gave up the struggle in prison and requested to be released. On 21 July 1969, Lim wrote two letters: one addressed to Lee Kuan Yew, and one to Lee Siew Choh. In those letters, Lim stated that he had "completely lost confidence in the international communist movement", and that "communism is not as ideal as what we think it is". In the letter, Lim also resigned from the Barisan Sosialis, marking an end to his political career.

== Later years ==
Lim was released along with Wong Chui Wan, his fiancée and a former colleague in the General Employees Union along Middle Road. They married in 1970, and had two sons, Lim Zi Kuan and Lim Ziyi. In England, he worked odd jobs (at one point selling fruits in London), and also tried to nurse himself back to health. However, his condition remained fragile. In 1980, he suffered a heart attack and underwent a bypass operation in 1982.

In 1984, Lim returned to Singapore with his family and lived in Serangoon Gardens. He died of a heart attack on 5 February 1996.

== Legacy ==
Lim's achievements include co-founding the PAP, galvanising the trade unions against colonialism, and predicting correctly that the marriage of Malaya and Singapore as a single country would be short-lived. Yet, these achievements have generally been overshadowed by the allegations that:

- He was a communist, and that Singapore could have become communist; and
- He was the mastermind behind numerous subversive activities against the government.

=== Debate over communist leanings ===
There are many contradictions based on historical accounts. The British government in the 1950s had classified Lim as a "communist" in their documents, which have now been declassified. Although Lim claimed that he had not known the Anti-British League he joined had communist ties, the Special Branch's notes of Lim's activities contradicted this, such as Lim giving a talk in commemoration of Joseph Stalin's death to his ABL subordinates. Philip Moore, the deputy high commissioner in Singapore, stated in confidential correspondence in September 1961 that Lim "was a really clever United Front Communist operator". The PAP had also labelled Lim and his faction as "communist". Official records of a meeting between Lord Selkirk, Lim and Fong Swee Suan also stated that when Lim and Fong were asked if they were communists, they "failed to give a clear answer". However, accounts from Chin Peng, the secretary-general of the Communist Party of Malaya (CPM) at the time, did not recall Lim as a key figure of the CPM, and also said that the Barisan was not controlled by them.

Apart from the letters he wrote upon his release in 1969, Lim had also denied consistently that he was a communist. He did so for the last time in 1995, in the final interview he gave before he died:

"To brand someone as communist at that stage was the best and most convenient way to put him in jail... Of course, my brief period of association with the Anti-British League had become a "useful pretext" to brand me as a communist. But was it my mistake or the mistake of history that I had become a member of the ABL at that time?"

=== Debate over subversive activities ===
The official narrative suggested that Lim was behind numerous labour disputes that eventually descended into rioting, such as the Hock Lee bus riots and the Chinese middle school riots. After the war, the British became more paternalistic towards labour issues, resisting collective bargaining and seeking to depoliticise the labour movement. Without an avenue to seek redress, workers, who were often exploited and underpaid, had little choice but to fight back through more extreme methods. Lim was arrested and detained on the charge that he masterminded the riots, although the speech he made might not even have been inflammatory.

In one of his last interviews, Lim also said that between 1961 and 1963, he was responsible for "restraining the situation" to ensure that there was no violence following the referendum on merger. It was also noted in the minutes of a Barisan Sosialis meeting on 30 September 1962 that even having been defeated by the PAP in the referendum that they agreed to keep using "peaceful constitutional processes" to win elections. His arrest in February 1963, if legitimate, contradicts his personal accounts and the archived records of the British.

== Cultural depictions ==
In 2010, Meira Chand's historical novel A Different Sky published by Harvill Secker featured Lim getting elected, along with fellow People's Action Party candidate, Lee Kuan Yew, to the Legislative Assembly at the climax.

In May 2015, comics artist Sonny Liew released the graphic novel The Art of Charlie Chan Hock Chye, featuring Lim, his life story and his political rival Lee Kuan Yew. Upon its release, the National Arts Council withdrew a S$8,000 publishing grant as it found that "the retelling of Singapore's history in the graphic novel potentially undermines the authority of legitimacy of the Government and its public institutions".

In July 2015, actor Benjamin Chow played Lim in The LKY Musical opposite Adrian Pang's Lee Kuan Yew, directed by Steven Dexter. The Straits Times' critic, Corrie Tan noted that "the musical's designated anti-hero, Lim Chin Siong, is thankfully not relegated to the ranks of villainy and one-note declarations... the charismatic left-wing leader, with his compelling oratory and rapport with the common man [is portrayed]". During the musical's run, actor Chow published a blog post, later removed, on how the writers had been "extremely open to input" from the Ministry of Communications and Information.

In September 2015, Jonathan Lim's Chestnuts 50 The UnbelYeevable Jubilee Edition live parody sketch show featured a 'bromance' between Lim and Lee.
