= Mohamed Sidik =

Singaporean politician (1897–1972)

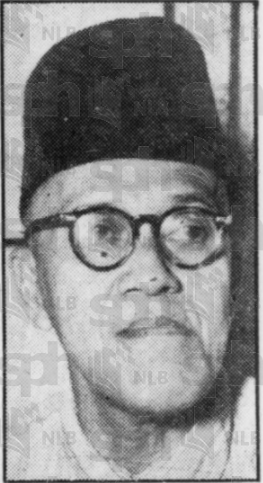
- Sidik c. 1951

Member of the Legislative Assembly for Southern Islands Constituency
- In office 22 April 1955 – 31 March 1959
- Preceded by: Constituency established
- Succeeded by: Ahmad Jabri bin Mohammed Akib

Personal details
- Born: Mohamed Sidik bin Haji Abdul Hamid; 21 February 1897 Bussorah Street, Singapore, Straits Settlements
- Died: 12 July 1972 (aged 75) Singapore General Hospital, Outram, Singapore
- Resting place: Bidadari Cemetery
- Party: Malay Union
- Other political affiliations: United Malay National Organisation
- Children: 4
- Education: Raffles Institution

Mohamed Sidik bin Haji Abdul Hamid (21 February 1897 – 12 July 1972) was a Singaporean politician and civil servant. He was a member of the Malay Union before he left in 1957 and joined the Singapore branch of the United Malays National Organisation (UMNO). He served as the legislative assemblyman representing Southern Islands Constituency from 1955 to 1959 after being elected with 50.57% in the 1955 general election. He also served as the Assistant Education Minister.

== Early life and education ==
Mohamed Sidik was born on 21 February 1897 at Sultan Road (now known as Bussorah Street) and studied at Raffles Institution. He worked as a clerk. He spent 33 years working at the Customs Department as a senior preventive officer.

Sidik was also the vice-president of the south zone of the Malay Football Association of Malaya and the president of the Malay Union.

== Career ==
In 1952, Sidik and members of the Malay Union protested against the construction of a park in Geylang. In 1954, Sidik stated that the Malay Union had not joined Labour Front.

In 1955, he contested in the 1955 Singaporean general election for Southern Islands Constituency. He was the only candidate of the Malay Union to be participating. He became the Member of Parliament (MP) representing Southern Islands Constituency after he won with 50.57% of the vote against Progressive Party member Hollupatherage James Caldera Kulasingha, who got 49.43%. Sidik also won with the narrowest margin of just 1.15%.

In 1956, he left the Malay Union after serving as its president for four years. This happened after he and Inche H. M. Hassan donated a refrigerator to the Singapore branch of the British Red Cross under their names instead of the Malay Union's. He was succeeded by Tengku Ismara Raja after he lost to with 17 votes compared to his 26. After he left, he joined the Singapore branch of the United Malays National Organisation (UNMO).

Afterwards, Sidik stated that he was still the representative of the Malay Union despite leaving as he was elected on the union's ticket. In 1958, he opened Hua Yi Middle School.

During the 1959 Singaporean general election, he contested in Siglap Single Member Constituency against 7 other candidates. He had originally wanted to contest in Southern Islands Constituency again, but lost his nomination to Inche Ahmad Jabri by four votes. During his rally speech, he stated that there would be "no happiness if People's Action Party comes into power." He was unsuccessful, only garnering 11.05% of the vote.

== Death ==
He died on 12 July 1972 in the Singapore General Hospital and was interred in the Bidadari Cemetery on the same day.
