= Eunos MRT station =

Mass Rapid Transit station in Singapore

Eunos EW7 友诺士 யூனுஸ்
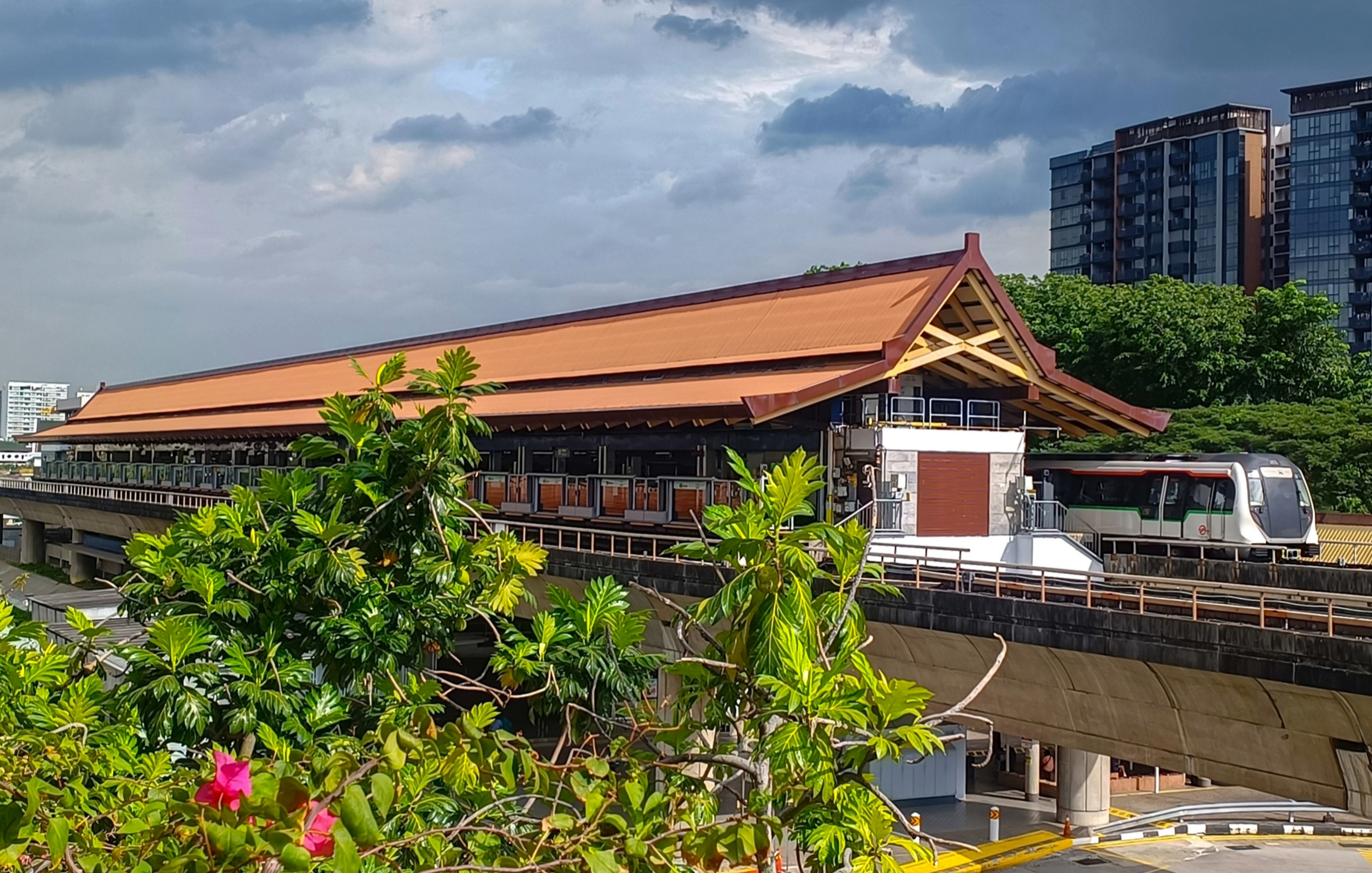
- The exterior of Eunos station

General information
- Location: 30 Eunos Crescent; Singapore 409423
- Coordinates: 1°19′11″N 103°54′11″E
- System: Mass Rapid Transit (MRT) station
- Owner: Land Transport Authority (LTA)
- Operator: SMRT Trains (SMRT Corporation)
- Line: East–West Line
- Platforms: 2 (1 island platform)
- Tracks: 2
- Connections: Eunos Bus Interchange

Construction
- Structure type: Elevated
- Platform levels: 1
- Cycle facilities: Yes
- Accessible: Mostly
- Architect: Scott Danielson
- Architectural style: Malay (Note: Also described by The Straits Times in an article as "Minangkabau".) (roof)

History
- Opened: 4 November 1989; 37 years ago

Services
Preceding station	Mass Rapid Transit	Following station
Kembangan towards Pasir Ris	East–West Line	Paya Lebar towards Tuas Link
Track layout
Location
- Location within Singapore Rail

Eunos MRT station (Note: /ˈjuːnoʊs, -ɒs/ YOO-nohss or YOO-noss) is an elevated Mass Rapid Transit (MRT) station on the East–West Line in Geylang, Singapore. Operated by SMRT Trains, the station is connected to the Eunos Bus Interchange. It also provides access to other surrounding landmarks such as the Masjid Darul Aman, Eunos Crescent Market and Food Centre, and Mangala Vihara Buddhist Temple.

Eunos station appeared in plans for the initial MRT system in May 1982, and it was designated to be under Phase IIA of the MRT. Construction of the station began in January 1986 with a joint venture between Oh Teck Thye and Okumura Corporation. The former was put under receivership (a process in which the management of an organisation's financial assets is transferred to another party) in December 1986 as it failed to repay its debts to the United Overseas Bank. The joint venture was terminated, with Okumura continuing the project alone. Eunos, along with 9 other stations from Marina Bay to Tanah Merah, opened on 4 November 1989. Following Eunos's opening, there were multiple instances of design-related issues for stairs connected to the station. Platform screen doors were installed at Eunos in 2011.

In contrast to other elevated Phase IIA stations, which have domed roofs, Eunos has a traditional Malay roof as it is located in a Malay neighbourhood. The station also has two murals created by local artist Erica Wee as part of SMRT's heritage-themed Comic Connect public art display, which showcases the history of Eunos as well as Katong and Joo Chiat.

== History ==
=== Planning, construction, and opening ===
The Mass Rapid Transit (MRT) system was conceptualised in a 1971 study conducted by the Singapore Government and the United Nations Development Programme. The study – which assessed land-use transportation needs – concluded that Singapore would need a rail transit system by 1992. Further studies and debates on the feasibility of building a rapid transit system took place from 1972 to 1980, with Eunos station appearing in initial plans by May 1982. Eunos was proposed to be constructed as part of the 32.6 kilometres (20.3 mi) East–West Line (EWL), which was to have 22 stations and run from Jurong West to Bedok. On 30 May 1982, communications minister Ong Teng Cheong confirmed that the government approved construction of the MRT; the system was planned to be constructed in three phases, with Eunos part of "Phase II", which was 40 km (25 mi) long and composed of 22 stations. (Note: Although previous studies concluded that the EWL should be constructed first, the government chose to construct the North–South Line (NSL) first, another line proposed in those studies, though The Straits Times noted that this would not imply that the NSL would have to be built first before the EWL can begin construction.) Phase II would be constructed in different sections, with Eunos specifically part of "Phase IIA", which consisted of 13 stations from City Hall to Pasir Ris. Stations under Phase II were planned to start construction while Phase I stations are under construction to ensure that the MRT would be fully open by the early 1990s.

From May to June 1984, the Mass Rapid Transit Corporation (MRTC) called for the prequalification of consultants to design the civil, architectural, and structural works for Phase IIA stations. Ten companies were shortlisted by July. The MRTC awarded the contract to an American–Singapore consortium between De Leuw Cather, Wilbur Smith & Associates, Skidmore Owings Merrill, and Singaporean firm RSP Architects in October for S$11.5 million (1984) (US$5.39 million). The Straits Times reported in November that Phase II was ahead of schedule by two years due to the successful timing for Phase I. By May 1985, there were seven tenderers that prequalified for Contract 303, which initially detailed the construction of Paya Lebar station and a viaduct from Paya Lebar to Eunos. Ultimately, the contract was awarded to a Japanese–Singaporean joint venture between Okumura Corporation and Oh Teck Thye, which had the lowest price among five other tenderers, for S$60 million (1985) (US$27.27 million) in December 1985. Okumura had a 60% interest in the contract whilst Oh Teck Thye had 40%. By then, the contract also included the construction of Eunos and viaducts to Kembangan station.

Work on Contract 303 began in December 1985, and construction for Eunos began in January 1986; the project was expected to be completed by December 1988. By February 1986, 41% of the contract had been completed. In July, Swiss–Singaporean company VSL Singapore was awarded the subcontract for the supply of post-tensioned cables and precast beams for the station's viaducts. The joint venture between Okumura and Oh Teck Thye was terminated on 30 December 1986, after which the former undertaking all the responsibilities of Contract 303. Oh Teck Thye owed S$3 million (1987) (US$1.42 million) to the United Overseas Bank (UOB) and was placed under receivership of Peat Marwick Mitchell when it failed to repay its debts. Meanwhile, Okumura requested permission to take over Oh Teck Thye's part of the contract. Soon Neo Lim of The Business Times described it as "the first case of a joint-venture split in the MRT Project". By December 1987, Eunos was expected to be completed by September 1989.

Although stations in the City Hall–Changi stretch were initially expected to commence operations by December 1989, The Straits Times reported in February 1989 that Phase IIA was ahead of schedule and could commence operations in the last quarter of the year. Civil works for Eunos were fully completed by April 1989 and from August, test runs were conducted on the City Hall–Tanah Merah (Note: Changi station was renamed to Tanah Merah in March 1987.) stretch to check the trains and tracks. By then, communications minister Yeo Ning Hong announced that stations within the City Hall–Tanah Merah stretch would open on 18 November, though by September, the opening date was moved ahead two weeks as the test runs were ahead of schedule. Eunos, along with 9 other stations between Marina Bay and Tanah Merah, opened on 4 November 1989.

=== After opening ===
In February 1996, a flight of stairs from the station's terrace to the street level underwent repairs after it had sunk into the ground. The difference between the concrete of the terrace and the soft soil of the ground resulted in a 40-centimetre (16 in) drop, which posed a risk for elderly commuters and young children. In August 2006, a letter written by a member of the public was sent to Today, who observed that the stairs at the station's south front exit "[led] to nowhere". The author also observed that a set of steps connected to a ramp near Eunos Food Centre at the east side of the station "assumes the wheelchair bound can suddenly get up and walk the [steps connected to the ramp]". SMRT Corporation clarified that the first set of stairs was meant to connect a carpark to the station, whilst the ramp was originally not meant for wheelchair users. It added that works were underway to fix the first set of stairs, which was uneven due to sinking into the ground, and to remove the ramp's stairs to make it wheelchair-accessible.

On 5 December 2000 at 8:15 am, a man fell on the eastbound track just as a train was entering the station. (Note: The New Paper reported on the day of the accident that the man jumped onto the track, but news articles published a day after the accident say that the man fell onto the track. The man's family speculated that he may have fallen off the platform out of fright from the sound of the oncoming train.) The train struck the man, trapping him between two of its cabins. He was rescued by emergency forces but died an hour later. Following an increase in track intrusions, the Land Transport Authority (LTA) and SMRT decided to install platform screen doors at all elevated MRT stations. After several successful tests at different stations, works to install half-height platform screen doors were expected to start in 2010; they were installed at Eunos by August 2011.

== Details ==
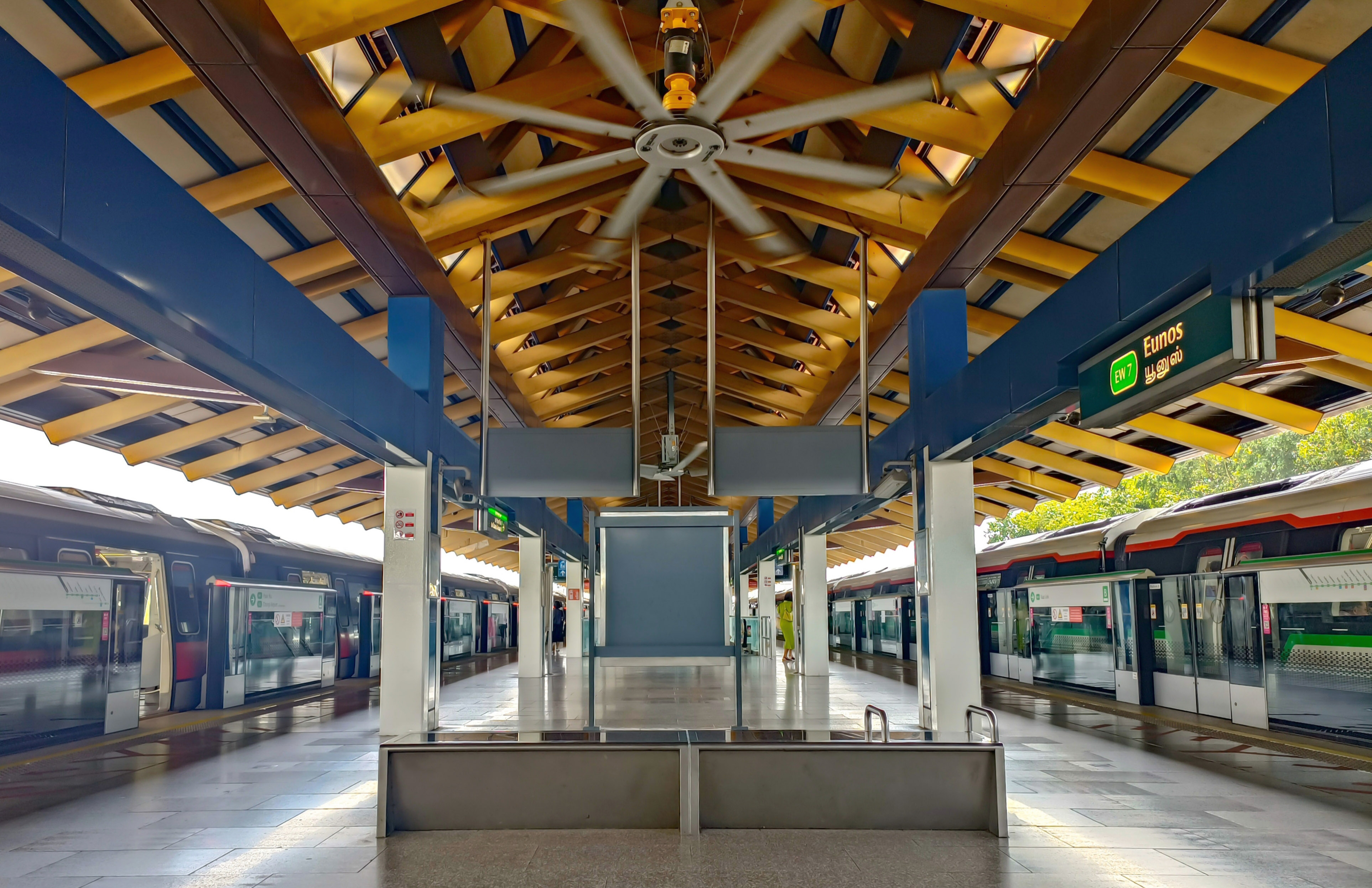
The roof of Eunos station is based on traditional Malay-style architecture.

Eunos station is on the EWL with the station code EW7, situated between Kembangan and Paya Lebar. Under the New Rail Financing Framework, it is owned by the Land Transport Authority. The station had the code E6 at opening and received its current station code in August 2001 as part of a system-wide campaign to cater to the expanding MRT system. As part of the EWL, Eunos is operated by SMRT Trains. The station operates from 5:45 am to 12:25 am daily; train frequencies vary from 2 to 5 minutes during peak hours to an average of 5 minutes for off-peak hours.

The station, located in the Geylang planning area of the Central Region, runs alongside Sims Avenue and is next to Eunos Crescent. It has three exits that serve surrounding amenities such as the Eunos Bus Interchange, Masjid Darul Aman, Eunos Crescent Market and Food Centre, Mangala Vihara Buddhist Temple, and the Kampong Ubi Police Post. Eunos station is mostly wheelchair-accessible and has bicycle facilities.

Eunos is a two-story, elevated station. The station's concourse, designed to be column-free, has a ticketing office and the electrical and mechanical plant rooms. Like many stations on the initial MRT network, the station's platforms are in the island platform configuration; the platform level is supported by the columns of the station's rail viaducts and has the signalling and telecommunications room. Unlike other stations on the City Hall–Pasir Ris stretch, which have domed roofs, the station has a traditional Malay-styled roof made of profiled steel roof sheeting. This was part of SMRT's idea to give certain MRT stations "an ethnic look", with Parsons Brinckerhoff's Scott Danielson – the designer of Eunos station – stating that "the more [he travelled], the more disturbed [he became by] architects failing to reflect their own culture", and so took inspiration from local architecture when designing stations. The design was initially meant for Khatib and Yishun as they were near kampongs. According to Danielson, the design was positively received by the Architectural Review Panel and other government agencies, resulting in Parsons Brinckerhoff and Marshall Consultants, the design consultants for Phase IIB stations, being appointed to design Eunos station in a similar manner as the station is located in a Malay neighbourhood and was next to Malay cultural centre that was to be built. (Note: The roofs of Yishun and Khatib stations were redesigned to be colonial-style so that Eunos's roof would be unique to the Malay cultural centre.) As a part of SMRT's heritage-themed Comic Connect public art display, there are two murals created by local artist Erica Wee which depicts the history of Katong, Joo Chiat, and Eunos. The murals took eight months to complete, including the design concept, and were unveiled in September 2023. Wee, who had returned to Singapore after 15 years of working in Kuala Lumpur, commented that the murals were "the best homecoming gift" for her as they contain elements of her childhood.
