= Southern Islands Constituency =

Former election constituency of Singapore

Southern Islands Constituency was a constituency in Singapore. It existed from 1955 to 1968 and included Sentosa, Pulau Brani, Kusu Island and St John's Island.

== Member of Parliament ==
Election	Member of Parliament	Party
1955	Mohamed Sidik bin Abdul Hamid	MU
1959	Ahmad Jabri bin Mohammed Akib	PKMS
1963	Ya'acob bin Mohammed	PAP

== Electoral results ==
Note: The Elections Department does not include rejected votes when calculating the vote shares of candidates. Hence, all candidates' vote shares will total to 100% at any given election (may not appear so in multi-way contests due to rounding).

=== Elections in 1950s ===
General Election 1955: Southern Islands
Party	Candidate	Votes	%	±%
Malay Union	Mohamed Sidek bin Abdul Hamid	1,233	50.6	
PP	Hollupatherage James Caldera Kulasingha	1,205	49.4	
Majority		28	1.2	
Turnout		2,476	69.8	
Registered electors		3,548		
Malay Union win (new seat)				

General Election 1959: Southern Islands
Party	Candidate	Votes	%	±%
UMNO	Ahmad Jabri bin Mohammad Akib	2,598	53.7	
PAP	Kum Teng Hock	1,225	25.3	
LSP	Mohammed Ismail bin Haji Mohammed Hussain	1,012	20.9	▼28.5
Majority		1,373	28.4	▲27.2
Turnout		4,879	91.6	▲21.8
Registered electors		5,325		▲50.1
UMNO gain from Malay Union		Swing	▲52.2	

=== Elections in the 1960s ===
General Election 1963: Southern Islands
Party	Candidate	Votes	%	±%
PAP	Ya'acob bin Mohamed	2,764	55.4	▲30.1
Singapore Alliance Party	Ahmad Jabri bin Mohammad Akib	2,224	44.6	▼9.1
Majority		540	10.8	▼17.6
Turnout		5,048	96.4	▲4.8
Registered electors		5,236		▼1.7
PAP gain from Singapore Alliance Party		Swing	▲19.6	

Note: PKMS became part of the Singapore Alliance (SA) before the 1963 general election.

== Historical maps ==
1955 General Election
