= Geylang East =

- Subzone of Geylang Planning Area

Other transcription(s)
  - Traditional Chinese: 芽籠東
  - Simplified Chinese: 芽笼东
  - Malay: Geylang Timur
  - Tamil: கேலாங் கிழக்கு
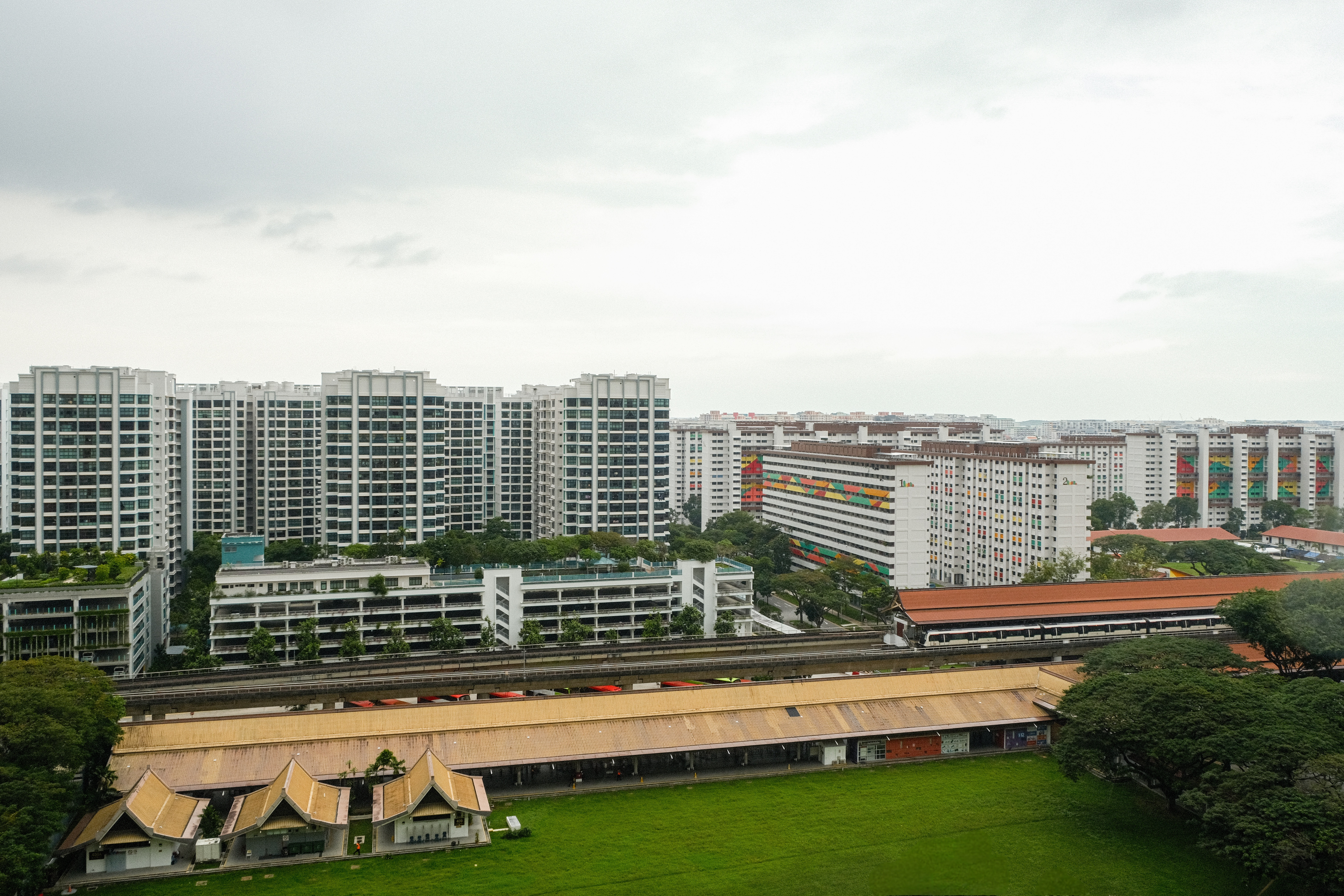
- HDB flats in Eunos, with Eunos MRT station in the foreground
- Interactive map of Geylang East
- Coordinates: 1°19′11.01″N 103°54′11.19″E
- Country: Singapore
- Region: Central Region
- Planning Area: Geylang

Area
  - Total: 2.58 km^{2} (1.00 sq mi)

Population (2026)
  - Total: 32,870
  - Density: 12,700/km^{2} (33,000/sq mi)

Geylang East, as a planning subzone, covers what is more commonly known as Eunos. (IPA: /ˈjuːnoʊs, -ɒs/ YOO-nohss or -noss). This is located in Geylang in the Central Region of Singapore. The vicinity is served by both Paya Lebar and Eunos MRT stations. This area is distinct from the Geylang East Central and estate, which is adjacent to and west of Eunos.

"Eunos" is also the name given to a street called Jalan Eunos which spans the area.

== Etymology and History ==
Eunos

Chinese name
- Traditional Chinese: 友諾士
- Simplified Chinese: 友诺士
Transcriptions
Standard Mandarin
- Hanyu Pinyin: Yǒunuòshì

Malay name
- Malay: Eunos

Tamil name
- Tamil: யூனுஸ்

The settlement was originally named Kampong Melayu, a large Malay village that used to include Kampong Ubi and Kaki Bukit areas. It was later renamed Eunos in honour of its founder, Mohamed Eunos bin Abdullah.

Eunos was the Chairman and co-founder of the Singapore Malay Union and the first Malay representative of the Legislative Council, the then governing body of Singapore. In 1927, he appealed to the government and was granted $700,000 that the Singapore Malay Union used for the purchase of 670 hectares of land, which later became known as Kampong Melayu. This land was used to provide a home for Malays who were affected by the building of Singapore’s first airport at Kallang.

== Amenities ==
=== Shopping Malls ===
Geylang East is home to 7 shopping malls, namely:

- Paya Lebar Square
- Paya Lebar Quarter (PLQ)
- SingPost Centre
- KINEX
- City Plaza
- Tanjong Katong Complex
- Joo Chiat Complex

== Transportation ==
=== Rail ===
Geylang East is served by two Mass Rapid Transit (MRT) stations, across two lines, the East West Line and the Circle Line. The two stations are:

- EW7 Eunos
- EW8 CC9 Paya Lebar

=== Bus ===
Geylang East also houses the Eunos Bus Interchange, which opened in December 1989. The bus interchange is operated by SBS Transit and contains 9 bus routes.
