= List of by-elections in Singapore =

This is a list of parliamentary by-elections in Singapore since 1965, with the names of the incumbent and victor and their respective parties. Where seats changed political party at the election, the result is highlighted: blue for a People's Action Party gain and red for a Workers' Party gain.

There have been a total of 31 by-elections. The first was held in January 1966 and the most recent in May 2016.

== By-elections ==
=== 13th Parliament ===
By-election	Date	Incumbent	Party	Winner	Party	Cause
Bukit Batok SMC	7 May 2016	David Ong	People's Action Party	Murali Pillai	People's Action Party	Resignation (due to personal indiscretions)

=== 12th Parliament ===
By-election	Date	Incumbent	Party	Winner	Party	Cause
Punggol East SMC	26 January 2013	Michael Palmer	People's Action Party	Lee Li Lian	Workers' Party of Singapore	Resignation (due to personal indiscretions)
Hougang SMC	27 May 2012	Yaw Shin Leong	Workers' Party of Singapore	Png Eng Huat	Workers' Party of Singapore	Resignation (due to personal indiscretions)

=== 8th Parliament ===
By-election	Date	Incumbent	Party	Winner	Party	Cause
Marine Parade GRC	19 December 1992	Goh Chok Tong; Lim Chee Onn; Othman Haron Eusofe; Matthias Yao	People's Action Party	Goh Chok Tong; Othman Haron Eusofe; Teo Chee Hean; Matthias Yao	People's Action Party	Resignation (for renewal of party ranks and to recontest)

=== 5th Parliament ===
By-election	Date	Incumbent	Party	Winner	Party	Cause
Anson SMC	31 October 1981	Devan Nair	People's Action Party	J. B. Jeyaretnam	Workers' Party of Singapore	Resignation (following election as President of Singapore)

=== 4th Parliament ===
By-election	Date	Incumbent	Party	Winner	Party	Cause
Anson SMC	10 February 1979	Perumal Govindaswamy	People's Action Party	Devan Nair	People's Action Party	Death
Geylang West SMC	31 January 1979 (Note: Election uncontested, candidate declared elected on Nomination Day.)	Yong Nyuk Lin	People's Action Party	Teh Cheang Wan	People's Action Party	Resignation (for renewal of party ranks)
Mountbatten SMC	10 February 1979	Ng Yeow Chong	People's Action Party	Eugene Yap Giau Cheng	People's Action Party	Resignation (for renewal of party ranks)
Nee Soon SMC	31 January 1979	Ong Soo Chuan	People's Action Party	Koh Lip Lin	People's Action Party	Resignation (for renewal of party ranks)
Potong Pasir SMC	10 February 1979	Baptist Ivan Cuthbert	People's Action Party	Howe Yoon Chong	People's Action Party	Resignation (for renewal of party ranks)
Sembawang SMC	10 February 1979	Teong Eng Siong	People's Action Party	Tony Tan Keng Yam	People's Action Party	Resignation (for renewal of party ranks)
Telok Blangah SMC	10 February 1979	Shaik Ahmad bin Abdul Haleem	People's Action Party	Rohan bin Kamis	People's Action Party	Resignation (for renewal of party ranks)
Bukit Merah SMC	23 July 1977	Lim Guan Hoo	People's Action Party	Lim Chee Onn	People's Action Party	Death
Radin Mas SMC	14 May 1977	N. Govindasamy	People's Action Party	Bernard Chen	People's Action Party	Death

=== 2nd Parliament ===
By-election	Date	Incumbent	Party	Winner	Party	Cause
Delta SMC	8 April 1970 (Note: Election uncontested, candidate declared elected on Nomination Day.)	Chan Choy Siong	People's Action Party	Yeo Choo Kok	People's Action Party	Resignation (for renewal of party ranks)
Havelock SMC	8 April 1970	Lim Soo Peng	People's Action Party	Hon Sui Sen	People's Action Party	Resignation (for renewal of party ranks)
Kampong Kapor SMC	18 April 1970	Lim Cheng Lock	People's Action Party	Yeo Toon Chia	People's Action Party	Resignation (for renewal of party ranks)
Ulu Pandan SMC	18 April 1970	Lee Teck Him	People's Action Party	Chiang Hai Ding	People's Action Party	Resignation (for renewal of party ranks)
Whampoa SMC	8 April 1970	Buang bin Omar Junid	People's Action Party	Augustine Tan Hui Heng	People's Action Party	Resignation (for renewal of party ranks)

=== 1st Parliament ===
By-election	Date	Incumbent	Party	Winner	Party	Cause
Bukit Panjang SMC	24 February 1967 (Note: Election uncontested, candidate declared elected on Nomination Day.)	Ong Lian Teng	Barisan Sosialis	Selvadurai Pathmanaban	People's Action Party	Resignation (part of mass resignations by members of Barisan Sosialis)
Havelock SMC	24 February 1967	Loh Miaw Gong	Barisan Sosialis	Lim Soo Peng	People's Action Party	Resignation (part of mass resignations by members of Barisan Sosialis)
Jalan Kayu SMC	24 February 1967	Tan Cheng Tong	Barisan Sosialis	Teo Hup Teck	People's Action Party	Resignation (part of mass resignations by members of Barisan Sosialis)
Tampines SMC	24 February 1967	Poh Ber Liak	Barisan Sosialis	Chew Chin Han	People's Action Party	Resignation (part of mass resignations by members of Barisan Sosialis)
Thomson SMC	7 March 1967	Koo Young	Barisan Sosialis	Ang Nam Piau	People's Action Party	Resignation (part of mass resignations by members of Barisan Sosialis)
Bukit Timah SMC	2 November 1966	Lee Tee Tong	Barisan Sosialis	Chor Yeok Eng	People's Action Party	Resignation (part of mass resignations by members of Barisan Sosialis)
Joo Chiat SMC	2 November 1966	Fong Kim Heng	People's Action Party	Yeoh Ghim Seng	People's Action Party	Resignation (due to ill health)
Jurong SMC	2 November 1966	Chia Thye Poh	Barisan Sosialis	Ho Kah Leong	People's Action Party	Resignation (part of mass resignations by members of Barisan Sosialis)
Chua Chu Kang SMC	1 March 1966	Chio Cheng Thun	Barisan Sosialis	Tang See Chim	People's Action Party	Resignation (part of mass resignations by members of Barisan Sosialis)
Crawford SMC	1 March 1966	T. Bani	Barisan Sosialis	Ramaswamy Sellappa	People's Action Party	Resignation (part of mass resignations by members of Barisan Sosialis)
Paya Lebar SMC	1 March 1966	Kow Kee Seng	Barisan Sosialis	Tay Boon Too	People's Action Party	Resignation (part of mass resignations by members of Barisan Sosialis)
Bukit Merah SMC	18 January 1966	Lim Huan Boon	Barisan Sosialis	Lim Guan Hoo	People's Action Party	Resignation (part of mass resignations by members of Barisan Sosialis)

== See also ==
- By-elections in Singapore
- Elections in Singapore
- Parliament of Singapore
