= 1968 Singaporean general election =

- 13 April 1968

All 58 seats in Parliament 30 seats needed for a majority
- Registered: 759,367 (Note: 674,484 of the 759,367 voters were registered in uncontested constituencies, leaving 84,883 voters able to vote.)
- Turnout: 91.83% (▼3.28pp)
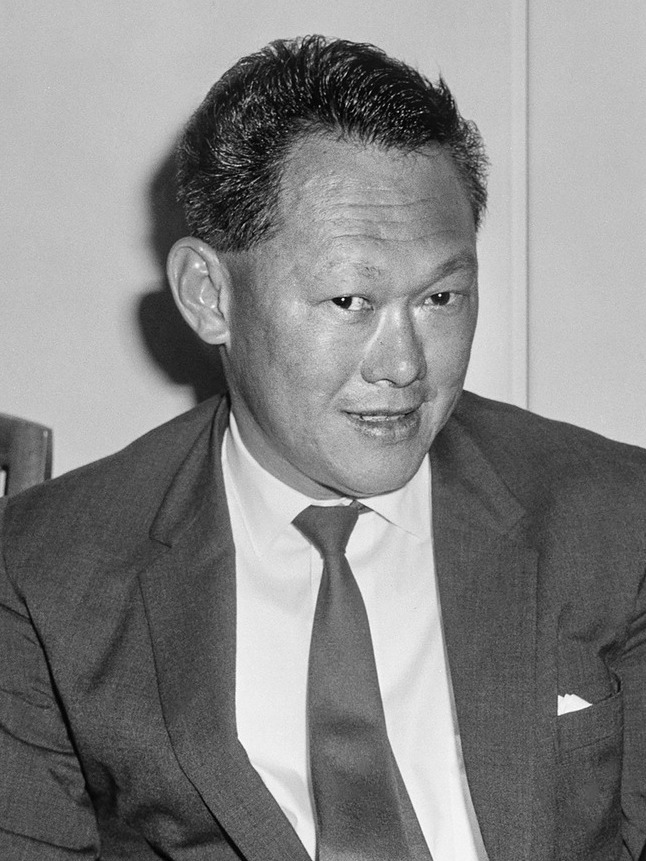
| | Majority party |
|---|---|
| Leader | Lee Kuan Yew |
| Party | PAP |
| Leader's seat | Tanjong Pagar |
| Last election | 46.93%, 37 seats |
| Seats won | 58 |
| Seat change | ▲21 |
| Popular vote | 65,812 |
| Percentage | 86.72% |
| Swing | ▲39.79pp |
- Results by constituency
Prime Minister before election
Lee Kuan Yew
PAP
Prime Minister after election
Lee Kuan Yew
PAP

General elections were held in Singapore on 13 April 1968 to elect all 58 members of Parliament. They were the third general elections since Singapore attained self-governance in 1959 and the first since gaining independence in 1965. The ruling People's Action Party (PAP), led by Prime Minister Lee Kuan Yew, won a landslide victory, securing all 58 seats in Parliament. Of these, 51 were uncontested, as opposition parties either failed to field candidates or withdrew altogether. As a result, the outcome of the elections was effectively determined before polling day.

The political context of the elections was shaped by a weakened and fragmented opposition. Barisan Sosialis (BS), the main opposition party formed by former PAP members, had boycotted Parliament after independence and subsequently withdrew from electoral politics altogether, citing concerns over political repression and the use of the Internal Security Act (ISA) against dissenting voices. Other minor parties joined the boycott or were either inactive or lacked the organisational capacity to mount a significant challenge. The PAP, in turn, used its control over state institutions and media to reinforce its message of stability, development and national unity during a time of regional uncertainty.

The nomination day saw a staggering 51 seats being uncontested by walkovers, thus voter participation was drastically limited, with only 84,883 (out of 759,367 eligible) voters actually resided in the remaining seven constituencies. While this result was consistent with electoral rules, it highlighted the constrained political environment and the absence of meaningful electoral competition. This election marked the beginning of a prolonged period of de facto one-party rule by the PAP, during which the party could pursue their policies without opposition, setting the tone for Singapore's political trajectory in the decades that followed.

== Background ==
In 1968, Singapore was a young independent nation facing significant challenges, including economic underdevelopment, security concerns and social integration. The government focused on industrialising the economy, attracting foreign investment, and developing a strong military, particularly in response to the announcement of the British military withdrawal East of Suez by 1971. The government promoted civic nationalist policies such as bilingualism, National Service (NS) and ethnic integration to avoid the re-emergence of racial strife. Singapore was previously admitted into the United Nations (UN) in September 1965, joining the international community.

=== Boycott and arrests ===
During the late 1960s, some local politicians, particularly from the left-wing Barisan Sosialis (BS), were against Singapore's newly found sovereignty and boycotted Parliament, believing it to be impractical and not genuine. BS boycotted the first session of Parliament which began on 8 December 1965, a few months after independence on 9 August. Its MPs also began resigning, leading to by-elections in 1966 and 1967, with eleven MPs resigning from Parliament in total. BS decided that their strategy to protest the "undemocratic acts" of the PAP was to carry their struggle outside of Parliament. One of these MPs, Chia Thye Poh, declared that the means of the struggle would be "street demonstrations, protest meetings and strikes".

In response, the PAP government viewed these boycotts as "conducting pro-communist activities with the intention of causing a communist revolution". The government arrested some BS politicians under the Internal Security Act (ISA), including Chia. By 1968, the PAP had complete supermajority control of Parliament.

=== Campaign ===
The remnants of BS boycotted the elections, arguing that the parliamentary system in Singapore was "undemocratic" and that participation would legitimise what they viewed as an "authoritarian regime", and several opposition parties also heeded its call. On nomination day, the leaders of Pertubuhan Kebangsaan Melayu Singapura (PKMS), formerly the local branch of the United Malay National Organisation (UMNO), Ahmad Haji Taff, and the Singapore Chinese Party (SCP), formerly the local branch of the Malaysian Chinese Association (MCA), Chng Boon Eng, turned up at the Elections Department (ELD) but did not file their nominations.

Ultimately, the only political party other than the PAP that contested in the election was the Workers' Party (WP), albeit in only two seats at Jalan Kayu and Nee Soon. In addition, five independents contested in five different constituencies – Farrer Park, Geylang Serai, Kampong Ubi, Moulemein and Lee Kuan Yew's seat of Tanjong Pagar. As a result, with only seven contested seats out of 57, the PAP returned to power on nomination day (and the only one where it have a supermajority of walkovers), a feat which was later repeated again in 1991, 1997 and 2001. All seven contests were straight contests, a similar situation would not occur again until 2006. Walkovers in constituencies held by the PAP also became a recurring feature in every subsequent general election since independence, with the exceptions being the 2015 and 2020 elections, both of which had no walkovers in all the constituencies.

The PAP winning every seat also became a recurring trend for subsequent elections, a trend that would last until 1981. It was also the last general election in which the campaign period lasted for two months; for subsequent elections it was restricted to only 9 to 10 days.

== Timeline ==
| Date | Event |
|---|---|
| 8 February | Dissolution of 1st Parliament |
| 17 February | Nomination Day |
| 13 April | Polling day |
| 6 May | Opening of 2nd Parliament |

== Electoral system ==
The 58 members of Parliament were elected in 58 single-member constituencies, an increase from 51 in the 1963 elections. The constituencies introduced or removed in the election, as well as constituencies with changes of boundaries, are shown on the table:

| Constituency | Changes |
New Constituencies
| Alexandra | Carved out from Queenstown constituency |
| Bukit Ho Swee | Carved out from Delta constituency |
| Kampong Chai Chee | Carved out from Kampong Kembangan, Siglap and Tampines constituencies |
| Kampong Ubi | Carved out from Geylang Serai constituency |
| Katong | Carved out from Mountbatten constituency |
| MacPherson; Potong Pasir | Carved out from Aljunied constituency |
| Whampoa | Carved out from Kallang constituency |
Defunct Constituencies
| Southern Islands | Absorbed to Jurong, Pasir Panjang and Telok Blangah constituencies |

== MPs not standing for re-election ==
11 incumbent MPs had stood down in the 1968 election, which include the co-founder of United People's Party S. V. Lingam, the wife of Devan Nair, Avadai Dhanam Lakshimi, and two Barisan Sosialis MPs.

| Incumbent | Party | Constituency | Elected in |
|---|---|---|---|
| Chan Sun Wing | BS | Nee Soon | 1959 |
| Chew Chin Han | PAP | Tampines | 1967 |
| Chow Chiok Hock | PAP | Ulu Pandan | 1963 |
| Avadai Dhanam Lakshimi | PAP | Moulmein | 1963 |
| R. A. Gonzales | PAP | Serangoon Gardens | 1963 |
| S. V. Lingam | PAP | Aljunied | 1959 |
| Mahmud Awang | PAP | Kampong Kapor | 1963 |
| S. Rajoo | PAP | Farrer Park | 1963 |
| Bernard Rodrigues | PAP | Telok Blangah | 1963 |
| Teo Hup Teck | PAP | Jalan Kayu | 1967 |
| Wong Soon Fong | BS | Toa Payoh | 1959 |

== New candidates ==
The election saw the debut of 19 candidates, 16 of which were from the PAP including future cabinet ministers Chua Sian Chin, Lee Chiaw Meng and Wong Lin Ken, as well as Low Yong Nguan, who later become an opposition candidate in future elections.

| New candidate | Party | Constituency |
|---|---|---|
| Abdul Aziz Karim | PAP | Kallang |
| Ch'ng Jit Koon | PAP | Tiong Bahru |
| Eric Cheong | PAP | Toa Payoh |
| Chua Sian Chin | PAP | MacPherson |
| Joseph Francis Conceicao | PAP | Katong |
| N. Govindasamy | PAP | Telok Blangah |
| Hwang Soo Jin | PAP | Jalan Kayu |
| T. T. Joseph | Independent | Moulmein |
| Lee Chiaw Meng | PAP | Farrer Park |
| Low Guan Onn | PAP | River Valley |
| Low Yong Nguan | PAP | Crawford |
| Mohamad Ghazali Ismail | PAP | Aljunied |
| Phua Bah Lee | PAP | Tampines |
| L. P. Rodrigo | PAP | Serangoon Gardens |
| Sha'ari Tadin | PAP | Kampong Chai Chee |
| Sia Khoon Seong | PAP | Moulmein |
| Sum Chong Meng | WP | Jalan Kayu |
| Tay Mook Yong | Independent | Kampong Ubi |
| Wong Lin Ken | PAP | Alexandra |

== Results ==
Popular vote
1. PAP (86.7%)
2. WP (4.02%)
3. Independents (9.27%)
Seats won
1. 51 seats (PAP; uncontested) (89.5%)
2. 7 seats (PAP; contested) (10.5%)

Opposition parties contested vote
| Party | Votes |
| Independents | 13.31% |
| WP | 13.22% |

Graph of the party split among 58 seats.
| Party | Votes | % | +/– | Seats | +/– |
|---|---|---|---|---|---|
| People's Action Party | 65,812 | 86.72 | +39.79 | 58 | +21 |
| Workers' Party | 3,049 | 4.02 | +3.97 | 0 | 0 |
| Independents | 7,033 | 9.27 | +8.10 | 0 | 0 |
| Total | 75,894 | 100.00 | – | 58 | +7 |
| Valid votes | 75,894 | 97.36 | | | |
| Invalid/blank votes | 2,058 | 2.64 | | | |
| Total votes | 77,952 | 100.00 | | | |
| Registered voters/turnout | 759,367 | 91.83 | | | |
Source: Nohlen et al., Singapore Elections

=== By constituency ===
Out of the seven seats contested (all by only two candidates), three had winning margins of over 75%, with the losers forfeiting their deposit. The result for Tanjong Pagar (94% to 6%) remains the biggest winning margin and percentage obtained to date.

| Constituency | Electorate | Party | Candidate | Votes | % | Swing | Margin |
|---|---|---|---|---|---|---|---|
| Alexandra | 13,317 | People's Action Party | Wong Lin Ken | Uncontested | | | |
| Aljunied | 14,472 | People's Action Party | Mohamad Ghazali Ismail | Uncontested | | | |
| Anson | 8,764 | People's Action Party | P. Govindaswamy | Uncontested | | | |
| Bras Basah | 9,718 | People's Action Party | Ho See Beng | Uncontested | | | |
| Bukit Ho Swee | 17,735 | People's Action Party | Seah Mui Kok | Uncontested | | | |
| Bukit Merah | 19,319 | People's Action Party | Lim Guan Hoo | Uncontested | | | |
| Bukit Panjang | 17,893 | People's Action Party | P. Selvadurai | Uncontested | | | |
| Bukit Timah | 16,769 | People's Action Party | Chor Yeok Eng | Uncontested | | | |
| Cairnhill | 12,287 | People's Action Party | Lim Kim San | Uncontested | | | |
| Changi | 15,594 | People's Action Party | Sim Boon Woo | Uncontested | | | |
| Chua Chu Kang | 12,879 | People's Action Party | Tang See Chim | Uncontested | | | |
| Crawford | 7,190 | People's Action Party | Low Yong Nguan | Uncontested | | | |
| Delta | 17,715 | People's Action Party | Chan Choy Siong | Uncontested | | | |
| Farrer Park | 10,290 | People's Action Party | Lee Chiaw Meng | 7,826 | 84.91 | ▲29.20 | 69.82 |
| Farrer Park | 10,290 | Independent | M. P. D. Nair | 1,391 | 15.09 | N/A | 69.82 |
| Geylang East | 16,185 | People's Action Party | Ho Cheng Choon | Uncontested | | | |
| Geylang Serai | 12,741 | People's Action Party | Rahmat Kenap | 9,363 | 83.01 | ▲35.00 | 66.02 |
| Geylang Serai | 12,741 | Independent | Darus Shariff | 1,916 | 16.99 | N/A | 66.02 |
| Geylang West | 14,609 | People's Action Party | Yong Nyuk Lin | Uncontested | | | |
| Havelock | 11,049 | People's Action Party | Lim Soo Peng | Uncontested | | | |
| Hong Lim | 10,388 | People's Action Party | Lee Khoon Choy | Uncontested | | | |
| Jalan Besar | 11,400 | People's Action Party | Chan Chee Seng | Uncontested | | | |
| Jalan Kayu | 12,878 | People's Action Party | Hwang Soo Jin | 9,581 | 82.30 | ▲51.57 | 64.60 |
| Jalan Kayu | 12,878 | Workers' Party | Sum Chong Meng | 2,060 | 17.70 | N/A | 64.60 |
| Joo Chiat | 12,335 | People's Action Party | Yeoh Ghim Seng | Uncontested | | | |
| Jurong | 11,445 | People's Action Party | Ho Kah Leong | Uncontested | | | |
| Kallang | 9,309 | People's Action Party | Abdul Aziz Karim | Uncontested | | | |
| Kampong Chai Chee | 17,636 | People's Action Party | Sha'ari Tadin | Uncontested | | | |
| Kampong Glam | 9,484 | People's Action Party | S. Rajaratnam | Uncontested | | | |
| Kampong Kapor | 10,818 | People's Action Party | Lim Cheng Lock | Uncontested | | | |
| Kampong Kembangan | 15,862 | People's Action Party | Ariff Suradi | Uncontested | | | |
| Kampong Ubi | 13,434 | People's Action Party | Ya'acob Mohamed | 9,797 | 81.87 | N/A | 63.74 |
| Kampong Ubi | 13,434 | Independent | Tay Mook Yong | 2,169 | 18.13 | N/A | 63.74 |
| Katong | 14,872 | People's Action Party | Joseph Francis Conceicao | Uncontested | | | |
| Kreta Ayer | 11,575 | People's Action Party | Goh Keng Swee | Uncontested | | | |
| MacPherson | 13,099 | People's Action Party | Chua Sian Chin | Uncontested | | | |
| Moulmein | 11,888 | People's Action Party | Lawrence Sia | 9,675 | 90.56 | ▲32.56 | 71.12 |
| Moulmein | 11,888 | Independent | T. T. Joseph | 1,009 | 9.44 | N/A | 71.12 |
| Mountbatten | 12,760 | People's Action Party | Ng Yeow Chong | Uncontested | | | |
| Nee Soon | 12,846 | People's Action Party | Ong Soo Chuan | 10,442 | 91.35 | ▲56.58 | 82.70 |
| Nee Soon | 12,846 | Workers' Party | Wong Hong Toy | 989 | 8.65 | N/A | 82.70 |
| Pasir Panjang | 12,394 | People's Action Party | Othman Wok | Uncontested | | | |
| Paya Lebar | 17,573 | People's Action Party | Tay Boon Too | Uncontested | | | |
| Potong Pasir | 11,782 | People's Action Party | S. Ramaswamy | Uncontested | | | |
| Punggol | 12,277 | People's Action Party | Ng Kah Ting | Uncontested | | | |
| Queenstown | 16,193 | People's Action Party | Jek Yeun Thong | Uncontested | | | |
| River Valley | 10,865 | People's Action Party | Low Guan Onn | Uncontested | | | |
| Rochore | 12,222 | People's Action Party | Toh Chin Chye | Uncontested | | | |
| Sembawang | 11,220 | People's Action Party | Teong Eng Siong | Uncontested | | | |
| Sepoy Lines | 11,409 | People's Action Party | Wee Toon Boon | Uncontested | | | |
| Serangoon Gardens | 9,454 | People's Action Party | L. P. Rodrigo | Uncontested | | | |
| Siglap | 11,627 | People's Action Party | Abdul Rahim Ishak | Uncontested | | | |
| Stamford | 9,919 | People's Action Party | Fong Sip Chee | Uncontested | | | |
| Tampines | 12,703 | People's Action Party | Phua Bah Lee | Uncontested | | | |
| Tanglin | 13,332 | People's Action Party | E. W. Barker | Uncontested | | | |
| Tanjong Pagar | 10,806 | People's Action Party | Lee Kuan Yew | 9,128 | 94.34 | ▲35.41 | 88.68 |
| Tanjong Pagar | 10,806 | Independent | R. Vetrivelu | 548 | 5.66 | N/A | 88.68 |
| Telok Ayer | 11,721 | People's Action Party | Ong Pang Boon | Uncontested | | | |
| Telok Blangah | 14,785 | People's Action Party | N. Govindasamy | Uncontested | | | |
| Thomson | 15,911 | People's Action Party | Ang Nam Piau | Uncontested | | | |
| Tiong Bahru | 16,532 | People's Action Party | Ch'ng Jit Koon | Uncontested | | | |
| Toa Payoh | 19,143 | People's Action Party | Eric Cheong | Uncontested | | | |
| Ulu Pandan | 13,289 | People's Action Party | Lee Teck Him | Uncontested | | | |
| Upper Serangoon | 13,373 | People's Action Party | Sia Kah Hui | Uncontested | | | |
| Whampoa | 12,854 | People's Action Party | Buang Omar Junid | Uncontested | | | |
Source: ELD

== Aftermath ==
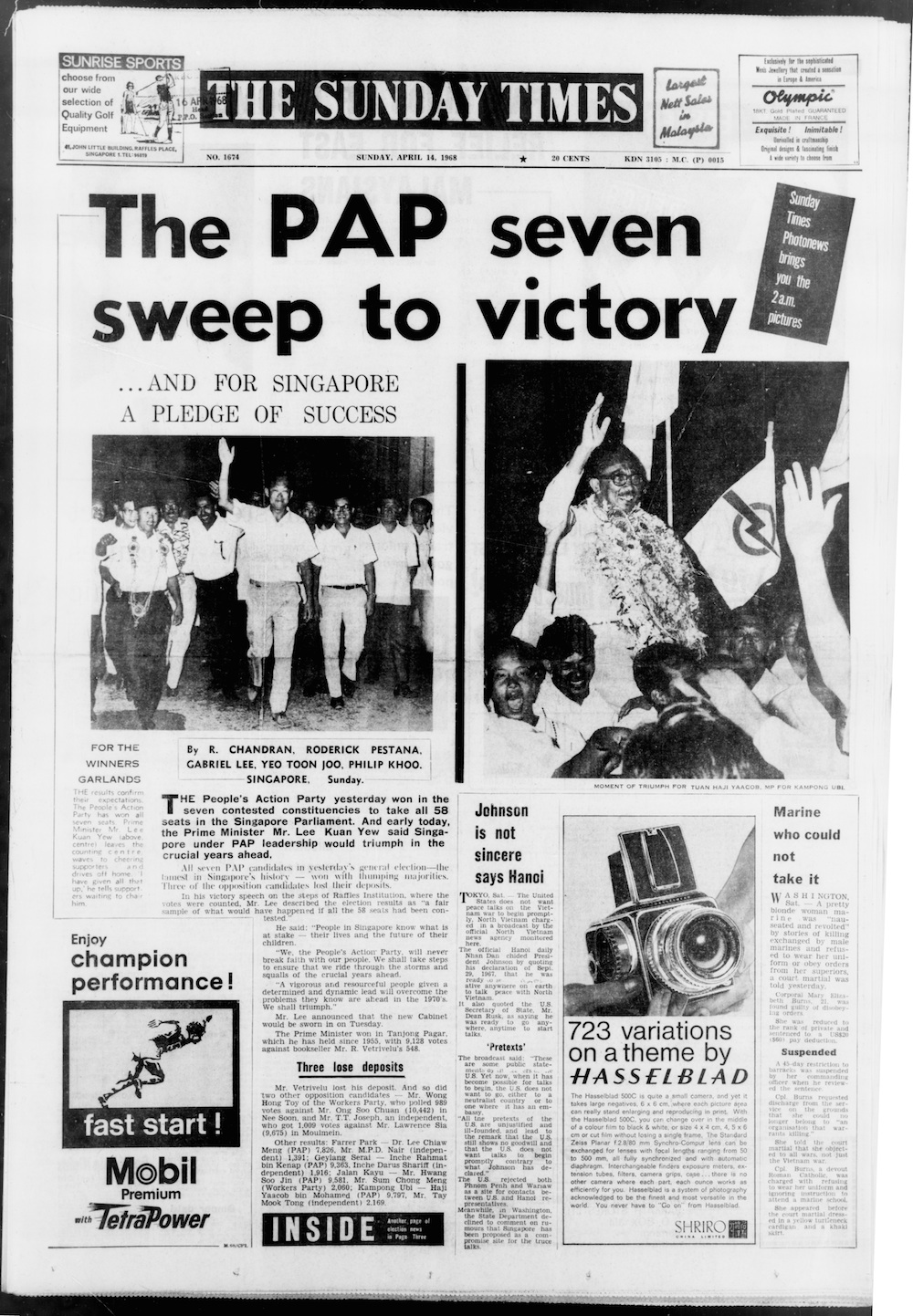
"The PAP seven sweep to victory." The headline on page 1 of The Sunday Times on 14 April

The aftermath of the election entrenched the PAP's dominance in Singapore's political sphere. With the main opposition parties including the Barisan Sosialis (BS) staging a boycott, the PAP secured all 58 seats in Parliament, effectively establishing a one-party legislature. This absence of electoral competition enabled the government to advance its policy agenda without parliamentary resistance, reinforcing its mandate to pursue rapid industrialisation, economic restructuring and a model of governance characterised by anocratic tendencies.

The opposition boycott had lasting ramifications for the political landscape. It precipitated the effective collapse of BS as a credible opposition force, with many of its leaders either detained or in exile. Despite attempts to re-enter the political arena in subsequent elections such as in 1972, the party never regained its former prominence. The absence of a viable opposition in Parliament diminished institutional checks and balances and weakened political accountability. Nevertheless, the PAP portrayed the boycott as a dereliction of democratic duty, framing it as evidence of the opposition's lack of resolve and as validation of its own claim to legitimate national leadership.

=== Legacy ===
In the years following the election, the PAP leveraged its overwhelming mandate to consolidate efforts in national development and state-building. In pursuit of multiracialism, the government initiated policies such as ethnic integration in public housing to ensure social harmony across diverse communities. Economically, it intensified industrialisation by empowering the Economic Development Board (EDB) to further expand areas like Jurong, transforming them into industrial hubs. To reinforce social cohesion and cultivate a disciplined citizenry, the government introduced National Service (NS) and established a nationwide education system that promoted bilingualism and emphasised civic virtues.

These programmes were implemented with minimal resistance, enabling rapid and comprehensive transformation of Singapore into a cohesive, stable and economically vibrant city-state. However, this period of accelerated modernisation also entailed the centralisation of authority, leading to criticism that the government had curtailed political pluralism and limited civic space. A key moment in this consolidation occurred in July 1968, when the PAP unanimously passed the Industrial Relations (Amendment) Act to curtail the labour movement of Singapore. This legislation curtailed the powers of trade unions by restricting the right to strike, narrowing the scope of collective bargaining and introducing compulsory arbitration in industrial disputes. These reforms diminished the autonomy of independent unions and reinforced the authority of the National Trades Union Congress (NTUC), which maintains close institutional ties with the PAP to this day.

While the nation experienced sustained economic growth and political stability, these developments came alongside the emergence of Singapore as a de facto one-party state. Opposition parties were not formally banned, yet they functioned under significant institutional and legal constraints. These included the extensive use of defamation lawsuits, the control of mainstream media and reliance on security legislation such as the Internal Security Act (ISA). While political dissent was not completely eliminated, it was confined within tightly regulated limits. The 1968 election marked a pivotal moment in Singapore's political development, entrenching a model of governance by the PAP that has been characterised by technocratic elitism and constrained electoral competition, although non-PAP parties would gradually re-emerge in the political sphere in subsequent decades.
