= List of members of the Singapore Parliament who died in office =

The following is a list of members of the Parliament of Singapore who died in office since independence in 1965.

== List ==
Member	Party	Constituency	Date of death	Age at death (years)	Cause	Ref
Ahmad Ibrahim	PAP	Sembawang Constituency	21 August 1962	35	Liver cancer	
Naidu Govindasamy	PAP	Radin Mas SMC	14 February 1977	48	Heart attack	
Lim Guan Hoo	PAP	Bukit Merah	3 August 1977	38	Stroke	
Perumal Govindaswamy	PAP	Anson	4 June 1978	67	Heart attack	
Hon Sui Sen	PAP	Havelock	14 October 1983	67	Heart attack	
Teh Cheang Wan	PAP	Geylang West SMC	14 December 1986	58	Suicide by drug overdose	
Tay Eng Soon	PAP	Eunos GRC	5 August 1993	53	Acute heart failure	
Ong Chit Chung	PAP	Jurong GRC	14 July 2008	59	Heart cancer	
Balaji Sadasivan	PAP	Ang Mo Kio GRC	27 September 2010	55	Colorectal cancer	
Lee Kuan Yew	PAP	Tanjong Pagar GRC	23 March 2015	91	Pneunmonia	

== See also ==
- List of by-elections in Singapore
