= 1970 Singaporean by-elections =

- 18 April 1970

5 seats to the Parliament of Singapore
- Registered: 25,310
- Turnout: 21,550 (85.14%)
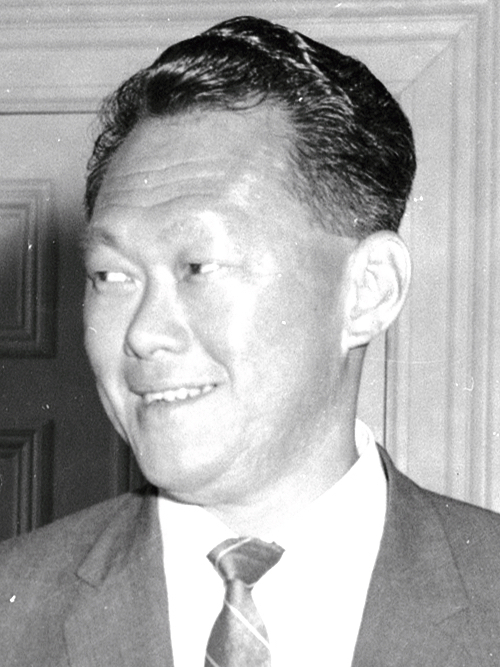
	Majority party	Minority party
Leader	Lee Kuan Yew	Chng Boon Eng; Vetrivelu Rengaswamy
Party	PAP	UNF
Seats won	5	0
Seat change	Steady	Steady
Popular vote	14,545	6,255
Percentage	69.93%	30.07%
MPs before election
- Chan Choy Siong
- Lim Soo Peng
- Lim Cheng Lock
- Lee Teck Lim
- Buang bin Omar Jumid
PAP
Elected MPs
- Yeo Choo Kok
- Hon Sui Sen
- Yeo Toon Chia
- Chiang Hai Ding
- Augustine Tan Hui Heng
PAP

The by-elections were held in April 1970, for five seats in the Parliament of Singapore, after the resignation of Members of Parliament of the People's Action Party (PAP). The end result saw PAP winning all five seats, three seats without a contest, and the remaining two via contest.

== Background ==
On 30 March 1970, five members from the People's Action Party were simultaneously resigned from the government per the party's renewal process, namely Chan Choy Siong, Lim Soo Peng, Lim Cheng Lock, Lee Teck Lim, and Buang bin Omar Jumid. The by-elections were scheduled to be held on 18 April.

Similar to the 1968 general election, no opposition parties stood except a newly formed United National Front formed from remnants of the now-defunct Singapore Alliance; it only contested the two vacant seats of Kampong Kapor and Ulu Pandan; this left the other three seats, Delta, Havelock and Whampoa, being uncontested during nomination day on 8 April.

Previously, prior to the 1968 election, there were mass resignations by each of the 11 (out of 13) members of Barisan Sosialis in the parliament over the course of the 1966 year, who opted to protest and "struggle for democracy" on the streets, had effectively removed all opposition from the parliament. It was only the second time since Independence where a resignation occurred by the governing PAP, after Joo Chiat MP Fong Kim Heng resigned on medical grounds on 18 October 1966.

Following Chan's resignation, the Parliament was left without a woman representation after the by-election, which would remain as it was until 14 years later in 1984.

== Results ==
By-election 1970: Delta
Party	Candidate	Votes	%	±%
PAP	Yeo Choo Kok	Walkover		
Majority				
Turnout		19,031		
PAP hold		Swing	N/A	

By-election 1970: Havelock
Party	Candidate	Votes	%	±%
PAP	Hon Sui Sen	Walkover		
Majority				
Turnout		11,498		
PAP hold		Swing	N/A	

By-election 1970: Kampong Kapor
Party	Candidate	Votes	%	±%
PAP	Yeo Toon Chia	5,527	62.4	N/A
United National Front (Singapore)	Chng Boon Eng	3,330	37.6	N/A
Majority		2,197	24.8	N/A
Turnout		9,195	83.7	N/A
PAP hold		Swing	N/A	

By-election 1970: Ulu Pandan
Party	Candidate	Votes	%	±%
PAP	Chiang Hai Ding	9,018	75.5	N/A
United National Front (Singapore)	Vetrivelu Rengaswamy	2,925	24.5	N/A
Majority		6,093	51.0	N/A
Turnout		12,355	86.3	N/A
PAP hold		Swing	N/A	

By-election 1970: Whampoa
Party	Candidate	Votes	%	±%
PAP	Augustine Tan Hui Heng	Walkover		
Majority				
Turnout		13,286		
PAP hold		Swing	N/A	
