= 1967 Singaporean by-elections =

- 7 March 1967

5 seats to the Parliament of Singapore
- Registered: 14,123
- Turnout: 11,624 (82.31%) ▼13.14%
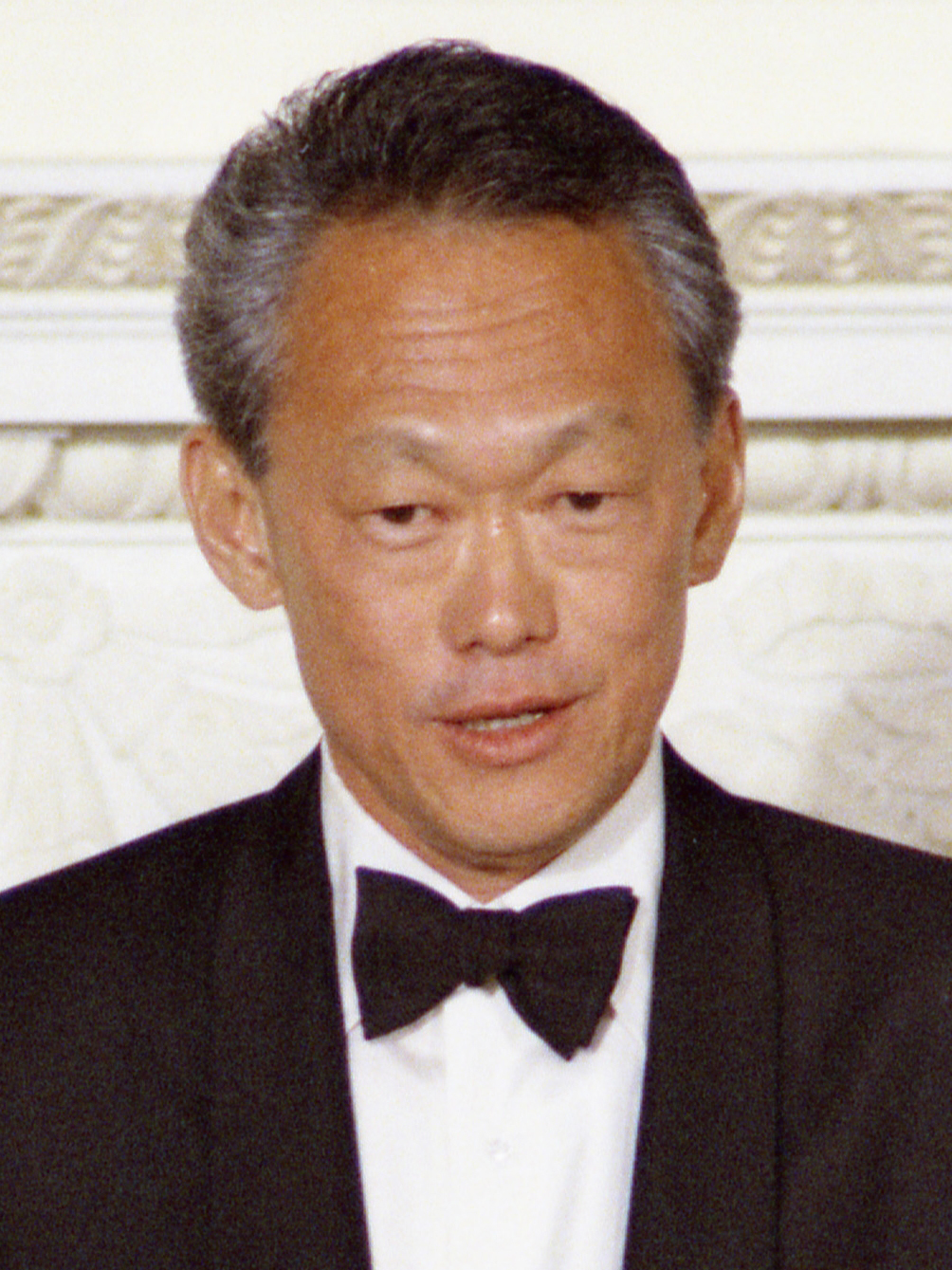
	Majority party
Leader	Lee Kuan Yew
Party	PAP
Seats won	5
Seat change	▲5
Popular vote	9,407
Percentage	83.59%
Swing	▲49.94%
MPs before election
- Ong Lian Teng
- Loh Miaw Gong
- Tan Cheng Tong
- Poh Ber Liak
- Koo Young
BS
Elected MPs
- P. Selvadurai
- Lim Soo Peng
- Teo Hup Teck
- Chew Chin Han
- Ang Nam Piau
PAP

The 1967 by-elections were held on 7 March 1967, precipitated following a series of resignations of Barisan Sosialis's MPs which occurred the year before on 5 December 1966.

== History ==
A total of 12 MPs resigned a year prior, 11 of which from Barisan Sosialis, who resigned their seats citing that Lim Huan Boon, who initiated the mass exodus, claimed Singapore's independence was "phony" because no discussion of Singapore's separation matter was made in the legislature. Six of the vacated seats had by-elections prior, while the other five, Koo Young, Loh Miaw Gong, Ong Lian Teng, Poh Ber Liak and Tan Cheng Tong, resigned on 5 December. The seats for Bukit Panjang, Havelock, Jalan Kayu, Tampines and Thomson, respectively, were therefore vacant, and polls adjourned on 7 March. On nomination day on 24 February, only Thomson had a contest involving a multi-cornered fight with two independents.

== Results ==
By-election 1967: Bukit Panjang
Party	Candidate	Votes	%	±%
PAP	P. Selvadurai	Walkover		
Majority				
Turnout		16,070		
PAP gain from BS		Swing	N/A	

By-election 1967: Havelock
Party	Candidate	Votes	%	±%
PAP	Lim Soo Peng	Walkover		
Majority				
Turnout		12,898		
PAP gain from BS		Swing	N/A	

By-election 1967: Jalan Kayu
Party	Candidate	Votes	%	±%
PAP	Teo Hup Teck	Walkover		
Majority				
Turnout		11,275		
PAP gain from BS		Swing	N/A	

By-election 1967: Tampines
Party	Candidate	Votes	%	±%
PAP	Chew Chin Han	Walkover		
Majority				
Turnout		16,481		
PAP gain from BS		Swing	N/A	

By-election 1967: Thomson
Party	Candidate	Votes	%	±%
PAP	Ang Nam Piau	9,407	83.6	+44.1
Independent	Madai Puthan Damodaran Nair	1,310	11.6	+11.6
Independent	Chan Yoke Kwong	537	4.8	+4.8
Majority		8,097	72.0	N/A
Turnout		11,624	82.3	−13.7
PAP gain from BS		Swing	N/A	

== Aftermath of this by election ==
Much like the previous year's by-election, oppositions would see downturn and the Barisan Sosialis lost credibility. By the end of the following year's election, the last two Barisan MPs Chan Sun Wing (Nee Soon) and Wong Soon Fong (Toa Payoh) had opted to flee the country in order to avoid being arrested by the Internal Security Department (ISD) as what happened to their colleague Chia Thye Poh and others, completing PAP's government monopoly.

The results in the by-election where both independent candidates had their election deposits forfeited proved that PAP would be dominant onto government control and trustworthiness of voting electorate. Opposition would not win any of the election again for the next 14 years until 1981.
