= Jalan Kayu Constituency =

Former electoral division in Singapore

Jalan Kayu
- Former constituency for the Parliament of Singapore
- Region: Singapore

Former constituency
- Created: 1959; 67 years ago
- Abolished: 1988; 38 years ago
- Seats: 1
- Member: Constituency abolished
- Replaced by: Cheng San GRC

Jalan Kayu Constituency was a constituency in Singapore which existed between 1959 and 1988.

== History ==
After the 1951 election, the present Jalan Kayu constituency constituted the majority of the Seletar ward; that ward was dissolved prior to the 1959 election, producing the Jalan Kayu ward, the then Thomson ward, and small parts of Nee Soon ward.

During the 1963 Singaporean general election, incumbent Tan Cheng Tong from People's Action Party seek another term but under Barisan Sosialis. While his vote share was slashed nearly by half, Tan managed to win the seat with a 7% majority.

Madai Puthan Damodaran Nair has contested here in every GE since the inception of this ward, with the exceptions in 1967 by-elections and 1968 elections where he stood as an independent candidate in Thomson and Farrer Park wards respectively. He had previously elected in Seletar ward, which has since evolved into this ward and also went through up and downs, from an end of almost being elected MP since the independence of Singapore in 1984 elections when he represented the Workers' Party of Singapore and subsequently offered but declined the Non-constituency Member of Parliament seat to lost his election deposit in 1963 elections when he was one of the candidate that entered into the multi-cornered fight's fray under the banner of Singapore Alliance.

In the 1984 election, the People's Action Party had held the ward by a narrow margin of 571 votes and Madai Puthan Damodaran Nair was offered the first and only Non-constituency Member of Parliament (NCMP) seat, only to reject it. The seat was subsequently offered to Tan Chee Kien, the second best performing but lost the election opposition candidate who ran in Kaki Bukit SMC under the Singapore United Front's banner as auxiliary NCMP who had also promptly declined the offer.

During the 1988 political reforms, the constituency was merged into the Cheng San Group Representation Constituency.

== Member of Parliament ==
Election	Member of Parliament	Party
Legislative Assembly of Singapore
1959	Tan Cheng Tong	PAP
1963	Tan Cheng Tong	BS
Parliament of Singapore
1967	Teo Hup Teck	PAP
1968	Hwang Soo Jin	PAP
1972	Hwang Soo Jin	PAP
1976	Hwang Soo Jin	PAP
1980	Hwang Soo Jin	PAP
1984	Heng Chiang Meng	PAP

== Electoral results ==
Note: The Elections Department does not include rejected votes when calculating the vote shares of candidates. Hence, all candidates' vote shares will total to 100% at any given election (may not appear so in multi-way contests due to rounding).

=== Elections in 1950s ===
General Election 1959: Jalan Kayu
Party	Candidate	Votes	%	±%
PAP	Tan Cheng Tong	4,837	62.28	
SPA	Madai Puthan Damodaran Nair	2,929	37.72	
Turnout		7,844	90.3	
PAP win (new seat)				

=== Elections in 1960s ===
General Election 1963: Jalan Kayu
Party	Candidate	Votes	%	±%
BS	Tan Cheng Tong	3,312	38.04	+38.04
PAP	Teo Hup Teck	2,676	30.73	−31.55
UPP	Lui Boon Phor	1,146	13.16	+13.16
SA	Madai Puthan Damodaran Nair	1,057	12.14	−25.58
Independent	Ong Yu Thoh	516	5.93	+5.93
Turnout		8,768	95.7	+5.4
BS gain from PAP		Swing		

1967 By Election: Jalan Kayu
Party	Candidate	Votes	%	±%
PAP	Teo Hup Teck	Walkover		
Turnout		11,275		
PAP gain from BS		Swing		

General Election 1968: Jalan Kayu
Party	Candidate	Votes	%	±%
PAP	Hwang Soo Jin	9,581	82.30	
WP	Sum Chong Meng	2,060	17.70	
Turnout		11,975	93.0	
PAP hold		Swing		

=== Elections in 1970s ===
General Election 1972: Jalan Kayu
Party	Candidate	Votes	%	±%
PAP	Hwang Soo Jin	8,283	59.42	−22.88
WP	Madai Puthan Damodaran Nair	5,137	36.86	+19.16
United National Front	Ong Seng Kok	518	3.72	+3.72
Turnout		14,148	94.4	+1.4
PAP hold		Swing	-22.88	

General Election 1976: Jalan Kayu
Party	Candidate	Votes	%	±%
PAP	Hwang Soo Jin	8,883	61.57	+2.15
WP	Madai Puthan Damodaran Nair	5,544	38.43	+1.57
Turnout		14,702	95.2	+0.8
PAP hold		Swing	+2.15	

=== Elections in 1980s ===
General Election 1980: Jalan Kayu
Party	Candidate	Votes	%	±%
PAP	Hwang Soo Jin	15,275	69.02	+7.45
WP	Madai Puthan Damodaran Nair	6,855	30.98	−7.45
Turnout		22,705	95.5	+0.3
PAP hold		Swing	+7.45	

General Election 1984: Jalan Kayu
Party	Candidate	Votes	%	±%
PAP	Heng Chiang Meng	11,985	51.22	−17.8
WP	Madai Puthan Damodaran Nair	11,414	48.78	+17.8
Turnout		23,908	95.6	+0.1
PAP hold		Swing	-17.8	

== See also ==
- Ang Mo Kio GRC
- Cheng San GRC
