= Seletar Constituency =

Former Singaporean constituency

Seletar
- Former constituency for the Legislative Council of Singapore and the Legislative Assembly of Singapore
- Region: North-East Region, Singapore
- Electorate: 9,402 (1955)

Former constituency
- Created: 1951
- Abolished: 1959
- Seats: 1
- Created from: Rural East; Rural West
- Replaced by: Jalan Kayu; Nee Soon; Serangoon Gardens; Thomson

Seletar Constituency was a single-member constituency of the Legislative Council and Legislative Assembly of Singapore between 1951 and 1959. It covered the Seletar area in North-East Region.

In 1951, the constituency was formed from Rural East and Rural West constituencies. The 1952 Seletar by-election remains the only occasion on which a candidate not from the People's Action Party won unopposed.

In 1955, parts of the constituency were separated to form Bukit Panjang, Sembawang and Serangoon constituencies.

In 1959, the constituency was abolished and split into Jalan Kayu, Nee Soon, Serangoon Gardens and Thomson constituencies.

== Member of Parliament ==
Year	Member of Parliament	Party
Legislative Council of Singapore
1951	Vilasini Menon	Independent
1952	Madai Puthan Damodaran Nair	Independent
Legislative Assembly of Singapore
1955	Madai Puthan Damodaran Nair	Independent

== Election results ==
=== Electoral results in the 1950s ===
General Election 1951: Seletar
Party	Candidate	Votes	%	±%
Independent	Vilasini Menon	1,467	42.7	
Labour Party	Gopalan Nair Nanupillai	1,043	30.3	
PP	V. Vayloo Pakirisamy	929	27.0	
Majority		424	12.4	
Turnout		3,478	69.2	
Registered electors		5,025		
Independent win (new seat)				

By-election 1952: Seletar
Party	Candidate	Votes	%	±%
Independent	Madai Puthan Damodaran Nair	Unopposed		
Registered electors		6,509		▲29.5
Independent hold				

General Election 1955: Seletar
Party	Candidate	Votes	%	±%
Independent	Madai Puthan Damodaran Nair	1,771	31.8	
Independent	Lek Poh Song	1,632	29.3	
DP	Tan Leong Teck	1,252	22.5	
LF	Khew Pee Ging	909	16.3	
Majority		139	2.5	▼9.9
Turnout		5,620	59.8	▼9.4
Registered electors		9,402		▲44.4
Independent hold				

== Historical maps ==
1955 General Election
