= 1952 Seletar by-election =

- 19 November 1952 (nomination)
- Registered: 6,509
| | Majority party |
|---|---|
| Candidate | Madai Puthan Damodaran Nair |
| Party | Independent |
| popular vote | unopposed |
Councilor before election
Vilasini Menon
Independent
Elected Councilor
Madai Puthan Damodaran Nair
Independent

The 1952 Seletar by-election for the Legislative Council of Singapore was scheduled on 20 December 1952, after the resignation of incumbent Vilasini Menon on 25 September 1952. Menon was charged with a criminal breach of trust in India, along with her lawyer husband.

The by-election did not take place as scheduled as its sole running candidate, Madai Puthan Damodaran Nair, was elected as the constituency's councilor in an uncontested walkover.

== Background ==
Vilasini Menon was elected as Legislative Councilor for the Seletar constituency of the Legislative Council of Singapore in the 1951 general election.

Menon and her lawyer husband was later charged with a criminal breach of trust in India. As a result, she voluntarily resigned her seat on 25 September 1952 which triggered a by-election in the Seletar constituency. The writ of election was issued on 28 October 1952 with nomination day set on 19 November.

== Campaign ==
Only the independent City Councilor Madai Puthan Damodaran Nair filed in his candidacy for the by-election.

== Election ==
Since Nair is the only candidate in the by-election, he was elected as a Legislative Councilor through a walkover. The by-election no longer took place as scheduled.

Nair was sworn into office on 16 December 1952. He initially refused to be sworn in unless the demands of the constituency's Naval Base Union members were met.

== Results ==
| Party | Candidate | Votes | % |
|---|---|---|---|
| Independent | Madai Puthan Damodaran Nair | Uncontested walkover | |
| Registered voters/turnout | | 6,509 | |
Source: Singapore Elections
