= Charles Toh =

Singaporean cardiologist

Charles Toh Chai Soon (born 1930) is a Singaporean cardiologist who is regarded as the "father of cardiology" in Singapore.

== Medical career ==
In 1967, Toh founded the Coronary Care Unit of Singapore General Hospital.

Toh was the Chairman of the 1972 Asia Pacific Congress of Cardiology, at the time also having been the cardiologist of then-Prime Minister Lee Kuan Yew. He had also been a physician of Benjamin Sheares during Sheares's recovery from vascular surgery.

Toh was also the personal physician of Teh Cheang Wan, pronouncing Teh dead at 10.20 am, 14 December 1986.

== Public service ==
Toh was appointed to the Public Service Commission in 1992.

== Personal life ==
Toh's son, Han Chong, is an oncologist and healthcare administrator.
