= M. P. D. Nair =

Singaporean politician (1920–1989)

- Nair, c. 1956

Minister for Communications and Works
- In office 3 February 1959 – 31 March 1959
- Chief Minister: Lim Yew Hock
- Preceded by: Francis Thomas (LF)
- Succeeded by: Position abolished

Member of the Legislative Assembly for Seletar Constituency (Note: Formerly the Legislative Council from 1952 to 1955.)
- In office 16 December 1952 – 31 March 1959
- Preceded by: Vilasini Menon (IND)
- Succeeded by: Constituency abolished
- Majority: 1952: N/A (walkover); 1955: 1,771 (31.8%)

Member of the City Council for South Ward (Note: Formerly the Municipal Commission prior to 1951.)
- In office 6 December 1950 – December 1953
- Preceded by: Abdul bin Samat (PP)
- Succeeded by: Manickavasagar Subramaniam (PP)
- Majority: 1950: 1,871 (65.8%)

Personal details
- Born: Madai Puthan Damodaran Nair; 12 March 1920 Cannanoor, Kerala, British Raj (present-day Kannur, India)
- Died: 15 January 1989 (aged 68) Singapore
- Resting place: Mount Vernon Columbarium
- Citizenship: Singapore (from 1957)
- Party: Workers' Party (1972–1984); Singapore Alliance Party (1963–1966); Singapore People's Alliance (1958–1966); Labour Front (1956–1958); Independent (1952–1956; 1966–1972); Labour Party (1948–1952)
- Spouse: Sushiela Nair (m. 1957)
- Children: 3
- Occupation: Politician; lawyer

Madai Puthan Damodaran Nair (12 March 1920 – 15 January 1989), commonly known as M. P. D. Nair, was a Singaporean politician and lawyer who served as the second minister for communications and works from February to March 1959. He represented Seletar Constituency in the Legislative Council from 1952 to 1955 and in the Legislative Assembly from 1955 to 1959.

Born in the British Raj, he came to Singapore after World War II. He was a founder-member of the Labour Party (SLP) in 1948 and contested unsuccessfully in the April 1949 and December 1949 Municipal Commission elections under their banner, before winning South Ward as an SLP candidate at the 1950 Municipal Commission election. During his term as a municipal commissioner (renamed to City Council in 1951), Nair had disputes with the SLP, culminating in his expulsion in April 1952. He went on to contest at the 1952 Seletar by-election as an independent, which he controversially won in a walkover.

At the 1955 general election, he won Seletar in a four-way fight as an independent candidate. He later joined the ruling Labour Front coalition and was appointed as an assistant minister to the chief secretary in 1956, which he served in until 1959. With Lim Yew Hock as the chief minister, Nair joined Lim's new political party, the Singapore People's Alliance (SPA), in 1958. He subsequently succeeded Francis Thomas as the minister for communications and works in the SPA government in February 1959, serving until the end of his term in March. Nair contested at the 1959 general election as an SPA candidate, but was unsuccessful. From 1959 to 1963, Nair studied law in the United Kingdom, being called to the bar in London. He unsuccessfully contested for Jalan Kayu at the 1963 general election under the Singapore Alliance Party's banner, of which the SPA was a member.

Nair then began contesting as an independent candidate, being unsuccessful at the 1966 by-election, the 1967 by-election, and 1968 general election. He later joined the Workers' Party (WP) and contested Jalan Kayu unsuccessfully at the next four general elections (1972, 1976, 1980, and 1984) as a WP candidate. His best performance was at the 1984 general election, where he garnered 48.8% of the vote and was offered a seat as a Non-constituency Member of Parliament (NCMP). However, he rejected the seat as the WP were against the NCMP scheme. He retired from politics prior to the 1988 general election and died the following year.

== Early life ==
Nair was born on 12 March 1920 in Cannanoor, Kerala, India, which was then-under British rule. He travelled to Sitiawan, Perak, in the 1930s, before moving to Singapore in the Straits Settlements after World War II. He was educated in India and was an insurance agent. Nair was of Malayalee descent. In Singapore, he worked as a civilian clerk for the Military Police Service. Nair was a founding member of the Army Civil Services' Union (ACSU), a body representing employees within the military civil service, and served as its vice-president in 1947.

== Early political involvement ==
In early 1948, Nair joined fellow unionists M. A. Majid and P. M. Williams to create a political party. Majid wanted to form a new labour party to divide the Malayan Communist Party's hold on the labour movement and planned to obtain the Indian vote in elections. Nair became a founder-member of the Labour Party (SLP), which was established on 1 September 1948. He was later responsible for bringing in Lim Yew Hock, a unionist who had large support from English-speaking workers, in 1949.

In March, he was announced as an SLP candidate ahead of the April 1949 Municipal Commission election, where he was the youngest candidate at 29-years-old. During the election, Nair contested for West Ward against C. F. J. Ess, Gaw Sien Khian, and Phyllis Eu Cheng Li, all of whom were Progressive Party (PP) candidates. His campaign symbol was a vase. He held a rally in Dhoby Ghaut, which saw appearances from SLP campaign organiser Francis Thomas and ACSU president S. S. Manyam, who both spoke in support of Nair. In the results of the election, Nair was unsuccessful and placed fourth with 293 votes, while Ess, Gaw, and Eu were elected as they were the top three with 431, 424, and 403 votes, respectively. Following the election, he was made the honorary general-secretary of the SLP.

In June, he spoke on behalf of the SLP their support of PP president C. C. Tan's plan to create legislature in protest of the White Australia policy. Nair described Australian immigration minister Arthur Calwell's policies as "a mad racialist ideology". In October, the SLP announced Nair as a candidate for the December 1949 Municipal Commission election. During the election, he contested for South Ward against the PP's Duncan Robertson. SLP campaign organiser V. J. Mendis expressed confidence in Nair winning a majority against Robertson. In the results, Nair lost narrowly by 31 votes to Robertson, who gained 654 votes against Nair's 623.

In June 1950, Nair was made one of three SLP vice-presidents. In July, he was announced as an SLP candidate for the upcoming 1950 Municipal Commission election, being planned to contest for South Ward. However, in August, Nair was suspended by the SLP for making disparaging comments about former SLP member Pat Johnson, stating that Johnson left the party after being "nursed" by them to a position of power; Johnson originally announced his intention to leave due to disagreements with the party. Following this decision, a group of SLP members resigned in protest of Nair's suspension, considering it to have been "not constitutional". Nair further defended his actions, stating that he retracted the statement in a private letter to Johnson and criticised the SLP for suspending him while he was overseas in India and thus unable to respond. He then offered the SLP to either withdraw their suspension or accept his resignation.

The SLP discussed the matter at a general council meeting in October, concluding with general secretary Williams announcing their decision to rescind Nair's suspension. The Singapore Free Press reported that SLP supporters in the South Ward – which Nair was contesting for – opposed Nair's candidacy in their ward along with the SLP's decision to retain him, but Williams believed that Nair would see support in the South Ward nonetheless. During the election, he contested for South Ward against the PP's Chan Kum Chee. In his campaign, Nair acknowledged the flooding problem in the area and pledged to work in the interests of labourers. In the results, Nair won South Ward with 1,871 votes, as compared to Chan's 974 votes. He was the only SLP candidate to win a seat that election, with his South Ward win being considered significant by The Straits Times as it was traditionally held by the PP for the past two elections.

== Municipal Commission (1950–1953) ==
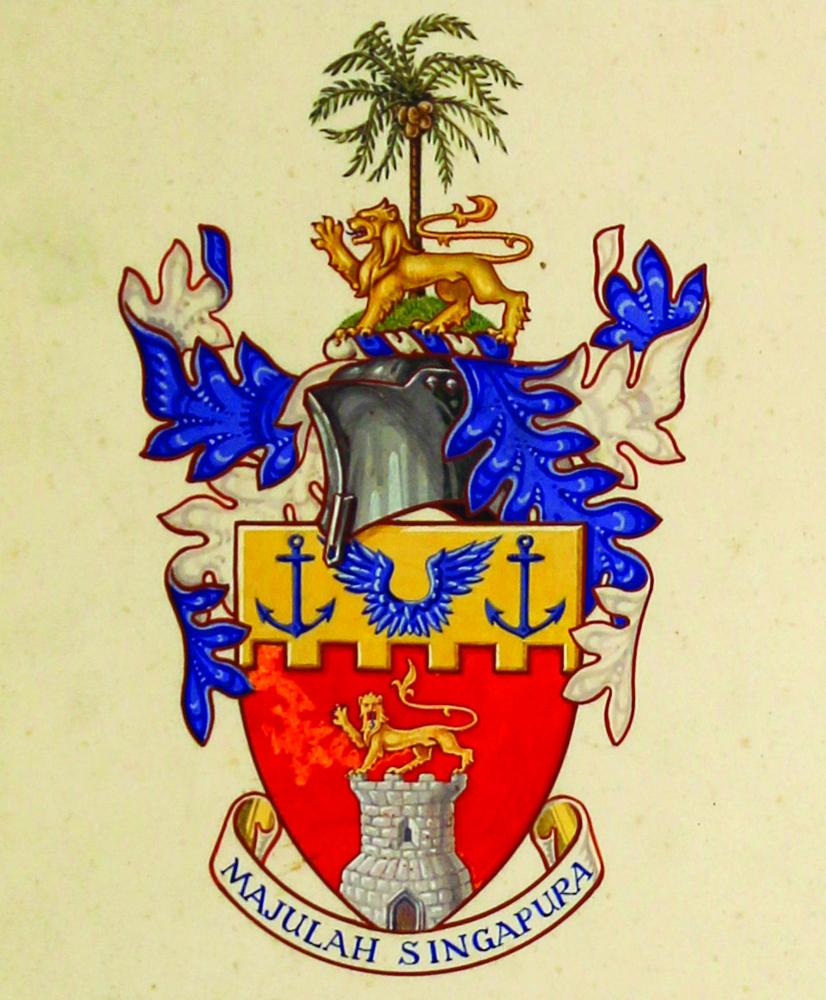
Coat of arms of the Municipal Commission

As a member of the Municipal Commission, Nair was made a member of its Public Utilities Committee and Service Committee in December 1950. One of his first motions was providing accommodation from the Singapore Improvement Trust (SIT) for employees of the military service, but the motion was postponed after commissioner Ess suggested hearing the SIT's position on it first. In February 1951, he was appointed to a committee by the commission to plan the creation of a Municipal Electricity Department. He also suggested an amendment to a motion introduced by commissioner Robertson, where Nair proposed nationalising the housing board and controlling private construction. However, his amendment did not see support and Robertson's original motion was passed. In March, Nair was elected the SLP's president.

In September, the Municipal Commission was renamed to the City Council, following Singapore being granted city status via royal charter. Municipal commissioners were subsequently known as city councillors. To celebrate the occasion, Nair was among several councillors who were a part of the City Day Celebrations Committee, and, alongside fellow councillor J. M. Jumabhoy, encouraged the Indian community to partake in such celebrations. In February 1952, he faced criticism from SLP legislative councillor C. R. Dasaratha Raj and SLP members V. P. Abdullah and A. D. Edward for comments he made supporting the UMNO–MCA alliance, which recently performed well at the 1952 Kuala Lumpur local elections. Abdullah stated that Nair encouraged Indians to support the UMNO–MCA alliance instead of the Selangor Labour Party or the Independence of Malaya Party. Raj attacked Nair and his statements as "[strengthening] the capitalists and others as opposed to Labour."

In March, Nair was expelled from the SLP for his statements about the UMNO–MCA alliance. It was revealed that, following their win, Nair had congratulated MCA chairman H. S. Lee in a letter. SLP general secretary Williams stated that the SLP considered the alliance "a coalition of capitalistic and feudalistic interests aimed at the destruction of the working class." Of his expulsion, Nair stated in the Singapore Standard that "[he] just couldn't care less" and promised to continue working in the interests on Singapore. In response to his expulsion, some members of the SLP found it to have been unfair, as Nair had not been given a chance to explain his position, along with a group of South Ward voters petitioning for the SLP to reinstate him.

However, in April, Nair said he still represented the SLP on the City Council because he had not been officially notified of his expulsion by the party leader. SLP leader E. V. Davies likewise considered Nair a member, as Davies had not been formally informed of the expulsion. In contrast, general secretary D. Stevens stated that Nair was no longer a member of the party. His expulsion was later officially approved by the new SLP general council that same month. Thus, Nair continued his term as an independent. In July, Nair was a part of a nine-member walkout that protested an amendment to the Labour Ordinance by councillor A. P. Rajah. In his amendment, Rajah stated that the council should be made up of 18 elected through elections, with six additional members elected amongst the councillors. It was criticised as beneficial for the ruling party, as it allowed them six more members to strengthen their majority. Rajah's motion was later passed.

In November, Nair announced his intentions to form a new political party called The Peoples' Congress, which would focus on attaining self-governance for Singapore, a merger of Singapore and the Federation of Malaya, and improving bilateral relations within Southeast Asia. He planned to form the party after the December City Council election. During the December election, he supported independent candidate S. Jaganathan for South Ward and accused SLP candidate Williams of going against the interests of the working class. He later met with councillors V. K. Nair, Lee Choon Eng, and Jaganathan to discuss forming a new labour party. In May 1953, Nair suggested a ban in smoking in theatres to the council's Health Committee; a prior suggestion of his banning smoking in buses saw support.

In August, he accused the Council of restricting information between councillors and department heads, as councillors could only ask for information on the permission of the council president, deputy president, or vice-chairman. Nair threatened to resign, but he was criticised by councillors Yap Pheng Geck and Rajah, who defended the system as being organised and orderly. Prior to the 1953 City Council election in December, Nair announced his candidacy for South Ward as an independent candidate; his term was due to expire at the end of that same year. However, on nomination day, thirty union leaders representing around 8,000 unionists called for him to both withdraw from the City Council election and resign from the Legislative Council, in retaliation for him ignoring their boycott of the Seletar by-election. Nair's name subsequently did not appear on the list of candidates for the election.

== Legislative Council (1952–1955) ==
Following the resignation of the legislative councillor for Seletar Constituency, Vilasini Menon, in September 1952, a by-election for Seletar was scheduled to be held in November. Nair announced his candidacy as an independent for the constituency in September, alongside independent M. P. Ramakrishnan. The PP and SLP were also expected to contest. However, later in November, Nair was the only candidate that submitted papers for the by-election, thereby winning in a walkover. This was the first time a candidate won in a walkover, and he also became the first person to serve on the Legislative Council and City Council concurrently.

However, Nair's candidacy drew controversy as the Naval Base Labour Union, representing around 10,000 workers, were boycotting the Seletar by-election and called for no candidacies in their constituency. Although other independent and party candidates respected their decision following talks with Union officials, Nair announced his candidacy regardless and was subsequently elected unopposed. He had previously tried to persuade them to stop their boycott. Nair was criticised for his decision to stand as he described himself a labour supporter, yet ignored the Naval Base Labour Union's boycott calls. After his unopposed victory, police officers were sent to Nair's home following threats to his life.

=== Councillor ===
In February 1953, he criticised the Singapore Rural Board for their lack of action after surveying the facilities of rural areas. He suggested establishing a Rural Development Authority that would function similarly to the Federation of Malaya's. Later in March, Nair supported the establishment of a police station in Tiong Bahru following an increase of crime in the area, however colonial secretary W. L. Blythe rejected the proposal as it would not significantly impact the crime management of Tiong Bahru. Blythe further said that the Tiong Bahru area was surrounded by four nearby police stations.

In June, Nair was awarded the commemorative Queen Elizabeth II Coronation Medal by Elizabeth II, which was instituted to celebrate her coronation. The following year, in February, he supported removing the nominated seats of the new Rendel Constitution – for the Legislative Assembly – describing them as "undemocratic". In May, Nair went on a three-week trip to the United Kingdom to study parliamentary procedure and election campaigning.

== Legislative Assembly (1955–1959) ==
In March 1955, he announced his candidacy for that year's general election for Seletar as an independent candidate. Nair contested against the Labour Front's (LF) Khew Pee Ging, the Democratic Party's Tan Leong Teck, and independent candidate Lek Poh Seng. He went on to win Seletar with 1,771 votes, out of 9,402 votes cast. Following his victory, Nair received an invitation from the LF to join their party, but he decided against immediately joining them and instead conferred with his constituents; he had identified himself as an "Independent-Labour" member of the Assembly. The LF – in an alliance with the Singapore United Malay National Organisation (SUMNO) and the Malayan Chinese Association (MCA) – became the ruling party after winning the most seats, with LF leader David Marshall serving as the first chief minister.

=== Assemblyman ===
Nair was sworn into the Legislative Assembly on 22 April 1955. In May, during the Chinese high school students' sit-ins in support of the Hock Lee bus rioters, Marshall appointed an All-Party Committee to investigate the Chinese students' issues, which included Nair. In July, the LF government proposed Nair as the local government, lands, and housing assistant minister to governor Sir Robin Black, who held the power to appoint new assistant ministers. However, this resulted in a constitutional crisis between Marshall and Black, following their disagreement on the Rendel Constitution.

The crisis ultimately culminated with the British interpreting the constitution in support of Marshall's view, however, twelve opposition members orchestrated a walk-out following a motion by Marshall in which he wanted to show appreciation towards Black and Secretary of State for the Colonies Alan Lennox-Boyd, as they disagreed against the updated constitution's vague wordings. This walk-out included Nair. As Marshall planned to appoint the new assistant ministers, Nair's nomination was met with protests by LF–alliance members, as he was not a member of the LF–alliance and they believed that party members should take precedence. They also brought up his involvement in the walk-out and threatened to resign should Nair be appointed. In September, Marshall announced that new ministers would be appointed, but that "it may not necessarily be these same men". Ultimately, the following month, Nair was not among those appointed.

In November, Nair voted in favour of the government in a motion of no confidence, which was supported 19 to 13. That same month, he was selected as the representative of the Singapore branch of the Commonwealth Parliamentary Association to visit Tasmania, following an invitation from the Tasmanian branch; he returned in January 1956. In March, the government agreed to appoint a committee to discuss Nair's proposed Hindu Marriage Bill, which would make the registration of Hindu marriages in Singapore compulsory.

==== Labour Front ====
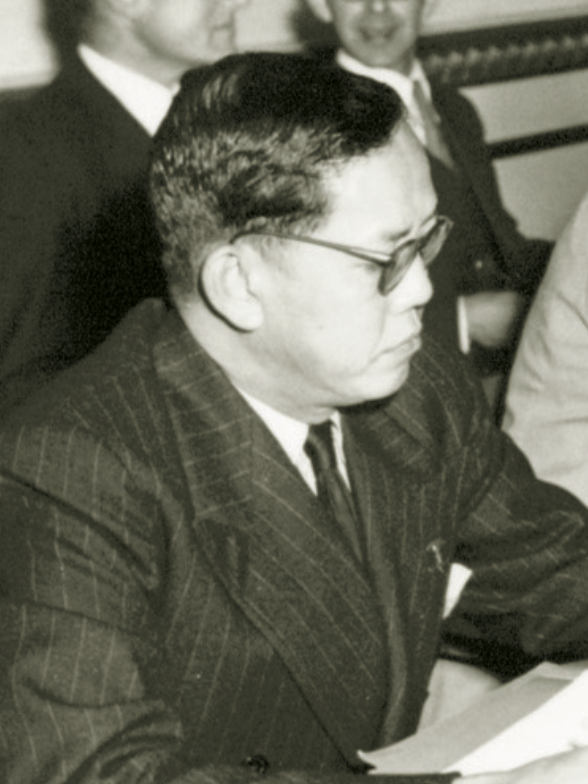
Nair served under chief minister Lim Yew Hock (pictured) in the LF and SPA governments

On 12 March 1956, Nair announced his affiliation with the LF–alliance government and joined the LF, stating that his constituents had "[felt] the time has come for [him] to join a political party". He crossed the floor and became an LF backbencher. In July, Nair was involved in ending a strike between the South Union Rubber Company and 210 of its workers regarding issues about the company's wage structure. On 15 October, Nair was appointed as an assistant minister to the Chief Secretary, William Goode, after being nominated by chief minister Lim Yew Hock. (Note: Marshall resigned as chief minister on 7 June and was succeeded by Lim.) In February 1957, he ran for vice president of the LF at their annual conference, but was elected a member of their central committee instead. The following month, he was a member of the All-Party Delegation that travelled to London for the Merdeka Talks.

In November, he took up Singaporean citizenship upon its implementation under the Singapore Citizenship Ordinance; he was the first person to register and receive a citizenship certificate. Nair subsequently introduced the Assembly Elections (Amendment) Bill, which aimed to allow only Singaporean citizens to participate and vote in elections. In April 1958, allegations of corruption against him were cleared after a committee of inquiry investigated a refrigerator he received five years prior as a gift. Nair announced in August that discussions between the government and commissioner of police A. E. G. Blades were ongoing on whether the Preservation of Public Security Ordinance could be invoked against secret society members.

==== Singapore People's Alliance ====
In November 1958, chief minister Lim announced the creation of a new political party: the Singapore People's Alliance (SPA). Nair was among those who joined the SPA and was a member of its central committee; the SPA's membership was largely made up of former LF, Liberal Socialist Party, and Workers' Party members. The SPA subsequently formed a new government in a coalition with the SUMNO–MCA alliance. The LF minister for communications and works, Francis Thomas, initially retained his post and remained with the LF, but resigned on 1 February 1959, after being asked to do so by Lim. Nair was announced as his successor and was sworn in on 3 February.

Later that month, Nair announced his candidacy at the upcoming general election for Jalan Kayu Constituency as an SPA candidate. In March, he stated that a bus service would be introduced in Queenstown, following petitions by its residents. Speaking on the idea of a merger between Singapore and Malaya, he believed it could only be achieved with the SPA as the ruling party and criticised the People's Action Party (PAP) for being a "barrier" towards an improved constitution. At the election, Nair contested against the PAP's Tan Cheng Tong. Tan was elected with 4,837 votes, while Nair only gained 2,929 votes. The Straits Times described this as "one of the few straight fights in the election".

== Post-ministership career and opposition work ==
Following his loss, he said he was "slightly disappointed", but "[left] with considerable satisfaction" having "done [his] best for the people [of] Jalan Kayu". In September, Nair travelled to the United Kingdom to study law. He was called to the bar in February 1963 at the Middle Temple in London. Nair returned to Singapore in April, where he was elected as a committee member in the SPA. He subsequently stood at that year's general election as a Singapore Alliance Party (Note: The Singapore Alliance Party was formed as an alliance between the SPA, the SUMNO, the MCA, and the Malayan Indian Congress in June 1961, following discussions by their leaders with Malayan prime minister Tunku Abdul Rahman. It was led by Lim.) candidate in Jalan Kayu, contesting against the PAP's Teo Hup Teck, Barisan Sosialis's (BS) Tan, (Note: Tan Cheng Tong was among dissidents that were expelled from the PAP, who later formed the Barisan Sosialis in 1961.) United People's Party's Pan Cheng Luan, and independent candidate Ong Yu Thoh. In the results, Nair finished third with 1,057 votes. He was admitted to the Singapore bar in October.

Nair made his political comeback at the 1966 by-election for Bukit Merah against the PAP's Lim Guan Hoo; he resigned from the SPA and stood as an independent. His slogan for the campaign was "Vote Opposition to Save Democracy". Nair also described himself as a "democratic socialist". Lim was elected with 7,214 votes as compared to Nair's 1,863. Upon his loss, he remarked that he was "somewhat disappointed" but "not [surprised]", and he called for the PAP to refrain from contesting the next by-elections to allow new opposition to enter parliament, claiming that the BS were "reluctant [...] to perform this role".

In 1967, he contested for Thomson as an independent at that year's by-elections, following the resignations of five BS parliamentarians. Nair went against the PAP's Ang Nam Piau and independent candidate Chan Yoke Kwong. During his campaign, he visited the houses of Thomson residents. In the results, Nair garnered the second highest-number of votes with 1,310, while Ang was elected with 9,407 votes; Nair had to forfeit his deposit. Upon his defeat, he warned of the risks of Singapore maintaining a one-party system. At the 1968 general election, he stood against the PAP's Lee Chiaw Meng for Farrer Park. Nair campaigned by visiting houses and complained that the government failed to announce the nomination and voting days of the election, despite parliament having already been dissolved. Nair lost with 1,391 votes to Lee's 7,826.

Whilst representing a client in 1970, he advocated for banning caning in Singapore, stating that it had been long abolished in India and the United Kingdom and "failed to serve its purportedly deterrent purpose". The judges disagreed with Nair and upheld their sentence of 10 years' imprisonment and 15 strokes of the cane on his client.

=== Workers' Party ===
At the 1972 general election, Nair joined the Workers' Party (WP) and contested for Jalan Kayu against the PAP's Hwang Soo Jin and the United National Front's Ong Seng Kok. New Nation wrote that Nair might find Hwang harder to beat as the opposition votes would be split with Ong. He placed second and lost to Hwang; that election, the PAP won every seat. At the next general election in 1976, Nair stood as the WP's candidate for Jalan Kayu against Hwang again. WP chairman Wong Hong Toy stated he was confident that they would win eight constituencies, with Jalan Kayu being one of them. New Nation stated that Nair may have an increased chance to win, due to his reputation in the area. Nair lost again with 5,544 votes to Hwang's 8,883.

Nair went against Hwang again at Jalan Kayu at the 1980 general election. He lost again, this time losing his deposit. Ahead of the 1984 general election, the Non-constituency Member of Parliament (NCMP) scheme was introduced to ensure that the opposition would always have seats in parliament. Opposition parties heavily criticised the scheme, with WP secretary-general J. B. Jeyaretnam describing it as creating "second-class MPs". At the election, Nair contested for Jalan Kayu again, this time against the PAP's Heng Chiang Meng; Hwang stepped down for personal reasons. Nair stated at a WP rally that the PAP's plans to create town councils were not new and existed previously in 1959. In the results, Nair narrowly lost to Heng with a margin of 571 votes.

With a percentage of 48.8%, the highest for a defeated candidate that election, Nair was offered a seat under the NCMP scheme. He told The Singapore Monitor that "it's not an individual decision" for him to make, and that he would consult with his party first. On 25 December, returning officer Ong Kok Min declared Nair as elected as a NCMP, despite discussions between Nair and Jeyaretnam still ongoing. Prior to the election, the WP stated that they would not allow their candidates to accept NCMP seats, however, Jeyaretnam stated that the party was rethinking their position. On 4 January 1985, the WP announced their rejection of the seat, with Jeyaretnam calling it "a pure sham" as "the [NCMP] do not represent the electors" and "have very little power or hardly any power at all". (Note: The seat was then offered to the Singapore United Front's Tan Chee Kien, who similarly rejected it. The NCMP seat remained vacant as Tan's rejection was considered a resignation.) Nair retired from politics sometime prior to the 1988 general election, due to his age.

== Personal life and death ==
In September 1956, he became engaged with Sushila Nair, the eldest daughter of city councillor V. K. Nair. Their wedding was held on 12 January 1957 at the Chettiar Temple on Tank Road. They had three children together. He died on 15 January 1989 from a heart attack, aged 69. A funeral service was held at Mount Vernon Columbarium for him.
