= Joan Hon =

Singaporean writer (b. 1943)

- Born: 1943 (age 82–83); Balik Pulau, George Town, Penang, Malaysia
- Occupations: Writer and educator
- Writing career
- Language: English

Joan Hon (born 1943) is a Singaporean writer and former educator. She is best known as the author of Star Sapphire, possibly Singapore's first science fiction novel, which she published in 1985 under the pseudonym Han May.

== Early life and career ==
Hon was born into a Hakka family in Balik Pulau, a suburb of George Town, Penang. Her father was Hon Sui Sen, who would later become a politician, serving as the Minister of Finance from 1970 to 1983. When she was four years old, her family moved to Singapore, where they briefly stayed at 38 Oxley Road, the house of future Singaporean Prime Minister Lee Kuan Yew.

In 1965, Hon gained a BSc in Physics at the National University of Singapore. After gaining her diploma in education, she became a teacher at St. Joseph's Institution. Hon went on to write physics textbooks for the Curriculum Development Institute of Singapore.

== Literary career ==
In 1982, while sick in bed and under the influence of medication, Hon was inspired to write the novel Star Sapphire. She completed the first draft in eight months. The work has been recognised as arguably Singapore's first science fiction novel.

Star Sapphire tells the tale of a young scientist, Yva Yolan, who takes a job aboard an interstellar spaceship called the Star Sapphire, and finds herself entangled in a love triangle between two crew members. This was eventually published in 1985 under the pseudonym Han May, with "Han" being the Mandarin Chinese pronunciation of her surname and "May" being a contraction of the name of Mary, mother of Jesus, to whom she dedicated her writing. The work was praised as a "stellar maiden effort", with her protagonist described as a "sensitive, fetching character."

Following the death of her father Hon Sui Sen in 1983, she wrote his biography, Relatively Speaking. This was published in 1984, a year before Star Sapphire. Hon regarded the work as "a mere chronicling of facts", not a true work of creative writing.

In 1986, the National Book Development Council of Singapore awarded Relatively Speaking with a Commendation in the category of non-fiction and Star Sapphire with a High Commendation in the category of fiction.

Hon has authored non-fiction works about historical events and developments in Singapore. Among these, Tidal Fortunes: A Story of Change: The Singapore River and Kallang Basin was awarded a High Commendation by the National Book Development Council of Singapore in 1992. Additionally, she has published accounts of her Catholic pilgrimage to the village of Medjugorje.

== Bibliography ==
=== Novel ===
- Han May (1985). Star Sapphire. ISBN 978-9971-65-174-9.

=== Non-fiction ===
- Relatively Speaking. Singapore: Times Books International. 1984. ISBN 978-9971-65-152-7.
- Hotel New World Collapse. Singapore: Times Books International. 1987. ISBN 978-9971-65-411-5.
- 100 Years of the Singapore Fire Service. Singapore: Produced & published for Singapore Fire Service by Times Books International. 1988. ISBN 9971-65-513-6.
- A trip to Medjugorje : pilgrims tell of their visits to our Lady Queen of Peace. Singapore: Hope Publishers. 1989. ISBN 9789810008352. OCLC 224529721.
- Tidal Fortunes. Singapore: Landmark Books. 1990. ISBN 978-981-3002-32-6.
- The Medjugorje experience : stories of healing and inspiration. Singapore: Hope Publishers. 1992. ISBN 9789810032937. OCLC 224530202.
