= Wong Lin Ken =

Singaporean politician and historian (1931–1983)

- 黄麟根

Ambassador of Singapore to the United States
- In office 7 April 1967 – December 1968
- President: Yusof Ishak
- Prime Minister: Lee Kuan Yew
- Preceded by: Position established
- Succeeded by: Ernest Steven Monteiro

Minister for Home Affairs
- In office 6 September 1970 – 15 September 1972
- Prime Minister: Lee Kuan Yew
- Preceded by: Ong Pang Boon
- Succeeded by: E. W. Barker

Member of Parliament representing Alexandra Constituency
- In office 6 May 1968 – 6 December 1976
- Preceded by: Constituency established
- Succeeded by: Tan Soo Khoon (PAP)
- Majority: 1968: N/A (walkover); 1972: 14,183 (61.20%)

Personal details
- Born: Wong Lin Ken; 1931 Penang, Straits Settlements
- Died: 16 February 1983 (aged 51) Singapore
- Party: People's Action Party
- Spouse: Lilli Wong
- Children: 3
- Education: University of Malaya; University of London

Wong Lin Ken (Note: Chinese: 黄麟根; pinyin: Huáng Língēn) (1931 – 16 February 1983) was a Singaporean politician and historian. He served as the first Ambassador of Singapore to the United States. A member of the People's Action Party (PAP), Wong also served as the Minister for Home Affairs from 1970 to 1972 and the Member of Parliament (MP) representing Alexandra Constituency from 1968 to 1976.

== Early life ==
Wong Lin Ken was born in 1931 in Penang, which was then a part of the Straits Settlements. He attended St. George's Boys School in Balik Pulau and Penang Free School. He later won a Government Bursary to study at the University of Malaya and a Queen's Scholar to study at the University of London. In 1959, he got a doctorate in history.

In 1953, Wong went on an expedition trip led by G. de G. Sieveking, including Emily Sadka, where they found masonry in Malay fortifications and the remains of an ancient Chinese trading ship.

== Academic career ==
Wong worked as a senior lecturer in history at the University of Singapore and was also the chairman of the Adult Education Board. He briefly left the university from 1967 to 1968 when he was appointed as the Ambassador of Singapore to the United States and returned to the university after the stint.

== Political career ==
Wong made his political debut in 1964 at the 1964 Malaysian general election where he contested for Bukit Bintang as a People's Action Party (PAP) candidate against Tan Toh Hong of Alliance Party, Ishak Muhamad of Socialist Front, and Abdul Aziz Ismail of Malaysian Islamic Party. He lost with 31.12% of the vote.

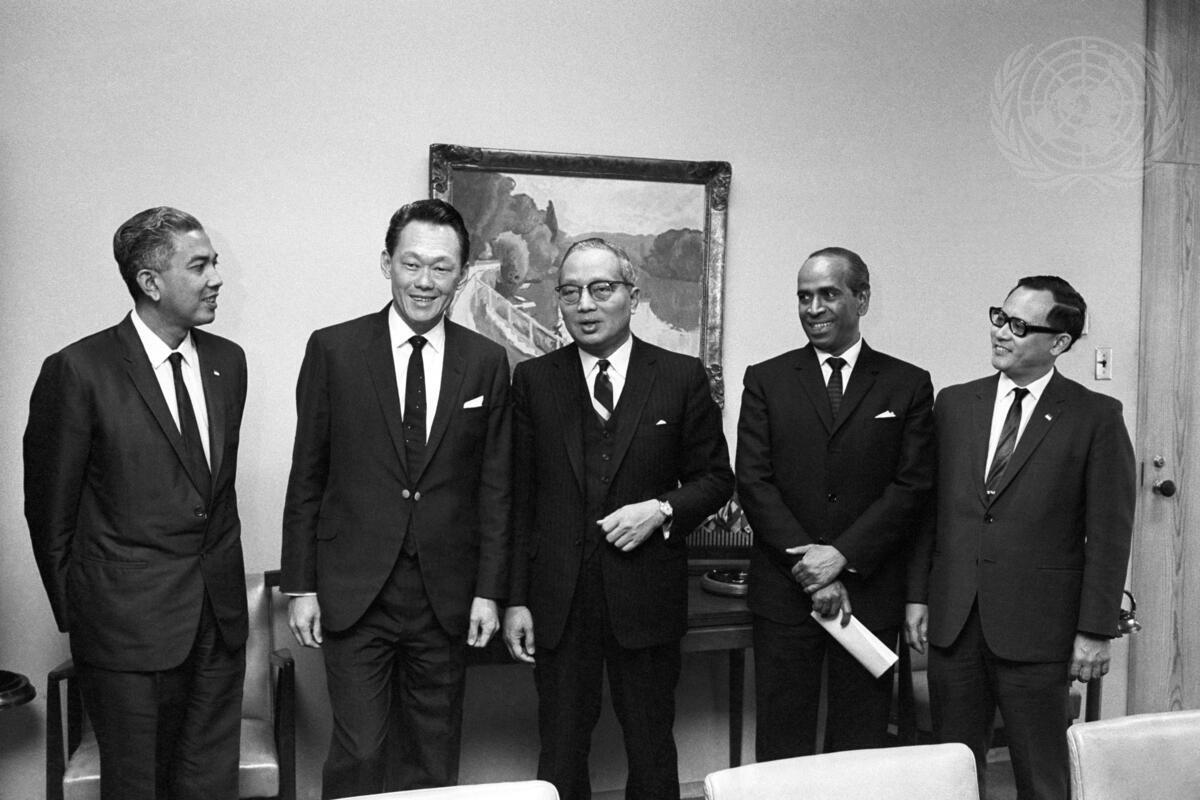
Prime Minister of Singapore Visits UN Headquarters on 1967-10-21: Seen here, from left: Inche Rahim Ishak (Abdul Rahim Ishak), Minister of State for Education of Singapore; Prime Minister Lee Kuan Yew; Secretary-General U Thant; S. Rajaratnam, Minister of Foreign Affairs of Singapore; and Ambassador Wong Lin Ken, Permanent Representative of Singapore to the United Nations.

In 1967, Wong was appointed the first Ambassador of Singapore to the United States which ended in 1968.

During the 1968 general election, Wong contested for Member of Parliament (MP) of Alexandra Constituency and was elected unopposed. In 1970, Wong was appointed the Minister for Home Affairs (MHA). In 1971, Wong announced the formation of the Central Narcotics Bureau, a department under the MHA, to combat drug trafficking and distribution and is responsible for coordinating all matters pertaining to drug eradication in Singapore.

In the 1972 general election, Wong contested for MP of Alexandra Constituency again, against Wong Kui Yu from Workers' Party and S. A. Hamid from United National Front. He was elected with 77.52% of the vote.

Wong was also the director of the External Affairs Bureau of the People's Action Party.

He was part of a five-man delegation led by Minister for Interior and Defense Goh Keng Swee that attended the 1966 U.N. General Assembly.

== Death ==
On 16 February 1983, Wong committed suicide by hanging using a nylon cord in his bathroom after having heard a loud noise from his neighbour's house. According to his wife, Lilli Wong, and his psychiatrist, Ho Eng Siong, he had been suffering from depression and entered a panicked reaction after the sudden loud noise. He was cremated at Mount Vernon Columbarium and was survived by his wife and three children.

== Notes ==
Parliament of Singapore
New constituency	Member of Parliament for Alexandra Constituency; 1968–1976	Succeeded by Tan Soo Khoon
