= Hwang Soo Jin =

Singaporean former politician (born 1937)

- 黄树人

Member of Parliament representing Jalan Kayu Constituency
- In office 6 May 1968 – 4 December 1984
- Preceded by: Teo Hup Teck
- Succeeded by: Heng Chiang Meng

Deputy Speaker of the Parliament of Singapore
- In office 6 March 1981 – 3 December 1984
- Preceded by: Tang See Chim
- Succeeded by: Tan Soo Khoon

Personal details
- Born: Hwang Soo Jin; 1937 (age 88–89) China

Hwang Soo Jin (Note: Chinese: 黄树人; Pe̍h-ōe-jī: N̂g Sū-jîn; pinyin: Huáng Shùrén) (born 1937) is a Singaporean former politician and insurer. A former member of the People's Action Party (PAP), he served as the Member of Parliament (MP) representing Jalan Kayu Constituency from 1968 to 1984 and the Deputy Speaker of Parliament from 1981 to 1984.

== Early life ==
Hwang Soo Jin was born in 1937 in China before moving to Singapore when he was three. The second son to P. K. Hwang, an insurer, he attended Chung Cheng High School and later studied in London in 1954 for 3 years. He later returned and worked at Commercial Union's Malayan organisation.

In 1959, he became an associate at the Chartered Insurance Institute and was in-charge of the Marine Department. Before joining politics, Hwang was an assistant manager of an insurance company and was a member of the Public Service in the disciplinary panel.

== Career ==
=== Political career ===
Hwang made his political debut at the 1968 general election, contesting for Member of Parliament (MP) for Jalan Kayu Constituency against Sum Chong Meng of Workers' Party (WP). Hwang was elected with 82.30% of the vote. At the 1972 general election, he contested for MP of Jalan Kayu Constituency again, against Madai Puthan Damodaran Nair of WP and Ong Seng Kok of United National Front. He was elected with 59.42% of the vote.

In the 1976 general election, Hwang contested for MP of Jalan Kayu Constituency again, against Madai Puthan Damodaran Nair of WP again, being elected with 61.57% of the vote. In the following election, he contested for MP of Jalan Kayu Constituency again, against Madai Puthan Damodaran Nair again, being elected with 69.02% of the vote. In 1981, Hwang became the Deputy Speaker of Parliament till 1984. He retired from politics in 1984 for personal reasons.

=== Insurer career ===
In 1980, Hwang was elected the president of the General Insurance Association of Singapore. In 1982, United Overseas Bank set up an insurance subsidiary in Hong Kong with Hwang and Wee Cho Yaw serving as directors, both of them having previously served as directors at United Overseas Insurance. In 1988, Hwang resigned as director of United Overseas Finance.

In the 1990s, Hwang served as the chairman of Singapore Reinsurance. In 2001, Hwang donated S$100,000 to the Asian Civilisations Museum, the largest donation from a private individual. In 2015, Hwang served as a non-executive director at Singapore Reinsurance.
