= Vilasini Menon =

Singaporean lawyer and politician

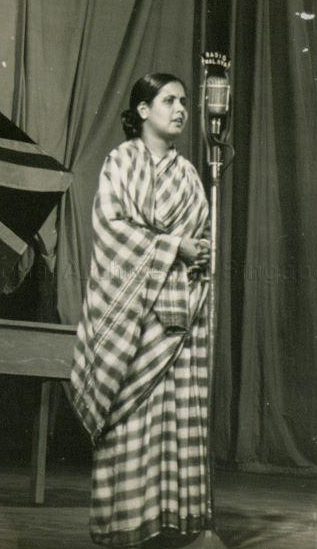
- Menon in 1951

Member of the Legislative Council
- In office 1951–1952
- Succeeded by: M. P. D. Nair
- Constituency: Seletar

Vilasini Menon was a Singaporean lawyer and politician. She became the first woman elected to national office in Singapore when she was elected to the Legislative Council in 1951.

== Biography ==
Born around 1921, Menon attended the University of Madras and worked as a lawyer.

In the April 1951 elections she contested the Seletar constituency as an independent candidate, defeating two men to win with 43% of the vote. She was the only independent candidate to be elected the council, and was one of two female members alongside Elizabeth Choy, who was nominated by the Governor.

However, after Menon and her husband were charged with a criminal breach of trust in India, she resigned from the council on 25 September 1952. Although she was acquitted in February the following year, she did not return to politics.
