= Havelock Constituency =

Former electoral division in Singapore

Havelock
- Former Single Member constituency for the Parliament of Singapore
- Region: Havelock

Former constituency
- Created: 1955
- Abolished: 1984
- Seats: 1
- Member: constituency abolished

Havelock Constituency was a constituency in Singapore. It used to exist from 1955 to 1984.

== History ==
In 1963, Loh Miaw Gong was elected as assemblyman for the Legislative Assembly of Singapore. However she was arrested under the Internal Security Act before she can assume her seat.

In 1967, Loh resigned her seat, along with four other Barisan Sosialis MP. A by-election was called in 1967 to fill in the seat.

In 1984, Havelock was merged with nearby constituencies, Telok Ayer and Kreta Ayer Constituencies.

Hon died of a heart attack on 14 October 1983 while still in office as Finance Minister and MP for the constituency. No by-election was called.

== Member of Parliament ==
Election	Member of Parliament	Party
Legislative Assembly of Singapore
1955	Lim Yew Hock	LF
1959	Peter Lau Por Tuck	PAP
1963	Loh Miaw Gong	BS
Parliament of Singapore
1967	Lim Soo Peng	PAP
1968	Lim Soo Peng	PAP
1970	Hon Sui Sen	PAP
1972	Hon Sui Sen	PAP
1976	Hon Sui Sen	PAP
1980	Hon Sui Sen	PAP

== Electoral results ==
Note: The Elections Department does not include rejected votes when calculating the vote shares of candidates. Hence, all candidates' vote shares will total to 100% at any given election (may not appear so in multi-way contests due to rounding).

=== Elections in 1950s ===
General Election 1955: Havelock
Party	Candidate	Votes	%	±%
LF	Lim Yew Hock	5,744	86.5	N/A
Independent	Soh C.S.	525	7.9	N/A
PP	Chua Bock Kwee	373	5.6	N/A
Majority		5,219	78.6	N/A
Registered electors		12,835		N/A
Total valid votes		6,642	51.7	N/A
Rejected ballots				
Turnout				
LF win (new seat)				

General Election 1959: Havelock
Party	Candidate	Votes	%	±%
PAP	Peter Lau Por Tuck	9,227	63.6	N/A
Independent	Ng See Thong	3,562	24.6	N/A
SPA	Tan Theng Chiang	963	6.6	N/A
MCA	Loke Kwok Sang	433	3.0	N/A
LSP	Tan Ah Pak	323	2.2	N/A
Majority		5,665	39.0	▼39.6
Registered electors		15,919		▲24.0
Total valid votes		14,508	91.1	▲39.4
Rejected ballots				
Turnout				
PAP gain from SPA		Swing	N/A	

=== Elections in 1960s ===
General Election 1963: Havelock
Party	Candidate	Votes	%	±%
BS	Loh Miaw Gong	6,304	44.1	N/A
PAP	Wong Chun Choi	4,157	29.0	▼34.6
UPP	Ng Chee Sen	3,209	22.4	N/A
SA	Lim Ser Puan	641	4.5	▼5.1
Majority		2,147	15.1	▼23.9
Registered electors		15,159		▼4.8
Total valid votes		14,311	94.4	▼1.4
Rejected ballots				
Turnout				
BS gain from PAP		Swing	N/A	

== Historical maps ==
1955 General Election
