= Alexandra Constituency =

Former electoral division in Singapore

Alexandra
- Former Single Member constituency for the Parliament of Singapore
- Region: Singapore

Former constituency
- Created: 1968
- Abolished: 1988
- Seats: 1
- Replaced by: Brickworks GRC

Alexandra Constituency was a constituency in Singapore. It used to exist from 1968 to 1988 and was merged into Brickworks Group Representation Constituency (GRC).

== History ==
In 1988, the constituency was merged into Brickworks GRC following the establishment of Group representation constituency (GRC) and Single Member Constituency (SMC).

== Member of Parliament ==
Year	Member	Party
Formation
1968	Wong Lin Ken	PAP
1972	Wong Lin Ken	PAP
1976	Tan Soo Khoon	PAP
1980	Tan Soo Khoon	PAP
1984	Tan Soo Khoon	PAP
Constituency abolished (1988)

== Electoral results ==
Note: The Elections Department does not include rejected votes when calculating the vote shares of candidates. Hence, all candidates' vote shares will total to 100% at any given election (may not appear so in multi-way contests due to rounding).

=== Elections in the 1960s ===
General Election 1968
Party	Candidate	Votes	%
PAP	Wong Lin Ken	Unopposed	
Registered electors		13,317	
PAP win (new seat)			

=== Elections in the 1970s ===
General Election 1972
Party	Candidate	Votes	%	±%
PAP	Wong Lin Ken	17,965	77.52	N/A
WP	Wong Kui Yu	3,782	16.32	N/A
UNF	S. A. Hamid	1,427	6.16	N/A
Majority		14,183	61.20	N/A
Total valid votes		23,174	98.83	N/A
Rejected ballots		272	4.30	N/A
Turnout		23,446	95.70	N/A
Registered electors		24,499		▲83.97
PAP hold				

General Election 1976
Party	Candidate	Votes	%	±%
PAP	Tan Soo Khoon	12,413	75.90	▼1.62
WP	Chua Boon Eng Edward	3,941	24.10	▲7.78
Majority		8,472	51.80	▼9.40
Total valid votes		16,354	98.45	▼0.38
Rejected ballots		257	1.55	▲0.38
Turnout		16,611	95.65	▼0.05
Registered electors		17,367		▼29.11
PAP hold		Swing	▼1.62	

=== Elections in the 1980s ===
General Election 1980
Party	Candidate	Votes	%	±%
PAP	Tan Soo Khoon	Unopposed		
Registered electors		18,163		▲4.58
PAP hold				

General Election 1984
Party	Candidate	Votes	%	±%
PAP	Tan Soo Khoon	12,172	66.79	N/A
WP	J C Corera	6,053	33.21	N/A
Majority		6,119	33.58	N/A
Total valid votes		18,225	97.79	N/A
Rejected ballots		411	2.21	N/A
Turnout		18,636	94.74	N/A
Registered electors		19,670		▲8.30
PAP hold				
