= Jurong Single Member Constituency =

Parliamentary constituency in Singapore

Jurong Single Member Constituency, prior to 1988 known simply as the Jurong Constituency, was a single member constituency (SMC) in the western area in Singapore mainly in Jurong and Tuas area. It had existed since the 1959 general elections by carving a portion from Bukit Timah Constituency.

== History ==
In early October 1966, Chia Thye Poh boycotted Parliament over the ruling People's Action Party (PAP) decision to split from Malaysia. This action was part of BS' strategy to protest what it viewed as "undemocratic acts" by carrying the struggle beyond Parliament. On 7 October, Chia resigned from his seat in the Parliament.

A by-elections was held on 2 November 1966 where Ho Kah Leong of the PAP won uncontested.

In 1976, part of the constituency was carved out to form Boon Lay Constituency.

In 1988, following the establishment of Group representation constituency (GRC) and SMC, it was known as Jurong SMC.

In 1997, the constituency was absorbed into Bukit Timah Group Representation Constituency.

== Member of Parliament ==
| Year | Member of Parliament | Party |
Legislative Assembly of Singapore
| 1959 | Chor Yeok Eng | PAP |
| 1963 | Chia Thye Poh | BS |
Parliament of Singapore
| 1965 | Chia Thye Poh | BS |
| 1966 | Ho Kah Leong | PAP |
| 1968 | Ho Kah Leong | PAP |
| 1972 | Ho Kah Leong | PAP |
| 1976 | Ho Kah Leong | PAP |
| 1980 | Ho Kah Leong | PAP |
| 1984 | Ho Kah Leong | PAP |
| 1988 | Ho Kah Leong | PAP |
| 1991 | Ho Kah Leong | PAP |

== Electoral results ==
Note: The Elections Department does not include rejected votes when calculating the vote shares of candidates. Hence, all candidates' vote shares will total to 100% at any given election (may not appear so in multi-way contests due to rounding).

=== Elections in 1950s ===
General Election 1959
| Party | Candidate | Votes | % | ±% |
|---|---|---|---|---|
| PAP | Chor Yeok Eng | 4,502 | 70.67 | |
| SPA | Wong Tuck Leong | 1,325 | 20.80 | |
| LSP | Chia Yeck Poh | 375 | 5.89 | |
| Malay Union | Ahman bin Haji Subri | 168 | 2.64 | |
| Turnout | | 6,476 | 90.2 | |
| PAP win (new seat) | | | | |

Note: In 1957, Singapore Malay Union (SMU) was expelled by its alliance partners consisted of UMNO and MCA for fielding a candidate in that by-election which was the reason for the elections department of Singapore to view Ahman bin Haji Subri as an independent candidate.

General Election 1963
| Party | Candidate | Votes | % | ±% |
|---|---|---|---|---|
| BS | Chia Thye Poh | 3,973 | 55.85 | +55.85 |
| PAP | Ong Soo Chuan | 2,268 | 31.89 | −38.78 |
| UPP | Soh U Loh | 501 | 7.04 | +7.04 |
| SA | Wong Tuck Leong | 371 | 5.22 | +5.22 |
| Turnout | | 6,476 | 94.7 | +4.5 |
| BS gain from PAP | | Swing | -38.78 | |

By-election 2 November 1966
| Party | Candidate | Votes | % | ±% |
|---|---|---|---|---|
| PAP | Ho Kah Leong | Walkover | | |
| Turnout | | 8,757 | | N/A |
| PAP gain from BS | | Swing | | |

=== Elections in 1960s ===
General Election 1968
| Party | Candidate | Votes | % | ±% |
|---|---|---|---|---|
| PAP | Ho Kah Leong | Walkover | | |
| Turnout | | 11,445 | | N/A |
| PAP hold | | Swing | | |

=== Elections in 1970s ===
General Election 1972
| Party | Candidate | Votes | % | ±% |
|---|---|---|---|---|
| PAP | Ho Kah Leong | 10,741 | 76.43 | |
| United National Front | Ng Soon Hee | 3,312 | 23.57 | |
| Turnout | | 14,537 | 94.7 | N/A |
| PAP hold | | Swing | | |

General Election 1976
| Party | Candidate | Votes | % | ±% |
|---|---|---|---|---|
| PAP | Ho Kah Leong | Walkover | | |
| Turnout | | 18,310 | | N/A |
| PAP hold | | Swing | | |

=== Elections in 1980s ===
General Election 1980
| Party | Candidate | Votes | % | ±% |
|---|---|---|---|---|
| PAP | Ho Kah Leong | Walkover | | |
| Turnout | | 18,658 | | N/A |
| PAP hold | | Swing | | |

General Election 1984
| Party | Candidate | Votes | % | ±% |
|---|---|---|---|---|
| PAP | Ho Kah Leong | Walkover | | |
| Turnout | | 24,517 | | N/A |
| PAP hold | | Swing | | |

General Election 1988
| Party | Candidate | Votes | % | ±% |
|---|---|---|---|---|
| PAP | Ho Kah Leong | 14,769 | 75.17 | |
| PKMS | Mohamed Awang | 4,879 | 24.83 | |
| Turnout | | 20,091 | 93.8 | N/A |
| PAP hold | | Swing | | |

=== Elections in 1990s ===
General Election 1991
| Party | Candidate | Votes | % | ±% |
|---|---|---|---|---|
| PAP | Ho Kah Leong | 18,843 | 64.32 | −10.85 |
| WP | John Gan Eng Guan | 8,965 | 30.60 | +30.60 |
| PKMS | Mohamed Awang | 1,489 | 5.08 | −19.75 |
| Turnout | | 30,040 | 96.1 | +2.3 |
| PAP hold | | Swing | -10.85 | |

== See also ==
- Jurong GRC
