= Teh Cheang Wan =

Singaporean politician (1928–1986)

- 郑章远

Minister for National Development
- In office 1 February 1979 – 14 December 1986
- Prime Minister: Lee Kuan Yew
- Preceded by: Lim Kim San
- Succeeded by: S. Dhanabalan

Member of Parliament for Geylang West
- In office 31 January 1979 – 14 December 1986
- Preceded by: Yong Nyuk Lin
- Succeeded by: Peh Chin Hua

Personal details
- Born: Teh Cheang Wan; 3 March 1928 China
- Died: 14 December 1986 (aged 58) Singapore
- Cause of death: Suicide
- Party: People's Action Party (1979–1986)
- Spouse: Luna Teh
- Children: 2
- Education: University of Sydney

Teh Cheang Wan (Note: Chinese: 郑章远; Pe̍h-ōe-jī: Tēⁿ Chiang-oán; pinyin: Zhèng Zhāngyuǎn) (3 March 1928 – 14 December 1986) was a Singaporean politician and architect who served as Minister for National Development between 1979 and 1986. A member of the governing People's Action Party (PAP), he was the Member of Parliament (MP) for Geylang West Constituency between 1979 and 1986.

In November 1986, Teh was investigated by the Corrupt Practices Investigation Bureau (CPIB) for alleged corruption. Teh died by suicide on 14 December 1986 before he could be charged in court.

== Early life and career ==
Teh was educated at Lai Teck School and Chung Ling High School, Penang. He graduated from the University of Sydney in 1956, majoring in architecture.

Teh started his career as an architect at New South Wales Public Works. He subsequently moved to the Housing Commission in New South Wales before expanding his expertise with the Housing Trust in Kuala Lumpur and serving in the Penang City Council.

In August 1959, Teh joined the Singapore Improvement Trust as an architect. He was promoted to Chief Architect, Building Department of the newly formed Housing and Development Board (HDB) in October 1959. He later became the chief executive officer of HDB from 1970 to 1979. He was also the chairman of Jurong Town Corporation (JTC) from 1976 to 1979. He resigned from his posts to enter into politics.

Teh was elected as the Member of Parliament (MP) for Geylang West Constituency in January 1979, and held the seat until his death in December 1986. He was appointed Minister for National Development on 1 February 1979.

As Minister for National Development, Teh proposed a ban on chewing gum in 1983 in light of public cleanliness issues. Prime Minister Lee Kuan Yew rejected the idea as being too drastic, but nine years after Teh's initial proposal, a chewing gum ban was passed into law.

== Corruption allegations ==
Teh was investigated for corruption by the Corrupt Practices Investigation Bureau (CPIB) for accepting two bribes of $400,000 each in 1981 and 1982. As Minister for National Development, Teh had allegedly accepted bribes totaling $1 million from 2 private companies for helping them retain and buy over a piece of state land for private development.

In November 1986, Prime Minister Lee Kuan Yew approved an open investigation on his alleged corruption; the papers were issued to the Attorney-General on 11 December. Although Teh maintained his innocence, he committed suicide on 14 December, before he could be charged. As a result of the suicide, the Attorney-General could not proceed with the charges.

On 26 January 1987, Lee Kuan Yew delivered a parliamentary speech by reading out the suicide note addressed to him, written by Teh. He then revealed for the first time that Teh was being investigated for accepting bribes.

== Suicide ==
Teh was found dead in his room by his wife at around 8 am of 14 December 1986. At 9.10 am, Lee Kuan Yew received a note from his security officer containing Teh's suicide note. In the note, Teh wrote:

Prime Minister

I have been feeling very sad and depressed for the last two weeks.

I feel responsible for the occurrence of this unfortunate incident and I feel I should accept full responsibility. As an honourable oriental gentleman I feel it is only right that I should pay the highest penalty for my mistake.

Yours faithfully

Sgd Teh Cheang Wan

After receiving the letter, Lee called Teh's family, asking if a doctor had been there to certify his death, and was informed that Teh's personal physician Charles Toh had been called. According to Lee, the family expressed a wish for Teh's body to be cremated without any delay from autopsy. Lee asked his cabinet secretary Wong Chooi Sen and Deputy Prime Minister Goh Chok Tong to visit Teh's family, and to call him once Dr Toh had examined the death. At 10.20 am, Dr Toh pronounced Teh's death and could not certify that Teh's death was by natural causes. Lee visited the family shortly after the examination, at about 11 am. By the evening, the body had been sent for autopsy, and Lee was informed by the Permanent Secretary for Health that Teh had died of an overdose of amytal barbiturate. On 20 January 1987, the State Coroner returned a verdict of suicide due to an overdose of amytal barbiturate.

Lee Kuan Yew responded with a condolence letter after ascertaining the cause of his death with Ministry of Health, recognising his role in helping modernise the construction industry, speed up the building of expressways, and lessen traffic jams. Lee stressed that "there is no way a Minister can avoid investigations, and a trial if there is evidence to support one."

However, there was a subsequent investigation into the matter due to concerns by opposition MP Chiam See Tong. In December 1987, the findings of the Commission of Inquiry were presented to the President of Singapore, however, they were not released to the public until the end the year. The entire probe lasted 31 months.

=== Alleged cover-up ===
In 1987, Lee Kuan Yew sued a Malaysian newspaper after it alleged that Lee had persuaded Teh to kill himself to cover up a larger corruption scandal involving Brunei and that Lee had personally given Teh the drugs necessary for his suicide.

In 1988, Joshua Benjamin Jeyaretnam, formerly the leader of the opposition, argued in public rallies that Lee Kuan Yew had advised or assisted in Teh's suicide. Lee later sued Jeyaretnam, winning $260,000 in damages. By 1998, Jeyaretnam had returned to Parliament as a non-constituency member and asked how Teh had procured the barbiturate and whether the police had checked suppliers of the drug in Singapore. In response, Home Affairs Minister Wong Kan Seng stated that the police had interviewed Teh's personal physicians, pharmacist, and family members, all of whom had no knowledge of how Teh obtained the drug. Wong also noted that the Ministry of Health had stopped using the drug a year prior to Teh's death. Upon further questioning, Wong said:

[T]his drug could be obtained anywhere in the world. It could have been obtained from outside Singapore. And if the Police were to be led, as Mr Jeyaretnam suggests, on a wild goose chase in checking all the drugstores, then it is really a waste of Police resources... I am really puzzled by the sudden interest of Mr Jeyaretnam on this subject of how Mr Teh Cheang Wan got his drug more than 11 years ago. The Police had done all they could to determine how he got the drug by asking his doctors, his pharmacist and the people whom he could have obtained the drugs from. Unless the Member is able to give us some lead as to where the late Mr Teh got his drug, I am afraid that we will be on a wild goose chase...
I do not know why Mr Jeyaretnam is interested in this question. I think nobody, other than the person who gave Mr Teh that drug or Mr Teh himself, would know where the drug came from. And even if that person who gave him the drug were to own up and say, "I am the one who gave", I do not think that can be corroborated because Mr Teh is already dead. So the only person who can really tell where Mr Teh got his drug from is Mr Teh. Maybe for those who are really interested in finding out where he got his drug from, I think that can be done one day when we leave this world. And if their path crosses that of Mr Teh Cheang Wan, ask him the question. Then their curiosity will be satisfied.

== Honours ==
=== National honours ===
- Singapore: Pingat Jasa Gemilang (1976)

== See also ==
- List of members of the Singapore Parliament who died in office
