= Ariff Suradi =

Singaporean politician (1929–2014)

- عارف سورادي

Member of the Singapore Parliament for Kampong Kembangan Constituency
- In office 21 September 1963 – 23 December 1976
- Preceded by: Ali Alwi (UMNO)
- Succeeded by: Mansor Sukaimi

Member of the Singapore Parliament for Ulu Pandan Constituency
- In office 20 May 1959 – 21 September 1963
- Preceded by: Constituency established
- Succeeded by: Chow Chiok Hock

Personal details
- Born: Mohamed Ariff bin Suradi; 22 May 1929 Singapore, Straits Settlements
- Died: 25 February 2014 (aged 84) Singapore
- Party: People's Action Party
- Education: Victoria School
- Occupation: Politician

Mohamed Ariff bin Suradi (Note: Jawi: عارف بن سورادي) (22 May 1929 – 25 February 2014) was a Singaporean politician who represented Ulu Pandan from 1959 to 1963 and Kampong Kembangan from 1963 to 1976. He was a member of the People's Action Party.

Ariff died on 25 February 2014 at the age of 84.

== Education ==
Ariff attended Victoria School.
