= Lim Soo Peng =

Singaporean politician and businessman (1928 – 2026)

Lim Soo Peng JP, BBM(L), PBM
- 林树评

Member of the Singapore Parliament for Havelock
- In office 24 February 1967 – 18 April 1970
- Preceded by: Loh Miaw Gong
- Succeeded by: Hon Sui Sen

Personal details
- Born: Lim Soo Peng; 1928 Singapore, Straits Settlements
- Died: 27 July 2026 (aged 98) Singapore
- Party: People's Action Party (PAP)
- Occupation: Businessman, politician
- Awards: Pingat Bakti Masyarakat (PBM); Bintang Bakti Masyarakat (BBM)

Lim Soo Peng (Note: Chinese: 林树评; Pe̍h-ōe-jī: Lîm Sū-phêng; pinyin: Lín Shùpíng) (1928 – 27 July 2026) was a Singaporean politician and businessman who served as the Member of Parliament (MP) for Havelock from 1967 to 1970. He was a member of the People's Action Party (PAP). After leaving politics, Lim worked in the chemical industry and was involved in Singapore's prison and rehabilitation services.

== Political career ==
Lim was appointed a Justice of the Peace in 1966. On 24 February 1967, he became the MP for Havelock by walkover, having been nominated as the PAP candidate after the resignation of Barisan Sosialis member Loh Miaw Gong.

In July 1969, Lim was scheduled to inaugurate a free mass X-ray campaign organised by the Singapore Anti-Tuberculosis Association at a community centre clinic in the constituency. On 30 August 1969, he inspected the Red Cross Guard of Honour at the 16th Annual Speech Day of Outram Secondary School.

In April 1970, he resigned from Parliament along with four other PAP MPs. PAP secretary-general and then-prime minister Lee Kuan Yew said that the resignations would make way for new members in Parliament. Lim had also reportedly requested to resign so that he could spend more time on his business.

== Business career ==
In 1962, Lim co-founded Chemical Industries (Far East) Limited and served as its chairman and managing director for several decades. He later served as chairman of FHTK Holdings Limited from 1994 to 2005 and as a director of the company from 2005 to 2007.

In 2024, Chemical Industries rejected allegations by minority shareholders that Lim had received favourable post-retirement benefits from the company, stating that facilities and assistance provided to him were related to his duties as emeritus chairman. The shareholders also questioned the nomination of his son, Lim Yew Nghee, as deputy chairman.

Lim retired from Chemical Industries as emeritus chairman in July 2025, at the age of 96.

== Community service and awards ==
After leaving Parliament, Lim became involved in Singapore's prison and rehabilitation services. He served as a Home Team volunteer for 55 years and held positions on the Prisons Board of Visiting Justices and Board of Inspection and the Drug Rehabilitation Centre Committee. He regularly visited prisons and took part in discussions with inmates, conveying their concerns to the authorities.

Lim received the Public Service Medal in 1997 and the Public Service Star in 2001.

== Personal life and death ==
Lim was married and had two sons, Eric Lim Yew Tou and Lim Yew Nghee, both of whom later joined him as executives and board members at Chemical Industries Limited.

Lim died on 27 July 2026. Prime Minister Lawrence Wong paid tribute to him, citing his work on behalf of Havelock residents and his community service after leaving politics.
