= Hon Sui Sen =

Singaporean politician

Hon Sui Sen DUT PBC
- 韩瑞生
- Hon in 1975

Minister for Finance
- In office 11 August 1970 – 14 October 1983
- Prime Minister: Lee Kuan Yew
- Preceded by: Goh Keng Swee
- Succeeded by: Tony Tan

Chairman of the Monetary Authority of Singapore
- In office January 1971 – July 1980
- Prime Minister: Lee Kuan Yew
- Preceded by: Position established
- Succeeded by: Goh Keng Swee

Member of the Singapore Parliament for Havelock Constituency
- In office 8 April 1970 – 14 October 1983
- Preceded by: Lim Soo Peng
- Succeeded by: Constituency abolished

Personal details
- Born: Benedict Hon Sui Sen; 16 April 1916 Balik Pulau, Penang, Straits Settlements (now Malaysia)
- Died: 14 October 1983 (aged 67) Singapore
- Party: People's Action Party
- Spouse: Annie Voon See Chin
- Children: 4
- Education: Raffles College

Benedict Hon Sui Sen (Note: Chinese: 韩瑞生; Pha̍k-fa-sṳ: Hòn Sui-sên; pinyin: Hán Ruìshēng) (16 April 1916 – 14 October 1983) was a Singaporean politician who served as Minister for Finance between 1970 and 1983. A member of the governing People's Action Party (PAP), he was the Member of Parliament (MP) for Havelock Constituency between 1970 and 1983.

== Early life ==
Hon Sui Sen was born into a Hakka Chinese family on 16 April 1916 in Penang in the British Straits Settlements. Educated at Saint Xavier's Institution, he earned the top place in the 1932 Senior Cambridge Certificate Examination. In 1935, he commenced studies at Raffles College in Singapore and graduated in 1938 with a Class I Diploma in Science.

== Career ==
After graduation, Hon entered the Straits Settlements Civil Service as a Police Court Magistrate. Following this, he assumed responsibilities as a Deputy Collector of Land Revenue prior to the Japanese occupation of Malaya and Singapore. After the War, Hon remained with the Land Office and by 1957 had become Land Commissioner. In 1960, Hon was attached to the World Bank for an economic management course, where he met Albert Winsemius. Winsemius led the United Nations Survey Mission to Singapore in late 1960 and played a major role in the formulation of Singapore's national economic development strategy.

=== Economic Development Board ===
From 1961 to 1968, Hon returned to serve as the first Chairman of the Economic Development Board (EDB) and then from 1968 to 1970 as Chairman of the Development Bank of Singapore (DBS).

As Chairman of the EDB, Hon played a key role in the implementation of Singapore's industrialisation strategy, with the Jurong Industrial Estate (JIE) as the first major project. Sited on swamplands in the west of Singapore, the JIE soon became the centrepiece of an industrialisation programme that stretched from garments and toys to petrochemicals and electronics. The first factory in Jurong, the National Iron and Steel Mill, was opened on 2 August 1963. By 1968, there were about 300 factories employing 21,000 people in Jurong. In conjunction with the development of the industrial estate, satellite towns were built in the west of Singapore, transforming the Jurong area into a centre of both industrial and residential development.

=== Singapore Institute of Management ===
From 1965 to 1968, Hon was a council member of the Singapore Institute of Management.

=== Development Bank of Singapore & Intraco ===
In 1968, Hon helped to spearhead the formation of the Development Bank of Singapore (DBS) and Intraco. During his time with DBS, Hon was a supporter of the establishment of the Asian dollar market and thus played a key role in the development of Singapore's financial services industry.

== Political career ==
In 1970, Hon succeeded Goh Keng Swee as Minister of Finance and served in that capacity for 13 years until 1983. In a letter by his daughter Joan many years after Hon's passing, Joan wrote that Hon was drawing a salary of $10,000 per month at DBS before he became a Minister, a job that paid him $3,000 instead; by 1983 when he died, Hon received $14,000 in total per month.

In 1982, Hon was named the Economic Minister of the Year by Euromoney.

As Singapore's Finance Minister, Hon established the Bases Economic Conversion Department to oversee the conversion and commercialisation of lands and facilities that had been left behind by the British military following their withdrawal in 1968. Hon also played a major role in the development of Singapore's tourism industry, beginning with the transformation of Pulau Blakang Mati, a previously fortified island off the southern coast of Singapore, into a resort destination under the new appellation of Sentosa Island.

Hon was appointed as the chairman of the Monetary Authority of Singapore (MAS) between 1971 and 1980.

== Awards ==
Hon was awarded the Distinguished Service Medal in 1967, and the Order of Temasek in 1984.

== Legacy ==
The National University of Singapore's Hon Sui Sen Memorial Library and Hon Sui Sen Drive in the campus are named after him. His office is also preserved within the library, while some of his legacy artefacts have been donated by family and put on showcase at the National Museum of Singapore as of December 2015.

== Bilbography ==
- Hon, Joan (1984). Relatively speaking. Singapore: Times Books Internat. ISBN 978-9971-65-152-7.

== Personal life ==
Hon was married to Annie and had four daughters, among whom include writer Joan Hon.

Hon died of a heart attack on 14 October 1983 while still in office as Finance Minister.

== See also ==
- List of members of the Singapore Parliament who died in office
