= 1951 Singaporean general election =

- 10 April 1951

9 of the 25 seats in the Legislative Council
- Registered: 48,155
- Turnout: 52.05% (▼11.20pp)
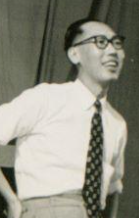

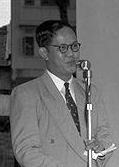
	Majority party	Minority party
Leader	Tan Chye Cheng	Lim Yew Hock
Party	Progressive	Labour
Leader's seat	contested Tanglin, won	contested Keppel, won
Last election	49.49%, 3 seats	–
Seats won	6	2
Seat change	▲3	New
Popular vote	11,202	7,335
Percentage	45.37%	29.70%
Swing	▼4.12pp	New
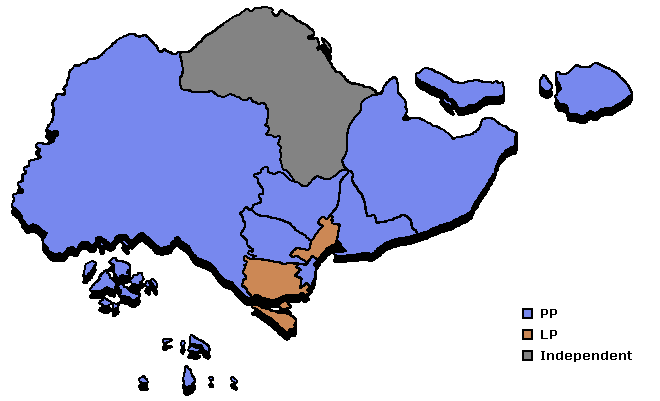
- Results by constituency

General elections were held in Singapore on 10 April 1951 to elect nine members of the Legislative Council. This election followed amendments to the Constitution which expanded the number of elected seats from six to nine out of a total of 25 seats. As in 1948, the franchise remained limited to British subjects who met strict specific residential and income qualifications, with the total number of registered voters only slightly increased to about 48,000.

The Progressive Party (PP) continued to dominate the political landscape, winning six of the nine contested seats. The Labour Party (SLP), which had emerged as a new political force, secured two seats, while the final seat went to an independent candidate. Political participation remained relatively low, with voter turnout at only 52%. Despite the presence of new political actors, the overall control of the Legislative Council remained firmly in the hands of appointed members and the British colonial administration.

The 1951 election highlighted the continued limitations of the colonial electoral system. While it represented a modest increase in electoral representation compared to 1948, significant segments of the population, which included most of the Chinese-educated and working-class communities, remained disenfranchised. Critics of the system argued that the colonial government's cautious reforms did little to address calls for genuine self-governance. Nonetheless, the election set the stage for more substantial political changes later in the decade, as political parties and nationalist sentiment began to grow in influence.

== Electoral system ==
The Legislative Council of Singapore was expanded from 22 to 25 members, with the number of popularly elected seats increased from six to nine. Three seats were allocated to representatives nominated by commercial organisations: the Singapore Chamber of Commerce, the Chinese Chamber of Commerce and the Indian Chamber of Commerce.

The remaining 13 members were appointed by the British colonial government and included the Governor, Colonial Secretary, Financial Secretary, Attorney-General, Solicitor-General, two departmental directors, two ex officio commissioners and four non-ex officio members. Among the appointed members was Elizabeth Choy, a war heroine and social worker, who had previously contested the 1950 Municipal Commission elections but was not elected. She was the only woman appointed to the Council.

The British authorities also approved a proposal from political parties to redraw constituency boundaries within Singapore. Six constituencies were established based on municipal districts, including Balestier, Keppel, Katong and Tanglin. In the rural areas, the number of constituencies was increased from two to three, and previously used joint districts were abolished. These changes were intended to reflect population distribution more accurately and to facilitate political contestation within clearer geographic divisions.

Despite these adjustments, voting remained non-compulsory, and the franchise continued to be highly restricted. Eligibility was limited to British subjects over the age of 21 who had resided in Singapore for at least one year as well as specific income qualifications, effectively excluding large segments of the local population from participating in the electoral process.

== Campaign ==
A 32-day campaign period was scheduled, with nomination day set for 8 March 1951. The Labour Party (SLP), which had established itself as the Progressive Party (PP)'s main political rival at the municipal level, contested seats in the Legislative Council for the first time. Notably, Mansoor bin Adabi, a prominent Malay politician and husband of Maria Hertogh, the young ethnic Dutch woman whose disputed custody sparked the Maria Hertogh riots in late 1950, intended to contest in Bukit Timah under the PP banner. However, he withdrew his nomination at the final moment for reasons that remain unclear. The campaign manager for the PP's vice-chairman John Laycock was Lee Kuan Yew, then a legal assistant in Laycock's law firm and later the founder of the People's Action Party (PAP) in 1954.

48,155 voters were registered for this election. This number was a small fraction of Singapore's total population, which was estimated at around 950,000 in 1951, illustrating the highly restricted nature of the franchise. Several boycott calls had been made in response to these limitations and ongoing political dissatisfaction. Additionally, Singapore was still recovering from the social unrest caused by the Maria Hertogh riots, which occurred roughly four months prior to the election, affecting voter sentiment and turnout.

== Results ==
Voter turnout fell significantly compared to the previous election in 1948, declining by approximately 11 percentage points to 52.05%. Turnout was highest in Seletar at 69.2%, while City recorded the lowest at just 43.9%. The election was also notable for featuring the first electoral contest for the seat reserved for the Indian Chamber of Commerce; both the Singapore Chamber of Commerce and the Chinese Chamber of Commerce seats were uncontested.

Vilasini Menon became the first woman elected to the Legislative Council, winning in Seletar as an independent candidate by defeating both the PP and the SLP candidates. PP leader Tan Chye Cheng was the most successful candidate in terms of vote share, securing 80% of the votes in Tanglin. By contrast, independent candidate Mirza Abdul Majid received only 4% of the votes in City, becoming the sole candidate to forfeit the $500 election deposit. SLP leader Lim Yew Hock obtained the highest absolute number of votes, 2,369 in Keppel, while SLP candidate Thomas Davies Richards was the lowest-performing candidate from a political party by raw votes, polling just 351 in Tanglin.

In terms of victory margins, SLP candidate Caralapati Raghaviah Dasaratha Raj won his seat by the narrowest margin of 6.56%, whereas PP leader Tan Chye Cheng achieved the largest margin, winning by 60.27%. The Progressive Party won six out of nine contested seats, making it the first and only party prior to 1959 to secure a two-thirds majority in the Legislative Council, a feat not matched by any other party except the PAP in the future.

Popular vote
1. PP (45.4%)
2. SLP (29.7%)
3. Independents (24.9%)
Seats won
1. 6 seats (PP) (66.7%)
2. 2 seats (SLP) (22.2%)
3. 1 seat (Independent) (11.1%)

Party	Votes	%	Seats	+/–
Progressive Party	11,202	45.37	6	+3
Labour Party	7,335	29.70	2	New
Independents	6,156	24.93	1	–2
Total	24,693	100.00	9	+3
Valid votes	24,693	98.52		
Invalid/blank votes	372	1.48		
Total votes	25,065	100.00		
Registered voters/turnout	48,155	52.05		
Source: Singapore Elections

Parties contested vote
Party	Votes
Progressive	52.42%
Independent	40.78%
Labour	38.54%

=== By constituency ===
Constituency	Electorate	Party	Candidate	Votes	%	Margin
Balestier	5,246	Progressive Party	Thio Chan Bee	1,560	58.34	36.16
Balestier	5,246	Labour Party	Peter Massillamany Williams	593	22.18	36.16
Balestier	5,246	Independent	Jagatheesan Kalimuthu	521	19.48	36.16
Bukit Timah	3,850	Progressive Party	Hollupatherage James Caldera Kulasingha	1,311	57.15	14.30
Bukit Timah	3,850	Labour Party	Valiya Purayil Abdullah	983	42.85	14.30
Changi	3,623	Progressive Party	Charles Joseph Pemberton Paglar	1,486	72.52	45.04
Changi	3,623	Labour Party	Syed Mohamed Abdul Hameed Chisty	563	27.48	45.04
City	5,611	Progressive Party	Nazir Ahmad Mallal	1,308	53.85	11.65
City	5,611	Independent	Balwant Singh Bajaj	1,025	42.20	11.65
City	5,611	Independent	Mirza Abdul Majid	96	3.95	11.65
Katong	6,669	Progressive Party	John Laycock	2,075	64.20	28.40
Katong	6,669	Independent	Goh Hood Kiat	1,157	35.80	28.40
Keppel	6,683	Labour Party	Lim Yew Hock	2,369	67.96	35.92
Keppel	6,683	Progressive Party	Arumugam Ponnu Rajah	1,117	32.04	35.92
Rochore	7,493	Labour Party	Caralapati Raghaviah Dasaratha Raj	1,433	43.12	6.56
Rochore	7,493	Independent	Mohamed Javad Namazie	1,215	36.56	6.56
Rochore	7,493	Independent	Pandarapillai Thillai Nathan	675	20.32	6.56
Seletar	5,025	Independent	Vilasini Menon	1,467	42.66	12.33
Seletar	5,025	Labour Party	Gopalan Nair Nanupillai	1,043	30.33	12.33
Seletar	5,025	Progressive Party	V. Vayloo Pakirisamy	929	27.01	12.33
Tanglin	3,955	Progressive Party	Tan Chye Cheng	1,416	80.14	60.28
Tanglin	3,955	Labour Party	Thomas Davies Richards	351	19.86	60.28
Singapore Chamber of Commerce	–	–	Ewen MacGregor Field Fergusson	Uncontested		
Chinese Chamber of Commerce	–	–	Tan Chin Tuan	Uncontested		
Indian Chamber of Commerce	248	–	Rajabali Jumabhoy	147	62.03	24.06
Indian Chamber of Commerce	248	–	Hardial Singh	90	37.97	24.06
Source: Singapore Elections

== See also ==
- List of Singaporean electoral divisions (1951–55)
