= Ho Kah Leong =

Singaporean politician

- 何家良

Member of the Singapore Parliament for Jurong SMC
- In office 2 November 1966 – 16 December 1996
- Preceded by: Chia Thye Poh (BS)
- Succeeded by: Constituency abolished

Personal details
- Born: Ho Kah Leong; 21 September 1937 (age 88) Singapore, Straits Settlements
- Party: People's Action Party
- Spouse: Kho Choo Eng (died 1996) Grace Chan Lai Kiew (m. 1997)
- Children: 4
- Parents: Ho Foo Sen (father); Wong Kaw Moey (mother)
- Education: Bachelor of Science
- Alma mater: Nanyang University

Ho Kah Leong (Note: Chinese: 何家良; Jyutping: Ho^{4} Gaa^{1} Loeng^{4}; pinyin: Hé Jiāliáng) (born 21 September 1937) is a former Singaporean politician and was a member of the People's Action Party (PAP). He was the Member of Parliament (MP) for Jurong Single Member Constituency (SMC) from 1966 to 1997. After retirement from politics in December 1996, he became the principal of Nanyang Academy of Fine Arts (NAFA) from 1997 to 2003, and Executive director of NAFA International Pte Ltd from 2003 to 2005.

== Education ==
Ho studied at Sin Sheng School and then Chung Cheng High School. He went on to study at NAFA from 1955 to 1956 before obtaining a Bachelor of Science degree from Nanyang University in 1963.

== Career ==
After graduation, Ho became a teacher and taught at Nan Chiau High School and Chung Hwa Girls' High School.

Ho is additionally an artist and paints oil paintings on nature and serene Malay villages. Ho also does calligraphy. He had also participated in many group exhibitions such as the President’s Charity Art Exhibition in October 1997, and had held 14 solo exhibitions.

Ho frequently donated his paintings and works for charity. His coffee-table book on his works, Beautiful Lion City: The Art of Ho Kah Leong, was sold to raise funds to upgrade PAP Community Foundation kindergartens. He had also produced calendars featuring his paintings to raise funds for others such as building funds for the Basketball Association and the Jurong Town Community Centre.

After retiring from politics in December 1996, Ho joined his alma mater, NAFA, as its principal in 1997. In 2003, he became an Executive director of NAFA International Pte Ltd till 2005.

He is also the president of the Singapore Arts Federation.

=== Political career ===
In November 1966, after then Jurong SMC's MP, Chia Thye Poh of Barisan Sosialis (BS), resigned as part of BS boycott of parliament, a by-election was called and Ho, representing the PAP, took the seat after a walkover. At the age of 29 during the by-election, Ho was the youngest debuting MP-elect in post-independence at the time, since Ng Kah Ting, aged 23 during his debut in 1963.

Ho was also parliamentary secretary for the Ministry of Education and later served as senior parliamentary secretary for the Ministry of Communications and Information and the Ministry of the Environment.

Ho left politics in 1997, after 31 years of serving as MP for the Jurong SMC. At the time of retirement, Ho and then-Senior Minister Lee Kuan Yew are the remaining members of the pre-independence Legislative Assembly; Ho's departure left with Lee as the last remaining member of said Legislature until his death in 2015.

== Personal life ==
Ho's wife, Kho Choo Eng, passed in 1996. He then remarried Grace Chan Lai Kiew in 1997. He has one son and three daughters.
