= Loh Miaw Gong =

Singaporean politician

Loh Miaw Gong (Note: Chinese: 卢妙娥; Pe̍h-ōe-jī: Lô͘ Miāu-gô; pinyin: Lú Miào'é) (born c. 1936; also known as Loh Meow Gong and Loh Miao Ping (Note: Chinese: 卢妙萍; pinyin: Lú Miàopíng)) is a Singaporean politician, trade unionist and former political prisoner. She is a member of the defunct Barisan Sosialis and served as the member of Parliament for Havelock Constituency from 1963 to 1966.

== Career ==
Loh was the secretary of the Singapore General Employee's Union.

=== Political career ===
She was elected a member of the Legislative Assembly in 1963. However, before she could occupy her seat, she was detained under the Internal Security Act (ISA).

In 1965, Loh was one of the only three women MPs and the only woman opposition member in the first parliament of Singapore.

On 6 December 1966, Loh, along with other Barisan's elected members of parliament, resigned as member of parliament.

In 2011, Loh signed a statement with other 15 former detainees under the ISA to abolish the ISA.
