= Chia Thye Poh =

Singaporean former politician

- 谢太宝

4th Leader of the Opposition (Note: De facto, not an official position in parliamentary proceedings.)
- In office 1 January 1966 – 7 October 1966
- Preceded by: Lim Huan Boon
- Succeeded by: J. B. Jeyaretnam (1981)

Member of the Singapore Parliament for Jurong Constituency (Note: Formerly the Legislative Assembly from 1963 to 1965.)
- In office 21 September 1963 – 7 October 1966
- Preceded by: Chor Yeok Eng (PAP)
- Succeeded by: Ho Kah Leong (PAP)
- Majority: 1963: 3,973 (55.85%)

Member of the Malaysian Parliament for Singapore
- In office 2 November 1963 – 9 August 1965
- Preceded by: Position established
- Succeeded by: Position abolished

Personal details
- Born: Chia Thye Poh; 4 April 1941 (age 85) Singapore in the Straits Settlements
- Party: Barisan Sosialis
- Education: Nanyang University; Institute of Social Studies

Chia Thye Poh (Note: Chinese: 谢太宝; Pe̍h-ōe-jī: Chiā Thài-pó; pinyin: Xiè Tàibǎo) (born 4 April 1941) is a Singaporean former politician who was the de facto Leader of the Opposition in 1966. He was the Legislative Assemblyman and later Member of Parliament (MP) for Jurong Constituency from 1963 to 1966.

Accused of engaging in pro-communist activity and of seeking to foment a communist revolution, he was held without trial for 23 years from 1966 to 1989. Following this, he was subjected to a further nine years of restrictions amounting to house arrest, first on the island of Sentosa and subsequently under stringent curbs upon his residence, employment, travel and political expression. These conditions were lifted in 1998.

Before his detention, Chia had been a teacher, a lecturer in physics, a socialist political activist and a sitting Member of Parliament. After his release from formal restrictions, he pursued studies at the doctoral level and later worked as an interpreter.

== Early life ==
Born on 4 April 1941, Chia studied physics at Nanyang University. Upon graduating, he worked briefly as a secondary school teacher before becoming a graduate assistant at his alma mater.

== Political activism ==
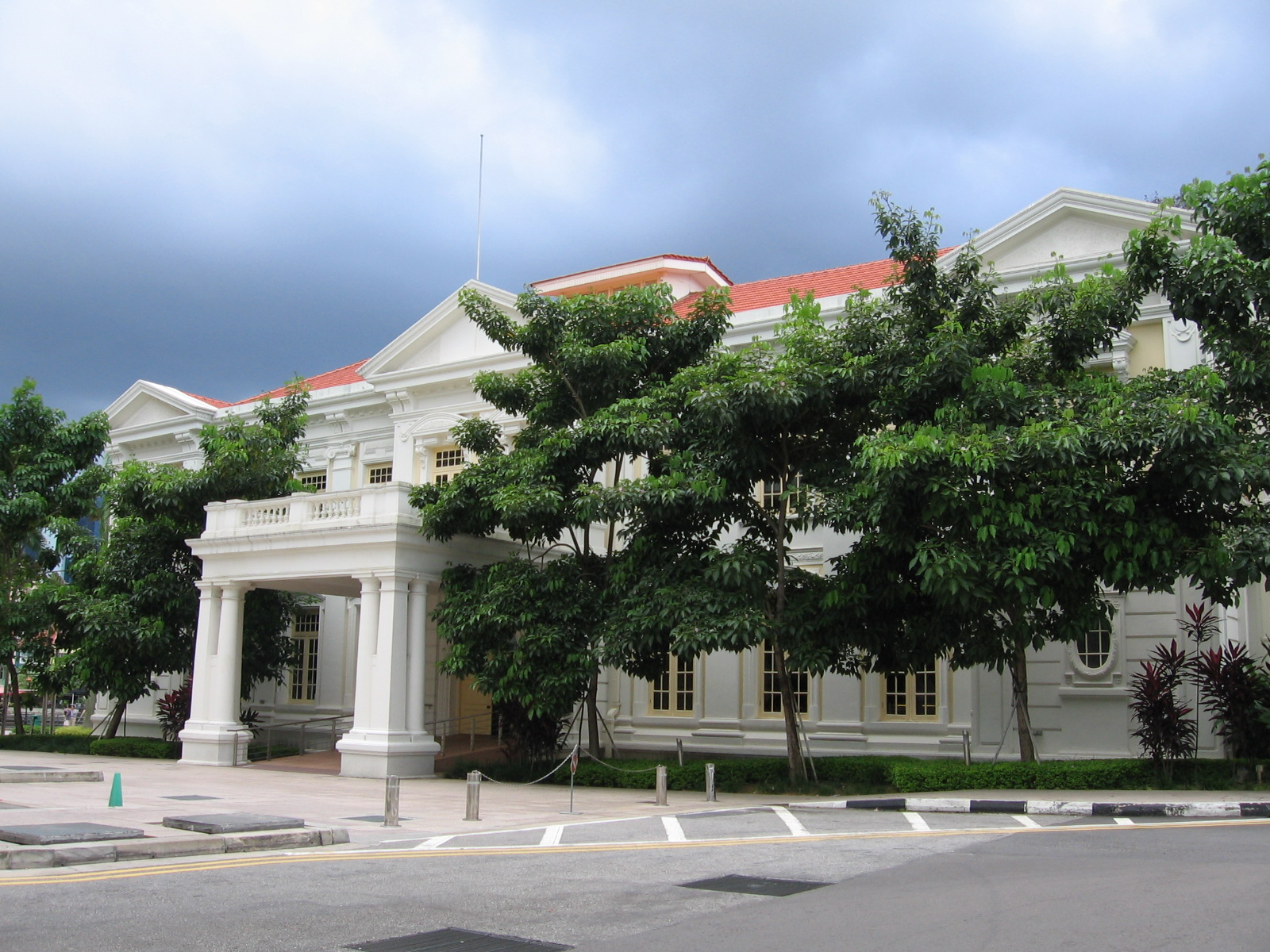
The old Parliament House in Singapore, site of demonstrations by Barisan Sosialis in 1966

Barisan Sosialis MPs protesting outside the Old Parliament House, 1966

As a member of the Barisan Sosialis political party (BS), he was elected member of the Legislative Assembly for Jurong Constituency in 1963. Concurrent with his holding of office, he worked as a university physics professor.

Chia was banned permanently from entering Malaysia in the wake of a political speech he delivered to the Perak division of the Labour Party of Malaya on 24 April 1966.

In July 1966, Chia was convicted for publishing a seditious article in the BS's Chinese-language newspaper. In the same month, he was arrested together with 25 others and charged with unlawful assembly for participating in a demonstration opposing United States involvement in the Vietnam War, which resulted in open confrontation with police. He was active among peace campaigners calling for an end to the U.S. bombing of Indochina during the Vietnam War in the 1960s.

In early October 1966, Chia and eight other BS MPs boycotted Parliament over the ruling People's Action Party (PAP) decision to split from Malaysia. This action was part of BS's strategy to protest what it viewed as "undemocratic acts" by carrying the struggle beyond Parliament. He declared that the struggle would employ "street demonstrations, protest meetings [and] strikes". On 7 October, Chia resigned from the Parliament. On 8 October, he led an illegal protest march of 30 supporters to Parliament House, delivering a letter to the Clerk of the House demanding a general election under eight specified conditions, the release of all political detainees and the revocation of all "undemocratic" laws.

== Arrest and imprisonment ==
On 29 October 1966, Chia and 22 other leaders of the BS were arrested under powers granted by the ISA. In its official statement, the Government alleged that BS's attempt to mobilise a mass struggle outside of Parliament has posed a threat to Singapore's stability, and Chia was viewed as a revolutionary. This wave of arrests followed an earlier one in 1963, which included those carried out during Operation Coldstore. Chia himself was detained specifically for his role in organising and leading the street procession of 8 October.

=== Ties with the Communist Party of Malaya ===
The other detainees were eventually released after signing documents in which they promised to renounce violence and cut ties with the Communist Party of Malaya (CPM). Chia refused to do so, arguing that such an undertaking would imply he had once been affiliated with the CPM, which he denied. He explained his stance by stating: "to renounce violence is to imply you advocated violence before. If I had signed that statement I would not have lived in peace." As a result, and without ever facing indictment or criminal trial, he became one of the longest-serving political prisoners in the world. Restrictions on his civil rights remained in force for more than 32 years following his arrest, and the duration of his detention was often compared to that of Nelson Mandela, who spent over 27 years in prison following his conviction for treason, sabotage and other political crimes.

Chia was deprived of Singapore citizenship in February 1968 after failing to produce a birth certificate to prove his claim of being born in Singapore in 1941. That same year, in August, he was served with a Banishment Order and kept in Queenstown Remand Prison "awaiting deportation" (reportedly to China) until 1976, when the order was withdrawn and replaced with a new detention order under the ISA. During his incarceration, he spent long periods in solitary confinement at the Whitley Road Detention Centre, before being transferred in 1978 to the Moon Crescent Detention Centre within Changi Prison. In 1982, he was moved into a succession of government halfway houses, and by 1985 the government asserted that his detention was based on allegations of CPM membership and his supposed willingness to engage in political violence and terrorism against Singapore.

== Release ==
Map of Sentosa, where Chia was confined to

=== Confinement ===
On 17 May 1989, he was released from 23 years of imprisonment without charge or trial on the mainland, and instead confined to a one-room guardhouse on Sentosa where he was required to pay the rent on the pretext that he was then a "free" man. He was also required to purchase and prepare his own food. As he had no money, he was offered a job as the assistant curator under the employ of Sentosa Development Corporation (SDC).

He refused the offer on the understanding that it was a government civil service position in which he might, as a result, be "muzzled" from talking to the media without official permission. Instead, he negotiated an arrangement where he worked as a freelance translator for the SDC. About that time, he remarked about the circumstances of his continuing detention and the culture of politics in Singapore in general, continuing to criticise the PAP of arrogance and elitism, including ruling with "iron-handed policies".

=== Reduced restrictions ===
In 1990, some of the restrictions on Chia were eased. He later attributed this partial relaxation to the efforts of foreign governments, in particular representations made by Chancellor Helmut Kohl of West Germany in the mid-1980s, which he believed influenced Singapore's decision to soften its stance towards him. In 1992, he was permitted to return to the mainland to visit his parents' home, though he remained subject to limitations on his movements, associations and activities.

Further concessions were made in November 1997, when restrictions were relaxed to the extent that he could accept a fellowship from the Hamburg Foundation of the German government for politically persecuted persons. This enabled him to spend a year in Hamburg, where he studied economics, politics and the German language. He was also granted the right to change his residence and seek employment without first securing permission from the Internal Security Department (ISD). In 1998, he underwent a prostate operation in Singapore, and by November that year his sole source of income was reported to be freelance translation work. On 27 November 1998, all remaining restrictions on him were lifted, restoring his right to speak publicly, attend political meetings and engage in political activities. On the same day, he called on the Government to repeal the ISA and expressed interest in returning to political life. Amnesty International also issued a statement marking the end of restrictions on "Singapore's longest serving prisoner of conscience", describing the decision as more than thirty years overdue.

== Since release ==
In late 2000, Chia was pursuing a master's degree in development studies at the Institute of Social Studies (ISS) in The Hague, and was expected to complete his studies and return to Singapore by December of that year. He later continued his academic work at the institute, and in 2006 the supervision of his PhD thesis was completed. He was subsequently conferred his doctorate.

A March 2008 version of his staff profile at the ISS listed his position as project assistant to the project MPA in Governance, Suriname. In late 2011, he was awarded the Lim Lian Geok Spirit Award at a public ceremony in Kuala Lumpur. In 2015, he was nominated for the Nobel Peace Prize.

== Writings ==
- Transplanted or Endogenized? FDI and Industrial Upgrading in Developing Countries. Case study of Indonesia (2006), Shaker Publishing

== Notes ==
Preceded by Chor Yeok Eng	Member of Parliament for Jurong; 1963–1966	Succeeded by Ho Kah Leong
