= List of Singaporean electoral divisions (1951–1955) =

Electoral divisions in Singapore from 1951 to 1955

This is a list of Singapore’s electoral divisions which were existence during the period of 1951 to 1955 between the 1951 and 1955 elections. The pre-existing four districts for the 1948 elections were redrawn into nine districts, each with one seat in the Legislative Council.

Constituency	Seats	Electorate (1951)
Balestier	1	5,246
Bukit Timah	1	3,850
Changi	1	3,623
City	1	5,611
Katong	1	6,669
Keppel	1	6,683
Rochore	1	7,493
Seletar	1	2,274
Tanglin	1	3,955

== Changes ==
Constituency	Divisions formed from
Balestier	Municipal North–East
Bukit Timah	Rural West
Changi	Rural East
City	Municipal South–West
Katong	Municipal North–East
Keppel	Municipal South–West
Rochore	Municipal North–East
Rochore	Municipal South–West
Seletar	Rural East
Seletar	Rural West
Tanglin	Municipal South–West
