= List of electoral divisions and wards in Singapore =

The list of all the constituencies and electoral divisions that have been present in Singapore, as well as changes made in each division over the years in Singapore's history.

== History ==
There are divisions that have been available from the past to present, although some divisions have been renamed over the years due to population changes. In the first-ever elections of Singapore in 1948, it was simplified to just four divisions, the two-seat Municipal North-East and South-West constituencies, and the single-seat Rural East and Rural West constituencies.

The British authorities tabled an amendment on redistricting the constituency boundaries within Singapore based on municipal districts to reflect population distribution more accurately and to facilitate political contestation within clearer geographic divisions, while removing joint districts. These changes were enacted in 1951 and resulted in the formation of nine constituencies, all single-seats at the time, which later collectively known as Single Member Constituencies (SMC). The number of seats subsequently expanded over the years while Chamber of Commerce were abolished in 1959. The team that oversees the redistricting process would later be called Electoral Boundaries Review Committee (EBRC), which were responsible to maintain even distribution across voters in each election.

On 1 June 1988, the Parliament enacted the creation of Group Representation Constituencies, which was used in the subsequent election held three months later, to ensure the ethnic representation and the Town Council scheme, which was earlier enacted in 1986. Under the current Parliamentary Elections Act, the map requires at least one-quarter of the total seats to be allocated as GRCs and to have at least eight SMCs at any time. In that election, 36 (or approximately 45%) of the 79 seats were redistricted into 13 three-member GRCs with the creation of additional SMCs, leaving with 42 SMCs on the map. Subsequent elections raised the GRCs seats to a size between four and six and the SMCs were drastically reduced; in 1991, there were 15 (all) four-member GRCs and 21 SMCs, then in 1997, only nine SMCs remain while the other 74 (approximately 89%) seats were consolidated among 15 GRCs (an average of 4.93 seats). The average size of each GRCs peaked at 5.36 in the 2000s (while also have nine SMCs as well and absence of four-member GRCs), while beginning a practice where a few existing GRCs (between two and five) had no changes in the electoral boundaries, (Note: To properly define a GRC with no boundary changes, the GRC must comprise the exact same boundaries from the last general election (disregarding town council divisions) and the number of seats to return in the parliament are the same.) but this was lowered in subsequent elections starting in 2011 due to the increase of parliamentary seats and SMCs under the Prime Minister's advice to EBRC, and by 2015, that average size surpassed those of 1997's size at 4.75 while the number of SMCs and GRCs were gradually increased as well, and these changes persist in subsequent elections, culminating to the elimination of six-member GRCs beginning in the 2020 election. Conversely, divisions are also formed but most of the divisions had never carved out as an SMC on its lifetime or were renamed.

As of the 2025 revision of boundaries, there were 195 divisions and 37 Group Representation Constituencies (GRC) created in total. Per consistency reasons, the 13 GRCs that either had double-barrelled names or as an entire place of GRC, were not considered as a division and therefore these are being excluded from the list. (Note: The GRCs are: Bishan–Toa Payoh, East Coast, Holland–Bukit Panjang, Holland–Bukit Timah, Jurong East–Bukit Batok, Kreta Ayer–Tanglin, Marine Parade–Braddell Heights, Marsiling–Yew Tee, Moulmein–Kallang, Pasir Ris–Changi, Pasir Ris–Punggol, Sengkang and West Coast–Jurong West. Pasir Ris is excluded from the list as it was used as a past electoral division despite not being carved as an SMC.)

Summary of distribution of constituencies and divisions (1951–84)
	1951	1955	1959	1963	1968	1972	1976	1980	1984
Total parliamentary seats (Note: Including Chamber of Commerce seats; excluding Non-constituency nor Nominated MPs.)	25	32	51	51	58	65	69	75	79
Electoral divisions	9	25	51	51	58	65	69	75	79
Total electorate (Note: Including electorate voting in overseas at the time of election and those residing in uncontested constituencies.)	48,155	300,199	586,098	617,750	759,367	908,382	1,095,817	1,290,426	1,495,389
Average electorate per seat	5,351	12,008	11,492	12,113	13,093	13,975	15,881	17,206	18,929

Summary of distribution of constituencies and divisions (1988–present)
	1988	1991	1997	2001	2006	2011	2015	2020	2025
Total parliamentary seats	81	81	83	84	84	87	89	93	97
Electoral divisions	55	36	24	23	23	27	29	31	33
Single member constituencies	42	21	9	9	9	12	13	14	15
Group representation constituencies	13	15	15	14	14	15	16	17	18
Three-member GRCs	13	0	0	0	0	0	0	0	0
Four-member GRCs	0	15	5	0	0	2	6	6	8
Five-member GRCs	0	0	6	9	9	11	8	11	10
Six-member GRCs	0	0	4	5	5	2	2	0	0
Average GRC size	3.00	4.00	4.93	5.36	5.36	5.00	4.75	4.65	4.56
Percentage of divisions as GRCs	44.44%	74.07%	89.16%	89.29%	89.29%	86.21%	85.39%	84.95%	84.54%
Number of Malay-candidate required GRCs	8	9	9	9	9	9	10	11	11
Number of Indian/other minority-candidate required GRCs	5	6	6	5	5	6	6	6	7
Number of GRCs with no boundary changes	0	0	0	2	5	2	2	4	5
Total electorate	1,669,013	1,692,384	1,881,011	2,036,923	2,159,721	2,350,873	2,462,926	2,651,435	2,758,846
Average electorate per seat	20,605	20,894	22,663	24,249	25,711	27,022	27,673	28,510	28,442

== List of divisions ==
Colour key

	Division was a Single Member Constituency
	Division that shares the same name as a Group Representation Constituency
	Division that was in a Group Representation Constituency
	Division that was in a Group Representation Constituency but has no nominal MPs
	Division that was also the name of Group Representation Constituency but was currently not a division
Italics	Division that was in a Group Representation Constituency but was not made a SMC
(number)	Number of seats in a GRC is indicated in parentheses.

List of electoral divisions by constituency and year
Election year	1950–79						1980–99					2000–19				2020–		Appearance	
Election year	'51	'55	'59 '63 (Note: The 1963 election had no boundary changes for all the constituencies.)	'68	'72	'76	'80	'84	'88	'91	'97	'01	'06	'11	'15	'20	'25	As SMC	As GRC (Note: GRCs that contained the name of the divisions are counted as a division. GRCs that are named but does not contain the namesake division are not counted.)
Total	9	25	51	58	65	69	75	79	81		83	84		87	89	93	97	As SMC	As GRC
Division																			
Admiralty												Sembawang GRC (6)		Sembawang GRC (5)				0	6
Alexandra			SMC						Brickworks GRC (3)									6	1
Aljunied			SMC						Aljunied GRC (3)	Aljunied GRC (4)	Aljunied GRC (5)	Aljunied GRC (5)						6	3
Aljunied–Hougang												Aljunied GRC (5)						0	2
Aljunied–Kembangan												Aljunied GRC (5)						0	1
Anchorvale																Sengkang GRC (4) (Note: Identified in the People's Association grassroots branch as Sengkang West.)		0	2
Ang Mo Kio						SMC				Ang Mo Kio GRC (4)	Ang Mo Kio GRC (5)	Ang Mo Kio GRC (6)				Ang Mo Kio GRC (5)		4	2
Ang Mo Kio–Hougang														Ang Mo Kio GRC (6)		Ang Mo Kio GRC (5)		0	4
Anson			SMC															6	0
Ayer Rajah							SMC							West Coast GRC (5)	West Coast GRC (4)		West Coast–Jurong West GRC (5)	6	3
Ayer Rajah–Gek Poh																West Coast GRC (5)		0	1
Ayer Rajah–West Coast													West Coast GRC (5)					0	1
Balestier	SMC																	1	0
Bedok						SMC			Bedok GRC (3)	Bedok GRC (4)	East Coast GRC (5)	East Coast GRC (6)	East Coast GRC (5)		East Coast GRC (4)	East Coast GRC (5)		3	9
Bedok Reservoir–Punggol													Aljunied GRC (5)					0	5
Bishan East										Thomson GRC (4)	Bishan–Toa Payoh GRC (5)							0	5
Bishan East–Sin Ming																Bishan–Toa Payoh GRC (4)		0	2
Bishan East–Thomson															Bishan–Toa Payoh GRC (5)			0	1
Bishan South–Toa Payoh North											Bishan–Toa Payoh GRC (5)							0	3
Bishan North										Thomson GRC (4)				Bishan–Toa Payoh GRC (5)				0	3
Bo Wen								SMC										1	0
Boon Lay						SMC						West Coast GRC (5)			West Coast GRC (4)	West Coast GRC (5)	West Coast–Jurong West GRC (5)	6	6
Boon Teck					SMC				Toa Payoh GRC (3)	Toa Payoh GRC (4)								4	2
Braddell Heights						SMC					Marine Parade GRC (6)			Marine Parade GRC (5)			Marine Parade–Braddell Heights GRC (5)	5	7
Bras Basah			SMC															4	0
Brickland																Chua Chu Kang GRC (4) (Note: Identified in the People's Association grassroots branch as Brickland, though the division by its Town Council was named as Brickland–Tengah.)		0	2
Brickworks						SMC			Brickworks GRC (3)	Brickworks GRC (4)								3	2
Buangkok																Sengkang GRC (4) (Note: Identified in the People's Association grassroots branch as Sengkang Central.)		0	2
Buangkok–Fernvale South																	Ang Mo Kio GRC (5)	0	1
Bukit Batok					SMC						Bukit Timah GRC (5)	Jurong GRC (5)			SMC		Jurong East–Bukit Batok GRC (5)	8	5
Bukit Batok East												Jurong GRC (5)					Jurong East–Bukit Batok GRC (5)	0	6
Bukit Gombak									SMC			Hong Kah GRC (5)		Chua Chu Kang GRC (5)	Chua Chu Kang GRC (4)		SMC	4	5
Bukit Ho Swee					SMC													4	0
Bukit Merah			SMC															9	0
Bukit Panjang		SMC								Sembawang GRC (4)	Sembawang GRC (6)	Holland–Bukit Panjang GRC (5)	SMC					14	3
Bukit Timah	SMC										Bukit Timah GRC (5)	SMC	Holland-Bukit Timah GRC (5)	Holland–Bukit Timah GRC (4)				12	6
Buona Vista						SMC					Tanjong Pagar GRC (6)	Holland–Bukit Panjang GRC (5)	Holland–Bukit Timah GRC (5)	Tanjong Pagar GRC (5)				5	7
Cairnhill		SMC								Kampong Glam GRC (4)								9	1
Canberra												Sembawang GRC (6)		Nee Soon GRC (5)	Sembawang GRC (5)			0	6
Cashew												Holland–Bukit Panjang GRC (5)	Holland–Bukit Timah GRC (5)	Holland–Bukit Timah GRC (4)				0	6
Changi	SMC																Pasir Ris–Changi GRC (4)	11	1
Changi–Simei											Aljunied GRC (5)	East Coast GRC (6)	East Coast GRC (5)		East Coast GRC (4)	East Coast GRC (5)		0	7
Changkat								SMC	Tampines GRC (3)	Tampines GRC (4)								1	3
Changkat South										Tampines GRC (4)								0	1
Cheng San							SMC		Cheng San GRC (3)	Cheng San GRC (4)	Cheng San GRC (5)	Ang Mo Kio GRC (6)					Ang Mo Kio GRC (5)	2	5
Cheng San–Seletar													Ang Mo Kio GRC (6)			Ang Mo Kio GRC (5)		0	4
Chong Boon							SMC		Cheng San GRC (3)	Cheng San GRC (4)								2	2
Chong Pang									Sembawang GRC (3)	Sembawang GRC (4)	Sembawang GRC (6)			Nee Soon GRC (5)				0	9
Chua Chu Kang			SMC											Chua Chu Kang GRC (5)	Chua Chu Kang GRC (4)			12	4
City	SMC																	1	0
Clementi							SMC		Pasir Panjang GRC (3)	Brickworks GRC (4)	West Coast GRC (4)	West Coast GRC (5)			Jurong GRC (5)		Jurong East–Bukit Batok GRC (5)	2	9
Compassvale																Sengkang GRC (4) (Note: Identified in the People's Association grassroots branch as Sengkang North.)		0	2
Crawford			SMC															4	0
Delta			SMC															7	0
Eunos								SMC	Eunos GRC (3)	Eunos GRC (4)	Aljunied GRC (5)							1	9
Farrer Park		SMC																6	0
Fengshan								SMC		Bedok GRC (4)	East Coast GRC (6)		East Coast GRC (5)		SMC	East Coast GRC (5)		3	7
Fernvale																Ang Mo Kio GRC (5)		0	1
Gambas															Sembawang GRC (5)			0	1
Geylang		SMC																1	0
Geylang East			SMC															5	0
Geylang Serai			SMC						Marine Parade GRC (3)	Marine Parade GRC (4)	Marine Parade GRC (6)			Marine Parade GRC (5)			Marine Parade–Braddell Heights GRC (5)	7	9
Geylang West			SMC						Jalan Besar GRC (3)	Jalan Besar GRC (4)								7	3
Havelock		SMC																7	0
Henderson					SMC				Tiong Bahru GRC (3)									4	1
Henderson–Dawson															Tanjong Pagar GRC (5)			0	3
Hong Kah								SMC	Hong Kah GRC (3)	Hong Kah GRC (4)	Hong Kah GRC (5)							1	0
Hong Kah Central									Hong Kah GRC (3)									0	1
Hong Kah East										Hong Kah GRC (4)	Hong Kah GRC (5)							0	2
Hong Kah North									Hong Kah GRC (3)	Hong Kah GRC (4)	Hong Kah GRC (5)			SMC			Jurong East–Bukit Batok GRC (5)	3	6
Hong Kah South									Hong Kah GRC (3)	Hong Kah GRC (4)								0	2
Hong Kah West										Hong Kah GRC (4)	Hong Kah GRC (5)							0	2
Hong Lim			SMC															4	0
Hougang									SMC									9	0
Jalan Besar			SMC						Jalan Besar GRC (3)	Jalan Besar GRC (4)		Jalan Besar GRC (5)		Moulmein-Kallang GRC (4)	Jalan Besar GRC (4)			7	6
Jalan Kayu			SMC						Cheng San GRC (3)	Cheng San GRC (4)	Cheng San GRC (5)	Ang Mo Kio GRC (6)				Ang Mo Kio GRC (5)	SMC	8	8
Joo Chiat			SMC						Marine Parade GRC (3)	Marine Parade GRC (4)	East Coast GRC (6)	SMC			Marine Parade GRC (5)		East Coast GRC (5)	10	6
Jurong			SMC								Bukit Timah GRC (5)	Jurong GRC (5)						8	1
Jurong Central												Jurong GRC (5)					SMC	1	5
Jurong Spring														Jurong GRC (5)				0	3
Jurong Spring–Gek Poh																	West Coast–Jurong West GRC (5)	0	1
Kaki Bukit							SMC		Eunos GRC (3)	Eunos GRC (4)	East Coast GRC (6)		Marine Parade GRC (6)	Aljunied GRC (5)				2	9
Kallang			SMC							Jalan Besar GRC (4)								8	1
Kampong Chai Chee				SMC					Bedok GRC (3)	Bedok GRC (4)	East Coast GRC (6)		East Coast GRC (5)		East Coast GRC (4)	East Coast GRC (5)		5	9
Kampong Glam			SMC							Kampong Glam GRC (4)	SMC	Jalan Besar GRC (5)		Moulmein–Kallang GRC (4)	Jalan Besar GRC (4)			9	7
Kampong Kapor		SMC																5	0
Kampong Kembangan			SMC						Aljunied GRC (3)	Aljunied GRC (4)	Aljunied GRC (5)							7	3
Kampong Ubi				SMC					Aljunied GRC (3)	Aljunied GRC (4)	Marine Parade GRC (6)							5	2
Kampong Ubi–Kembangan													Marine Parade GRC (6)					0	1
Katong	SMC			SMC														6	0
Keat Hong												Hong Kah GRC (5)		Chua Chu Kang GRC (5)	Chua Chu Kang GRC (4)			0	6
Kebun Baru							SMC			Ang Mo Kio GRC (4)	Ang Mo Kio GRC (5)	Ang Mo Kio GRC (6)			Nee Soon GRC (5)	SMC		5	6
Kembangan																	Marine Parade–Braddell Heights GRC (5)	0	1
Kembangan–Chai Chee														Marine Parade GRC (5)				0	3
Kembangan–Punggol												Aljunied GRC (5)						0	1
Keppel	SMC																	1	0
Khe Bong						SMC												3	0
Kim Keat					SMC					Toa Payoh GRC (4)								5	1
Kim Seng					SMC					Kampong Glam GRC (4)	Kreta Ayer–Tanglin GRC (4)							5	2
Kolam Ayer						SMC			Jalan Besar GRC (3)	Jalan Besar GRC (4)		Jalan Besar GRC (5)		Moulmein–Kallang GRC (4)	Jalan Besar GRC (4)			3	9
Kreta Ayer			SMC								Kreta Ayer–Tanglin GRC (4)							9	1
Kreta Ayer–Kim Seng												Jalan Besar GRC (5)		Tanjong Pagar GRC (5)	Jalan Besar GRC (4)			0	6
Kuo Chuan					SMC				Toa Payoh GRC (3)	Toa Payoh GRC (4)								4	2
Leng Kee					SMC						Tanjong Pagar GRC (6)							6	1
Limbang															Marsiling–Yew Tee GRC (4)			0	3
MacPherson				SMC						Marine Parade GRC (4)	SMC			Marine Parade GRC (5)	SMC		Marine Parade–Braddell Heights GRC (5)	11	3
Marine Parade						SMC			Marine Parade GRC (3)	Marine Parade GRC (4)	Marine Parade GRC (6)			Marine Parade GRC (5)			Marine Parade-Braddell Heights GRC (5)	3	9
Marsiling											Sembawang GRC (6)			Sembawang GRC (5)	Marsiling–Yew Tee GRC (4)			0	7
Marymount																SMC		2	0
Moulmein			SMC							Kampong Glam GRC (4)	Kreta Ayer–Tanglin GRC (4)	Tanjong Pagar GRC (6)		Moulmein–Kallang GRC (4)				8	5
Moulmein–Cairnhill															Tanjong Pagar GRC (5)			0	3
Mountbatten			SMC								Marine Parade GRC (6)			SMC				13	3
Nanyang											Hong Kah GRC (5)			Chua Chu Kang GRC (5)	Chua Chu Kang GRC (4)	West Coast GRC (5)	West Coast–Jurong West GRC (5)	0	7
Naval Base																	Sembawang GRC (5)	0	1
Nee Soon			SMC											Nee Soon GRC (5)				7	0
Nee Soon Central									SMC					Nee Soon GRC (5)				5	4
Nee Soon East									Sembawang GRC (3)	Sembawang GRC (4)	Sembawang GRC (6)	SMC		Nee Soon GRC (5)				2	7
Nee Soon Link																Nee Soon GRC (5)		0	2
Nee Soon South									SMC		Ang Mo Kio GRC (5)	Ang Mo Kio GRC (6)		Nee Soon GRC (5)				2	7
Pasir Panjang		SMC							Pasir Panjang GRC (3)		West Coast GRC (4)							8	2
Pasir Ris										Eunos GRC (4)	Pasir Ris GRC (4)							0	1
Pasir Ris Central											Pasir Ris GRC (4)					Pasir Ris–Punggol GRC (5)	Pasir Ris–Changi GRC (4)	0	3
Pasir Ris East												Pasir Ris–Punggol GRC (5)	Pasir Ris–Punggol GRC (6)			Pasir Ris–Punggol GRC (5)	Pasir Ris–Changi GRC (4)	0	6
Pasir Ris Elias											Pasir Ris GRC (4)							0	1
Pasir Ris Loyang											Pasir Ris GRC (4)							0	1
Pasir Ris South											Pasir Ris GRC (4)							0	1
Pasir Ris West												Pasir Ris–Punggol GRC (5)	Pasir Ris–Punggol GRC (6)			Pasir Ris–Punggol GRC (5)	Pasir Ris–Changi GRC (4)	0	6
Paya Lebar		SMC								Aljunied GRC (4)	Aljunied GRC (5)							9	8
Pioneer												West Coast GRC (5)		SMC				4	2
Potong Pasir				SMC														14	0
Punggol			SMC							Cheng San GRC (4)							Punggol GRC (4)	8	1
Punggol Central											Cheng San GRC (5)	Pasir Ris–Punggol GRC (5)	Pasir Ris–Punggol GRC (6)					0	4
Punggol Coast															Pasir Ris–Punggol GRC (6)	Pasir Ris–Punggol GRC (5)	Punggol GRC (4)	0	3
Punggol East											Cheng San GRC (5)		Pasir Ris–Punggol GRC (6)	SMC				2	2
Punggol North												Pasir Ris–Punggol GRC (5)	Pasir Ris–Punggol GRC (6)				Punggol GRC (4)	0	5
Punggol Shore																Pasir Ris–Punggol GRC (5)	Punggol GRC (4)	0	2
Punggol South											Cheng San GRC (5)	Pasir Ris–Punggol GRC (5)	Pasir Ris–Punggol GRC (6)					0	4
Punggol West														Pasir Ris–Punggol GRC (6)		SMC	Punggol GRC (4)	1	3
Punggol–Tampines		SMC																1	0
Queenstown		SMC							Brickworks GRC (3)	Brickworks GRC (4)	Tanjong Pagar GRC (6)			Tanjong Pagar GRC (5)			SMC	9	8
Radin Mas						SMC			Tiong Bahru GRC (3)	Tanjong Pagar GRC (4)	Tanjong Pagar GRC (6)			SMC				7	5
River Valley			SMC															7	0
Rivervale																Sengkang GRC (4) (Note: Identified in the People's Association grassroots branch as Sengkang East.)		0	2
Rochore	SMC																	9	0
Seletar	SMC																	2	0
Seletar–Serangoon																	Ang Mo Kio GRC (5)	0	1
Sembawang		SMC							Sembawang GRC (3)	Sembawang GRC (4)	Sembawang GRC (6)			Sembawang GRC (5)		Sembawang GRC (5)		8	7
Sembawang Central																Sembawang GRC (5)		0	2
Sembawang West																Sembawang GRC (5)	SMC	1	1
Sengkang Central															Pasir Ris–Punggol GRC (6)			0	1
Sengkang South															Ang Mo Kio GRC (6)			0	1
Sengkang West													Ang Mo Kio GRC (6)	SMC				2	1
Sepoy Lines			SMC															4	0
Serangoon		SMC									Marine Parade GRC (6)		Aljunied GRC (5)					1	7
Serangoon Gardens			SMC							Thomson GRC (4)								8	1
Siglap			SMC							Bedok GRC (4)	East Coast GRC (6)		East Coast GRC (5)		East Coast GRC (4)	East Coast GRC (5)		8	7
Southern Islands		SMC																3	0
Stamford		SMC																5	0
Taman Jurong												Jurong GRC (5)					West Coast–Jurong West GRC (5)	0	6
Tampines			SMC						Tampines GRC (3)	Tampines GRC (4)		Tampines GRC (5)						7	0
Tampines Boulevard																	Tampines GRC (5)	0	1
Tampines Central											Tampines GRC (4)	Tampines GRC (5)						0	7
Tampines Changkat												Tampines GRC (5)					SMC	1	5
Tampines East									Tampines GRC (3)	Tampines GRC (4)		Tampines GRC (5)						0	9
Tampines North									Eunos GRC (3)	Eunos GRC (4)		Tampines GRC (5)						0	8
Tampines West									Tampines GRC (3)	Tampines GRC (4)		Tampines GRC (5)						0	9
Tanah Merah							SMC		Bedok GRC (3)									2	1
Tanglin	SMC										Kreta Ayer–Tanglin GRC (4)							11	1
Tanglin-Cairnhill												Tanjong Pagar GRC (6)		Tanjong Pagar GRC (5)				0	3
Tanjong Pagar		SMC								Tanjong Pagar GRC (4)	Tanjong Pagar GRC (6)			Tanjong Pagar GRC (5)				9	4
Tanjong Pagar–Tiong Bahru														Tanjong Pagar GRC (5)				0	4
Teck Ghee								SMC		Ang Mo Kio GRC (4)	Ang Mo Kio GRC (5)	Ang Mo Kio GRC (6)				Ang Mo Kio GRC (5)		2	8
Telok Ayer		SMC																8	0
Telok Blangah			SMC							Tanjong Pagar GRC (4)	West Coast GRC (4)	West Coast GRC (5)			West Coast GRC (4)	West Coast GRC (5)	Tanjong Pagar GRC (5)	8	8
Tengah																	Chua Chu Kang GRC (4)	0	1
Thomson			SMC							Thomson GRC (4)	Bishan–Toa Payoh GRC (5)							8	4
Thomson–Toa Payoh														Bishan–Toa Payoh GRC (5)				0	1
Tiong Bahru		SMC							Tiong Bahru GRC (3)	Tanjong Pagar GRC (4)	Tanjong Pagar GRC (6)							8	5
Toa Payoh			SMC						Toa Payoh GRC (3)	Toa Payoh GRC (4)								7	2
Toa Payoh Central											Bishan–Toa Payoh GRC (5)					Bishan–Toa Payoh GRC (4)		0	7
Toa Payoh East											Bishan–Toa Payoh GRC (5)					Bishan–Toa Payoh GRC (4)		0	6
Toa Payoh East–Novena															Bishan–Toa Payoh GRC (5)			0	1
Toa Payoh West–Balestier															Bishan–Toa Payoh GRC (5)			0	1
Toa Payoh West–Thomson																Bishan–Toa Payoh GRC (4)		0	2
Ulu Bedok		SMC																1	0
Ulu Pandan			SMC								Bukit Timah GRC (5)	Holland–Bukit Panjang GRC (5)	Holland–Bukit Timah GRC (5)	Holland–Bukit Timah GRC (4)				9	7
Upper Serangoon			SMC															5	0
West Coast							SMC		Pasir Panjang GRC (3)	Brickworks GRC (4)	West Coast GRC (4)	West Coast GRC (5)	West Coast GRC (5)	West Coast GRC (5)	West Coast GRC (4)	West Coast GRC (5)	West Coast–Jurong West GRC (5) (Note: While West Coast is considered as one division for the West Coast-Jurong West GRC, the Meet-the-People Sessions for West Coast division is currently overseen by two MPs, Ayer Rajah division MP Cassandra Lee and Boon Lay division MP Desmond Lee. Either one of two MPs conduct said sessions for the West Coast division on alternating weeks.)	2	9
Whampoa		SMC		SMC							Jalan Besar GRC (4)	Jalan Besar GRC (5)		SMC	Jalan Besar GRC (4)			7	6
Woodgrove														Sembawang GRC (5)	Marsiling–Yew Tee GRC (4)			0	4
Woodlands											Sembawang GRC (6)			Sembawang GRC (5)				0	7
Yew Tee											Hong Kah GRC (5)			Chua Chu Kang GRC (5)	Marsiling–Yew Tee GRC (4)			0	7
Yio Chu Kang							SMC			Ang Mo Kio GRC (4)	Ang Mo Kio GRC (5)	Ang Mo Kio GRC (6)	SMC	Ang Mo Kio GRC (6)		SMC		6	5
Yuhua								SMC			Bukit Timah GRC (5)	Jurong GRC (5)		SMC			Jurong East–Bukit Batok GRC (5)	6	4
Zhenghua												Holland–Bukit Panjang GRC (5)	Holland–Bukit Timah GRC (5)	Holland–Bukit Timah GRC (4)				0	6

== List of Group Representation Constituencies ==
Colour key

	A Group Representation Constituency was previously existed as a Single Member Constituency
	Currently existed as a Group Representation Constituency with a namesake division
	A Group Representation Constituency that was defunct with name of division appeared in another Group Representation Constituency
	Currently existed as a Group Representation Constituency
	Division that was in a Group Representation Constituency but has no nominal MPs
	Italics- A Group Representation Constituency using a double-barrelled or as a whole GRC naming
(number)	Number of seats in a GRC is indicated in parenthesis.
^{M/IO}	Minority candidate requirement indicated as superscript. (^{M} indicates a Malay/Muslim candidate requirement, ^{IO} indicates an Indian/Other minority candidate requirement)

List of Group Representation Constituencies by year
Election year	1950–79						1980–99					2000–19				2020–		Appearance
Election year	'51	'55	'59 '63	'68	'72	'76	'80	'84	'88	'91	'97	'01	'06	'11	'15	'20	'25	Appearance
Total	0	0	0	0	0	0	0	0	13	15		14		15	16	17	18	Appearance
Division																		
Aljunied			SMC						Aljunied GRC (3)^{M}	Aljunied GRC (4)^{M}	Aljunied GRC (5)^{M}	Aljunied GRC (5)^{M}						9
Ang Mo Kio						SMC				Ang Mo Kio GRC (4)^{M}	Ang Mo Kio GRC (5)^{IO}	Ang Mo Kio GRC (6)^{IO}				Ang Mo Kio GRC (5)^{IO}		8
Bedok						SMC			Bedok GRC (3)^{IO}	Bedok GRC (4)^{IO}	East Coast GRC (5)	East Coast GRC (6)	East Coast GRC (5)		East Coast GRC (4)	East Coast GRC (5)		2
Bishan–Toa Payoh											Bishan–Toa Payoh GRC (5)^{M}					Bishan–Toa Payoh GRC (4)^{M}		7
Brickworks						SMC			Brickworks GRC (3)^{M}	Brickworks GRC (4)^{M}								2
Bukit Timah	SMC										Bukit Timah GRC (5)^{IO}	SMC	Holland–Bukit Timah GRC (5)	Holland–Bukit Timah GRC (4)				1
Cheng San							SMC		Cheng San GRC (3)^{IO}	Cheng San GRC (4)^{IO}	Cheng San GRC (5)^{M}	Ang Mo Kio GRC (6)					Ang Mo Kio GRC (5)	3
Chua Chu Kang			SMC											Chua Chu Kang GRC (5)^{M}	Chua Chu Kang GRC (4)^{M}			4
East Coast											East Coast GRC (5)^{M}	East Coast GRC (6)^{M}	East Coast GRC (5)^{M}		East Coast GRC (4)^{M}	East Coast GRC (5)^{M}		7
Eunos								SMC	Eunos GRC (3)^{M}	Eunos GRC (4)^{M}	Aljunied GRC (5)							2
Holland–Bukit Panjang												Holland–Bukit Panjang GRC (5)^{IO}						1
Holland–Bukit Timah													Holland–Bukit Timah GRC (5)^{IO}	Holland–Bukit Timah GRC (4)^{IO}				5
Hong Kah								SMC	Hong Kah GRC (3)^{M}	Hong Kah GRC (4)^{M}	Hong Kah GRC (5)^{M}							5
Jalan Besar			SMC						Jalan Besar GRC (3)^{M}	Jalan Besar GRC (4)^{M}		Jalan Besar GRC (5)^{M}		Moulmein–Kallang GRC (4)	Jalan Besar GRC (4)^{M}			8
Jurong			SMC								Bukit Timah GRC (5)^{M}	Jurong GRC (5)^{M}		Jurong GRC (5)^{IO}				5
Jurong East-Bukit Batok																	Jurong East–Bukit Batok GRC (5)^{IO}	1
Kampong Glam			SMC							Kampong Glam GRC (4)^{IO}	SMC	Jalan Besar GRC (5)		Moulmein–Kallang GRC (4)	Jalan Besar GRC (4)			1
Kreta Ayer–Tanglin											Kreta Ayer–Tanglin GRC (4)^{IO}							1
Marine Parade						SMC			Marine Parade GRC (3)^{M}	Marine Parade GRC (4)^{M}	Marine Parade GRC (6)^{M}			Marine Parade GRC (5)^{M}			Marine Parade–Braddell Heights GRC (5)	8
Marine Parade–Braddell Heights																	Marine Parade–Braddell Heights GRC (5)^{M}	1
Marsiling–Yew Tee															Marsiling–Yew Tee GRC (4)^{M}			3
Moulmein–Kallang														Moulmein–Kallang GRC (4)^{M}				1
Nee Soon			SMC											Nee Soon GRC (5)^{IO}				4
Pasir Panjang		SMC							Pasir Panjang GRC (3)^{M}		West Coast GRC (4)							1
Pasir Ris										Eunos GRC (4)	Pasir Ris GRC (4)^{M}							1
Pasir Ris–Changi																	Pasir Ris–Changi GRC (4)^{M}	1
Pasir Ris–Punggol												Pasir Ris–Punggol GRC (5)^{M}	Pasir Ris–Punggol GRC (6)^{M}			Pasir Ris–Punggol GRC (5)^{M}		5
Punggol			SMC							Cheng San GRC (4)							Punggol GRC (4)^{IO}	1
Sembawang		SMC							Sembawang GRC (3)^{IO}	Sembawang GRC (4)^{IO}	Sembawang GRC (6)^{IO}			Sembawang GRC (5)^{M}		Sembawang GRC (5)^{M}		9
Sengkang																Sengkang GRC (4)^{M}		2
Tampines			SMC						Tampines GRC (3)^{M}	Tampines GRC (4)^{M}		Tampines GRC (5)^{M}						9
Tanjong Pagar		SMC								Tanjong Pagar GRC (4)^{IO}	Tanjong Pagar GRC (6)^{IO}			Tanjong Pagar GRC (5)^{IO}				8
Thomson			SMC							Thomson GRC (4)^{M}	Bishan-Toa Payoh GRC (5)							1
Tiong Bahru		SMC							Tiong Bahru GRC (3)^{IO}	Tanjong Pagar GRC (4)	Tanjong Pagar GRC (6)							1
Toa Payoh			SMC						Toa Payoh GRC (3)^{IO}	Toa Payoh GRC (4)^{IO}								2
West Coast							SMC		Pasir Panjang GRC (3)	Brickworks GRC (4)	West Coast GRC (4)^{IO}	West Coast GRC (5)^{IO}	West Coast GRC (5)^{IO}	West Coast GRC (5)^{IO}	West Coast GRC (4)^{IO}	West Coast GRC (5)^{IO}	West Coast-Jurong West GRC (5)	6
West Coast–Jurong West																	West Coast–Jurong West GRC (5)^{IO}	1
