= List of past Singaporean electoral divisions =

This is a list of past arrangements of electoral divisions in Singapore. Each division sends at least one member to the Parliament of Singapore.

	Number of seats
List of Singaporean electoral divisions (1948–51)	6
List of Singaporean electoral divisions (1951–55)	9
List of Singaporean electoral divisions (1955–59)	25
List of Singaporean electoral divisions (1959–63)	51
List of Singaporean electoral divisions (1963–68)	51
List of Singaporean electoral divisions (1968–72)	58
List of Singaporean electoral divisions (1972–76)	65
List of Singaporean electoral divisions (1976–80)	69
List of Singaporean electoral divisions (1980–84)	75
List of Singaporean electoral divisions (1984–88)	79
List of Singaporean electoral divisions (1988–91)	81
List of Singaporean electoral divisions (1991–97)	81
List of Singaporean electoral divisions (1997–2001)	83
List of Singaporean electoral divisions (2001–06)	84
List of Singaporean electoral divisions (2006–11)	84
List of Singaporean electoral divisions (2011–15)	87
List of Singaporean electoral divisions (2015–2020)	89
List of Singaporean electoral divisions (2020–2025)	93
List of Singaporean electoral divisions (2025–present)	97

== See also ==
- List of defunct electoral divisions of Singapore
- List of electoral divisions and wards in Singapore
