= List of Singaporean electoral divisions (1948–1951) =

Electoral divisions in Singapore from 1948 to 1951

Map of Singapore's constituencies with results of the 1948 election.

This is a list of Singapore’s electoral divisions which were existence during the period of 1948 to 1951, demarcated for the purpose of conducting the first election in Singapore in 1948. There were only four electoral districts, of which two are for two seats for a total of six elected members into the Legislative Council.

Constituency	Seats	Electorate (1948)
Municipal North-East	2	8,691
Municipal South-West	2	8,800
Rural East	1	2,092
Rural West	1	2,774
