= List of Singaporean electoral divisions (1988–1991) =

The following is a list of Singaporean electoral divisions from 1988 to 1991 that served as constituencies that elected Members of Parliament (MPs) to the 7th Parliament of Singapore in the 1988 Singaporean general elections. The number of seats in Parliament had increased by 2 to 81 seats.

On 1 June 1988, the group representative constituency (GRC) scheme was introduced, in which teams of 3 or 4 candidates from a constituency compete to be elected into Parliament. This resulted in a reduced number of constituencies from the previous general election. The aim of the GRC scheme was to allow minorities to be elected and represented in Parliament. It was later amended to teams of 4 to 6 candidates in the 1997 general elections before reducing it to 4 to 5 candidates in 2020.

== Group Representation Constituencies ==
Constituency	Seats	Minority representation	Electorate	Wards
Aljunied GRC	3	Malay	65,351	Aljunied
Aljunied GRC	3	Malay	65,351	Kampong Kembangan
Aljunied GRC	3	Malay	65,351	Kampong Ubi
Bedok GRC	3	Indian or other	54,969	Bedok
Bedok GRC	3	Indian or other	54,969	Kampong Chai Chee
Bedok GRC	3	Indian or other	54,969	Tanah Merah
Brickworks GRC	3	Malay	43,117	Alexandra
Brickworks GRC	3	Malay	43,117	Brickworks
Brickworks GRC	3	Malay	43,117	Queenstown
Cheng San GRC	3	Indian or other	59,186	Cheng San
Cheng San GRC	3	Indian or other	59,186	Chong Boon
Cheng San GRC	3	Indian or other	59,186	Jalan Kayu
Eunos GRC	3	Malay	75,723	Eunos
Eunos GRC	3	Malay	75,723	Kaki Bukit
Eunos GRC	3	Malay	75,723	Tampines North
Hong Kah GRC	3	Malay	65,538	Hong Kah Central
Hong Kah GRC	3	Malay	65,538	Hong Kah North
Hong Kah GRC	3	Malay	65,538	Hong Kah South
Jalan Besar GRC	3	Malay	54,941	Geylang West
Jalan Besar GRC	3	Malay	54,941	Jalan Besar
Jalan Besar GRC	3	Malay	54,941	Kolam Ayer
Marine Parade GRC	3	Malay	62,385	Geylang Serai
Marine Parade GRC	3	Malay	62,385	Joo Chiat
Marine Parade GRC	3	Malay	62,385	Marine Parade
Pasir Panjang GRC	3	Malay	66,600	Clementi
Pasir Panjang GRC	3	Malay	66,600	Pasir Panjang
Pasir Panjang GRC	3	Malay	66,600	West Coast
Sembawang GRC	3	Indian or other	55,633	Chong Pang
Sembawang GRC	3	Indian or other	55,633	Nee Soon East
Sembawang GRC	3	Indian or other	55,633	Sembawang
Tampines GRC	3	Malay	65,148	Changkat
Tampines GRC	3	Malay	65,148	Tampines East
Tampines GRC	3	Malay	65,148	Tampines West
Tiong Bahru GRC	3	Indian or other	58,898	Henderson
Tiong Bahru GRC	3	Indian or other	58,898	Radin Mas
Tiong Bahru GRC	3	Indian or other	58,898	Tiong Bahru
Toa Payoh GRC	3	Indian or other	54,620	Boon Teck
Toa Payoh GRC	3	Indian or other	54,620	Kuo Chuan
Toa Payoh GRC	3	Indian or other	54,620	Toa Payoh

== Single Member Constituencies ==
Constituency	Seats	Electorate
Ang Mo Kio SMC	1	21,744
Ayer Rajah SMC	1	22,532
Boon Lay SMC	1	16,646
Braddell Heights SMC	1	27,019
Bukit Batok SMC	1	24,138
Bukit Gombak SMC	1	25,221
Bukit Merah SMC	1	14,723
Bukit Panjang SMC	1	33,824
Bukit Timah SMC	1	20,222
Buona Vista SMC	1	15,850
Cairnhill SMC	1	23,197
Changi SMC	1	17,145
Chua Chu Kang SMC	1	19,628
Fengshan SMC	1	17,389
Hougang SMC	1	21,703
Jurong SMC	1	21,420
Kallang SMC	1	21,245
Kampong Glam SMC	1	21,773
Kebun Baru SMC	1	22,515
Kim Keat SMC	1	15,850
Kim Seng SMC	1	18,474
Kreta Ayer SMC	1	21,470
Leng Kee SMC	1	21,964
MacPherson SMC	1	17,063
Moulmein SMC	1	19,229
Mountbatten SMC	1	17,747
Nee Soon Central SMC	1	24,403
Nee Soon South SMC	1	22,542
Paya Lebar SMC	1	25,076
Potong Pasir SMC	1	19,852
Punggol SMC	1	31,577
Serangoon Gardens SMC	1	24,831
Siglap SMC	1	18,650
Tanglin SMC	1	17,497
Tanjong Pagar SMC	1	19,041
Teck Ghee SMC	1	15,510
Telok Blangah SMC	1	18,609
Thomson SMC	1	34,886
Ulu Pandan SMC	1	23,587
Whampoa SMC	1	13,819
Yio Chu Kang SMC	1	15,991
Yuhua SMC	1	19,190
