= Rochore Constituency =

Former constituency in Singapore (1951–1988)

Rochore
- Former constituency for the Parliament of Singapore
- Electorate: 14,164 (1984)

Former constituency
- Created: 1951
- Abolished: 1988
- Seats: 1
- Created from: Municipal North–East; Municipal South–West
- Replaced by: Kampong Glam SMC

Rochore Constituency was a constituency in Singapore that existed from 1951 until 1988. The constituency was represented in the Legislative Council from 1951 until 1955, in the Legislative Assembly from 1955 until 1965, and in Parliament from 1965 until 1988. It elected one member of Parliament.

== History ==
The constituency was formed in 1951 by merging parts of the Municipal North–East Constituency and the Municipal South-West Constituency. The first election was won by Caralapati Raghaviah Dasaratha Raj of the Labour Party.

In 1955, parts of the constituency were carved out to form Cairnhill, Kampong Kapor and Stamford constituencies. The constituency was won by Tan Theng Chiang of the Labour Front.

In 1959, parts of the constituency were separated to form Crawford and Kampong Glam constituencies. It was then won by Toh Chin Chye of the People's Action Party. Toh will remain the Member of Parliament of the constituency till it merged into Kampong Glam Single Member Constituency in 1988.

In 1988, the constituency was dissolved following the establishment of Group representation constituency (GRC) and Single Member Constituency (SMC).

== Member of Parliament ==
Election	Member	Party
Formation
Legislative Council of Singapore
1951	Caralapati Raghaviah Dasaratha Raj	LP
Legislative Assembly of Singapore
1955	Tan Theng Chiang	LF
1959	Toh Chin Chye	PAP
1963	Toh Chin Chye	PAP
Parliament of Singapore
1968	Toh Chin Chye	PAP
1972	Toh Chin Chye	PAP
1976	Toh Chin Chye	PAP
1980	Toh Chin Chye	PAP
1984	Toh Chin Chye	PAP
Constituency abolished (1988)

== Electoral results ==
Note: The Elections Department does not include rejected votes when calculating the vote shares of candidates. Hence, all candidates' vote shares will total to 100% at any given election (may not appear so in multi-way contests due to rounding).

=== Elections in 1950s ===
General Election 1951: Rochore
Party	Candidate	Votes	%	±%
Labour Party	Caralapati Raghaviah Dasaratha Raj	1,433	43.1	
Independent	Mohamed Javad Namazie	1,215	36.6	
Independent	Pandarapillai Thillai Nathan	675	20.3	
Majority		218	6.5	
Turnout		3,380	45.1	
Labour Party win (new seat)				

General Election 1955: Rochore
Party	Candidate	Votes	%	±%
LF	Tan Theng Chiang	2,929	46.25	
DP	Ong Eng Lian	1,897	29.95	
PP	Soh Ghee Soon	1,507	23.80	
Majority		1,032	16.30	
Turnout		6,414	53.1	▲8
LF gain from Labour Party		Swing		

General Election 1959: Rochore
Party	Candidate	Votes	%	±%
PAP	Toh Chin Chye	7,995	71.76	
SPA	Konnolil C. Thomas	2,212	19.85	
LSP	Tan Soo Wan	934	8.39	
Majority		5,121	51.91	
Turnout		11,287	90.8	▲37.7
PAP gain from LF		Swing		

=== Elections in 1960s ===
General Election 1968: Rochore
Party	Candidate	Votes	%	±%
PAP	Toh Chin Chye	Walkover		
Majority				
Turnout		12,222		
PAP hold		Swing		

General Election 1963: Rochore
Party	Candidate	Votes	%	±%
PAP	Toh Chin Chye	5,015	45.56	▼26.20
BS	Lee Siew Choh	4,926	44.75	
UPP	Pan Tiek Tai	1,067	9.69	
Majority		89	0.81	▼51.10
Turnout		11,117	95.0	▲4.2
PAP hold		Swing	▼26.20	

=== Elections in 1970s ===
General Election 1972: Rochore
Party	Candidate	Votes	%	±%
PAP	Toh Chin Chye	6,218	60.40	
BS	Lee Siew Choh	4,076	39.60	
Majority		2,142	20.80	
Turnout		10,552	91.1	
PAP hold		Swing		

General Election 1976: Rochore
Party	Candidate	Votes	%	±%
PAP	Toh Chin Chye	9,053	65.50	▲5.10
BS	Lee Siew Choh	4,768	34.50	▼5.10
Majority		4,285	31.00	▲10.20
Turnout		14,172	91.9	▲0.8
PAP hold		Swing	▲5.10	

=== Elections in 1980s ===
General Election 1980: Rochore
Party	Candidate	Votes	%	±%
PAP	Toh Chin Chye	Walkover		
Majority				
Turnout		14,705		
PAP hold		Swing		

General Election 1984: Rochore
Party	Candidate	Votes	%	±%
PAP	Toh Chin Chye	Walkover		
Majority				
Turnout		14,164		
PAP hold		Swing		

== Historical maps ==
1955 General Election
