= Tan Chye Cheng =

Singaporean politician (1911–1991)

- 陳才清
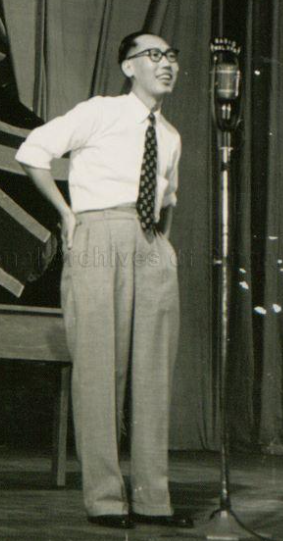
- Tan in 1951

Member of the Legislative Council for Municipal South-West Constituency
- In office 1 April 1948 – 16 February 1951 Serving with Nazir Ahmad Mallal
- Governor: Franklin Gimson
- Preceded by: Constituency established
- Succeeded by: Constituency abolished
- Majority: 1948: 4,125 (42.29%)

Member of the Legislative Council for Tanglin Constituency
- In office 17 April 1951 – 5 February 1955
- Governor: Franklin Gimson; John Nicoll
- Preceded by: Constituency established
- Succeeded by: John Ede
- Majority: 1951: 1,416 (80.14%)

Personal details
- Born: 1911 Singapore, Straits Settlements
- Died: 6 March 1991 (age 80) Singapore
- Party: Progressive Party
- Children: Margaret Leng Tan (daughter)

Tan Chye Cheng (traditional Chinese: 陳才清; simplified Chinese: 陈才清; pinyin: Chén Cái Qīng; 1911 – 6 March 1991), also known as C. C. Tan, was a Singaporean lawyer and politician.

== Biography ==
Born in Singapore, Tan was the only child of Tan Guan Chua, a member of the Chinese Advisory Board and the Singapore Chinese Chamber of Commerce committee. He was educated at the St. Joseph's Institution school, leaving in 1928. He won a scholarship to attend St Joseph's Academy in London, where he became friends with Ong Hock Thye.

Tan was admitted to the Middle Temple in 1928, passing his final exam in 1931. He had to wait until turning 21 in 1932 before being called to the Bar. He returned to Singapore and was called to the Bar in 1933. He initially worked at Aubrey Davies & Company, later moving to Rodyk & Davidson, where he remained until the start of World War II. In 1939 Tan married Joyce Lim Chin Lien in Singapore. They moved to India during World War II, returning to the island after the end of the war. His daughter, Margaret Leng Tan, became a musician.

After returning from India, Tan became involved in politics. He was appointed to the Advisory Council in 1946, serving until the following year, when he was amongst the founders of the Progressive Party in August 1947 and, despite not being a good public speaker, became its first president. In the first general elections in 1948, Tan was elected in the Municipal South-West constituency with 42% of the vote, beating Nazir Ahmad Mallal by 69 votes. The elections saw the PP win three of the six elected seats.

In the 1951 elections Tan ran in the Tanglin constituency, receiving 80% of the vote against his Labour Party rival, with the PP winning six of the nine elected seats. In 1954 he was part of the nine-man panel led by George William Rendel that reviewed the territory's constitution, leading to the promulgation of a new one. However, Tan lost his seat in the 1955 elections; he ran in the Cairnhill constituency against Labour Front leader David Marshall, with Marshall receiving 48% of the vote to Tan's 36%. The PP won only four of the 25 seats, with the Labour Front winning 10. As a result, Marshall became the island's first Chief Minister.

Tan had been one of the founders of the Tan, Rajah & Cheah law firm in 1947, and later became president of the Bar Committee and first president of the Law Society. He served as president of the Singapore Olympic Sports Council from 1951 until 1962, and as chairman of The Straits Times press between 1974 and 1982.

He died of heart failure at age 80 on 6 March 1991.

== Legacy ==
In 2003 the Law Society created the C.C. Tan award, which is awarded to a member exemplifying the virtues of "honesty, fair play and personal integrity".
