= List of Singaporean electoral divisions (1991–1997) =

The following is a list of Singaporean electoral divisions from 1991 to 1997 that served as constituencies that elected Members of Parliament (MPs) to the 8th Parliament of Singapore in the 1991 Singaporean general elections. The total number of seats in Parliament remains unchanged since the last general election.

== Group Representation Constituencies ==
Constituency	Seats	Minority representation	Electorate	Polling Districts	Wards
Aljunied GRC	4	Malay	94,490	24	Aljunied
Aljunied GRC	4	Malay	94,490	24	Kampong Kembangan
Aljunied GRC	4	Malay	94,490	24	Kampong Ubi
Aljunied GRC	4	Malay	94,490	24	Paya Lebar
Ang Mo Kio GRC	4	Indian or other	74,004	16	Ang Mo Kio
Ang Mo Kio GRC	4	Indian or other	74,004	16	Kebun Baru
Ang Mo Kio GRC	4	Indian or other	74,004	16	Teck Ghee
Ang Mo Kio GRC	4	Indian or other	74,004	16	Yio Chu Kang
Bedok GRC	4	Indian or other	86,246	19	Bedok
Bedok GRC	4	Indian or other	86,246	19	Fengshan
Bedok GRC	4	Indian or other	86,246	19	Kampong Chai Chee
Bedok GRC	4	Indian or other	86,246	19	Siglap
Brickworks GRC	4	Malay	101,440	24	Brickworks
Brickworks GRC	4	Malay	101,440	24	Clementi
Brickworks GRC	4	Malay	101,440	24	Queenstown
Brickworks GRC	4	Malay	101,440	24	West Coast
Cheng San GRC	4	Indian or other	92,979	18	Cheng San
Cheng San GRC	4	Indian or other	92,979	18	Chong Boon
Cheng San GRC	4	Indian or other	92,979	18	Jalan Kayu
Cheng San GRC	4	Indian or other	92,979	18	Punggol
Eunos GRC	4	Malay	92,728	27	Eunos
Eunos GRC	4	Malay	92,728	27	Kaki Bukit
Eunos GRC	4	Malay	92,728	27	Pasir Ris
Eunos GRC	4	Malay	92,728	27	Tampines North
Hong Kah GRC	4	Malay	64,712	11	Hong Kah East
Hong Kah GRC	4	Malay	64,712	11	Hong Kah North
Hong Kah GRC	4	Malay	64,712	11	Hong Kah South
Hong Kah GRC	4	Malay	64,712	11	Hong Kah West
Jalan Besar GRC	4	Malay	82,615	19	Geylang West
Jalan Besar GRC	4	Malay	82,615	19	Jalan Besar
Jalan Besar GRC	4	Malay	82,615	19	Kallang
Jalan Besar GRC	4	Malay	82,615	19	Kolam Ayer
Kampong Glam GRC	4	Indian or other	73,317	18	Cairnhill
Kampong Glam GRC	4	Indian or other	73,317	18	Kampong Glam
Kampong Glam GRC	4	Indian or other	73,317	18	Kim Seng
Kampong Glam GRC	4	Indian or other	73,317	18	Moulmein
Marine Parade GRC	4	Malay	74,032	17	Geylang Serai
Marine Parade GRC	4	Malay	74,032	17	Joo Chiat
Marine Parade GRC	4	Malay	74,032	17	MacPherson
Marine Parade GRC	4	Malay	74,032	17	Marine Parade
Sembawang GRC	4	Indian or other	117,951	29	Bukit Panjang
Sembawang GRC	4	Indian or other	117,951	29	Chong Pang
Sembawang GRC	4	Indian or other	117,951	29	Nee Soon East
Sembawang GRC	4	Indian or other	117,951	29	Sembawang
Tampines GRC	4	Malay	69,801	16	Changkat
Tampines GRC	4	Malay	69,801	16	Changkat South
Tampines GRC	4	Malay	69,801	16	Tampines East
Tampines GRC	4	Malay	69,801	16	Tampines West
Tanjong Pagar GRC	4	Indian or other	86,944	19	Radin Mas
Tanjong Pagar GRC	4	Indian or other	86,944	19	Tanjong Pagar
Tanjong Pagar GRC	4	Indian or other	86,944	19	Telok Blangah
Tanjong Pagar GRC	4	Indian or other	86,944	19	Tiong Bahru
Thomson GRC	4	Malay	68,294	17	Bishan East
Thomson GRC	4	Malay	68,294	17	Bishan North
Thomson GRC	4	Malay	68,294	17	Serangoon Gardens
Thomson GRC	4	Malay	68,294	17	Thomson
Toa Payoh GRC	4	Indian or other	63,591	10	Boon Teck
Toa Payoh GRC	4	Indian or other	63,591	10	Kim Keat
Toa Payoh GRC	4	Indian or other	63,591	10	Kuo Chuan
Toa Payoh GRC	4	Indian or other	63,591	10	Toa Payoh

== Single Member Constituencies ==
Constituency	Seats	Electorate	Polling Districts
Ayer Rajah SMC	1	21,887	3
Boon Lay SMC	1	15,007	4
Braddell Heights SMC	1	27,444	5
Bukit Batok SMC	1	24,908	4
Bukit Gombak SMC	1	24,961	6
Bukit Merah SMC	1	11,998	3
Bukit Timah SMC	1	24,512	5
Buona Vista SMC	1	14,596	3
Changi SMC	1	24,886	9
Chua Chu Kang SMC	1	22,797	16
Hougang SMC	1	21,476	4
Jurong SMC	1	31,246	9
Kreta Ayer SMC	1	17,310	4
Leng Kee SMC	1	19,027	4
Mountbatten SMC	1	15,497	3
Nee Soon Central SMC	1	26,806	5
Nee Soon South SMC	1	27,722	6
Potong Pasir SMC	1	19,263	3
Tanglin SMC	1	16,801	6
Ulu Pandan SMC	1	22,299	3
Yuhua SMC	1	18,797	3
