= List of Singaporean electoral divisions (1997–2001) =

The following is a list of Singaporean electoral divisions from 1997 to 2001 that served as constituencies that elected Members of Parliament (MPs) to the 9th Parliament of Singapore in the 1997 Singaporean general elections. The total number of seats in Parliament had increased by two to 83 since the last general election.

The number of members in a team representing a group representative constituency (GRC) was increased from four to six. This reduced the total number of electoral divisions to 24.

== Group Representation Constituencies ==
Constituency	Seats	Minority representation	Electorate (1997)	Polling Districts (1997)	Polling Districts (1999)	Wards
Aljunied GRC	5	Malay	103,466	20	24	Aljunied
Aljunied GRC	5	Malay	103,466	20	24	Changi–Simei
Aljunied GRC	5	Malay	103,466	20	24	Eunos
Aljunied GRC	5	Malay	103,466	20	24	Kampong Kembangan
Aljunied GRC	5	Malay	103,466	20	24	Paya Lebar
Ang Mo Kio GRC	5	Indian or other	125,344	27	28	Ang Mo Kio
Ang Mo Kio GRC	5	Indian or other	125,344	27	28	Kebun Baru
Ang Mo Kio GRC	5	Indian or other	125,344	27	28	Nee Soon South
Ang Mo Kio GRC	5	Indian or other	125,344	27	28	Teck Ghee
Ang Mo Kio GRC	5	Indian or other	125,344	27	28	Yio Chu Kang
Bishan–Toa Payoh GRC	5	Indian or other	122,256	20	27	Bishan–Toa Payoh North
Bishan–Toa Payoh GRC	5	Indian or other	122,256	20	27	Bishan East
Bishan–Toa Payoh GRC	5	Indian or other	122,256	20	27	Thomson
Bishan–Toa Payoh GRC	5	Indian or other	122,256	20	27	Toa Payoh Central
Bishan–Toa Payoh GRC	5	Indian or other	122,256	20	27	Toa Payoh East
Bukit Timah GRC	5	Indian or other	118,248	21	29	Bukit Batok
Bukit Timah GRC	5	Indian or other	118,248	21	29	Bukit Timah
Bukit Timah GRC	5	Indian or other	118,248	21	29	Jurong
Bukit Timah GRC	5	Indian or other	118,248	21	29	Ulu Pandan
Bukit Timah GRC	5	Indian or other	118,248	21	29	Yuhua
Cheng San GRC	5	Malay	103,323	18	25	Cheng San
Cheng San GRC	5	Malay	103,323	18	25	Jalan Kayu
Cheng San GRC	5	Malay	103,323	18	25	Punggol Central
Cheng San GRC	5	Malay	103,323	18	25	Punggol East
Cheng San GRC	5	Malay	103,323	18	25	Punggol South
East Coast GRC	6	Malay	142,201	34	27	Bedok
East Coast GRC	6	Malay	142,201	34	27	Fengshan
East Coast GRC	6	Malay	142,201	34	27	Joo Chiat
East Coast GRC	6	Malay	142,201	34	27	Kaki Bukit
East Coast GRC	6	Malay	142,201	34	27	Kampong Chai Chee
East Coast GRC	6	Malay	142,201	34	27	Siglap
Hong Kah GRC	5	Malay	125,452	25	30	Hong Kah East
Hong Kah GRC	5	Malay	125,452	25	30	Hong Kah North
Hong Kah GRC	5	Malay	125,452	25	30	Hong Kah West
Hong Kah GRC	5	Malay	125,452	25	30	Nanyang
Hong Kah GRC	5	Malay	125,452	25	30	Yew Tee
Jalan Besar GRC	4	Malay	71,992	17	16	Geylang West
Jalan Besar GRC	4	Malay	71,992	17	16	Jalan Besar
Jalan Besar GRC	4	Malay	71,992	17	16	Kolam Ayer
Jalan Besar GRC	4	Malay	71,992	17	16	Whampoa
Kreta Ayer–Tanglin GRC	4	Indian or other	75,126	23	20	Kim Seng
Kreta Ayer–Tanglin GRC	4	Indian or other	75,126	23	20	Kreta Ayer
Kreta Ayer–Tanglin GRC	4	Indian or other	75,126	23	20	Moulmein
Kreta Ayer–Tanglin GRC	4	Indian or other	75,126	23	20	Tanglin
Marine Parade GRC	6	Malay	142,106	35	36	Braddell Heights
Marine Parade GRC	6	Malay	142,106	35	36	Geylang Serai
Marine Parade GRC	6	Malay	142,106	35	36	Kampong Ubi
Marine Parade GRC	6	Malay	142,106	35	36	Marine Parade
Marine Parade GRC	6	Malay	142,106	35	36	Mountbatten
Marine Parade GRC	6	Malay	142,106	35	36	Serangoon
Pasir Ris GRC	4	Malay	85,908	16	22	Pasir Ris Central
Pasir Ris GRC	4	Malay	85,908	16	22	Pasir Ris Elias
Pasir Ris GRC	4	Malay	85,908	16	22	Pasir Ris Loyang
Pasir Ris GRC	4	Malay	85,908	16	22	Pasir Ris South
Sembawang GRC	6	Indian or other	154,402	29	40	Bukit Panjang
Sembawang GRC	6	Indian or other	154,402	29	40	Chong Pang
Sembawang GRC	6	Indian or other	154,402	29	40	Marsiling
Sembawang GRC	6	Indian or other	154,402	29	40	Nee Soon East
Sembawang GRC	6	Indian or other	154,402	29	40	Sembawang
Sembawang GRC	6	Indian or other	154,402	29	40	Woodlands
Tampines GRC	4	Malay	94,476	18	25	Changkat
Tampines GRC	4	Malay	94,476	18	25	Tampines Central
Tampines GRC	4	Malay	94,476	18	25	Tampines East
Tampines GRC	4	Malay	94,476	18	25	Tampines West
Tanjong Pagar GRC	6	Indian or other	141,520	35	30	Buona Vista
Tanjong Pagar GRC	6	Indian or other	141,520	35	30	Leng Kee
Tanjong Pagar GRC	6	Indian or other	141,520	35	30	Queenstown
Tanjong Pagar GRC	6	Indian or other	141,520	35	30	Radin Mas
Tanjong Pagar GRC	6	Indian or other	141,520	35	30	Tanjong Pagar
Tanjong Pagar GRC	6	Indian or other	141,520	35	30	Tiong Bahru
West Coast GRC	4	Indian or other	74,022	16	16	Clementi
West Coast GRC	4	Indian or other	74,022	16	16	Pasir Panjang
West Coast GRC	4	Indian or other	74,022	16	16	Telok Blangah
West Coast GRC	4	Indian or other	74,022	16	16	West Coast

== Single Member Constituencies ==
Constituency	Seats	Electorate (1997)	Polling Districts (1997)	Polling Districts (1999)
Ayer Rajah SMC	1	22,025	3	4
Boon Lay SMC	1	20,014	3	3
Bukit Gombak SMC	1	24,909	6	7
Chua Chu Kang SMC	1	24,074	7	6
Hougang SMC	1	24,423	4	6
Kampong Glam SMC	1	20,044	7	4
MacPherson SMC	1	20,734	3	5
Nee Soon Central SMC	1	26,257	4	4
Potong Pasir SMC	1	18,759	3	4
