= List of Singaporean electoral divisions (2015–2020) =

The following is a list of Singaporean electoral divisions from 2015 to 2020 that served as constituencies that elected Members of Parliament (MPs) to the 13th Parliament of Singapore in the 2015 Singaporean general election.

In the elections held on 11 September 2015, there were a total of 2,462,926 voters, inclusive of overseas votes. As of 28 August 2017, the revised number of electorates were a total of 2,516,608 voters, inclusive of overseas votes.

Singapore electoral boundaries in 2015 for the 2015 General Election

== Group Representation Constituencies ==
| Constituency | Seats | Minority representation | Electorate | Polling districts | Wards |
|---|---|---|---|---|---|
| Aljunied Group Representation Constituency | 5 | Malay | 150,603 | 50 | Bedok Reservoir–Punggol |
| Aljunied Group Representation Constituency | 5 | Malay | 150,603 | 50 | Eunos |
| Aljunied Group Representation Constituency | 5 | Malay | 150,603 | 50 | Kaki Bukit |
| Aljunied Group Representation Constituency | 5 | Malay | 150,603 | 50 | Paya Lebar |
| Aljunied Group Representation Constituency | 5 | Malay | 150,603 | 50 | Serangoon |
| Ang Mo Kio Group Representation Constituency | 6 | Indian or other | 183,298 | 61 | Ang Mo Kio–Hougang |
| Ang Mo Kio Group Representation Constituency | 6 | Indian or other | 183,298 | 61 | Cheng San–Selatar |
| Ang Mo Kio Group Representation Constituency | 6 | Indian or other | 183,298 | 61 | Jalan Kayu |
| Ang Mo Kio Group Representation Constituency | 6 | Indian or other | 183,298 | 61 | Sengkang South |
| Ang Mo Kio Group Representation Constituency | 6 | Indian or other | 183,298 | 61 | Teck Ghee |
| Ang Mo Kio Group Representation Constituency | 6 | Indian or other | 183,298 | 61 | Yio Chu Kang |
| Bishan–Toa Payoh Group Representation Constituency | 5 | Malay | 126,493 | 42 | Bishan East–Thomson |
| Bishan–Toa Payoh Group Representation Constituency | 5 | Malay | 126,493 | 42 | Bishan North |
| Bishan–Toa Payoh Group Representation Constituency | 5 | Malay | 126,493 | 42 | Toa Payoh Central |
| Bishan–Toa Payoh Group Representation Constituency | 5 | Malay | 126,493 | 42 | Toa Payoh East–Novena |
| Bishan–Toa Payoh Group Representation Constituency | 5 | Malay | 126,493 | 42 | Toa Payoh West–Balestier |
| Chua Chu Kang Group Representation Constituency | 4 | Malay | 130,714 | 38 | Bukit Gombak |
| Chua Chu Kang Group Representation Constituency | 4 | Malay | 130,714 | 38 | Chua Chu Kang |
| Chua Chu Kang Group Representation Constituency | 4 | Malay | 130,714 | 38 | Keat Hong |
| Chua Chu Kang Group Representation Constituency | 4 | Malay | 130,714 | 38 | Nanyang |
| East Coast Group Representation Constituency | 4 | Malay | 96,474 | 32 | Bedok |
| East Coast Group Representation Constituency | 4 | Malay | 96,474 | 32 | Changi–Simei |
| East Coast Group Representation Constituency | 4 | Malay | 96,474 | 32 | Kampong Chai Chee |
| East Coast Group Representation Constituency | 4 | Malay | 96,474 | 32 | Siglap |
| Holland–Bukit Timah Group Representation Constituency | 4 | Indian or other | 109,527 | 38 | Bukit Timah |
| Holland–Bukit Timah Group Representation Constituency | 4 | Indian or other | 109,527 | 38 | Cashew |
| Holland–Bukit Timah Group Representation Constituency | 4 | Indian or other | 109,527 | 38 | Ulu Pandan |
| Holland–Bukit Timah Group Representation Constituency | 4 | Indian or other | 109,527 | 38 | Zhenghua |
| Jalan Besar Group Representation Constituency | 4 | Malay | 99,259 | 40 | Kampong Glam |
| Jalan Besar Group Representation Constituency | 4 | Malay | 99,259 | 40 | Kolam Ayer |
| Jalan Besar Group Representation Constituency | 4 | Malay | 99,259 | 40 | Kreta Ayer–Kim Seng |
| Jalan Besar Group Representation Constituency | 4 | Malay | 99,259 | 40 | Whampoa |
| Jurong Group Representation Constituency | 5 | Indian or other | 128,549 | 44 | Bukit Batok East |
| Jurong Group Representation Constituency | 5 | Indian or other | 128,549 | 44 | Clementi |
| Jurong Group Representation Constituency | 5 | Indian or other | 128,549 | 44 | Jurong Central |
| Jurong Group Representation Constituency | 5 | Indian or other | 128,549 | 44 | Jurong Spring |
| Jurong Group Representation Constituency | 5 | Indian or other | 128,549 | 44 | Taman Jurong |
| Marine Parade Group Representation Constituency | 5 | Malay | 143,522 | 50 | Braddell Heights |
| Marine Parade Group Representation Constituency | 5 | Malay | 143,522 | 50 | Geylang Serai |
| Marine Parade Group Representation Constituency | 5 | Malay | 143,522 | 50 | Kembangan–Chai Chee |
| Marine Parade Group Representation Constituency | 5 | Malay | 143,522 | 50 | Marine Parade |
| Marine Parade Group Representation Constituency | 5 | Malay | 143,522 | 50 | Joo Chiat |
| Marsiling–Yew Tee Group Representation Constituency | 4 | Malay | 108,460 | 35 | Limbang |
| Marsiling–Yew Tee Group Representation Constituency | 4 | Malay | 108,460 | 35 | Marsiling |
| Marsiling–Yew Tee Group Representation Constituency | 4 | Malay | 108,460 | 35 | Woodgrove |
| Marsiling–Yew Tee Group Representation Constituency | 4 | Malay | 108,460 | 35 | Yew Tee |
| Nee Soon Group Representation Constituency | 5 | Indian or other | 135,614 | 43 | Chong Pang |
| Nee Soon Group Representation Constituency | 5 | Indian or other | 135,614 | 43 | Kebun Baru |
| Nee Soon Group Representation Constituency | 5 | Indian or other | 135,614 | 43 | Nee Soon Central |
| Nee Soon Group Representation Constituency | 5 | Indian or other | 135,614 | 43 | Nee Soon East |
| Nee Soon Group Representation Constituency | 5 | Indian or other | 135,614 | 43 | Nee Soon South |
| Pasir Ris–Punggol Group Representation Constituency | 6 | Malay | 222,910 | 67 | Pasir Ris East |
| Pasir Ris–Punggol Group Representation Constituency | 6 | Malay | 222,910 | 67 | Pasir Ris West |
| Pasir Ris–Punggol Group Representation Constituency | 6 | Malay | 222,910 | 67 | Punggol Coast |
| Pasir Ris–Punggol Group Representation Constituency | 6 | Malay | 222,910 | 67 | Punggol North |
| Pasir Ris–Punggol Group Representation Constituency | 6 | Malay | 222,910 | 67 | Punggol West |
| Pasir Ris–Punggol Group Representation Constituency | 6 | Malay | 222,910 | 67 | Sengkang Central |
| Sembawang Group Representation Constituency | 5 | Malay | 150,658 | 47 | Admiralty |
| Sembawang Group Representation Constituency | 5 | Malay | 150,658 | 47 | Canberra |
| Sembawang Group Representation Constituency | 5 | Malay | 150,658 | 47 | Gambas |
| Sembawang Group Representation Constituency | 5 | Malay | 150,658 | 47 | Sembawang |
| Sembawang Group Representation Constituency | 5 | Malay | 150,658 | 47 | Woodlands |
| Tampines Group Representation Constituency | 5 | Malay | 145,318 | 49 | Tampines Central |
| Tampines Group Representation Constituency | 5 | Malay | 145,318 | 49 | Tampines Changkat |
| Tampines Group Representation Constituency | 5 | Malay | 145,318 | 49 | Tampines East |
| Tampines Group Representation Constituency | 5 | Malay | 145,318 | 49 | Tampines North |
| Tampines Group Representation Constituency | 5 | Malay | 145,318 | 49 | Tampines West |
| Tanjong Pagar Group Representation Constituency | 5 | Indian or other | 130,597 | 47 | Buona Vista |
| Tanjong Pagar Group Representation Constituency | 5 | Indian or other | 130,597 | 47 | Henderson–Dawson |
| Tanjong Pagar Group Representation Constituency | 5 | Indian or other | 130,597 | 47 | Moulmein–Cairnhill |
| Tanjong Pagar Group Representation Constituency | 5 | Indian or other | 130,597 | 47 | Queenstown |
| Tanjong Pagar Group Representation Constituency | 5 | Indian or other | 130,597 | 47 | Tanjong Pagar–Tiong Bahru |
| West Coast Group Representation Constituency | 4 | Indian or other | 97,485 | 35 | Ayer Rajah |
| West Coast Group Representation Constituency | 4 | Indian or other | 97,485 | 35 | Boon Lay |
| West Coast Group Representation Constituency | 4 | Indian or other | 97,485 | 35 | Telok Blangah |
| West Coast Group Representation Constituency | 4 | Indian or other | 97,485 | 35 | West Coast |

== Single Member Constituencies ==
| Division | Seats | Electorate | Polling districts |
|---|---|---|---|
| Bukit Batok Single Member Constituency | 1 | 26,850 | 9 |
| Bukit Panjang Single Member Constituency | 1 | 35,343 | 11 |
| Fengshan Single Member Constituency | 1 | 22,680 | 8 |
| Hong Kah North Single Member Constituency | 1 | 27,584 | 13 |
| Hougang Single Member Constituency | 1 | 25,912 | 10 |
| MacPherson Single Member Constituency | 1 | 27,952 | 10 |
| Mountbatten Single Member Constituency | 1 | 23,602 | 7 |
| Pioneer Single Member Constituency | 1 | 25,254 | 9 |
| Potong Pasir Single Member Constituency | 1 | 16,873 | 5 |
| Punggol East Single Member Constituency | 1 | 35,159 | 10 |
| Radin Mas Single Member Constituency | 1 | 27,265 | 10 |
| Sengkang West Single Member Constituency | 1 | 41,004 | 9 |
| Yuhua Single Member Constituency | 1 | 21,649 | 9 |
