= Nazir Ahmad Mallal =

Singaporean lawyer and politician (1904–1974)

Member of the Legislative Council for City Constituency
- In office 10 April 1951 – 5 February 1955
- Preceded by: Constituency established
- Succeeded by: Constituency abolished
- Majority: 1,308 (53.84%)

Member of the Legislative Council for Municipal South-West Constituency
- In office 20 March 1948 – 16 February 1951 Serving with Tan Chye Cheng
- Preceded by: Constituency established
- Succeeded by: Constituency abolished
- Majority: 4,056 (41.58%)

Personal details
- Born: 1904 Domel, North-West Frontier Province, British India
- Died: 19 February 1974 (aged 69–70) Gleneagles Hospital, Singapore
- Party: Progressive Party
- Education: Raffles Institution; University of London; Middle Temple
- Occupation: Lawyer

Nazir Ahmad Mallal (1904 – 19 February 1974) was a Singaporean lawyer who was the founder (with MJ Namazie) of one of Singapore's earliest law firms, Mallal and Namazie, in 1933. He served as a member of the Legislative Council, with two consecutive terms of office from 1948 to 1955.

== Early life and education ==
Mallal was born in Domel, British India, (present-day Pakistan) in 1904. He was the younger brother of Bashir Ahmad Mallal, the founder of the Malayan Law Journal.

He was educated at Raffles Institution, University of London and Middle Temple.

== Career ==
In 1933, Mallal and MJ Namazie founded Mallal and Namazie, one of Singapore's earliest law firms.

Mallal was the president of the Singapore Indian Association from 1933 to 1934.

Following the end of the Japanese occupation and Singapore's separation from the Straits Settlements as a Crown Colony, he was a founder of the Singapore Anti-Tuberculosis Association (SATA) in 1947, and the Singapore Co-operative Stores Society.

=== Political career ===
Mallal was the Municipal Commissioner from 1937 to 1947.

In 1947, Mallal founded the Progressive Party (PP), Singapore's first political party, with Tan Chye Cheng and John Laycock. He contested the general elections from 1948 to 1955, under the PP banner, which he and was subsequently elected as a member of the Legislative Council for the Municipal South-West Constituency from April 1948 to February 1951, and the City Constituency from April 1951 to February 1955.

== Personal life ==
During World War II, Mallal fought with the British Indian Army as a captain.

He married Margaret Mallal and the couple had two daughters and one son.

Mallal died on 19 February 1974 of a heart attack in Gleneagles Hospital, Singapore. He was cremated at Mount Vernon Crematorium on 21 February 1974.
