= Municipal North-East Constituency =

Former constituency in Singapore

Municipal North-East
- Former constituency for the Legislative Council of Singapore
- Location of Municipal North-East in the 1948 general election
- Region: Singapore
- Electorate: 8,691

Former constituency
- Created: 1948; 78 years ago
- Abolished: 1951; 75 years ago
- Seats: 2
- Replaced by: Balestier; Katong; Rochore

Municipal North-East was a constituency represented in the Legislative Council of Singapore from 1948 until 1951. It elected two members to the council.

== Members of the Legislative Council ==
Election	Member	Party
1948	Mohamed Javad Namazie	Independent
1948	John Laycock	Progressive Party

== Electoral results ==
=== Elections in 1940s ===
General Election 1948
Party	Candidate	Votes	%
Independent	Mohamed Javad Namazie	2,672	24.4
PP	John Laycock	2,221	20.3
Independent	M. K. Chidambaram	1,622	14.8
Independent	Charles Joseph Pemberton Paglar	1,420	13.0
Independent	Richard Lim Chuan Hoe	1,161	10.6
Independent	Valiya Purayil Abdullah	944	8.6
PP	Lim Chuan Geok	892	8.2
Turnout		5,796	66.9
Registered electors		8,668	
