= List of Singaporean electoral divisions (2001–2006) =

The following is a list of Singaporean electoral divisions from 2001 to 2006 that served as constituencies that elected Members of Parliament (MPs) to the 10th Parliament of Singapore in the 2001 Singaporean general election. Each electoral division is further subdivided into polling districts.

== Group Representation Constituencies ==
| Constituency | Seats | Minority representation | Electorate | Polling Districts | Wards |
|---|---|---|---|---|---|
| Aljunied GRC | 5 | Malay | 125,115 | 46 | Aljunied–Hougang |
| Aljunied GRC | 5 | Malay | 125,115 | 46 | Aljunied–Kembangan |
| Aljunied GRC | 5 | Malay | 125,115 | 46 | Eunos |
| Aljunied GRC | 5 | Malay | 125,115 | 46 | Kembangan–Punggol |
| Aljunied GRC | 5 | Malay | 125,115 | 46 | Paya Lebar |
| Ang Mo Kio GRC | 6 | Indian or other | 166,644 | 54 | Cheng San |
| Ang Mo Kio GRC | 6 | Indian or other | 166,644 | 54 | Jalan Kayu |
| Ang Mo Kio GRC | 6 | Indian or other | 166,644 | 54 | Kebun Baru |
| Ang Mo Kio GRC | 6 | Indian or other | 166,644 | 54 | Nee Soon South |
| Ang Mo Kio GRC | 6 | Indian or other | 166,644 | 54 | Teck Ghee |
| Ang Mo Kio GRC | 6 | Indian or other | 166,644 | 54 | Yio Chu Kang |
| Bishan–Toa Payoh GRC | 5 | Malay | 114,621 | 38 | Bishan–Toa Payoh North |
| Bishan–Toa Payoh GRC | 5 | Malay | 114,621 | 38 | Bishan East |
| Bishan–Toa Payoh GRC | 5 | Malay | 114,621 | 38 | Thomson |
| Bishan–Toa Payoh GRC | 5 | Malay | 114,621 | 38 | Toa Payoh Central |
| Bishan–Toa Payoh GRC | 5 | Malay | 114,621 | 38 | Toa Payoh East |
| East Coast GRC | 6 | Malay | 144,012 | 49 | Bedok |
| East Coast GRC | 6 | Malay | 144,012 | 49 | Changi–Simei |
| East Coast GRC | 6 | Malay | 144,012 | 49 | Fengshan |
| East Coast GRC | 6 | Malay | 144,012 | 49 | Kaki Bukit |
| East Coast GRC | 6 | Malay | 144,012 | 49 | Kampong Chai Chee |
| East Coast GRC | 6 | Malay | 144,012 | 49 | Siglap |
| Holland–Bukit Panjang GRC | 5 | Indian or other | 118,834 | 40 | Bukit Panjang |
| Holland–Bukit Panjang GRC | 5 | Indian or other | 118,834 | 40 | Buona Vista |
| Holland–Bukit Panjang GRC | 5 | Indian or other | 118,834 | 40 | Cashew |
| Holland–Bukit Panjang GRC | 5 | Indian or other | 118,834 | 40 | Ulu Pandan |
| Holland–Bukit Panjang GRC | 5 | Indian or other | 118,834 | 40 | Zhenghua |
| Hong Kah GRC | 5 | Malay | 129,073 | 43 | Bukit Gombak |
| Hong Kah GRC | 5 | Malay | 129,073 | 43 | Hong Kah North |
| Hong Kah GRC | 5 | Malay | 129,073 | 43 | Keat Hong |
| Hong Kah GRC | 5 | Malay | 129,073 | 43 | Nanyang |
| Hong Kah GRC | 5 | Malay | 129,073 | 43 | Yew Tee |
| Jalan Besar GRC | 5 | Malay | 100,268 | 43 | Jalan Besar |
| Jalan Besar GRC | 5 | Malay | 100,268 | 43 | Kampong Glam |
| Jalan Besar GRC | 5 | Malay | 100,268 | 43 | Kolam Ayer |
| Jalan Besar GRC | 5 | Malay | 100,268 | 43 | Kreta Ayer–Kim Seng |
| Jalan Besar GRC | 5 | Malay | 100,268 | 43 | Whampoa |
| Jurong GRC | 5 | Malay | 115,113 | 39 | Bukit Batok |
| Jurong GRC | 5 | Malay | 115,113 | 39 | Bukit Batok East |
| Jurong GRC | 5 | Malay | 115,113 | 39 | Jurong Central |
| Jurong GRC | 5 | Malay | 115,113 | 39 | Taman Jurong |
| Jurong GRC | 5 | Malay | 115,113 | 39 | Yuhua |
| Marine Parade GRC | 6 | Malay | 140,174 | 48 | Braddell Heights |
| Marine Parade GRC | 6 | Malay | 140,174 | 48 | Geylang Serai |
| Marine Parade GRC | 6 | Malay | 140,174 | 48 | Kampong Ubi |
| Marine Parade GRC | 6 | Malay | 140,174 | 48 | Marine Parade |
| Marine Parade GRC | 6 | Malay | 140,174 | 48 | Mountbatten |
| Marine Parade GRC | 6 | Malay | 140,174 | 48 | Serangoon |
| Pasir Ris–Punggol GRC | 5 | Malay | 134,151 | 47 | Pasir Ris East |
| Pasir Ris–Punggol GRC | 5 | Malay | 134,151 | 47 | Pasir Ris West |
| Pasir Ris–Punggol GRC | 5 | Malay | 134,151 | 47 | Punggol Central |
| Pasir Ris–Punggol GRC | 5 | Malay | 134,151 | 47 | Punggol North |
| Pasir Ris–Punggol GRC | 5 | Malay | 134,151 | 47 | Punggol South |
| Sembawang GRC | 6 | Indian or other | 166,137 | 50 | Admiralty |
| Sembawang GRC | 6 | Indian or other | 166,137 | 50 | Canberra |
| Sembawang GRC | 6 | Indian or other | 166,137 | 50 | Chong Pang |
| Sembawang GRC | 6 | Indian or other | 166,137 | 50 | Marsiling |
| Sembawang GRC | 6 | Indian or other | 166,137 | 50 | Sembawang |
| Sembawang GRC | 6 | Indian or other | 166,137 | 50 | Woodlands |
| Tampines GRC | 5 | Malay | 125,432 | 44 | Tampines–Changkat |
| Tampines GRC | 5 | Malay | 125,432 | 44 | Tampines Central |
| Tampines GRC | 5 | Malay | 125,432 | 44 | Tampines East |
| Tampines GRC | 5 | Malay | 125,432 | 44 | Tampines North |
| Tampines GRC | 5 | Malay | 125,432 | 44 | Tampines West |
| Tanjong Pagar GRC | 6 | Indian or other | 141,150 | 49 | Moulmein |
| Tanjong Pagar GRC | 6 | Indian or other | 141,150 | 49 | Queenstown |
| Tanjong Pagar GRC | 6 | Indian or other | 141,150 | 49 | Radin Mas |
| Tanjong Pagar GRC | 6 | Indian or other | 141,150 | 49 | Tanglin–Cairnhill |
| Tanjong Pagar GRC | 6 | Indian or other | 141,150 | 49 | Tanjong Pagar |
| Tanjong Pagar GRC | 6 | Indian or other | 141,150 | 49 | Tiong Bahru |
| West Coast GRC | 5 | Indian or other | 110,779 | 39 | Boon Lay |
| West Coast GRC | 5 | Indian or other | 110,779 | 39 | Clementi |
| West Coast GRC | 5 | Indian or other | 110,779 | 39 | Pioneer |
| West Coast GRC | 5 | Indian or other | 110,779 | 39 | Telok Blangah |
| West Coast GRC | 5 | Indian or other | 110,779 | 39 | West Coast |

== Single Member Constituencies ==
| Constituency | Electorate (2001) | Polling Districts |
|---|---|---|
| Ayer Rajah SMC | 18,475 | 6 |
| Bukit Timah SMC | 26,951 | 9 |
| Chua Chu Kang SMC | 24,863 | 9 |
| Hougang SMC | 23,320 | 8 |
| Joo Chiat SMC | 21,745 | 9 |
| MacPherson SMC | 22,010 | 8 |
| Nee Soon Central SMC | 22,975 | 8 |
| Nee Soon East SMC | 28,465 | 8 |
| Potong Pasir SMC | 16,616 | 5 |

== See also ==
- Group representation constituency
