= List of Singaporean electoral divisions (2006–2011) =

Electoral divisions in Singapore from 2006 to 2011

The following is a list of Singaporean electoral divisions from 2006 to 2011 that served as constituencies that elected Members of Parliament (MPs) to the 11th Parliament of Singapore in the 2006 Singaporean general election. Each electoral division is further subdivided into polling districts.

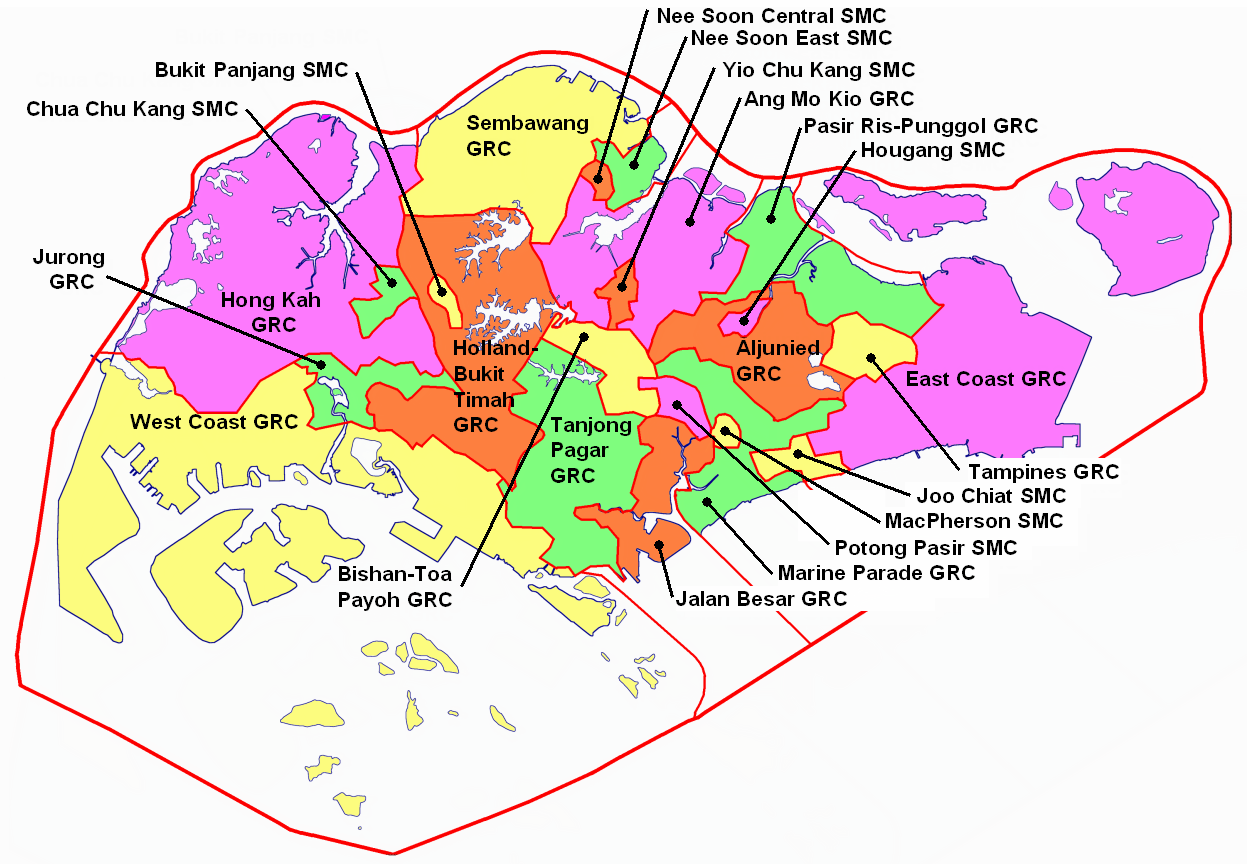
Singapore Electoral Boundaries in 2006

== Group Representation Constituencies ==
Constituency	Seats	Minority representation	Electorate	Polling Districts	Wards
Aljunied GRC	5	Malay	145,141	52	Aljunied–Hougang
Aljunied GRC	5	Malay	145,141	52	Bedok Reservoir–Punggol
Aljunied GRC	5	Malay	145,141	52	Eunos
Aljunied GRC	5	Malay	145,141	52	Paya Lebar
Aljunied GRC	5	Malay	145,141	52	Serangoon
Ang Mo Kio GRC	6	Indian or other	159,872	53	Cheng San–Seletar
Ang Mo Kio GRC	6	Indian or other	159,872	53	Jalan Kayu
Ang Mo Kio GRC	6	Indian or other	159,872	53	Kebun Baru
Ang Mo Kio GRC	6	Indian or other	159,872	53	Nee Soon South
Ang Mo Kio GRC	6	Indian or other	159,872	53	Sengkang West
Ang Mo Kio GRC	6	Indian or other	159,872	53	Teck Ghee
Bishan–Toa Payoh GRC	5	Malay	115,323	39	Bishan–Toa Payoh North
Bishan–Toa Payoh GRC	5	Malay	115,323	39	Bishan East
Bishan–Toa Payoh GRC	5	Malay	115,323	39	Thomson
Bishan–Toa Payoh GRC	5	Malay	115,323	39	Toa Payoh Central
Bishan–Toa Payoh GRC	5	Malay	115,323	39	Toa Payoh East
East Coast GRC	5	Malay	116,653	40	Bedok
East Coast GRC	5	Malay	116,653	40	Changi–Simei
East Coast GRC	5	Malay	116,653	40	Fengshan
East Coast GRC	5	Malay	116,653	40	Kampong Chai Chee
East Coast GRC	5	Malay	116,653	40	Siglap
Holland–Bukit Timah GRC	5	Indian or other	118,155	38	Bukit Timah
Holland–Bukit Timah GRC	5	Indian or other	118,155	38	Buona Vista
Holland–Bukit Timah GRC	5	Indian or other	118,155	38	Cashew
Holland–Bukit Timah GRC	5	Indian or other	118,155	38	Ulu Pandan
Holland–Bukit Timah GRC	5	Indian or other	118,155	38	Zhenghua
Hong Kah GRC	5	Malay	144,677	46	Bukit Gombak
Hong Kah GRC	5	Malay	144,677	46	Hong Kah North
Hong Kah GRC	5	Malay	144,677	46	Keat Hong
Hong Kah GRC	5	Malay	144,677	46	Nanyang
Hong Kah GRC	5	Malay	144,677	46	Yew Tee
Jalan Besar GRC	5	Malay	93,025	39	Jalan Besar
Jalan Besar GRC	5	Malay	93,025	39	Kampong Glam
Jalan Besar GRC	5	Malay	93,025	39	Kolam Ayer
Jalan Besar GRC	5	Malay	93,025	39	Kreta Ayer–Kim Seng
Jalan Besar GRC	5	Malay	93,025	39	Whampoa
Jurong GRC	5	Malay	116,636	39	Bukit Batok
Jurong GRC	5	Malay	116,636	39	Bukit Batok East
Jurong GRC	5	Malay	116,636	39	Jurong Central
Jurong GRC	5	Malay	116,636	39	Taman Jurong
Jurong GRC	5	Malay	116,636	39	Yuhua
Marine Parade GRC	6	Malay	155,149	53	Braddell Heights
Marine Parade GRC	6	Malay	155,149	53	Geylang Serai
Marine Parade GRC	6	Malay	155,149	53	Kaki Bukit
Marine Parade GRC	6	Malay	155,149	53	Kampong Ubi–Kembangan
Marine Parade GRC	6	Malay	155,149	53	Marine Parade
Marine Parade GRC	6	Malay	155,149	53	Mountbatten
Pasir Ris–Punggol GRC	6	Malay	178,443	63	Pasir Ris East
Pasir Ris–Punggol GRC	6	Malay	178,443	63	Pasir Ris West
Pasir Ris–Punggol GRC	6	Malay	178,443	63	Punggol Central
Pasir Ris–Punggol GRC	6	Malay	178,443	63	Punggol East
Pasir Ris–Punggol GRC	6	Malay	178,443	63	Punggol North
Pasir Ris–Punggol GRC	6	Malay	178,443	63	Punggol South
Sembawang GRC	6	Indian or other	184,804	57	Admiralty
Sembawang GRC	6	Indian or other	184,804	57	Canberra
Sembawang GRC	6	Indian or other	184,804	57	Chong Pang
Sembawang GRC	6	Indian or other	184,804	57	Marsiling
Sembawang GRC	6	Indian or other	184,804	57	Sembawang
Sembawang GRC	6	Indian or other	184,804	57	Woodlands
Tampines GRC	5	Malay	126,163	43	Tampines–Changkat
Tampines GRC	5	Malay	126,163	43	Tampines Central
Tampines GRC	5	Malay	126,163	43	Tampines East
Tampines GRC	5	Malay	126,163	43	Tampines North
Tampines GRC	5	Malay	126,163	43	Tampines West
Tanjong Pagar GRC	6	Indian or other	148,141	50	Moulmein
Tanjong Pagar GRC	6	Indian or other	148,141	50	Queenstown
Tanjong Pagar GRC	6	Indian or other	148,141	50	Radin Mas
Tanjong Pagar GRC	6	Indian or other	148,141	50	Tanglin–Cairnhill
Tanjong Pagar GRC	6	Indian or other	148,141	50	Tanjong Pagar
Tanjong Pagar GRC	6	Indian or other	148,141	50	Tiong Bahru
West Coast GRC	5	Indian or other	137,739	47	Ayer Rajah–West Coast
West Coast GRC	5	Indian or other	137,739	47	Boon Lay
West Coast GRC	5	Indian or other	137,739	47	Clementi
West Coast GRC	5	Indian or other	137,739	47	Pioneer
West Coast GRC	5	Indian or other	137,739	47	Telok Blangah

== Single Member Constituencies ==
Constituency	Seats	Electorate	Polling Districts
Bukit Panjang SMC	1	30,452	11
Chua Chu Kang SMC	1	24,975	9
Hougang SMC	1	23,759	8
Joo Chiat SMC	1	21,858	9
MacPherson SMC	1	21,041	8
Nee Soon Central SMC	1	23,152	8
Nee Soon East SMC	1	32,586	11
Potong Pasir SMC	1	15,888	5
Yio Chu Kang SMC	1	25,072	19
