= List of Singaporean electoral divisions (2011–2015) =

The following is a list of Singaporean electoral divisions from 2011 to 2015 that served as constituencies that elected Members of Parliament (MPs) to the 12th Parliament of Singapore in the 2011 Singaporean general election.

Singapore electoral boundaries in 2011

== Group Representation Constituencies ==
Division	Seats	Electorate		Precincts	Wards
Division	Seats	Election	Present	Precincts	Wards
Aljunied Group Representation Constituency	5 (at least one Malay MP)	143,024	143,101	50	Bedok Reservoir-Punggol, Kaki Bukit, Serangoon, Eunos, Paya Lebar
Ang Mo Kio Group Representation Constituency	6 (at least one Indian/Other MP)	178,933	179,024	60	Cheng San-Seletar, Teck Ghee, Jalan Kayu, Kebun Baru, Ang Mo Kio-Hougang, Yio Chu Kang
Bishan-Toa Payoh Group Representation Constituency	5 (at least one Malay MP)	122,416	122,476	39	Bishan East, Thomson-Toa Payoh, Toa Payoh Central, Bishan North, Toa Payoh East
Chua Chu Kang Group Representation Constituency	5 (at least one Malay MP)	158,552	158,617	53	Bukit Gombak, Chua Chu Kang, Keat Hong, Nanyang, Yew Tee
East Coast Group Representation Constituency	5 (at least one Malay MP)	120,207	120,281	39	Bedok, Siglap, Changi-Simei, Fengshan, Kampong Chai Chee
Holland-Bukit Timah Group Representation Constituency	4 (at least one Indian/Other MP)	91,559	91,588	31	Bukit Timah, Cashew, Ulu Pandan, Zhenghua
Jurong Group Representation Constituency	5 (at least one Indian/Other MP)	125,214	125,262	42	Bukit Batok, Bukit Batok East, Jurong Central, Jurong Spring, Taman Jurong
Marine Parade Group Representation Constituency	5 (at least one Malay MP)	154,340	154,412	51	Braddell Heights, Geylang Serai, Kembangan-Chai Chee, Marine Parade, Macpherson
Moulmein-Kallang Group Representation Constituency	4 (at least one Malay MP)	87,498	87,558	34	Jalan Besar, Kampong Glam, Kolam Ayer, Moulmein
Nee Soon Group Representation Constituency	5 (at least one Indian/Other MP)	148,168	148,249	47	Canberra, Chong Pang, Nee Soon Central, Nee Soon East, Nee Soon South
Pasir Ris-Punggol Group Representation Constituency	6 (at least one Malay MP)	168,834	168,911	58	Pasir Ris East, Pasir Ris West, Punggol Central, Punggol North, Punggol South, Punggol West
Sembawang Group Representation Constituency	5 (at least one Malay MP)	142,351	142,426	44	Admiralty, Marsiling, Sembawang, Woodlands, Woodgrove
Tampines Group Representation Constituency	5 (at least one Malay MP)	137,437	137,498	46	Tampines Central, Tampines East, Tampines North, Tampines Changkat, Tampines West
Tanjong Pagar Group Representation Constituency	5 (at least one Indian/Other MP)	139,638	139,738	50	Buona Vista, Queenstown, Tanjong Pagar-Tiong Bahru, Kreta Ayer-Kim Seng, Tanglin-Cairnhill
West Coast Group Representation Constituency	5 (at least one Indian/Other MP)	120,956	121,019	41	Ayer Rajah, West Coast, Boon Lay, Clementi, Telok Blangah

== Single Member Constituencies ==
Division	Seats	Electorate		Polling districts
Division	Seats	Election	Present	Polling districts
Bukit Panjang Single Member Constituency	1	33,035	33,047	11
Hong Kah North Single Member Constituency	1	27,691	27,696	9
Hougang Single Member Constituency	1	24,532	24,555	9
Joo Chiat Single Member Constituency	1	22,027	22,046	9
Mountbatten Single Member Constituency	1	23,712	23,720	7
Pioneer Single Member Constituency	1	25,732	25,740	9
Potong Pasir Single Member Constituency	1	17,306	17,318	5
Punggol East Single Member Constituency	1	33,261	33,276	10
Radin Mas Single Member Constituency	1	31,001	31,011	10
Sengkang West Single Member Constituency	1	26,869	26,875	9
Whampoa Single Member Constituency	1	21,615	21,622	7
Yuhua Single Member Constituency	1	23,183	23,195	9
