= City Constituency =

Former electoral division in Singapore

City
- Former constituency for the Legislative Council of Singapore
- Region: Singapore
- Electorate: 5,611

Former constituency
- Created: 1951
- Abolished: 1955
- Seats: 1
- Replaced by: Havelock; Stamford; Tanjong Pagar; Telok Ayer

City Constituency was a constituency represented in the Legislative Council of Singapore from 1951 until 1955.

== History ==
The constituency was formed in 1951 from carving out from Municipal South-West Constituency and in 1955, it was split into Havelock, Stamford, Tanjong Pagar and Telok Ayer constituencies.

== Members of the Legislative Council ==
Year	Member	Party
Formation
1951	Nazir Ahmad Mallal	PP
Constituency abolished (1955)

== Electoral results ==
Note: The Elections Department does not include rejected votes when calculating the vote shares of candidates. Hence, all candidates' vote shares will total to 100% at any given election (may not appear so in multi-way contests due to rounding).

=== Elections in 1950s ===
General Election 1951
Party	Candidate	Votes	%
PP	Nazir Ahmad Mallal	1,308	53.84
Independent	Balwant Singh Bajaj	1,025	42.21
Independent	Mirza Abdul Majid	96	3.95
Majority		283	11.63
Total valid votes		2,429	98.53
Rejected ballots		36	1.47
Turnout		2,465	43.93
Registered electors		5,611	
PP win (new seat)			
