= Keppel Constituency =

Former Singaporean constituency

Coordinates: 1.275°N 103.83°E

Keppel
- Former constituency for the Legislative Council of Singapore
- Region: Singapore
- Electorate: 6,683

Former constituency
- Created: 1951
- Abolished: 1955
- Seats: 1
- Replaced by: Havelock; Pasir Panjang; Queenstown; Southern Islands; Tanjong Pagar; Tiong Bahru

Keppel Constituency was a constituency represented in the Legislative Council of Singapore from 1951 until 1955. It elected one Legislative Council member. The constituency was held by Lim Yew Hock, leader of the Labour Party.

The constituency was formed from Municipal South-West Constituency in 1951. In 1955, the constituency was abolished and split into Havelock, Pasir Panjang, Queenstown, Southern Islands, Tanjong Pagar and Tiong Bahru constituencies.

== Legislative Council member ==
Year	Member	Party
1951	Lim Yew Hock	LP

== Electoral results ==
Note: The Elections Department does not include rejected votes when calculating the vote shares of candidates. Hence, all candidates' vote shares will total to 100% at any given election (may not appear so in multi-way contests due to rounding).

=== Elections in 1950s ===
General Election 1951: Keppel
Party	Candidate	Votes	%	±%
Labour Party	Lim Yew Hock	2,369	68.0	
PP	Arumugam Ponnu Rajah	1,117	32.0	
Majority		1,252	36.0	
Turnout		3,555	53.2	
Registered electors		6,683		
Labour Party win				
