= Rural East Constituency =

Former constituency of Singapore

Coordinates: 1.37°N 103.92°E

Rural East
- Former Single Member constituency for the Legislative Council of Singapore
- Location of Rural East in Singapore
- Region: Singapore
- Electorate: 2,092

Former constituency
- Created: 1948; 78 years ago
- Abolished: 1951; 75 years ago
- Seats: 1
- Party: None (independent)
- Member: Sardon Jubir (1948–1951)
- Replaced by: Changi; Seletar

Rural East Constituency was a constituency represented in the Legislative Council of Singapore from 1948 until 1951. It elected one Legislative Council member.

The constituency was formed in 1948 and cover the areas of Ang Mo Kio, Bedok, Changi, Pulau Tekong, Pulau Ubin, Paya Lebar, Punggol, Serangoon, South Seletar, Tampines, Teban and Ulu Bedok. In 1951, the constituency was abolished and split into Changi and Seletar constituencies.

== Legislative Council member ==
Election	Member	Party
1948	Sardon Jubir	Independent

== Electoral results ==
Note: The Elections Department does not include rejected votes when calculating the vote shares of candidates. Hence, all candidates' vote shares will total to 100% at any given election (may not appear so in multi-way contests due to rounding).

=== Elections in 1940s ===
General Election 1948: Rural East
Party	Candidate	Votes	%	±%
Independent	Sardon Jubir	607	54.9	
Independent	Cheong Hock Chye	498	45.1	
Majority		109	9.8	
Turnout		1,144	54.7	
Registered electors		2,092		
Independent win				
