= 1948 Singaporean general election =

- 20 March 1948

6 of the 22 seats in the Legislative Council
- Registered: 22,334
- Turnout: 63.25%
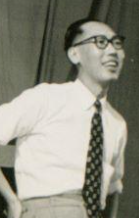

	Majority party	Minority party
Leader	Tan Chye Cheng	–
Party	Progressive	Independents
Seats won	3	3
Popular vote	11,754	11,997
Percentage	49.49%	50.51%
- Results by constituency

General elections were held in Singapore for the first time on 20 March 1948 to elect six members of the Legislative Council. The elections were part of a series of constitutional reforms introduced by the British colonial administration following the end of World War II. Six of the twenty-five seats on the Legislative Council were to be filled through direct elections, with the remainder appointed or held ex officio. The electorate was highly restricted, limited to British subjects who met strict residential and income qualifications, resulting in there being just over 22,000 registered voters from a population of approximately 940,000.

Political organisation remained minimal, with most candidates standing as independents or with limited affiliation. The Progressive Party (PP) was the only formal political party to contest the election and secured three of the six seats, becoming the most prominent elected group in the council. Voter turnout was modest, at approximately 63% of registered voters, a figure influenced by the narrow franchise and low levels of political mobilisation among the wider population.

Although highly limited in scope, the election represented a preliminary move towards greater self-governance in Singapore. The heavily restricted electorate, the dominance of appointed members and the limited powers of the elected representatives drew criticism from local political figures and civic groups, some of whom were suppressed under colonial security measures.

== Background ==
The election took place in a colonial context marked by post-war reconstruction and limited political liberalisation. Following the end of the Japanese occupation in 1945 and the dissolution of the Straits Settlements in 1946, Singapore was established as a separate Crown colony under direct British rule. The colonial administration also introduced a new constitution, the Singapore Order in Council 1946, which established an Executive Council and a Legislative Council which, for the first time, included a number of elected members.

The constitution took effect on 1 March 1948, with Singapore's first legislative elections scheduled shortly after on 20 March. Of the 22 seats in the Legislative Council, only six were open to public election, and suffrage was heavily restricted to British subjects over the age of 21 who had resided in Singapore for at least one year. As a result, fewer than 23,000 individuals registered to vote out of a population of over 940,000, and voter turnout was moderate. Political mobilisation remained constrained, with parties such as the Progressive Party (PP) advocating gradual reforms, while more left-leaning groups such as the Malayan Democratic Union (MDU) boycotted the election, criticising its limited democratic scope.

The broader political climate was shaped by rising anti-colonial sentiment and regional instability, particularly the growing communist insurgency in neighbouring Malaya, which erupted into the Malayan Emergency shortly after the election. This context heightened British colonial apprehension about leftist politics and contributed to the slow pace for reforms.

== Campaign ==
The election was announced on 1 February, and nominations were due by 16 February. The campaign period lasted for 31 days. Polling was scheduled for 20 March and the First Legislative Council was to conduct its first session on 1 April. In this election there were 4 constituencies: Municipal North-East, Municipal South-West, Rural East and Rural West. Municipal North-East and Municipal South-West elected two members each.

Singapore would not have multi-seat constituencies until 1988 for the Parliament of Singapore and was the last time that multi-seat constituencies had their candidates chosen individually (as in 1988 when the GRC was introduced, the party with the most votes had their members elected en masse rather than the votes received by the candidates individually).

== Electoral system ==
Of the 22 seats in the Legislative Council, six were elected, three nominated by commercial organisations (the Singapore Chamber of Commerce, Chinese Chamber of Commerce and Indian Chamber of Commerce) and 13 members were appointed by the British authorities; these included the Governor, Colonial Secretary, Financial Secretary, Attorney-General, Solicitor-General, two departmental directors, two ex officio commissioners and four non-ex officio members.

The six elected seats were elected from four constituencies; two two-seat constituencies and two single-member constituencies. Parties had no fixed standard symbol and candidates had to ballot for one offered by the elections office.

== Results ==
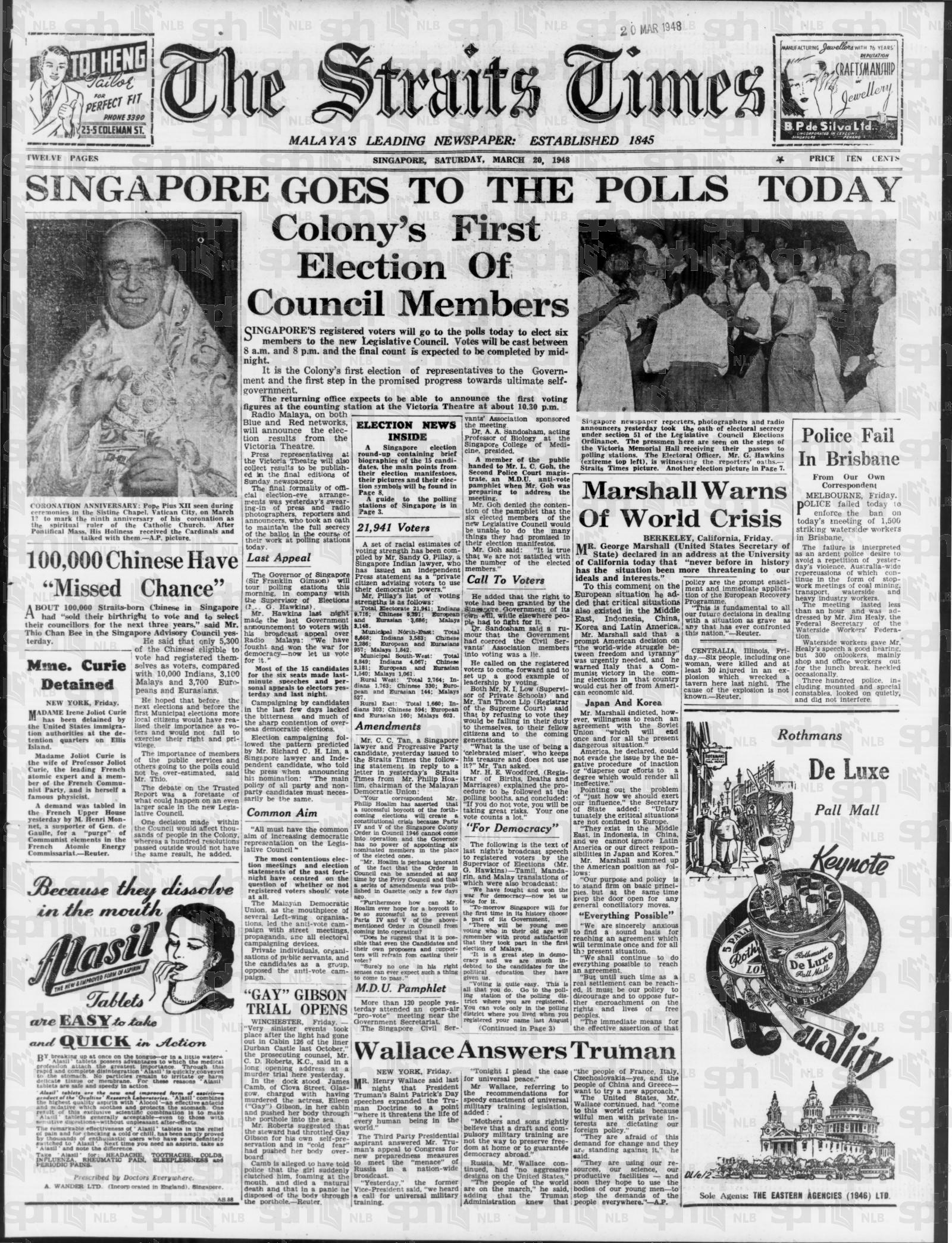
The Straits Times front page on election day

Party	Votes	%	Seats
Progressive Party	11,754	49.49	3
Independents	11,997	50.51	3
Total	23,751	100.00	6
Valid votes	23,751	94.73	
Invalid/blank votes	1,321	5.27	
Total ballots cast	14,126	–	
Registered voters/turnout	22,334	63.25	
Source: Singapore Elections

=== By constituency ===
Rural West Constituency saw the highest voter turnout at 73% while Rural East Constituency saw the lowest turnout at 55%. In percentage terms, Sardon bin Jubir (the independent candidate who stood in Rural East) was the highest scoring candidate polling 55% of the vote while PP candidate Lim Chuan Geok who stood in Municipal North-East was the worst performing candidate by polling just 8% of the votes. In absolute numbers, PP leader Tan Chye Cheng who stood in Municipal South-West was the best performing candidate by polling 4,125 votes while A. P. Rajah of the PP who stood in Rural West was the worst performing candidate with just 460 votes.

Three candidates lost their $500 electoral deposits: Lim Chuan Geok, Valiya Purayil Pillai and Richard Lim Chuan Hoe. All three candidates were candidates contesting the Municipal North-East Constituency.

Constituency	Seats	Electorate	Party	Candidate	Votes	%
Municipal North-East	2	8,668	Independent	Mohamed Javad Namazie	2,672	24.42
Municipal North-East	2	8,668	Progressive Party	John Laycock	2,221	20.32
Municipal North-East	2	8,668	Independent	M. K. Chidambaram	1,622	14.84
Municipal North-East	2	8,668	Independent	Charles Joseph Pemberton Paglar	1,420	12.99
Municipal North-East	2	8,668	Independent	Richard Lim Chuan Hoe	1,161	10.62
Municipal North-East	2	8,668	Independent	Valiya Purayil Abdullah	944	8.64
Municipal North-East	2	8,668	Progressive Party	Lim Chuan Geok	892	8.17
Municipal South-West	2	8,800	Progressive Party	Tan Chye Cheng	4,125	42.29
Municipal South-West	2	8,800	Progressive Party	Nazir Ahmad Mallal	4,056	41.59
Municipal South-West	2	8,800	Independent	Mirza Abdul Majid	1,572	16.12
Rural East	1	2,092	Independent	Sardon Jubir	607	54.93
Rural East	1	2,092	Independent	Cheong Hock Chye	498	45.07
Rural West	1	2,774	Independent	Srish Chandra Goho	981	50.03
Rural West	1	2,774	Independent	Malathi Pillai	520	23.51
Rural West	1	2,774	Progressive Party	A. P. Rajah	460	23.45
Singapore Chamber of Commerce	1	75	–	Ewen MacGregor Field Fergusson	Uncontested	
Chinese Chamber of Commerce	1	50	–	Tan Chin Tuan	Uncontested	
Indian Chamber of Commerce	1		–	Rajabali Jumabhoy	Uncontested	
Source: Singapore Elections

== See also ==
- List of Singaporean electoral divisions (1948–51)
