= List of Singaporean electoral divisions (2020–2025) =

The following is a list of Singaporean electoral divisions from 2020 to 2025 that served as constituencies that elected Members of Parliament (MPs) to the 14th Parliament of Singapore in the 2020 Singaporean general election.

As of the revision of the electorates on 15 April 2019, the number of electors in the latest Registers of Electors is 2,594,740. As of January 2025, the number of electors in the latest Registers of Electors is 2,746,052.

== Group Representation Constituencies ==
Constituency	Seats	Minority representation	Electorate	Polling Districts	Wards
Aljunied Group Representation Constituency	5	Malay & Indian	150,303	54	Bedok Reservoir–Punggol
Aljunied Group Representation Constituency	5	Malay & Indian	150,303	54	Eunos
Aljunied Group Representation Constituency	5	Malay & Indian	150,303	54	Kaki Bukit
Aljunied Group Representation Constituency	5	Malay & Indian	150,303	54	Paya Lebar
Aljunied Group Representation Constituency	5	Malay & Indian	150,303	54	Serangoon
Ang Mo Kio Group Representation Constituency	5	Indian or other	180,186	59	Ang Mo Kio–Hougang
Ang Mo Kio Group Representation Constituency	5	Indian or other	180,186	59	Cheng San–Seletar
Ang Mo Kio Group Representation Constituency	5	Indian or other	180,186	59	Jalan Kayu
Ang Mo Kio Group Representation Constituency	5	Indian or other	180,186	59	Fernvale
Ang Mo Kio Group Representation Constituency	5	Indian or other	180,186	59	Teck Ghee
Bishan–Toa Payoh Group Representation Constituency	4	Malay	100,036	34	Bishan East–Sin Ming
Bishan–Toa Payoh Group Representation Constituency	4	Malay	100,036	34	Toa Payoh Central
Bishan–Toa Payoh Group Representation Constituency	4	Malay	100,036	34	Toa Payoh East
Bishan–Toa Payoh Group Representation Constituency	4	Malay	100,036	34	Toa Payoh West–Thomson
Chua Chu Kang Group Representation Constituency	4	Malay	103,231	34	Brickland
Chua Chu Kang Group Representation Constituency	4	Malay	103,231	34	Bukit Gombak
Chua Chu Kang Group Representation Constituency	4	Malay	103,231	34	Chua Chu Kang
Chua Chu Kang Group Representation Constituency	4	Malay	103,231	34	Keat Hong
East Coast Group Representation Constituency	5	Malay	120,239	42	Bedok
East Coast Group Representation Constituency	5	Malay	120,239	42	Changi–Simei
East Coast Group Representation Constituency	5	Malay	120,239	42	Fengshan
East Coast Group Representation Constituency	5	Malay	120,239	42	Kampong Chai Chee
East Coast Group Representation Constituency	5	Malay	120,239	42	Siglap
Holland–Bukit Timah Group Representation Constituency	4	Indian	112,999	40	Bukit Timah
Holland–Bukit Timah Group Representation Constituency	4	Indian	112,999	40	Cashew
Holland–Bukit Timah Group Representation Constituency	4	Indian	112,999	40	Ulu Pandan
Holland–Bukit Timah Group Representation Constituency	4	Indian	112,999	40	Zhenghua
Jalan Besar Group Representation Constituency	4	Malay	106,578	42	Kampong Glam
Jalan Besar Group Representation Constituency	4	Malay	106,578	42	Kolam Ayer
Jalan Besar Group Representation Constituency	4	Malay	106,578	42	Kreta Ayer–Kim Seng
Jalan Besar Group Representation Constituency	4	Malay	106,578	42	Whampoa
Jurong Group Representation Constituency	5	Indian & Malay	129,933	47	Bukit Batok East
Jurong Group Representation Constituency	5	Indian & Malay	129,933	47	Clementi
Jurong Group Representation Constituency	5	Indian & Malay	129,933	47	Jurong Central
Jurong Group Representation Constituency	5	Indian & Malay	129,933	47	Jurong Spring
Jurong Group Representation Constituency	5	Indian & Malay	129,933	47	Taman Jurong
Marine Parade Group Representation Constituency	5	Malay	137,906	49	Braddell Heights
Marine Parade Group Representation Constituency	5	Malay	137,906	49	Geylang Serai
Marine Parade Group Representation Constituency	5	Malay	137,906	49	Kembangan–Chai Chee
Marine Parade Group Representation Constituency	5	Malay	137,906	49	Marine Parade
Marine Parade Group Representation Constituency	5	Malay	137,906	49	Joo Chiat
Marsiling–Yew Tee Group Representation Constituency	4	Malay	114,243	40	Limbang
Marsiling–Yew Tee Group Representation Constituency	4	Malay	114,243	40	Marsiling
Marsiling–Yew Tee Group Representation Constituency	4	Malay	114,243	40	Woodgrove
Marsiling–Yew Tee Group Representation Constituency	4	Malay	114,243	40	Yew Tee
Nee Soon Group Representation Constituency	5	Indian & Malay	137,906	45	Chong Pang
Nee Soon Group Representation Constituency	5	Indian & Malay	137,906	45	Nee Soon Central
Nee Soon Group Representation Constituency	5	Indian & Malay	137,906	45	Nee Soon East
Nee Soon Group Representation Constituency	5	Indian & Malay	137,906	45	Nee Soon Link
Nee Soon Group Representation Constituency	5	Indian & Malay	137,906	45	Nee Soon South
Pasir Ris–Punggol Group Representation Constituency	5	Malay & Indian	161,952	65	Pasir Ris West
Pasir Ris–Punggol Group Representation Constituency	5	Malay & Indian	161,952	65	Pasir Ris Central
Pasir Ris–Punggol Group Representation Constituency	5	Malay & Indian	161,952	65	Pasir Ris East
Pasir Ris–Punggol Group Representation Constituency	5	Malay & Indian	161,952	65	Punggol Coast
Pasir Ris–Punggol Group Representation Constituency	5	Malay & Indian	161,952	65	Punggol Shore
Sembawang Group Representation Constituency	5	Malay & Indian	139,724	47	Admiralty
Sembawang Group Representation Constituency	5	Malay & Indian	139,724	47	Canberra
Sembawang Group Representation Constituency	5	Malay & Indian	139,724	47	Sembawang Central
Sembawang Group Representation Constituency	5	Malay & Indian	139,724	47	Sembawang West
Sembawang Group Representation Constituency	5	Malay & Indian	139,724	47	Woodlands
Sengkang Group Representation Constituency	4	Malay	117,546	38	Anchorvale (WP) / Sengkang West (PAP)
Sengkang Group Representation Constituency	4	Malay	117,546	38	Buangkok (WP) / Sengkang Central (PAP)
Sengkang Group Representation Constituency	4	Malay	117,546	38	Compassvale (WP) / Sengkang North (PAP)
Sengkang Group Representation Constituency	4	Malay	117,546	38	Rivervale (WP) / Sengkang East (PAP)
Tampines Group Representation Constituency	5	Malay	147,249	60	Tampines Central
Tampines Group Representation Constituency	5	Malay	147,249	60	Tampines Changkat
Tampines Group Representation Constituency	5	Malay	147,249	60	Tampines East
Tampines Group Representation Constituency	5	Malay	147,249	60	Tampines North
Tampines Group Representation Constituency	5	Malay	147,249	60	Tampines West
Tanjong Pagar Group Representation Constituency	5	Indian	132,598	53	Buona Vista
Tanjong Pagar Group Representation Constituency	5	Indian	132,598	53	Henderson–Dawson
Tanjong Pagar Group Representation Constituency	5	Indian	132,598	53	Moulmein–Cairnhill
Tanjong Pagar Group Representation Constituency	5	Indian	132,598	53	Queenstown
Tanjong Pagar Group Representation Constituency	5	Indian	132,598	53	Tanjong Pagar–Tiong Bahru
West Coast Group Representation Constituency	5	Indian	144,516	51	Ayer Rajah–Gek Poh
West Coast Group Representation Constituency	5	Indian	144,516	51	Boon Lay
West Coast Group Representation Constituency	5	Indian	144,516	51	Nanyang
West Coast Group Representation Constituency	5	Indian	144,516	51	Telok Blangah
West Coast Group Representation Constituency	5	Indian	144,516	51	West Coast

== Single Member Constituencies ==
Constituency	Seats	Electorate	Polling Districts
Bukit Batok Single Member Constituency	1	29,389	10
Bukit Panjang Single Member Constituency	1	35,258	12
Hong Kah North Single Member Constituency	1	23,519	16
Hougang Single Member Constituency	1	25,629	9
Kebun Baru Single Member Constituency	1	22,413	8
MacPherson Single Member Constituency	1	27,652	10
Marymount Single Member Constituency	1	23,439	7
Mountbatten Single Member Constituency	1	23,957	8
Pioneer Single Member Constituency	1	24,679	9
Potong Pasir Single Member Constituency	1	18,551	12
Punggol West Single Member Constituency	1	25,440	7
Radin Mas Single Member Constituency	1	25,167	10
Yio Chu Kang Single Member Constituency	1	26,046	10
Yuhua Single Member Constituency	1	21,188	8
