= Municipal South-West Constituency =

Historical constituency in Singapore

Municipal South-West
- Former constituency for the Legislative Council of Singapore
- Location of Municipal South-West in Singapore
- Region: Singapore
- Electorate: 8,800

Former constituency
- Created: 1948; 78 years ago
- Abolished: 1951; 75 years ago
- Seats: 2
- Replaced by: City; Keppel; Tanglin

Municipal South-West was a constituency represented in the Legislative Council of Singapore from 1948 until 1951. It elected two members to the council.

== History ==
In 1948, the constituency was formed from merging the wards of Central, Tanglin and Tanjong Pagar.

In 1951, the constituency was abolished and split into City, Keppel and Tanglin Constituencies.

== Members of the Legislative Council ==
Year	Member	Party
Formation
1948	Tan Chye Cheng	Progressive Party
1948	Nazir Ahmad Mallal	Progressive Party
Constituency abolished (1951)

== Electoral results ==
Note: The Elections Department does not include rejected votes when calculating the vote shares of candidates. Hence, all candidates' vote shares will total to 100% at any given election (may not appear so in multi-way contests due to rounding).

=== Elections in 1940s ===
General Election 1948
Party	Candidate	Votes	%
PP	Tan Chye Cheng	4,125	42.29
PP	Nazir Ahmad Mallal	4,056	41.58
Independent	Mirza Abdul Majid	1,572	16.13
Majority		2,553	26.16
Majority		2,484	25.45
Total valid votes		9,753	94.58
Rejected ballots		547	5.42
Turnout		5,150	58.52
Registered electors		8,800	
