= Cairnhill Single Member Constituency =

Former electoral division in Singapore

Cairnhill
- Former Single Member constituency for the Parliament of Singapore
- Region: Central Region, Singapore
- Electorate: 23,197 (1988)

Former constituency
- Created: 1955
- Abolished: 1991
- Seats: 1
- Created from: Balestier; Rochore; Tanglin
- Replaced by: Kampong Glam GRC

Cairnhill Single Member Constituency (SMC) was a former single member constituency in Singapore. It used to exist from 1955 to 1988 as Cairnhill Constituency and was renamed as Cairnhill Single Member Constituency (SMC) as part of Singapore's political reforms. The SMC was merged into Kampong Glam Group Representation Constituency (GRC) in 1991.

Lim Kim San was the elected Member of Parliament from 1959 to 1980 and then Wong Kwei Cheong from 1980 to 1991.

== History ==
The constituency was formed during the 1955 Singaporean general election, encompassing Balestier, Rochore and Tanglin wards.

In 1957, David Marshall resigned from the Labour Front party and his Cairnhill seat..

During the 1959 Singaporean general election, part of the constituency was split to form River Valley Constituency.

In 1988, following the establishment of group representation constituency (GRC) and single member constituency (SMC), the constituency was known as Cairnhill Single Member Constituency. It also absorbed River Valley Constituency.

During the 1991 Singaporean general election, the SMC was merged into Kampong Glam GRC.

== Member of Parliament ==
Year	Member	Party
Formation
Legislative Assembly of Singapore
1955	David Marshall	LF
1957	Soh Ghee Soon	LSP
1959	Lim Yew Hock	SPA
1963	Lim Kim San	PAP
Parliament of Singapore
1968	Lim Kim San	PAP
1972	Lim Kim San	PAP
1976	Lim Kim San	PAP
1980	Wong Kwei Cheong	PAP
1984	Wong Kwei Cheong	PAP
1988	Wong Kwei Cheong	PAP
Constituency abolished (1991)

== Electoral results ==
Note: The Elections Department does not include rejected votes when calculating the vote shares of candidates. Hence, all candidates' vote shares will total to 100% at any given election (may not appear so in multi-way contests due to rounding).

=== Elections in the 1950s ===
General Election 1955
Party	Candidate	Votes	%
LF	David Marshall	3,305	47.58
PP	Tan Chye Cheng	2,530	36.42
DP	Tan Khiang Khoo	1,111	16.0
Majority		775	11.16
Total valid votes		6,946	99.07
Rejected ballots		65	0.93
Turnout		7,011	62.38
Registered electors		11,239	
LF win (new seat)			

By-election 1957
Party	Candidate	Votes	%	±%
LSP	Soh Ghee Soon	2,342	40.28	N/A
Independent	Goh Kong Beng	1,281	22.03	N/A
LF	Keng Ban Ee	1,118	19.23	▼28.35
Malay Union	Tengku Muda Muhamed bin Mahmud	983	16.90	N/A
Independent	Mirza Abdul Majid	91	1.56	N/A
Majority		1,061	18.25	▲7.09
Total valid votes		5,815	98.74	▼0.33
Rejected ballots		74	1.26	▲0.33
Turnout		5,889	39.79	▼22.59
Registered electors		14,802		▲31.7
LSP gain from LF				

General Election 1959
Party	Candidate	Votes	%	±%
SPA	Lim Yew Hock	5,275	48.22	N/A
WP	David Marshall	2,920	26.69	N/A
PAP	Oh Su Chen	2,262	20.68	N/A
LSP	Tan Keng Siong	483	4.41	▼35.87
Majority		2,355	21.53	▲3.28
Total valid votes		10,940	89.39	▼9.35
Rejected ballots		105	10.61	▲9.35
Turnout		11,045	90.24	▲50.45
Registered electors		12,239		▼17.32
SPA gain from LSP				

=== Elections in the 1960s ===
General Election 1963
Party	Candidate	Votes	%	±%
PAP	Lim Kim San	7,749	66.46	▲45.78
BS	Lim Ang Chuan	2,443	20.95	N/A
SA	Lee Ah Seong	1,467	12.59	▼35.63
Majority		5,306	45.51	▲23.98
Total valid votes		11,659	99.22	▲9.83
Rejected ballots		92	0.78	▼9.83
Turnout		11,751	95.23	▲4.99
Registered electors		12,340		▲0.83
PAP gain from SA				

General Election 1968
Party	Candidate	Votes	%	±%
PAP	Lim Kim San	Unopposed		
Registered electors		12,287		▼0.43
PAP hold				

=== Elections in the 1970s ===
General Election 1972
Party	Candidate	Votes	%	±%
PAP	Lim Kim San	8,458	80.92	N/A
United National Front	Paul Elisha	1,994	19.08	N/A
Majority		6,464	61.84	N/A
Total valid votes		10,452	97.96	N/A
Rejected ballots		218	2.04	N/A
Turnout		10,670	89.27	N/A
Registered electors		11,952		▼2.73
PAP hold				

General Election 1976
Party	Candidate	Votes	%	±%
PAP	Lim Kim San	7,979	68.17	▼12.75
Independent	Chiam See Tong	3,726	31.83	N/A
Majority		4,253	36.34	▼25.5
Total valid votes		11,705	97.91	▼0.05
Rejected ballots		251	2.09	▲0.05
Turnout		11,956	89.10	▼0.17
Registered electors		13,419		▲12.27
PAP hold		Swing	▼12.75	

=== Elections in the 1980s ===
General Election 1980
Party	Candidate	Votes	%	±%
PAP	Wong Kwei Cheong	11,444	71.79	▲3.62
SDP	Fok Tai Loy	4,498	28.21	N/A
Majority		6,946	43.58	▲7.24
Total valid votes		15,942	97.97	▲0.06
Rejected ballots		331	2.03	▼0.06
Turnout		16,273	89.74	▲0.64
Registered electors		18,133		▲35.13
PAP hold		Swing	▲3.62	

General Election 1984
Party	Candidate	Votes	%	±%
PAP	Wong Kwei Cheong	Unopposed		
Registered electors		15,862		▼12.52
PAP hold				

General Election 1988
Party	Candidate	Votes	%	±%
PAP	Wong Kwei Cheong	12,779	63.98	N/A
SDP	Jimmy Tan Tiang Hoe	7,194	36.02	N/A
Majority		5,585	27.96	N/A
Total valid votes		19,973	98.04	N/A
Rejected ballots		399	1.96	N/A
Turnout		20,372	87.82	N/A
Registered electors		23,197		▲46.24
PAP hold				

== Historical maps ==
1955 General Elections
