= Balestier Constituency =

Former electoral division in Singapore

Balestier
- Former constituency for the Legislative Council of Singapore
- Region: Singapore
- Electorate: 5,246

Former constituency
- Created: 1951
- Abolished: 1955
- Seats: 1
- Replaced by: Cairnhill; Farrer Park; Serangoon; Whampoa

Balestier was a constituency represented in the Legislative Council of Singapore from 1951 until 1955. In 1955, the constituency was abolished and split into Cairnhill, Farrer Park, Serangoon and Whampoa constituencies.

== Legislative Council member ==
Year	Member	Party
Formation
1951	Thio Chan Bee	PP
Constituency abolished (1955)

== Electoral results ==
Note: The Elections Department does not include rejected votes when calculating the vote shares of candidates. Hence, all candidates' vote shares will total to 100% at any given election (may not appear so in multi-way contests due to rounding).

=== Elections in 1950s ===
General Election 1951
Party	Candidate	Votes	%
PP	Thio Chan Bee	1,560	58.34
Labour Party	Peter Massillamany Williams	593	22.18
Independent	Jagatheesan Kalimuthu	521	19.48
Majority		967	36.16
Total valid votes		2,674	98.96
Rejected ballots		28	1.04
Turnout		2,702	51.51
Registered electors		5,246	
PP win (new seat)			
