= Tanglin Single Member Constituency =

Former Singaporean constituency

Tanglin
- Former Single Member constituency for the Parliament of Singapore
- Electorate: 16,801 (1991)

Former constituency
- Created: 1951
- Abolished: 1997
- Seats: 1
- Created from: Municipal South–West
- Replaced by: Kreta Ayer–Tanglin GRC

Tanglin Single Member Constituency was a single member constituency (SMC) in the city area of Singapore. The constituency was formed in 1951 and was abolished in 1997.

== History ==
In 1951, the Tanglin Constituency was formed by carving up Municipal South-West Constituency. In 1955, parts of the constituency were divided to form Cairnhill, Havelock and Queenstown constituencies. In 1959, it was further divided to form River Valley and Ulu Pandan constituencies.

In 1988, it was renamed as Tanglin Single Member Constituency as part of Singapore's political reforms. In 1997, it was abolished and merged into Kreta Ayer–Tanglin Group Representation Constituency.

== Member of Parliament ==
Year	Member	Party
Formation
Legislative Council of Singapore
1951	Tan Chye Cheng	PP
Legislative Assembly of Singapore
1955	John Ede	PP
1959	Thio Chan Bee	SPA
1963	E. W. Barker	PAP
Parliament of Singapore
1965	E. W. Barker	PAP
1968	E. W. Barker	PAP
1972	E. W. Barker	PAP
1976	E. W. Barker	PAP
1980	E. W. Barker	PAP
1984	E. W. Barker	PAP
1988	Lew Syn Pau	PAP
1991	Lew Syn Pau	PAP
Constituency abolished (1988)

== Electoral results ==
Note: The Elections Department does not include rejected votes when calculating the vote shares of candidates. Hence, all candidates' vote shares will total to 100% at any given election (may not appear so in multi-way contests due to rounding).

=== Elections in 1950s ===
General Election 1951
Party	Candidate	Votes	%
PP	Tan Chye Cheng	1,416	80.14
Labour Party	Thomas Davies Richards	351	19.86
Majority			
Total valid votes			
Rejected ballots			
Turnout		1,794	45.4
Registered electors			
PP win (new seat)			

General Election 1955
Party	Candidate	Votes	%	±%
PP	John Ede	3,214	45.67	−34.47
DP	Lim Yong Bock	2,501	35.54	+35.54
LF	Lim Seow Chuan	1,322	18.79	+18.79
Majority				N/A
Total valid votes				N/A
Rejected ballots				N/A
Turnout		7,125	44.0	−1.4
Registered electors				
PP hold		Swing	-34.47	

General Election 1959
Party	Candidate	Votes	%	±%
SPA	Thio Chan Bee	2,698	34.41	+34.41
UMNO	Ahmad bin Haji Taff	2,386	30.44	+30.44
PAP	Ibrahim bin Othman	2,360	30.11	+30.11
LSP	Chan Ah Wing	395	5.04	+5.04
Majority				N/A
Total valid votes				N/A
Rejected ballots				N/A
Turnout		12,892	87.7	
Registered electors				
SPA gain from PP		Swing	+34.41	

Note: UMNO, the Malayan Chinese Association (MCA), the Malayan Indian Congress (MIC) and the Singapore People's Alliance (SPA) became an alliance in 1961. Ahmad was hence viewed by the Elections Department as a candidate for the Singapore Alliance (SA).

=== Elections in 1960s ===
General Election 1963: Tanglin
Party	Candidate	Votes	%	±%
PAP	E. W. Barker	4,424	51.07	▲20.96
BS	Tan Cheow Hock	1,997	23.06	▲23.06
SA	Thio Chan Bee	1,738	20.07	▼14.34
UPP	Eng Chau Sam	336	3.88	N/A
Independent	Ariffin bin Mohd Said	166	1.92	N/A
Majority				N/A
Total valid votes				N/A
Rejected ballots				N/A
Turnout		8,731	94.5	+6.8
Registered electors				
PAP gain from SA		Swing	▲20.96	

General Election 1968
Party	Candidate	Votes	%	±%
PAP	E. W. Barker	Unopposed		
Registered electors				
PAP hold				

=== Elections in 1970s ===
General Election 1972
Party	Candidate	Votes	%	±%
PAP	E. W. Barker	Unopposed		
Registered electors				
PAP hold				

General Election 1976
Party	Candidate	Votes	%	±%
PAP	E. W. Barker	Unopposed		
Registered electors				
PAP hold				

=== Elections in 1980s ===
General Election 1980
Party	Candidate	Votes	%	±%
PAP	E. W. Barker	Unopposed		
Registered electors				
PAP hold				

General Election 1984
Party	Candidate	Votes	%	±%
PAP	E. W. Barker	Unopposed		
Registered electors				
PAP hold				

General Election 1988
Party	Candidate	Votes	%	±%
PAP	Lew Syn Pau	Unopposed		
Registered electors				
PAP hold				

=== Elections in 1990s ===
General Election 1991
Party	Candidate	Votes	%	±%
PAP	Lew Syn Pau	9,113	68.52	N/A
SDP	Jimmy Tan Tiang Hoe	4,022	30.25	N/A
Independent	Gnaguru s/o Thamboo Mylvaganam	163	1.23	N/A
Majority				N/A
Total valid votes				N/A
Rejected ballots				N/A
Turnout		13,555	80.7	
Registered electors				
PAP hold		Swing		

== Historical maps ==
1955 General Elections
