= Legislative Council of Singapore =

Legislative Council of the Colony of Singapore

Type
- Type: Unicameral

History
- Established: 1 June 1946; 80 years ago
- Disbanded: 5 February 1955; 71 years ago
- Preceded by: Legislative Council of the Straits Settlements
- Succeeded by: Legislative Assembly of Singapore

Elections
- Last election: 21 September 1951; 74 years ago

Meeting place
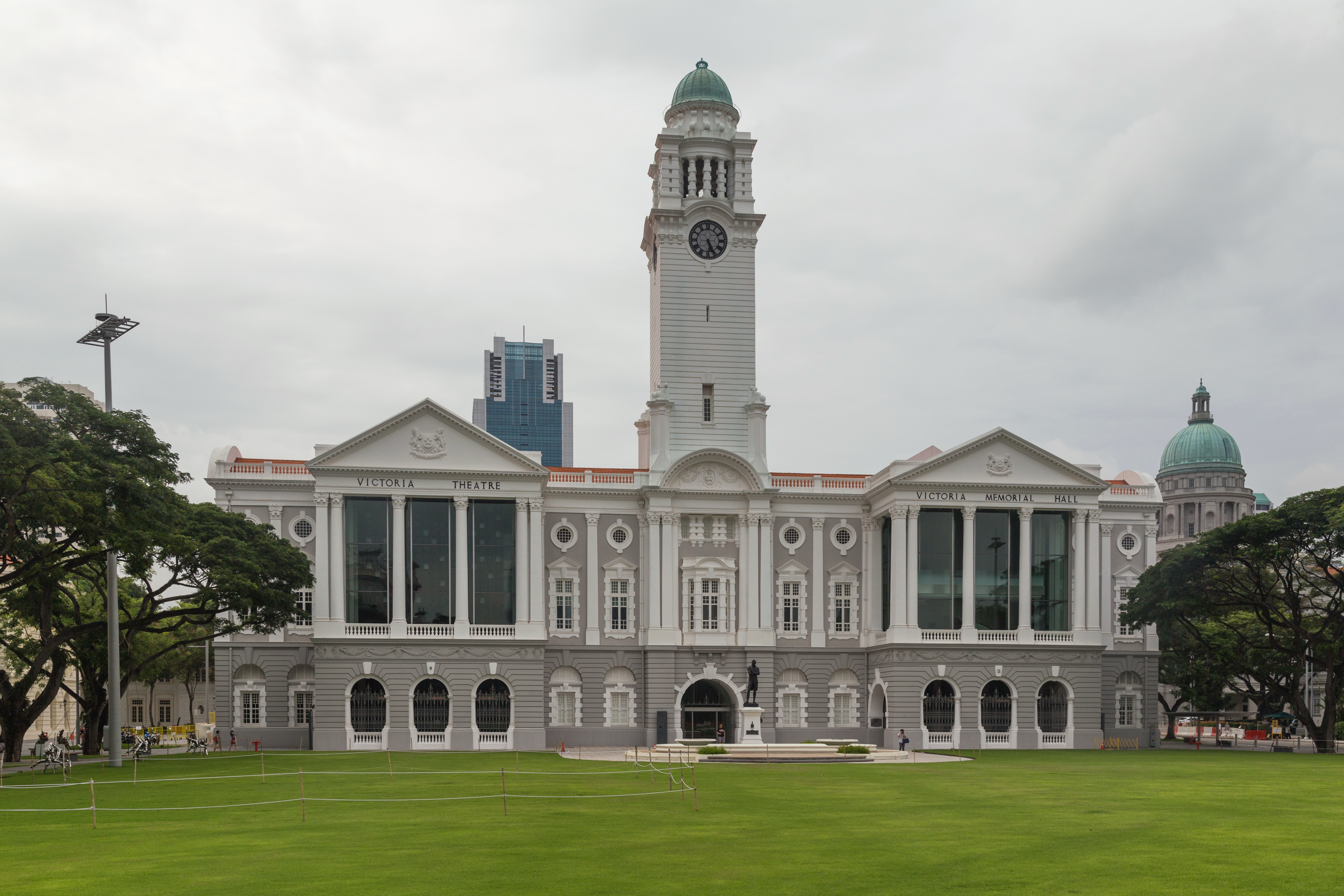
- Victoria Memorial Hall

The Legislative Council of the Colony of Singapore was the legislative council of Singapore that assisted the governor in making laws in the colony. It officially came into existence in 1946, when the Straits Settlements (Repeal) Act 1946 abolished the Straits Settlements, and made Singapore a Crown colony that would need its own legislative council. Based on existing systems already in place when the council operated under the Straits Settlements, it was partially opened for public voting in 1948, before being replaced by the Legislative Assembly in 1953.

== History ==
=== Legislative Council of the Straits Settlements (1867–1942) ===
The Legislative Council of the Straits Settlements was formed on 1 April 1867 when the Straits Settlements was made a Crown Colony that answered directly to the Secretary of State for the Colonies in London, instead of the Calcutta colonial government based in India. Letters patent granted a Colonial Constitution on 4 February, which allocated much power to the governor. He was assisted by an Executive Council and Legislative Council, the latter of which was entrusted with law-making in the colony. However, the governor had a casting vote and the power of assent and veto on all bills.

The Legislative Council was composed of members of the Executive Council, the chief justice, and non-official members nominated by the governor. These nominated members were intended to better represent the local people, including in its ranks Asian members. Mostly wealthy Asian business and professional leaders, they were not necessarily a fair representation of the locals, however. Starting with four members, it started to grow through the years, with Singaporean members increasingly dominating the council to the displeasure of the politicians from Malacca and Penang.

Despite this control by British subjects of the European race, the local Asian population was usually apathetic about such control. There have been a few exceptions. Tan Cheng Lock, a member of the Executive Council who had previously opposed several policies made by the Legislative Council – such as the Aliens Ordinance of 1933 which restricted immigration – as anti-Chinese, called for direct popular representation through popular votes, and to increase the number of non-official members to form a majority in the Legislative Council. Initiatives like these were unsuccessful, however, as there was little support from wider society were widely apathetic to local politics, with the Chinese population paying more attention towards growing their commercial and professional interests, and the events occurring back in China, fueled largely by the rise in Chinese nationalism sentiments.

=== Legislative Council of the Colony of Singapore (1946–1955) ===
After World War II, the Straits Settlements (Repeal) Act of 1946 dissolved the Straits Settlements, with Singapore becoming a Crown Colony on its own while Penang and Malacca joined the Malayan Union. The effects of the war led to major changes in attitudes towards the British colonial government, particularly with the drop in confidence in their ability to govern and protect Singapore, and a resulting desire to have greater say and participation in local affairs. With mounting local pressure, a new Colonial Constitution was passed, with the Singapore Colony Order-in-Council of 1946 to 1948 providing for public voting to take place for the first time with the first general election of 1948.

Elected members of the Legislative Council were restricted to only six non-official members, however, voting was only open to adult British subjects who had been residents in Singapore for at least a year before the elections. The rest of the thirteen non-officials including four nominated members by the governor and three by the chambers of commerce. Nine official members complete the council. The governor continued to exercise significant power, included the right to veto bills by the council.

== List of sessions ==
| Legislative Council | Commenced | Session | Session dates | Dissolved | By-elections |
|---|---|---|---|---|---|
| 1st (1948) | 1 April 1948 | 1st | | 16 February 1951 | 1948 |
| 1st (1948) | 1 April 1948 | 2nd | | 16 February 1951 | 1948 |
| 1st (1948) | 1 April 1948 | 3rd | | 16 February 1951 | 1948 |
| 1st (1948) | 1 April 1948 | 4th | 16 January 1951 – 16 February 1951 | 16 February 1951 | 1948 |
| 2nd (1951) | 17 April 1951 | 1st | 17 April 1951 – 18 December 1951 | 5 February 1955 | 1952 |
| 2nd (1951) | 17 April 1951 | 2nd | 19 February 1952 – 16 December 1952 | 5 February 1955 | 1952 |
| 2nd (1951) | 17 April 1951 | 3rd | 24 February 1953 – 15 December 1953 | 5 February 1955 | 1952 |
| 2nd (1951) | 17 April 1951 | 4th | 16 March 1954 – 29 January 1955 | 5 February 1955 | 1952 |

== Successor legislatures ==
- Legislative Assembly of Singapore → Parliament of Singapore
