= Constituencies of Singapore =

Subdivisions of Singapore for electoral purposes of representation in Parliament

Constituencies in Singapore are electoral divisions which may be represented by single or multiple seats in the Parliament of Singapore. Constituencies, also called (electoral) divisions, are classified as either single-member constituencies (SMCs) or group representation constituencies (GRCs). An SMC is represented by a single Member of Parliament (MP) while a GRC can have anywhere between three and six (in practice, four or five) seats in Parliament.

== Group Representation Constituencies ==
In 1988, the People's Action Party (PAP) introduced Group Representation Constituencies (GRCs) through an amendment to the Parliamentary Elections Act. The President, acting on the advice of the Prime Minister and guided by the Elections Department, may establish GRCs consisting of three to five electoral wards. The maximum size of GRCs has varied over time: initially three candidates, increasing to four in 1991, six between 1997 and 2020, and then reduced to five from the 2020 elections onwards.

GRCs are a unique feature of Singaporean electoral politics, consisting of multi-member constituencies where teams, or slates, of candidates from a single party or independents compete for all available seats. Each GRC team must include at least one candidate from a minority race, such as a Malay, Indian, or Other. Voting within GRCs follows a plurality voting system, where the party or group winning the most votes in a GRC secures all seats within that constituency. As a result, a party can accumulate a significant number of votes nationally but still fail to win certain GRCs. Historically, the PAP held all GRC seats until 2011. The official purpose of GRCs, as explained by former Prime Minister Goh Chok Tong, is to ensure minority representation in Parliament and maintain a multiracial composition.

=== Response ===
Opposition parties have criticised that the GRC system in making it more difficult for non-PAP candidates to win seats in Parliament. The high candidate deposit, which ranges from S$4,000 to S$16,000 and was most recently set at S$13,500 per candidate, increases the financial burden on opposition parties contesting GRCs. Additionally, the inclusion of Cabinet Ministers as candidates in GRCs is viewed as an advantage for the PAP, a strategy that has been employed in vulnerable constituencies such as Cheng San GRC during the 1997 Singaporean general election. The opposition has also raised concerns about last-minute boundary changes and has pointed to examples such as Joshua Benjamin Jeyaratnam's 1981 win in the Anson constituency, arguing that minority representation in Parliament has diminished since the GRC system was introduced.

The boundaries of electoral constituencies in Singapore are set by the Elections Department, which functions under the Prime Minister's Office. These boundaries are typically announced shortly before elections, often only a few days before the election is officially called. Some observers have expressed concern over this process, particularly regarding the dissolution of constituencies where opposition parties had performed well.

One frequently cited example in discussions about electoral boundary adjustments is Cheng San GRC. In the 1997 Singaporean general election, it was contested closely by the PAP and the Workers' Party of Singapore (WP), with the PAP winning 54.8% of the vote to WP’s 45.2%. Following the 2001 Singapore general election, Cheng San GRC was dissolved. Despite the challenges faced by opposition parties, the WP has since achieved success in winning GRCs, notably Aljunied GRC in the 2011 Singapore general election and Sengkang GRC in the 2020 Singaporean general election.

== Current electoral map (2025 – present) ==
As of March 2025, the number of electors in the latest Registers of Electors is 2,758,095.

=== Group Representation Constituencies (2025) ===
Constituency	Seats	District Prefix	Minority representation	Electorate	Polling Districts	Wards
Aljunied	5	AJ	Malay	144,276	51	Bedok Reservoir–Punggol, Eunos, Kaki Bukit, Paya Lebar, Serangoon
Ang Mo Kio	5	AM	Indian or other	161,494	55	Ang Mo Kio–Hougang, Buangkok–Fernvale South, Cheng San, Seletar–Serangoon, Teck Ghee
Bishan–Toa Payoh	4	BS	Malay	98,679	35	Bishan East–Sin Ming, Toa Payoh Central, Toa Payoh East, Toa Payoh West–Thomson
Chua Chu Kang	4	CK	Malay	93,512	35 (Note: Polling districts AJ53, AJ54, CK01, CK02, EC42, HT40, JR47, MY14, PS11 and WE27 have to share polling stations near each other to optimise demand.)	Brickland–Tengah, Chua Chu Kang, Keat Hong, Tengah
East Coast	5	EC	Malay	151,024	53	Bedok, Changi–Simei, Fengshan, Joo Chiat, Kampong Chai Chee
Holland–Bukit Timah	4	HT	Indian or other	123,169	40	Bukit Timah, Cashew, Ulu Pandan, Zhenghua
Jalan Besar	4	JB	Malay	106,327	42	Kampong Glam, Kolam Ayer, Kreta Ayer–Kim Seng, Whampoa
Jurong East–Bukit Batok	5	JE	Indian or other	142,728	48	Bukit Batok, Bukit Batok East, Clementi, Hong Kah North, Yuhua
Marine Parade–Braddell Heights	5	MH	Malay	131,789	47	Braddell Heights, Geylang Serai, Kembangan, MacPherson, Marine Parade
Marsiling–Yew Tee	4	MY	Malay	119,516	41	Limbang, Marsiling, Woodgrove, Yew Tee
Nee Soon	5	NS	Indian or other	151,836	50	Chong Pang, Nee Soon Central, Nee Soon East, Nee Soon Link, Nee Soon South
Pasir Ris–Changi	4	PC	Malay	100,706	32	Changi, Pasir Ris Central, Pasir Ris East, Pasir Ris West
Punggol	4	PG	Indian or other	123,778	43	Punggol Coast, Punggol North, Punggol Shore, Punggol West
Sembawang	5	SB	Malay	134,103	46	Admiralty, Canberra, Naval Base, Sembawang Central, Woodlands
Sengkang	4	SK	Malay	126,808	41	Anchorvale (WP) / Sengkang West (PAP), Buangkok (WP) / Sengkang Central (PAP), Compassvale (WP) / Sengkang North (PAP), Rivervale (WP) / Sengkang East (PAP)
Tampines	5	TM	Malay	148,098	55	Tampines Boulevard, Tampines Central, Tampines East, Tampines North, Tampines West
Tanjong Pagar	5	TP	Indian or other	140,075	52	Buona Vista, Henderson–Dawson, Moulmein–Cairnhill, Telok Blangah, Tanjong Pagar–Tiong Bahru
West Coast-Jurong West	5	WJ	Indian or other	158,817	54	Ayer Rajah, Boon Lay, Jurong Spring–Gek Poh, Nanyang, Taman Jurong, West Coast

=== Single Member Constituencies ===
Constituency	Seats	District Prefix	Electorate	Polling Districts
Bukit Gombak	1	BG	26,418	7
Bukit Panjang	1	BP	33,594	12
Hougang	1	HG	29,466	9
Jalan Kayu	1	JK	29,620	10
Jurong Central	1	JU	29,669	12
Kebun Baru	1	KR	22,251	9
Marymount	1	MR	23,264	7
Mountbatten	1	MB	22,831	7
Pioneer	1	PI	25,195	9
Potong Pasir	1	PS	30,959	10
Queenstown	1	QT	28,905	11
Radin Mas	1	RM	25,559	11
Sembawang West	1	SE	24,192	7
Tampines Changkat	1	TC	24,032	9
Yio Chu Kang	1	YK	25,404	9

== See also ==
- General elections in Singapore
  - Past Singaporean electoral divisions
- Administrative divisions of Singapore
  - Subdivisions of Singapore
- Urban planning in Singapore
  - Regions of Singapore
  - Urban planning areas in Singapore
  - List of places in Singapore
- Urban renewal in Singapore
  - Future developments in Singapore
  - Land reclamation in Singapore
- Geography of Singapore
- List of electoral divisions and wards in Singapore
