= 3rd Legislative Assembly of Singapore =

Last legislative assembly of Singapore, 1963-1965

←	2nd Legislative Assembly	1st Parliament	→
Composition at the start of the 3rd Legislative Assembly of Singapore
PAP (37)	BS (13)	UPP (1)

Overview
- Legislative body: Legislative Assembly of Singapore
- Meeting place: Old Parliament House
- Term: 22 October 1963 – 7 December 1965
- Election: 21 September 1963
- Government: People's Action Party
- Opposition: Barisan Sosialis; United People's Party (until 1965)

Legislative Assembly of Singapore
- Members: 51
- Speaker: E. W. Barker (until 1964); A. P. Rajah (from 1964)
- Leader of the House: Toh Chin Chye
- Prime Minister: Lee Kuan Yew
- Leader of the Opposition: Lim Huan Boon
- Party control: PAP supermajority

Sessions
- 1st: 22 October 1963 – 16 June 1965

The 3rd Legislative Assembly of Singapore was a meeting of the Legislative Assembly of Singapore. Its first and only session started on 22 October 1963 and ended on 16 June 1965. The assembly was dissolved on 7 December 1965 and was succeeded by the 1st Parliament of Singapore.

== Officeholders ==
- Speaker:
  - E. W. Barker (Tanglin, PAP), until 30 October 1964
  - A. P. Rajah (Independent), from 2 November 1964
- Deputy Speaker: Fong Kim Heng (Joo Chiat, PAP)
- Prime Minister: Lee Kuan Yew (Tanjong Pagar, PAP)
- Deputy Prime Minister: Toh Chin Chye (Rochore, PAP)
- Leader of the Opposition: Lim Huan Boon (Bukit Merah, BS)
- Leader of the House: Toh Chin Chye (Rochore, PAP)
- Government Party Whip: Chan Chee Seng (Jalan Besar, PAP)

== Composition ==
Party	Members	
Party	At election	At dissolution
People's Action Party	37	38
Barisan Sosialis	13	13
United People's Party	1	0
Total	51	51
Government majority	23	25

== Members ==
Constituency	Member	Party
Aljunied	S. V. Lingam	People's Action Party
Anson	P. Govindaswamy	People's Action Party
Bras Basah	Ho See Beng	People's Action Party
Bukit Merah	Lim Huan Boon	Barisan Sosialis
Bukit Panjang	Ong Lian Teng	Barisan Sosialis
Bukit Timah	Lee Tee Tong	Barisan Sosialis
Cairnhill	Lim Kim San	People's Action Party
Changi	Sim Boon Woo	People's Action Party
Chua Chu Kang	Chio Cheng Thun	Barisan Sosialis
Crawford	S. T. Bani	Barisan Sosialis
Delta	Chan Choy Siong	People's Action Party
Farrer Park	S. Rajoo	People's Action Party
Geylang East	Ho Cheng Choon	People's Action Party
Geylang Serai	Rahmat Kenap	People's Action Party
Geylang West	Yong Nyuk Lin	People's Action Party
Havelock	Loh Miaw Gong	Barisan Sosialis
Hong Lim	Ong Eng Guan (Note: Ong Eng Guan resigned on 16 June 1965.)	United People's Party
Hong Lim	Lee Khoon Choy (Note: Lee Khoon Choy was by-elected on 10 July 1965, to succeed Ong Eng Guan.)	People's Action Party
Jalan Besar	Chan Chee Seng	People's Action Party
Jalan Kayu	Tan Cheng Tong	Barisan Sosialis
Joo Chiat	Fong Kim Heng	People's Action Party
Jurong	Chia Thye Poh	Barisan Sosialis
Kallang	Buang Omar Junid	People's Action Party
Kampong Glam	S. Rajaratnam	People's Action Party
Kampong Kapor	Mahmud Awang	People's Action Party
Kampong Kembangan	Ariff Suradi	People's Action Party
Kreta Ayer	Goh Keng Swee	People's Action Party
Moulmein	Avadai Dhanam Lakshimi	People's Action Party
Mountbatten	Ng Yeow Chong	People's Action Party
Nee Soon	Chan Sun Wing	Barisan Sosialis
Pasir Panjang	Othman Wok	People's Action Party
Paya Lebar	Kow Kee Seng	Barisan Sosialis
Punggol	Ng Kah Ting	People's Action Party
Queenstown	Jek Yeun Thong	People's Action Party
River Valley	Lim Cheng Lock	People's Action Party
Rochore	Toh Chin Chye	People's Action Party
Sembawang	Teong Eng Siong	People's Action Party
Sepoy Lines	Wee Toon Boon	People's Action Party
Serangoon Gardens	R. A. Gonzales	People's Action Party
Siglap	Abdul Rahim Ishak	People's Action Party
Southern Islands	Ya'acob Mohamed	People's Action Party
Stamford	Fong Sip Chee	People's Action Party
Tampines	Poh Ber Liak	Barisan Sosialis
Tanglin	E. W. Barker	People's Action Party
Tanjong Pagar	Lee Kuan Yew	People's Action Party
Telok Ayer	Ong Pang Boon	People's Action Party
Telok Blangah	Bernard Rodrigues	People's Action Party
Thomson	Koo Young	Barisan Sosialis
Tiong Bahru	Lee Teck Him	People's Action Party
Toa Payoh	Wong Soon Fong	Barisan Sosialis
Ulu Pandan	Chow Chiok Hock	People's Action Party
Upper Serangoon	Sia Kah Hui	People's Action Party
