= 1st Parliament of Singapore =

Singaporean parliamentary meeting

←	3rd Legislative Assembly	2nd Parliament	→
Initial composition
Government:
PAP (38)
Opposition:
BS (13)

Overview
- Legislative body: Parliament of Singapore
- Meeting place: Old Parliament House
- Term: 8 December 1965 – 8 February 1968 (2 years and 2 months)
- Government: People's Action Party
- Opposition: Barisan Sosialis (boycotted)

Parliament of Singapore
- Members: 51
- Speaker: A. P. Rajah (until 5 August 1966); Punch Coomaraswamy (from 17 August 1966)
- Leader of the House: Toh Chin Chye
- Prime Minister: Lee Kuan Yew
- Leader of the Opposition: Lim Huan Boon (until 31 December 1965); Chia Thye Poh (1 January – 7 October 1966)
- Party control: PAP supermajority

Sessions
- 1st: 8 December 1965 – 8 February 1968 (2 years and 2 months)

The 1st Parliament of Singapore was a meeting of the Parliament of Singapore. It commenced its first and only session on 8 December 1965 and was dissolved on 8 February 1968. The session was boycotted by the Barisan Sosialis (BS), who refused to take up their seats in Parliament.

The members of the First Parliament were elected in the 1963 general election to the 3rd Legislative Assembly of Singapore, which became the Parliament of Singapore following Singapore's independence in 1965. The First Parliament was controlled by a People's Action Party (PAP) supermajority, led by Prime Minister Lee Kuan Yew and his Cabinet. A. P. Rajah served as Speaker until 1966, with Punch Coomaraswamy serving as Speaker afterwards.

The First Parliament had twelve changes of composition throughout its term, the most for any Parliament to date as of 2026; eleven members from the Barisan Sosialis and the PAP's Fong Kim Heng vacated their seats during the session. This was followed by a series of by-elections from 1966 to 1968.

== Results of the 1963 general election ==
Party	Votes	%	Seats	+/–
People's Action Party	272,924	46.93	37	▲12
Barisan Sosialis	193,301	33.24	13	▼1
Singapore Alliance	48,967	8.42	0	▼7
United People's Party	48,785	8.39	1	▼1
Parti Rakyat	8,259	1.42	0	Steady
Pan-Malayan Islamic Party	1,545	0.27	0	Steady
United Democratic Party	760	0.13	0	New
Workers' Party	286	0.05	0	Steady
Independents	6,788	1.17	0	▼2
Total	581,615	100.00	51	0
Valid votes	581,615	99.01		
Invalid/blank votes	5,818	0.99		
Total votes	587,433	100.00		
Registered voters/turnout	617,450	95.14		
Source: Singapore Elections

== Officeholders ==
- Speaker:
  - A. P. Rajah (Independent), until 5 August 1966
  - Punch Coomaraswamy (Independent), from 17 August 1966
- Deputy Speaker: Punch Coomaraswamy (Independent), until 16 August 1966
- Prime Minister: Lee Kuan Yew (Tanjong Pagar, PAP)
- Deputy Prime Minister: Toh Chin Chye (Rochore, PAP)
- Leader of the Opposition:
  - Lim Huan Boon (Bukit Merah, BS), until 31 December 1965
  - Chia Thye Poh (Jurong, BS), from 1 January until 7 October 1966
- Leader of the House: Toh Chin Chye (Rochore, PAP)
- Government Party Whip: Chan Chee Seng (Jalan Besar, PAP)

== Composition ==
Party	Members	
Party	At start	At dissolution
People's Action Party	38	49
Barisan Sosialis	13	2
Total	51	51
Government majority	25	47

== Members ==
Constituency	Member	Party
Aljunied	S. V. Lingam எஸ். வி. லிங்கம்	PAP
Anson	Perumal Govindaswamy பி. கோவிந்தசாமி	PAP
Bras Basah	Ho See Beng 何思明	PAP
Bukit Merah	Lim Huan Boon (until 1965) (Note: Resigned over disagreements with Barisan chairman Lee Siew Choh's strategy of extra-parliamentary struggle.) 林焕文	BS
Bukit Merah	Lim Guan Hoo (from 1966) (Note: Lim was elected on 18 January 1966 in the 1966 Bukit Merah by-election.) 林源河	PAP
Bukit Panjang	Ong Lian Teng (until 1966) (Note: Resigned on 5 December 1966 as part of the Barisan's strategy of extra-parliamentary opposition.) 王连丁	BS
Bukit Panjang	P. Selvadurai (from 1967) (Note: Elected on 7 March 1967 in the 1977 Singaporean by-elections.) பி. செல்வதுரை	PAP
Bukit Timah	Lee Tee Tong (until 1966) (Note: Resigned on 7 October 1966 as part of the Barisan's strategy of extra-parliamentary opposition.) 李思东	BS
Bukit Timah	Chor Yeok Eng (from 1966) (Note: Elected in the November 1966 by-elections.) 曹煜英	PAP
Cairnhill	Lim Kim San 林金山	PAP
Changi	Sim Boon Woo 沈文武	PAP
Chua Chu Kang	Chio Cheng Thun (until 1966) 蒋清潭	BS
Chua Chu Kang	Tang See Chim (from 1966) (Note: Elected on 1 March 1966 in the March 1966 by-elections.) 邓思沾	PAP
Crawford	S. T. Bani (until 1966) (Note: Bani resigned on 9 January 1966 following his arrest and release under Operation Pechah.) எஸ். டி. பானி	BS
Crawford	S. Ramaswamy (from 1966) எஸ். ராமசாமி	PAP
Delta	Chan Choy Siong 陈翠嫦	PAP
Farrer Park	S. Rajoo எஸ். ராஜூ	PAP
Geylang East	Ho Cheng Choon 何振春	PAP
Geylang Serai	Rahmat Kenap رحمة كنڤ	PAP
Geylang West	Yong Nyuk Lin 杨玉麟	PAP
Havelock	Loh Miaw Gong (until 1966) 卢妙萍	BS
Havelock	Lim Soo Peng (from 1967) 林树炳	PAP
Hong Lim	Lee Khoon Choy 李炯才	PAP
Jalan Besar	Chan Chee Seng 陈志成	PAP
Jalan Kayu	Tan Cheng Tong (until 1966) 陈清动	BS
Jalan Kayu	Teo Hup Teck (from 1967) 张合德	PAP
Joo Chiat	Fong Kim Heng (until 1966) (Note: Fong resigned on 18 October 1966 due to ill health.) 邝金庆	PAP
Joo Chiat	Yeoh Ghim Seng (from 1966) 杨锦成	PAP
Jurong	Chia Thye Poh (until 1966) 谢太宝	BS
Jurong	Ho Kah Leong (from 1966) 何家良	PAP
Kallang	Buang Omar Junid بواڠ عمر جنيد	PAP
Kampong Glam	S. Rajaratnam எஸ். ராஜரத்தினம்	PAP
Kampong Kapor	Mahmud Awang محمود اوڠ	PAP
Kampong Kembangan	Ariff Suradi عارف سورادي	PAP
Kreta Ayer	Goh Keng Swee 吴庆瑞	PAP
Moulmein	Avadai Dhanam Lakshimi ஆவடை தனலட்சுமி	PAP
Mountbatten	Ng Yeow Chong 黄燿宗	PAP
Nee Soon	Chan Sun Wing 陈新嵘	BS
Pasir Panjang	Othman Wok عثمان ووك	PAP
Paya Lebar	Kow Kee Seng (until 1966) 高棋生	BS
Paya Lebar	Tay Boon Too (from 1966) 郑文滔	PAP
Punggol	Ng Kah Ting 黄嘉腾	PAP
Queenstown	Jek Yeun Thong 易润堂	PAP
River Valley	Lim Cheng Lock 林清禄	PAP
Rochore	Toh Chin Chye 杜进才	PAP
Sembawang	Teong Eng Siong 张永祥	PAP
Sepoy Lines	Wee Toon Boon 黄循文	PAP
Serangoon Gardens	R. A. Gonzales	PAP
Siglap	Abdul Rahim Ishak عبد الرحيم إسحاق	PAP
Southern Islands	Ya'acob Mohamed يعقوب محمد	PAP
Stamford	Fong Sip Chee 邝摄治	PAP
Tampines	Poh Ber Liak (until 1966) 傅孙力	BS
Tampines	Chew Chin Han (from 1967) 周震汉	PAP
Tanglin	E. W. Barker	PAP
Tanjong Pagar	Lee Kuan Yew 李光耀	PAP
Telok Ayer	Ong Pang Boon 王邦文	PAP
Telok Blangah	Bernard Rodrigues	PAP
Thomson	Koo Young (until 1966) 顾泱	BS
Thomson	Ang Nam Piau (from 1967) 洪南标	PAP
Tiong Bahru	Lee Teck Him 李德欣	PAP
Toa Payoh	Wong Soon Fong 黄信芳	BS
Ulu Pandan	Chow Chiok Hock 蒋石福	PAP
Upper Serangoon	Sia Kah Hui 谢嘉惠	PAP
