= 1963 Singaporean general election =

Malaysian state election

- 21 September 1963

All 51 seats in the Legislative Assembly 26 seats needed for a majority
- Registered: 617,750
- Turnout: 95.11% (▲5.04pp)
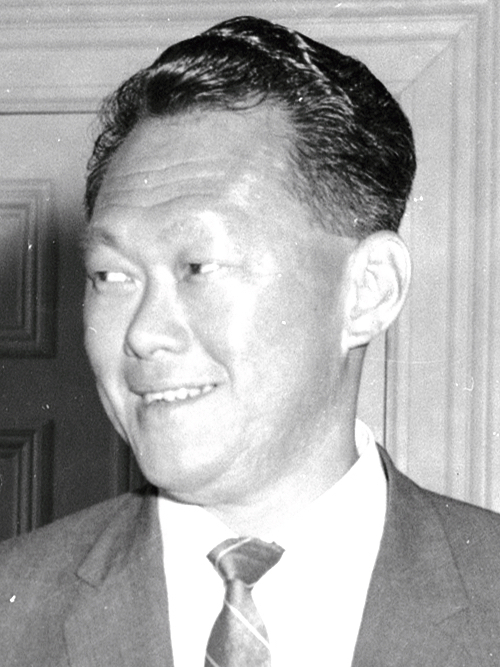
| | First party | Second party | Third party |
|---|---|---|---|
| Leader | Lee Kuan Yew | Lee Siew Choh | Ong Eng Guan |
| Party | PAP | BS | UPP |
| Leader's seat | Tanjong Pagar | Rochore (Note: Lee Siew Choh represented Queenstown before the election.) (lost re-election) | Hong Lim |
| Last election | 54.08%, 43 seats | Did not exist | Did not exist |
| Seats won | 37 | 13 | 1 |
| Seat change | ▼6 | New | New |
| Popular vote | 272,924 | 193,301 | 48,785 |
| Percentage | 46.93% | 33.24% | 8.39% |
| Swing | ▼7.15pp | New | New |
- Results by constituency
Prime Minister before election
Lee Kuan Yew
PAP
Prime Minister after election
Lee Kuan Yew
PAP

General elections were held in Singapore on 21 September 1963 to elect all 51 members of the Legislative Assembly. This was the first and only general election held when Singapore was part of Malaysia as an autonomous state, and just days after it became fully independent from the United Kingdom on 16 September following full internal self-government in 1959. It was also the only election to date without any boundary changes to constituencies. The People's Action Party (PAP) under Lee Kuan Yew won 37 of the 51 seats, while 13 went to the Barisan Sosialis (BS) led by Lee Siew Choh, its left-wing splinter party. The United People's Party (UPP) secured one seat through its leader Ong Eng Guan, a former PAP member.

The ruling Alliance Party of Malaysia led by the United Malays National Organisation (UMNO) contested the election through its Singapore branch (SAP) in an attempt to unseat the PAP, straining PAP–UMNO relations. However, the Alliance lost all seven of its seats which they held in Singapore, including those in Malay dominated areas. In response, the PAP contested seats in Peninsular Malaysia during the 1964 federal election the following year, further deepening tensions and mistrust between the Alliance federal government and the PAP state government.

A total of 210 candidates contested the elections, marking the largest slate in Singapore for over six decades until it was surpassed in 2025. The ruling PAP fielded candidates in all 51 seats, while its breakaway parties, BS and the UPP, each put forward 46 and the SAP fielded 42. This was the last election in which any party other than the PAP contested more than half the parliamentary seats. With the two PAP splinter groups and the Alliance fielding nearly full slates, it became one of the most fiercely contested elections and posed a serious challenge to the ruling PAP. Voter turnout reached 95.11%, the highest at the time in Singapore's history.

This was the most recent general election in which the PAP received less than half of the popular vote, at only 47%, and the last parliamentary election to date where MPs (29 out of 51) were elected by a plurality due to the first-past-the-post voting system. It was also the last general election in which an incumbent minister was defeated until 2011 and the last general election in which all seats were contested until 2015. With the Independence of Singapore Agreement 1965, this election was the only one that was held when Singapore was a state of Malaysia. After independence, the elected members of the Legislative Assembly subsequently become members of the inaugural Parliament of Singapore.

== Background ==
Although the People's Action Party (PAP) had won 43 seats in the 1959 elections, they lost four seats in 1961 (two were from the by-election defeats, and two defected to the new United People's Party (UPP)). A further 13 legislators were expelled from PAP for voting against the government in a no-confidence motion on 20 July 1961; the dissidents subsequently formed a new party, the Barisan Sosialis (BS), alleging PAP as a communist front. The combination of by-election defeats, defections and expulsions reduced the PAP by 17 seats down to 26, leaving PAP with a one-seat majority.

On 3 July 1962, while the integration referendum debate was in procession, the PAP lost its majority following the resignation of legislator Ho Puay Choo, who later joined BS on 11 August. Five days later, UPP legislator S. V. Lingam rejoined PAP, giving it back its one-seat majority. However, the majority was lost again on 21 August following the death of health minister Ahmad Ibrahim, who was the MP for Sembawang. BS planned to field Lim Chin Siong to contest in a by-election, but it was not held.

On 31 August 1963, Singapore was declared fully independent from the United Kingdom (full internal self-government was granted in 1959) with PAP declared as trustees until the merger with Malaysia could be complete. On 3 September, Lee Kuan Yew dissolved the Legislative Assembly in accordance with procedure, the Proclamation of Malaysia was ratified on 16 September, and elections are to be held on 21 September. As part of the Malaysia Agreement, the head of government in Singapore were permitted to retain the title of "Prime Minister" despite there already being a prime minister of Malaysia, as Singapore were given more autonomy in some areas than the other states of Malaysia.

== Timeline ==
| 3 September | Dissolution of 2nd Legislative Assembly |
| 12 September | Nomination Day |
| 21 September | Polling day |
| 22 October | Opening of 3rd Legislative Assembly |

== Incumbents not standing for re-election ==
The following incumbent elected members of the Legislative Assembly did not run in the 1963 election.

| Incumbent | Party | Constituency | Elected in |
|---|---|---|---|
| Abdul Hamid Jumat | UMNO | Geylang Serai | 1955 |
| Hoe Puay Choo | BS | Bras Basah | 1959 |
| Ismail Rahim | PAP | Geylang East | 1959 |
| G. Kandasamy | PAP | Kampong Kapor | 1959 |
| C. H. Koh | SPA | Joo Chiat | 1959 |
| Lim Yew Hock | SPA | Cairnhill | 1951 |
| Lin You Eng | BS | Moulmein | 1959 |
| John Mammen | PAP | Telok Blangah | 1959 |
| Sahorah Ahmat | PAP | Siglap | 1959 |
| Sheng Nam Chin | BS | Nee Soon | 1959 |
| Tee Kim Leng | BS | Pasir Panjang | 1959 |

== Campaign ==
The elections, held in the midst of Singapore's merger with Malaysia, are remembered as the PAP's hardest-fought as the party faced intensive challenges from three other parties that fielded nearly full slates. BS collated with Parti Rakyat, and fielded candidates in all but two seats, while UPP had an unusually large number of candidates. Earlier that year on 2 February, as part of an anti-communist security operation, the PAP government with support of the Malaysian federal government and the British government had launched Operation Coldstore to detain several BS leaders, including Lim Chin Siong, which severely hampered BS.

On the final night of campaigning, PAP officials issued a sudden warning: if BS were to win the election and defeat the PAP, the federal government in Kuala Lumpur might deploy troops to Singapore and invoke emergency powers, bypassing the incoming BS-led government, allegedly due to its perceived pro-communist stance. This last-minute tactic, seen by many as fearmongering, left BS with no opportunity to respond. Nevertheless, it appeared to sway public sentiment and may have contributed significantly to the PAP's victory the following day.

The sole Workers' Party (WP) legislator David Marshall resigned from the party he founded and became the only independent. Another participant was Singapore Alliance, an extension of the ruling federal Alliance Party in Malaysia, which was a coalition consisting of the Singapore People's Alliance (SPA) along with the local branches of UMNO, the Malayan Chinese Association and Malayan Indian Congress. However, former Chief Minister and leader Lim Yew Hock opted not to run in the elections, citing a defamation campaign by the PAP.

== Results ==
In terms of votes, Cairnhill candidate Lim Kim San had the best scoring result of 66.46%; however, 29 out of the 51 constituencies had elected by plurality as a result of first-past-the-post voting. Delta's MP-elect Chan Choy Siong had the narrowest winning margin of 0.46%. A total of 92 candidates lost their election deposits, with the lowest being 0.72%, held by Moulmein's independent candidate Soo Tho Siu Hee.

Popular vote
1. PAP (46.9%)
2. BS (33.2%)
3. SPA (8.42%)
4. UPP (8.39%)
5. Others (1.87%)
6. Independents (1.17%)
Seats won
1. 37 seats (PAP) (72.5%)
2. 13 seats (BS) (25.5%)
3. 1 seat (UPP) (1.96%)

Graph of the party split among 51 seats.
| Party | Votes | % | Seats | +/– |
|---|---|---|---|---|
| People's Action Party | 272,924 | 46.93 | 37 | –6 |
| Barisan Sosialis | 193,301 | 33.24 | 13 | New |
| Singapore Alliance | 48,967 | 8.42 | 0 | –3 |
| United People's Party | 48,785 | 8.39 | 1 | New |
| Parti Rakyat | 8,259 | 1.42 | 0 | 0 |
| Pan-Malayan Islamic Party | 1,545 | 0.27 | 0 | 0 |
| United Democratic Party | 760 | 0.13 | 0 | New |
| Workers' Party | 286 | 0.05 | 0 | 0 |
| Independents | 6,788 | 1.17 | 0 | –1 |
| Total | 581,615 | 100.00 | 51 | 0 |
| Valid votes | 581,615 | 99.01 | | |
| Invalid/blank votes | 5,818 | 0.99 | | |
| Total votes | 587,433 | 100.00 | | |
| Registered voters/turnout | 617,450 | 95.14 | | |
Source: Singapore Elections

=== By constituency ===
| Constituency | Electorate | Party | Candidate | Votes | % | Swing | Margin |
|---|---|---|---|---|---|---|---|
| Aljunied | 16,152 | People's Action Party | S. V. Lingam | 7,745 | 50.90 | +1.50 | 20.51 |
| Aljunied | 16,152 | Barisan Sosialis | Thio Kheng Lock | 4,624 | 30.39 | New | 20.51 |
| Aljunied | 16,152 | Singapore Alliance Party | Lim Koon Teck | 1,681 | 11.05 | New | 20.51 |
| Aljunied | 16,152 | United People's Party | Woo Kong Seng | 1,165 | 7.66 | New | 20.51 |
| Anson | 9,192 | People's Action Party | P. Govindaswamy | 3,957 | 46.90 | –13.85 | 9.88 |
| Anson | 9,192 | Barisan Sosialis | Chan Chong Keen | 3,123 | 37.02 | New | 9.88 |
| Anson | 9,192 | Singapore Alliance Party | A. K. Isaac | 543 | 6.44 | New | 9.88 |
| Anson | 9,192 | Independent | David Marshall | 416 | 4.93 | New | 9.88 |
| Anson | 9,192 | United People's Party | V. Vythalingam | 306 | 3.63 | New | 9.88 |
| Anson | 9,192 | Workers' Party | Chiang Seok Keong | 91 | 1.08 | New | 9.88 |
| Bras Basah | 10,678 | People's Action Party | Ho See Beng | 4,926 | 51.80 | –11.55 | 11.52 |
| Bras Basah | 10,678 | Barisan Sosialis | Leong Kwan Fai | 3,831 | 40.28 | New | 11.52 |
| Bras Basah | 10,678 | United People's Party | Pan Cheng Luan | 335 | 3.52 | New | 11.52 |
| Bras Basah | 10,678 | Singapore Alliance Party | Wong Chin Sen | 304 | 3.20 | New | 11.52 |
| Bras Basah | 10,678 | Workers' Party | Chua Chin Kiat | 114 | 1.20 | New | 11.52 |
| Bukit Merah | 12,225 | Barisan Sosialis | Lim Huan Boon | 4,963 | 42.84 | New | 3.82 |
| Bukit Merah | 12,225 | People's Action Party | S. Ramaswamy | 4,520 | 39.02 | –20.07 | 3.82 |
| Bukit Merah | 12,225 | United People's Party | Poon Weng Ying | 1,129 | 9.75 | New | 3.82 |
| Bukit Merah | 12,225 | Singapore Alliance Party | Shums Tung | 740 | 6.39 | New | 3.82 |
| Bukit Merah | 12,225 | Independent | Ngon Eng Kok | 232 | 2.00 | New | 3.82 |
| Bukit Panjang | 12,997 | Barisan Sosialis | Ong Lian Teng | 5,679 | 46.45 | New | 6.04 |
| Bukit Panjang | 12,997 | People's Action Party | Lee Khoon Choy | 4,940 | 40.41 | –17.90 | 6.04 |
| Bukit Panjang | 12,997 | Singapore Alliance Party | Loo Bah Chit | 999 | 8.17 | New | 6.04 |
| Bukit Panjang | 12,997 | United People's Party | Thuan Paik Phok | 607 | 4.97 | New | 6.04 |
| Bukit Timah | 12,502 | Barisan Sosialis | Lee Tee Tong | 6,173 | 52.39 | New | 10.11 |
| Bukit Timah | 12,502 | People's Action Party | Chor Yeok Eng | 4,982 | 42.28 | –18.86 | 10.11 |
| Bukit Timah | 12,502 | United People's Party | Ong Tiong Kuan | 628 | 5.33 | New | 10.11 |
| Cairnhill | 12,340 | People's Action Party | Lim Kim San | 7,749 | 66.46 | +45.78 | 45.51 |
| Cairnhill | 12,340 | Barisan Sosialis | Lim Ang Chuan | 2,443 | 20.95 | New | 45.51 |
| Cairnhill | 12,340 | Singapore Alliance Party | Lee Ah Seong | 1,467 | 12.59 | New | 45.51 |
| Changi | 11,866 | People's Action Party | Sim Boon Woo | 4,808 | 42.78 | New | 12.30 |
| Changi | 11,866 | Barisan Sosialis | Siek Shing Min | 3,425 | 30.48 | New | 12.30 |
| Changi | 11,866 | Singapore Alliance Party | Syed Esa Almenoar | 1,975 | 17.57 | New | 12.30 |
| Changi | 11,866 | United People's Party | Abdullah Masood | 935 | 8.32 | New | 12.30 |
| Changi | 11,866 | Independent | M. N. Yahya | 95 | 0.85 | New | 12.30 |
| Chua Chu Kang | 8,198 | Barisan Sosialis | Chio Cheng Thun | 3,753 | 48.59 | New | 17.14 |
| Chua Chu Kang | 8,198 | People's Action Party | Lim Kim Hian | 2,429 | 31.45 | –24.84 | 17.14 |
| Chua Chu Kang | 8,198 | United People's Party | Sim Chit Giak | 800 | 10.36 | New | 17.14 |
| Chua Chu Kang | 8,198 | Singapore Alliance Party | Neo Guan Choo | 396 | 5.13 | New | 17.14 |
| Chua Chu Kang | 8,198 | Independent | Goh Tong Liang | 345 | 4.47 | New | 17.14 |
| Crawford | 10,949 | Barisan Sosialis | S. T. Bani | 4,400 | 42.75 | New | 1.87 |
| Crawford | 10,949 | People's Action Party | K. M. Byrne | 4,207 | 40.88 | –26.69 | 1.87 |
| Crawford | 10,949 | United People's Party | Lau Tok Keong | 1,032 | 10.03 | New | 1.87 |
| Crawford | 10,949 | Singapore Alliance Party | S. A. Hsieh | 571 | 5.55 | New | 1.87 |
| Crawford | 10,949 | Workers' Party | Goh Tong Liang | 81 | 0.79 | New | 1.87 |
| Delta | 14,037 | People's Action Party | Chan Choy Siong | 5,417 | 40.53 | –18.92 | 0.46 |
| Delta | 14,037 | Barisan Sosialis | Wee Toon Lip | 5,354 | 40.07 | New | 0.46 |
| Delta | 14,037 | United People's Party | Chen Chia Kuang | 2,233 | 16.71 | New | 0.46 |
| Delta | 14,037 | Independent | Wong Kui Yu | 359 | 2.69 | New | 0.46 |
| Farrer Park | 10,189 | People's Action Party | S. Rajoo | 5,365 | 55.71 | +13.86 | 28.51 |
| Farrer Park | 10,189 | Barisan Sosialis | Lee Chin Siang | 2,619 | 27.20 | New | 28.51 |
| Farrer Park | 10,189 | Singapore Alliance Party | A. P. Rajah | 1,232 | 12.79 | New | 28.51 |
| Farrer Park | 10,189 | United People's Party | Wee Kia Eng | 414 | 4.30 | New | 28.51 |
| Geylang East | 16,014 | People's Action Party | Ho Cheng Choon | 7,165 | 47.28 | –4.67 | 11.72 |
| Geylang East | 16,014 | Barisan Sosialis | Phua Soon Lian | 5,389 | 35.56 | New | 11.72 |
| Geylang East | 16,014 | Singapore Alliance Party | Ng Cheng Chwee | 1,467 | 9.68 | New | 11.72 |
| Geylang East | 16,014 | United People's Party | Tan Peng Seah | 1,134 | 7.48 | New | 11.72 |
| Geylang Serai | 15,302 | People's Action Party | Rahamat Kenap | 6,722 | 48.01 | +17.56 | 12.16 |
| Geylang Serai | 15,302 | Singapore Alliance Party | Ahmad Haji Taff | 5,019 | 35.85 | New | 12.16 |
| Geylang Serai | 15,302 | Pan-Malayan Islamic Party | Mohamed Taha Suhaimi | 1,201 | 8.58 | +4.92 | 12.16 |
| Geylang Serai | 15,302 | Independent | Darus Shariff | 1,059 | 7.56 | New | 12.16 |
| Geylang West | 15,386 | People's Action Party | Yong Nyuk Lin | 6,288 | 43.63 | –23.97 | 4.29 |
| Geylang West | 15,386 | Barisan Sosialis | Un Hon Kun | 5,670 | 39.34 | New | 4.29 |
| Geylang West | 15,386 | United People's Party | Kum Teng Hock | 1,541 | 10.69 | New | 4.29 |
| Geylang West | 15,386 | Singapore Alliance Party | Mohamed Haji Yacob | 914 | 6.34 | New | 4.29 |
| Havelock | 15,159 | Barisan Sosialis | Loh Miaw Gong | 6,304 | 44.05 | New | 14.90 |
| Havelock | 15,159 | People's Action Party | Wong Chun Choi | 4,157 | 29.05 | New | 14.90 |
| Havelock | 15,159 | United People's Party | Ng Chee Sen | 3,209 | 22.42 | New | 14.90 |
| Havelock | 15,159 | Singapore Alliance Party | Lim Ser Puan | 641 | 4.48 | New | 14.90 |
| Hong Lim | 12,003 | United People's Party | Ong Eng Guan | 5,066 | 44.47 | New | 11.20 |
| Hong Lim | 12,003 | People's Action Party | Seah Mui Kok | 3,789 | 33.27 | –43.75 | 11.20 |
| Hong Lim | 12,003 | Barisan Sosialis | Lim Chien Sen | 2,344 | 20.58 | New | 11.20 |
| Hong Lim | 12,003 | Singapore Alliance Party | Sam Tai Guan | 191 | 1.68 | New | 11.20 |
| Jalan Besar | 13,764 | People's Action Party | Chan Chee Seng | 6,686 | 51.87 | –10.61 | 11.75 |
| Jalan Besar | 13,764 | Barisan Sosialis | Ng Ngeong Yew | 5,172 | 40.12 | New | 11.75 |
| Jalan Besar | 13,764 | United People's Party | Yong Wan Kit | 1,033 | 8.01 | New | 11.75 |
| Jalan Kayu | 9,164 | Barisan Sosialis | Tan Cheng Tong | 3,312 | 38.04 | New | 7.31 |
| Jalan Kayu | 9,164 | People's Action Party | Teo Hup Teck | 2,676 | 30.73 | –31.55 | 7.31 |
| Jalan Kayu | 9,164 | United People's Party | Lui Boon Phor | 1,146 | 13.16 | New | 7.31 |
| Jalan Kayu | 9,164 | Singapore Alliance Party | M. P. D. Nair | 1,057 | 12.14 | New | 7.31 |
| Jalan Kayu | 9,164 | Independent | Ong Yu Thoh | 516 | 5.93 | New | 7.31 |
| Joo Chiat | 14,966 | People's Action Party | Fong Kim Heng | 9,300 | 65.88 | +25.25 | 39.40 |
| Joo Chiat | 14,966 | Barisan Sosialis | Leong Keng Seng | 3,737 | 26.48 | New | 39.40 |
| Joo Chiat | 14,966 | Singapore Alliance Party | Seow Peck Leng | 1,078 | 7.64 | New | 39.40 |
| Jurong | 7,611 | Barisan Sosialis | Chia Thye Poh | 3,973 | 55.85 | New | 23.96 |
| Jurong | 7,611 | People's Action Party | Ong Soo Chuan | 2,268 | 31.89 | –38.78 | 23.96 |
| Jurong | 7,611 | United People's Party | Soh U Loh | 501 | 7.04 | New | 23.96 |
| Jurong | 7,611 | Singapore Alliance Party | Wong Tuck Leong | 371 | 5.22 | New | 23.96 |
| Kallang | 16,974 | People's Action Party | Buang Omar Junid | 8,479 | 52.21 | +3.03 | 20.10 |
| Kallang | 16,974 | Barisan Sosialis | P. Oorjitham | 5,215 | 32.11 | New | 20.10 |
| Kallang | 16,974 | United People's Party | Mohamed Shariff Dollah | 1,166 | 7.18 | New | 20.10 |
| Kallang | 16,974 | Singapore Alliance Party | Tan Hock Lim | 969 | 5.97 | New | 20.10 |
| Kallang | 16,974 | Independent | Tan Hai Tong | 411 | 2.53 | New | 20.10 |
| Kampong Glam | 10,186 | People's Action Party | S. Rajaratnam | 4,313 | 44.79 | –20.48 | 2.29 |
| Kampong Glam | 10,186 | Barisan Sosialis | Tan Jing Quee | 4,093 | 42.50 | New | 2.29 |
| Kampong Glam | 10,186 | United People's Party | Harbans Singh | 1,224 | 12.71 | New | 2.29 |
| Kampong Kapor | 11,672 | People's Action Party | Mahmud Awang | 4,554 | 41.93 | –12.34 | 3.66 |
| Kampong Kapor | 11,672 | Barisan Sosialis | Lim Hock Thiam | 4,155 | 38.27 | New | 3.66 |
| Kampong Kapor | 11,672 | United People's Party | Nalliah Karuppiah | 1,143 | 10.53 | New | 3.66 |
| Kampong Kapor | 11,672 | Singapore Alliance Party | Chia Ban Wei | 1,006 | 9.27 | New | 3.66 |
| Kampong Kembangan | 15,787 | People's Action Party | Ariff Suradi | 7,127 | 48.31 | +11.58 | 23.28 |
| Kampong Kembangan | 15,787 | Singapore Alliance Party | Ali Alwi | 3,692 | 25.03 | New | 23.28 |
| Kampong Kembangan | 15,787 | Partai Rakyat | Saleha Mohamed Shah | 2,674 | 18.13 | +16.11 | 23.28 |
| Kampong Kembangan | 15,787 | United People's Party | Ibrahim Jaffar | 914 | 6.20 | New | 23.28 |
| Kampong Kembangan | 15,787 | Pan-Malayan Islamic Party | Mohamed Dali Muin | 344 | 2.33 | –0.44 | 23.28 |
| Kreta Ayer | 13,103 | People's Action Party | Goh Keng Swee | 8,059 | 65.47 | –7.88 | 35.85 |
| Kreta Ayer | 13,103 | Barisan Sosialis | Peter Lau | 3,646 | 29.62 | New | 35.85 |
| Kreta Ayer | 13,103 | United People's Party | Loke Wan | 604 | 4.91 | New | 35.85 |
| Moulmein | 10,670 | People's Action Party | Avadai Dhanam Lakshimi | 5,856 | 58.00 | –10.75 | 27.78 |
| Moulmein | 10,670 | Barisan Sosialis | Tann Wee Tiong | 3,051 | 30.22 | New | 27.78 |
| Moulmein | 10,670 | United People's Party | Neo Hay Chan | 575 | 5.69 | New | 27.78 |
| Moulmein | 10,670 | Singapore Alliance Party | Koh Chiat Lim | 542 | 5.37 | New | 27.78 |
| Moulmein | 10,670 | Independent | Soo Tho Siu Hee | 73 | 0.72 | New | 27.78 |
| Mountbatten | 16,843 | People's Action Party | Ng Yeow Chong | 7,751 | 48.97 | +25.13 | 16.38 |
| Mountbatten | 16,843 | Barisan Sosialis | Fung Yin Ching | 5,158 | 32.59 | New | 16.38 |
| Mountbatten | 16,843 | Singapore Alliance Party | Lee Kim Chuan | 1,865 | 11.78 | New | 16.38 |
| Mountbatten | 16,843 | Independent | Felice Leon-Soh | 1,053 | 6.66 | New | 16.38 |
| Nee Soon | 10,064 | Barisan Sosialis | Chan Sun Wing | 4,914 | 51.33 | New | 16.56 |
| Nee Soon | 10,064 | People's Action Party | How Kang Yong | 3,329 | 34.77 | –38.53 | 16.56 |
| Nee Soon | 10,064 | United People's Party | Goh Soo Ming | 864 | 9.02 | New | 16.56 |
| Nee Soon | 10,064 | Singapore Alliance Party | Yeo Teo Bok | 364 | 3.80 | New | 16.56 |
| Nee Soon | 10,064 | Independent | Lim Siak Guan | 103 | 1.08 | New | 16.56 |
| Pasir Panjang | 6,721 | People's Action Party | Othman Wok | 2,879 | 45.30 | +9.30 | 15.61 |
| Pasir Panjang | 6,721 | Barisan Sosialis | Tay Cheng Kang | 1,887 | 29.69 | New | 15.61 |
| Pasir Panjang | 6,721 | Singapore Alliance Party | Ahmad Rahmat | 1,351 | 21.26 | New | 15.61 |
| Pasir Panjang | 6,721 | United People's Party | Yong Ah Kau | 238 | 3.75 | New | 15.61 |
| Paya Lebar | 13,544 | Barisan Sosialis | Kow Kee Seng | 6,152 | 47.96 | New | 5.85 |
| Paya Lebar | 13,544 | People's Action Party | Tan Kia Gan | 5,402 | 42.11 | –18.70 | 5.85 |
| Paya Lebar | 13,544 | United People's Party | Yeo Keng Wee | 858 | 6.69 | New | 5.85 |
| Paya Lebar | 13,544 | Singapore Alliance Party | Goh Yeow Dek | 415 | 3.24 | New | 5.85 |
| Punggol | 10,294 | People's Action Party | Ng Kah Ting | 4,721 | 47.76 | +1.37 | 18.83 |
| Punggol | 10,294 | Barisan Sosialis | Koh Chit Kiang | 2,860 | 28.93 | New | 18.83 |
| Punggol | 10,294 | Singapore Alliance Party | Tan Jin Hong | 1,320 | 13.35 | New | 18.83 |
| Punggol | 10,294 | United People's Party | Lee Jiak Seck | 984 | 9.96 | New | 18.83 |
| Queenstown | 16,133 | People's Action Party | Jek Yeun Thong | 8,165 | 52.81 | +1.00 | 16.66 |
| Queenstown | 16,133 | Barisan Sosialis | Lee Ek Chong | 5,589 | 36.15 | New | 16.66 |
| Queenstown | 16,133 | United People's Party | Ng Ho | 909 | 5.88 | New | 16.66 |
| Queenstown | 16,133 | Singapore Alliance Party | Lee Khee Loong | 798 | 5.16 | New | 16.66 |
| River Valley | 10,532 | People's Action Party | Lim Cheng Lock | 5,597 | 56.67 | +20.12 | 19.66 |
| River Valley | 10,532 | Barisan Sosialis | Goh Lam San | 2,668 | 27.01 | New | 19.66 |
| River Valley | 10,532 | Singapore Alliance Party | Yap Pheng Geck | 1,156 | 11.71 | New | 19.66 |
| River Valley | 10,532 | United People's Party | Chung Kit Wong | 455 | 4.61 | New | 19.66 |
| Rochore | 11,698 | People's Action Party | Toh Chin Chye | 5,015 | 45.56 | –26.20 | 0.81 |
| Rochore | 11,698 | Barisan Sosialis | Lee Siew Choh | 4,926 | 44.75 | New | 0.81 |
| Rochore | 11,698 | United People's Party | Pan Tiek Tai | 1,067 | 9.69 | New | 0.81 |
| Sembawang | 9,329 | People's Action Party | Teong Eng Siong | 3,745 | 42.17 | –12.52 | 1.74 |
| Sembawang | 9,329 | Barisan Sosialis | Chen Poh Chang | 3,591 | 40.43 | New | 1.74 |
| Sembawang | 9,329 | Singapore Alliance Party | P. Appavoo | 1,197 | 13.48 | New | 1.74 |
| Sembawang | 9,329 | United People's Party | Low Seng Wan | 348 | 3.92 | New | 1.74 |
| Sepoy Lines | 10,046 | People's Action Party | Wee Toon Boon | 4,907 | 52.25 | –6.10 | 18.74 |
| Sepoy Lines | 10,046 | Barisan Sosialis | Ong Chang Sam | 3,147 | 33.51 | New | 18.74 |
| Sepoy Lines | 10,046 | Singapore Alliance Party | Goh Su Chiang | 793 | 8.44 | New | 18.74 |
| Sepoy Lines | 10,046 | United People's Party | Tan Choon Sing | 545 | 5.80 | New | 18.74 |
| Serangoon Gardens | 8,765 | People's Action Party | R. A. Gonzales | 4,456 | 53.40 | +4.47 | 21.07 |
| Serangoon Gardens | 8,765 | Barisan Sosialis | Ng Hui Sim | 2,698 | 32.33 | New | 21.07 |
| Serangoon Gardens | 8,765 | United People's Party | Ng Teo Joo | 736 | 8.82 | New | 21.07 |
| Serangoon Gardens | 8,765 | Singapore Alliance Party | Choy Kok Wah | 455 | 5.45 | New | 21.07 |
| Siglap | 15,915 | People's Action Party | Abdul Rahim Ishak | 9,342 | 62.12 | +27.78 | 44.71 |
| Siglap | 15,915 | Partai Rakyat | Tay Check Yaw | 2,618 | 17.41 | New | 44.71 |
| Siglap | 15,915 | Singapore Alliance Party | Soo Ban Hoe | 1,488 | 9.89 | New | 44.71 |
| Siglap | 15,915 | United People's Party | Ong Jin Teck | 1,365 | 9.08 | New | 44.71 |
| Siglap | 15,915 | Independent | Koh Tee Kin | 225 | 1.50 | New | 44.71 |
| Southern Islands | 5,236 | People's Action Party | Ya'acob Mohamed | 2,764 | 55.41 | +30.07 | 10.82 |
| Southern Islands | 5,236 | Singapore Alliance Party | Ahmad Jabri Akib | 2,224 | 44.59 | New | 10.82 |
| Stamford | 11,628 | People's Action Party | Fong Sip Chee | 5,781 | 53.27 | +4.09 | 19.00 |
| Stamford | 11,628 | Barisan Sosialis | Teo Hock Guan | 3,719 | 34.27 | New | 19.00 |
| Stamford | 11,628 | United People's Party | Lim Chung Min | 771 | 7.10 | New | 19.00 |
| Stamford | 11,628 | Singapore Alliance Party | Lal Behari Singh | 582 | 5.36 | New | 19.00 |
| Tampines | 13,137 | Barisan Sosialis | Poh Ber Liak | 5,976 | 48.33 | New | 19.20 |
| Tampines | 13,137 | People's Action Party | Goh Chew Chua | 3,601 | 29.13 | –44.14 | 19.20 |
| Tampines | 13,137 | United People's Party | Liam Tian Seng | 2,130 | 17.23 | New | 19.20 |
| Tampines | 13,137 | Singapore Alliance Party | Lim Jew Kan | 656 | 5.31 | New | 19.20 |
| Tanglin | 9,239 | People's Action Party | E. W. Barker | 4,424 | 51.07 | +20.96 | 28.01 |
| Tanglin | 9,239 | Barisan Sosialis | Tan Cheow Hock | 1,997 | 23.06 | New | 28.01 |
| Tanglin | 9,239 | Singapore Alliance Party | Thio Chan Bee | 1,738 | 20.07 | New | 28.01 |
| Tanglin | 9,239 | United People's Party | Eng Chau Sam | 336 | 3.88 | New | 28.01 |
| Tanglin | 9,239 | Independent | Ariffin Mohd Said | 166 | 1.92 | New | 28.01 |
| Tanjong Pagar | 11,395 | People's Action Party | Lee Kuan Yew | 6,317 | 58.93 | –12.11 | 25.94 |
| Tanjong Pagar | 11,395 | Barisan Sosialis | Ong Hock Siang | 3,537 | 32.99 | New | 25.94 |
| Tanjong Pagar | 11,395 | United People's Party | Lim Peng Kang | 473 | 4.41 | New | 25.94 |
| Tanjong Pagar | 11,395 | Singapore Alliance Party | Chng Boon Eng | 393 | 3.67 | New | 25.94 |
| Telok Ayer | 13,219 | People's Action Party | Ong Pang Boon | 5,390 | 44.01 | –23.37 | 3.29 |
| Telok Ayer | 13,219 | Barisan Sosialis | Lam Chit Lee | 4,987 | 40.72 | New | 3.29 |
| Telok Ayer | 13,219 | United People's Party | Goh Hong Keng | 1,484 | 12.12 | New | 3.29 |
| Telok Ayer | 13,219 | Independent | Wang Chung Kwang | 385 | 3.15 | New | 3.29 |
| Telok Blangah | 13,263 | People's Action Party | Bernard Rodrigues | 4,949 | 39.82 | –10.59 | 5.00 |
| Telok Blangah | 13,263 | Barisan Sosialis | Jukri Parjo | 4,327 | 34.82 | New | 5.00 |
| Telok Blangah | 13,263 | Singapore Alliance Party | Abdul Rahman | 2,627 | 21.14 | New | 5.00 |
| Telok Blangah | 13,263 | United People's Party | Tan Swee Huat | 525 | 4.22 | New | 5.00 |
| Thomson | 11,336 | Barisan Sosialis | Koo Young | 5,292 | 49.17 | –5.46 | 9.70 |
| Thomson | 11,336 | People's Action Party | Leo Keng Fong | 4,248 | 39.47 | New | 9.70 |
| Thomson | 11,336 | United People's Party | Loo Ka Thiam | 1,223 | 11.36 | New | 9.70 |
| Tiong Bahru | 12,534 | People's Action Party | Lee Teck Him | 5,731 | 48.15 | +0.49 | 16.24 |
| Tiong Bahru | 12,534 | Barisan Sosialis | Soon Dit Woo | 3,798 | 31.91 | New | 16.24 |
| Tiong Bahru | 12,534 | United People's Party | Ng Teng Kian | 1,088 | 9.14 | New | 16.24 |
| Tiong Bahru | 12,534 | Independent | William Tan | 777 | 6.53 | New | 16.24 |
| Tiong Bahru | 12,534 | Singapore Alliance Party | Tan Kok Siong | 508 | 4.27 | New | 16.24 |
| Toa Payoh | 13,394 | Barisan Sosialis | Wong Soon Fong | 6,083 | 48.20 | New | 14.32 |
| Toa Payoh | 13,394 | People's Action Party | Yip Sai Weng | 4,276 | 33.88 | –43.78 | 14.32 |
| Toa Payoh | 13,394 | United People's Party | Goh Nee Kim | 1,501 | 11.89 | New | 14.32 |
| Toa Payoh | 13,394 | United Democratic Party | Tan Chor Yong | 760 | 6.03 | New | 14.32 |
| Ulu Pandan | 11,866 | People's Action Party | Chow Chiok Hock | 5,000 | 44.86 | –0.58 | 18.24 |
| Ulu Pandan | 11,866 | Partai Rakyat | Johari Sonto | 2,967 | 26.62 | New | 18.24 |
| Ulu Pandan | 11,866 | Singapore Alliance Party | Anang Haji Abdul Manan | 1,729 | 15.51 | New | 18.24 |
| Ulu Pandan | 11,866 | United People's Party | Ler Chin Tee | 1,450 | 13.01 | New | 18.24 |
| Upper Serangoon | 12,433 | People's Action Party | Sia Kah Hui | 6,650 | 56.56 | +11.50 | 26.39 |
| Upper Serangoon | 12,433 | Barisan Sosialis | Chia Yang Loong | 3,547 | 30.17 | New | 26.39 |
| Upper Serangoon | 12,433 | United People's Party | Phua Gek Boon | 595 | 5.06 | New | 26.39 |
| Upper Serangoon | 12,433 | Independent | Lim Choon Mong | 573 | 4.87 | New | 26.39 |
| Upper Serangoon | 12,433 | Singapore Alliance Party | Wu Moh Chye | 393 | 3.34 | New | 26.39 |
Source: ELD, Singapore Elections, The Straits Times

== Incumbents defeated ==
| Incumbent | | Constituency | Elected in | Winner | |
| Name | Party | Constituency | Elected in | Name | Party |
|---|---|---|---|---|---|
| Ali Alwi | SAP | Kampong Kembangan | 1959 | Ariff Suradi | PAP |
| K. M. Byrne | PAP | Crawford | 1959 | S. T. Bani | BS |
| Chor Yeok Eng | PAP | Jurong (ran in Bukit Timah) | 1959 | Lee Tee Tong | BS |
| Fung Yin Ching | BS | Stamford (ran in Mountbatten) | 1959 | Ng Yeow Chong | PAP |
| Goh Chew Chua | PAP | Tampines | 1955 | Poh Ber Liak | BS |
| Ahmad Jabri Akib | SAP | Southern Islands | 1959 | Ya'acob Mohamed | PAP |
| Lee Khoon Choy | PAP | Bukit Panjang | 1959 | Ong Lian Teng | BS |
| Lee Siew Choh | BS | Queenstown (ran in Rochore) | 1959 | Toh Chin Chye | PAP |
| Leong Keng Seng | BS | Serangoon Gardens (ran in Joo Chiat) | 1959 | Fong Kim Heng | PAP |
| David Marshall | Independent | Anson | 1961 | P. Govindaswamy | PAP |
| Ng Teng Kian | UPP | Punggol (ran in Tiong Bahru) | 1959 | Lee Teck Him | PAP |
| Ong Chang Sam | BS | Chua Chu Kang (ran in Sepoy Lines) | 1959 | Wee Toon Boon | PAP |
| A. P. Rajah | SAP | Farrer Park | 1959 | S. Rajoo | PAP |
| S. Ramaswamy | PAP | Bukit Merah | 1959 | Lim Huan Boon | BS |
| Seow Peck Leng | SAP | Mountbatten (ran in Joo Chiat) | 1959 | Fong Kim Heng | PAP |
| Tan Kia Gan | PAP | Paya Lebar | 1959 | Kow Kee Seng | BS |
| Teo Hock Guan | BS | Changi (ran in Stamford) | 1959 | Fong Sip Chee | PAP |
| Thio Chan Bee | SAP | Tanglin | 1959 | E. W. Barker | PAP |

== Aftermath and analysis ==
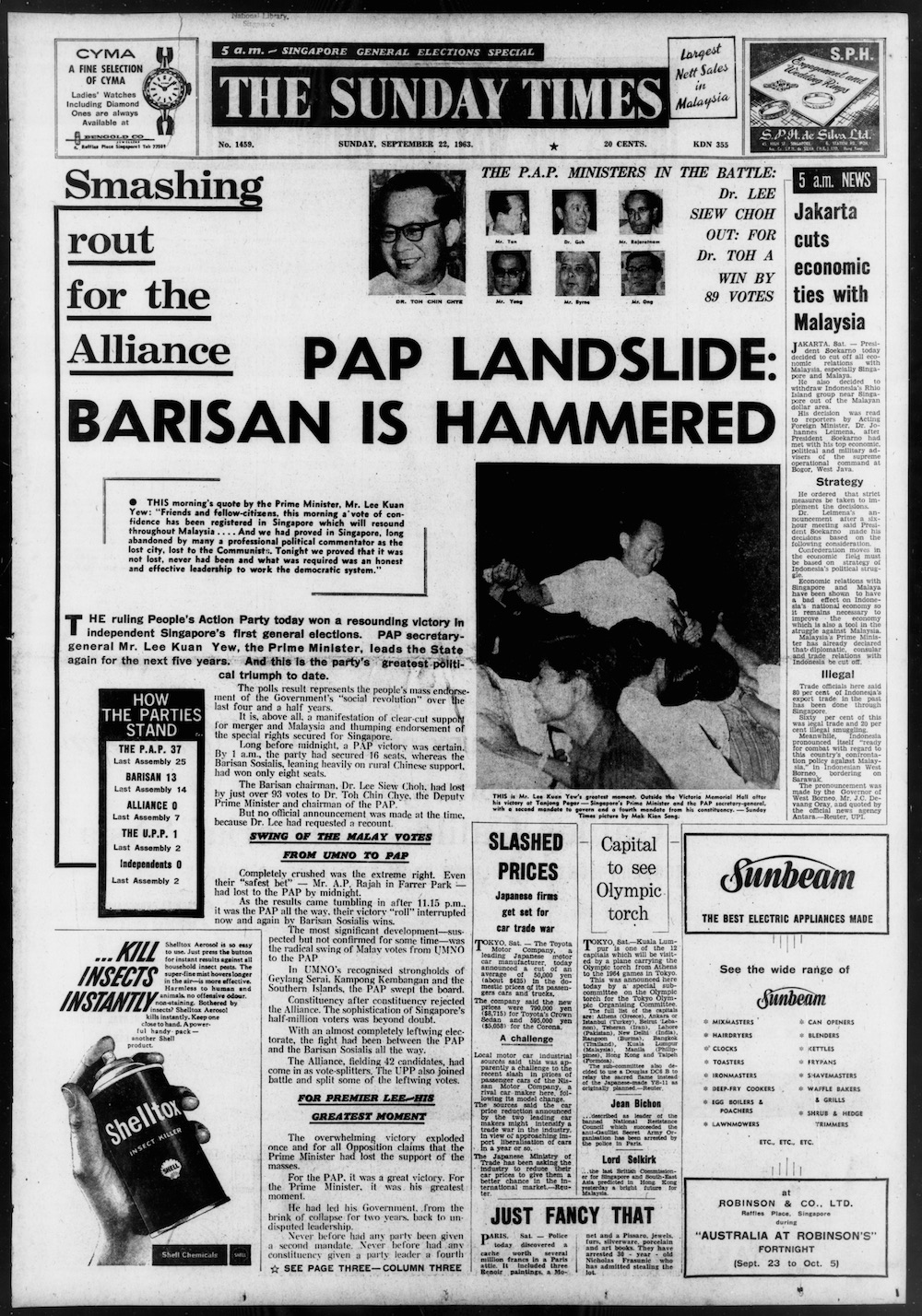
The Sunday Times the day after the 1963 election, reporting on the results.

The PAP won a landslide victory, securing 37 seats and retaining its two-thirds majority in the Legislative Assembly. This result had been uncertain in the lead-up to the vote, and while the PAP emerged as the clear winner, its overall vote share was only 46.93%, the lowest in its history. Several key factors contributed to this outcome despite strong competition from BS. One major reason was the PAP's last-minute warning that if BS formed the government, the federal government in Kuala Lumpur could respond by sending troops into Singapore and enforcing emergency powers. Many voters were also concerned that BS' opposition to merger with Malaya would jeopardise such negotiations. Support for merger was strong among the public, and BS' alignment with Indonesia and the Communist Party of Indonesia (PKI) raised further alarm, especially as Indonesia had declared a Konfrontasi and begun provocative military activity in Borneo.

The English-educated middle class, worried about the rise of communism, voted tactically for the PAP after the left-wing split that created BS. The PAP also gained credit for its achievements in government since 1959. These included the construction of 26,000 flats by the Housing and Development Board (HDB), a reduction in unemployment and expanded investment in public services. Many voters saw continued PAP rule as essential for stability and progress. Although the opposition secured a total of 14 seats, both BS and UPP failed to win most of the constituencies they contested because of the split among anti-PAP voters. Additionally, 16 incumbent candidates were defeated, and the PAP experienced some notable losses, including cabinet ministers K. M. Byrne and Tan Kia Gan in Crawford and Paya Lebar respectively, marking the first time a cabinet minister had lost in their own constituency. This would not happen again until 2011, 48 years and 11 elections later, when cabinet ministers Lim Hwee Hua and George Yeo were defeated in their constituency of Aljunied.

In the aftermath of the election, the PAP government passed a constitutional amendment stipulating that legislators who resign or are expelled from the parties they were elected under would lose their seats, in order to discourage future defections. As a result, by-elections were subsequently held in Hong Lim in 1965, seven constituencies in 1966 and five constituencies in 1967. Those victories resulted PAP in achieving a parliament monopoly that would last for the next 15 years until the first elected opposition MP in 1981. The changes during the 1963–1968 parliamentary term remains the biggest turnover of MPs in post-independence Singapore.

=== Federal government response ===
The Singapore Alliance Party also lost all seven seats it had held before dissolution. The federal Malaysian prime minister Tunku Abdul Rahman and the rest of UMNO were shocked by the Alliance's wipeout in the election. The Alliance which ruled the federal government had expected strong support from the Malay Singaporean electorate, as was the case in Peninsular Malaysia, but the PAP swept all of UMNO's Malay dominated constituencies, including Kampong Kembangan, Geylang Serai and the Southern Islands. Tunku attributed the setback to "traitors" within Singapore UMNO and among sections of the Singaporean Malay community. On 27 September, Tunku declared that he would "personally direct" UMNO's affairs in Singapore and play "an important part" in its future election campaigns. This deepened mistrust between the PAP state government and the Malaysian federal government, and became one of the factors leading to Singapore's expulsion two years later.

The Secretary General of UMNO, Syed Jaafar Albar, reacted even more strongly to the defeat, publicly vowing in the Malaysian federal parliament to "fix" Lee Kuan Yew using "both words and fists". Other Malay extremists delivered equally heated speeches at various meetings and alleged that the PAP had "intimidated" Malays into voting against UMNO, with some even burning an effigy of Lee at a meeting in Singapore to display their anger. The Singapore Alliance became dormant in 1965, and the Singapore People's Alliance, one of its membership parties, was dissolved on 16 May 1965, shortly before Singapore's independence from Malaysia on 9 August 1965.

=== Distribution of Singapore's seats in the Dewan Rakyat ===
The distribution of 15 seats from Singapore in Malaysia's lower house of Parliament, the Dewan Rakyat, was based on the outcome of the election. PAP was allocated 12, which were given to Prime Minister Lee, Deputy Prime Minister Toh Chin Chye, ministers Goh Keng Swee, Ong Pang Boon, S. Rajaratnam, Yong Nyuk Lin, Jek Yeun Thong, Lim Kim San, Othman Wok and assembly members Abdul Rahim Ishak, Wee Toon Boon and Ho See Beng. BS was allocated 3, which were given to Chia Thye Poh, Lim Huan Boon and Kow Kee Seng.

== See also ==
- List of Singaporean electoral divisions (1963–68)
