= List of Singaporean electoral divisions (1963–1968) =

The following is a list of Singaporean electoral divisions from 1963 to 1968 that served as constituencies that elected members to the 3rd Legislative Assembly of Singapore in the 1963 Singaporean general elections. Upon Singapore's independence in 1965, the Legislative Assembly was dissolved and became the 1st Parliament of Singapore.

== Constituencies ==
District	Code	Electorate (1963)
Aljunied	AJ	16,152
Anson	AS	9,192
Bras Basah	BB	10,678
Bukit Merah	BM	12,225
Bukit Panjang	BP	12,225
Bukit Timah	BT	12,502
Cairnhill	CA	12,340
Changi	CH	11,866
Chua Chu Kang	CK	8,198
Crawford	CF	10,949
Delta	D	14,037
Farrer Park	FP	10,189
Geylang East	GE	16,014
Geylang Serai	GS	15,302
Geylang West	GW	15,386
Havelock	H	15,159
Hong Lim	HL	12,003
Jalan Besar	JB	13,764
Jalan Kayu	JK	9,164
Joo Chiat	JC	14,966
Jurong	J	7,611
Kallang	KL	16,974
Kampong Glam	KG	10,186
Kampong Kapor	KK	11,672
Kampong Kembangan	KN	15,787
Kreta Ayer	KA	13,103
Moulmein	MM	10,670
Mountbatten	MB	16,843
Nee Soon	NS	10,064
Pasir Panjang	PP	6,721
Paya Lebar	PL	13,544
Punggol	PG	10,294
Queenstown	Q	16,133
River Valley	RV	10,532
Rochore	R	11,698
Sembawang	SB	9,329
Sepoy Lines	SP	10,046
Serangoon Gardens	SG	8,765
Siglap	SL	15,915
Southern Islands	SI	5,236
Stamford	ST	11,628
Tampines	TM	13,137
Tanglin	T	9,239
Tanjong Pagar	TP	11,395
Telok Ayer	TA	13,219
Telok Blangah	TL	13,263
Thomson	TH	11,336
Tiong Bahru	TG	12,534
Toa Payoh	TY	13,394
Ulu Pandan	UP	11,866
Upper Serangoon	US	12,433
