= Ng Kah Ting =

Singaporean former politician (born 1940)

- 黄嘉腾

Member of Parliament representing Punggol Single Member Constituency
- In office 22 October 1963 – 14 August 1991
- Preceded by: Ng Teng Kian
- Succeeded by: Constituency abolished
- Majority: 1963: 4,721 (47.8%); 1968: N/A (walkover); 1972: 8,215 (58.1%); 1976: 13,360 (69.4%); 1980: 17,103 (78.9%); 1984: 14,904 (65.1%); 1988: 17,914 (59.9%)

Personal details
- Born: 29 February 1940 (age 86) Punggol, Singapore, Straits Settlements
- Spouse: Rita Teoh (m. 1961)

Ng Kah Ting (Note: Chinese: 黄嘉腾; Pe̍h-ōe-jī: N̂g Ka-thêng; pinyin: Huáng Jiāténg) (born 29 February 1940) is a Singaporean former politician. A former member of the People's Action Party (PAP), he served as the Member of Legislative Assembly and later Member of Parliament representing Punggol Single Member Constituency (SMC) from 1963 to 1991.

== Early life and career ==
Ng was born on 29 February 1940 in the Straits Settlements (present-day Punggol, Singapore). He attended Montfort Primary School and Montfort Secondary School. After completing secondary school, Ng worked as a census household numberer before working as an enumerator (census taker).

He later worked for the City Council as a clerk. Before joining politics, Ng worked as a teacher at Charlton School and afterwards worked as a manager of a finance company and a housing development company.

== Political career ==
Ng made his political debut at the 1963 general election as the youngest PAP candidate at 23, contesting for Member of Legislative Assembly of Punggol Single Member Constituency (SMC) against Koh Chit Kiang of Barisan Sosialis, Tan Jin Hong of Singapore Alliance Party, and Lee Jiak Seck of United People's Party. Ng won the election with only 47.76% of the votes. Ng had since become the member of Parliament for Punggol for the next 28 years, having re-elected in parliament for six more times (only the 1968 election saw Ng being elected unopposed).

In 1984, Ng also donated S$10,000 to the redevelopment of Montfort Secondary School, being an alumni. He also attended the Commonwealth Parliamentary Association with fellow MPs Lau Teik Soon (Serangoon Gardens) and Othman Haron (Geylang Serai).

Ng retired from politics in 1991, having served as MP for Punggol SMC for 28 years; at the time of retirement, he was the second longest-serving member of parliament among the members of the first Parliament, only behind Lee Kuan Yew, who continued politics until his death in 2015.
