= Joo Chiat Single Member Constituency =

Former constituency in Singapore

Coordinates: 1.309°N 103.902°E

Joo Chiat
- Former single-member constituency for the Parliament of Singapore
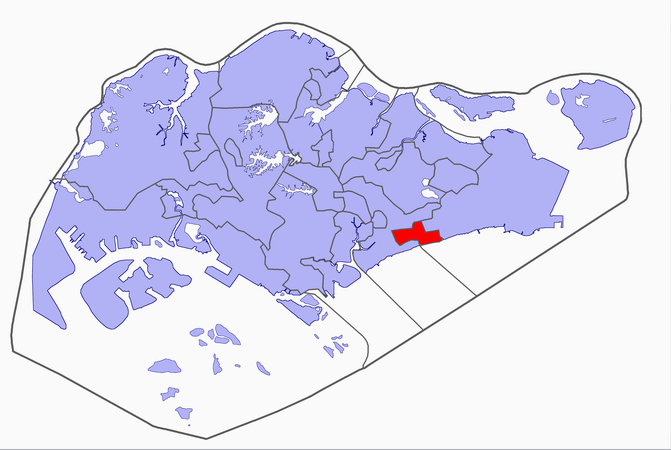
- Location under 2006 boundaries
- Region: southeastern Singapore
- Electorate: 22,069

Current constituency
- Created: 1959–1988; 2001-2015
- Number of members: 1
- Member: Constituency abolished
- Created from: East Coast GRC
- Replaced by: Marine Parade GRC

Joo Chiat Single Member Constituency is a former single member constituency (SMC) that was located in the eastern region of Singapore. The SMC formerly encompassed the areas of Joo Chiat, Katong, Opera Estate, Siglap and a portion of Telok Kurau. It had existed from 1959 until 1988, when it was merged with neighbouring constituencies to form Bedok Group Representation Constituency (Bedok GRC). It was reformed just before the 2001 general election after being carved out from East Coast Group Representation Constituency. The seat was held by the People's Action Party since its reformation that year and was contested again in 2006. Ultimately, the constituency was merged into the Marine Parade GRC prior to the 2015 general election.

== History ==
Bukit Panjang and Mountbatten currently share the roots where it has been interrupted due to Group Representation Constituency system, where it had been merged into the respective bigger constituencies at different times. No other constituencies has survived longer without the interruption after Chua Chu Kang had been merged into Chua Chu Kang GRC.

Prior to the 2015 general election, the constituency was merged into Marine Parade GRC.

== Member of Parliament ==
Year	Member	Party
Formation
Legislative Assembly of Singapore
1959	Koh Choon Hong	SPA
1963	Fong Kim Heng	PAP
Parliament of Singapore
1966	Yeoh Ghim Seng	PAP
1968	Yeoh Ghim Seng	PAP
1972	Yeoh Ghim Seng	PAP
1976	Yeoh Ghim Seng	PAP
1980	Yeoh Ghim Seng	PAP
1984	Yeoh Ghim Seng	PAP
Constituency abolished (1988 – 2001)
2001	Chan Soo Sen	PAP
2006	Chan Soo Sen	PAP
2011	Charles Chong	PAP
Constituency abolished (2015)

== Electoral results ==
Note: The Elections Department does not include rejected votes when calculating the vote shares of candidates. Hence, all candidates' vote shares will total to 100% at any given election (may not appear so in multi-way contests due to rounding).

=== Elections in 1950s ===
General Election 1959
Party	Candidate	Votes	%	±%
SPA	Koh Choon Hong	6,136	45.87	
PAP	Fong Kim Heng	5,301	39.63	
LSP	Gay Wan Guay	1,215	9.09	
Katong United Residents' Association	Low Teck Cheng	405	3.03	
Independent	Henry Chong	320	2.39	
Majority		835	6.24	
Turnout		13,674	89.6	
SPA win (new seat)				

=== Elections in 1960s ===
General Election 1963
Party	Candidate	Votes	%	±%
PAP	Fong Kim Heng	9,300	65.88	+26.25
BS	Leong Keng Seng	3,737	26.48	+26.48
SA	Seow Peck Leng	1,078	7.64	−38.23
Majority		5,563	39.40	
Turnout		14,214	95.0	+5.4
PAP gain from SPA		Swing	N/A	

By-election 1966
Party	Candidate	Votes	%	±%
PAP	Yeoh Ghim Seng	Walkover		
Turnout		15,760		
PAP hold		Swing		

General Election 1968
Party	Candidate	Votes	%	±%
PAP	Yeoh Ghim Seng	Walkover		
Turnout		12,335		
PAP hold		Swing		

=== Elections in 1970s ===
General Election 1972
Party	Candidate	Votes	%	±%
PAP	Yeoh Ghim Seng	11,669	83.49	N/A
United National Front	William Cook	2,307	16.51	+16.51
Majority		9,362	66.98	
Turnout		13,976	98.1	
PAP hold		Swing	N/A	

General Election 1976
Party	Candidate	Votes	%	±%
PAP	Yeoh Ghim Seng	9,601	74.43	−9.06
WP	Maideen bin Ameer Batcha	3,247	25.57	+25.57
Majority		6,354	48.86	−18.12
Turnout		12,848	97.8	−0.3
PAP hold		Swing	-9.06	

=== Elections in 1980s ===
General Election 1980
Party	Candidate	Votes	%	±%
PAP	Yeoh Ghim Seng	8,542	74.18	−0.25
SDP	Soon Kia Seng	2,973	25.82	+25.82
Majority		5,569	48.36	
Turnout		11,515	97.8	0.0
PAP hold		Swing	-0.25	

General Election 1984
Party	Candidate	Votes	%	±%
PAP	Yeoh Ghim Seng	Walkover		
Turnout		18,987		
PAP hold		Swing		

=== Elections in 2000s ===
General Election 2001
Party	Candidate	Votes	%	±%
PAP	Chan Soo Sen	15,426	83.55	N/A
Independent	Ooi Boon Ewe	3,038	16.45	+16.45
Majority		12,388	67.1	
Turnout		19,049	87.6	
PAP win (new seat)				

General Election 2006
Party	Candidate	Votes	%	±%
PAP	Chan Soo Sen	12,226	65.01	−18.54
WP	Tan Bin Seng	6,580	34.99	+34.99
Majority		5,646	30.02	
Turnout		19,196	87.8	+0.2
PAP hold		Swing	-18.54	

=== Elections in 2010s ===
General Election 2011
Party	Candidate	Votes	%	±%
PAP	Charles Chong	9,666	51.02	−13.99
WP	Yee Jenn Jong	9,278	48.98	+13.99
Majority		388	2.04	−27.98
Turnout		19,259	98.4	+10.6
PAP hold		Swing	-13.99	
