= 1966 Singaporean by-elections =

1966 by-elections in Singapore

- 18 January 1966 (Bukit Merah); 1 March 1966 (3 constituencies) (nomination); 2 November 1966 (3 constituencies) (nomination)

7 seats to the Parliament of Singapore
- Registered: 13,209
- Turnout: 11,346 (85.90%) ▼10.25%
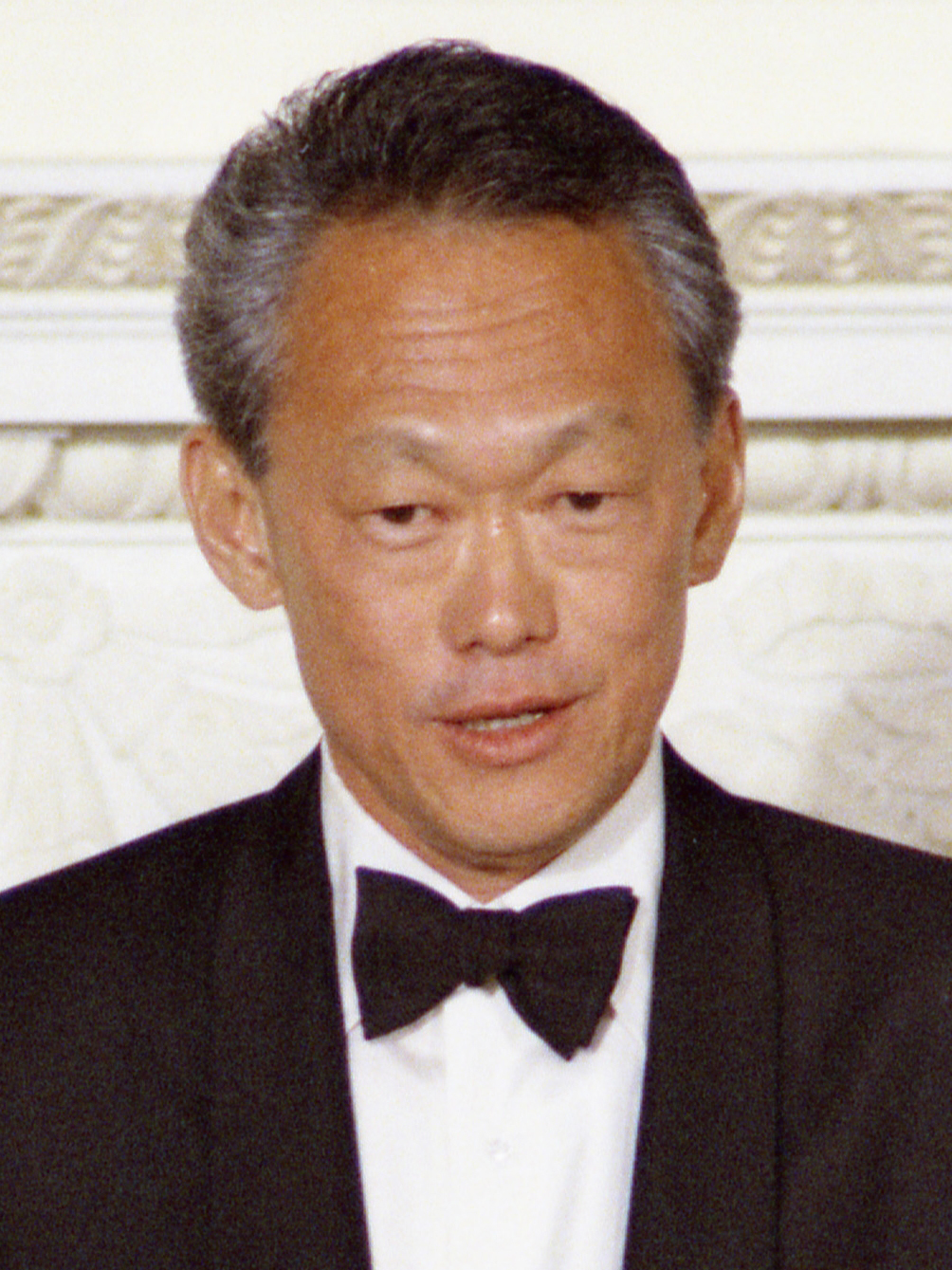
| | First party |
|---|---|
| Leader | Lee Kuan Yew |
| Party | PAP |
| Seats won | 7 |
| Seat change | ▲6 |
| Popular vote | 9,082 |
| Percentage | 82.94% |
| Swing | ▲39.14% |
MPs before election
- Lim Huan Boon
- Chio Cheng Thun
- S. Thentayatha Bani
- Kow Kee Seng
- Lee Tee Tong
- Chia Thye Poh
- BS
- Fong Kim Heng
PAP
Elected MPs
- Lim Guan Hoo
- Tang See Chim
- Sellappa Ramaswamy
- Tay Boon Too
- Chor Yeok Eng
- Yeoh Ghim Seng
- Ho Kah Leong
PAP

The 1966 Singaporean by-elections were held over eleven months from 18 January through 2 November for seven constituencies. All of the vacancies were related to Barisan Sosialis (BS) resignations, which continued into the following year, with the sole exception being Joo Chiat's MP Fong Kim Heng. This was the first election of any kind in post-independence Singapore.

== Background ==
On 8 December 1965, about four months after independence, BS began to boycott Parliament in response to the current legislature and its democracy, which they viewed as "phony". Lim Huan Boon resigned his Bukit Merah Constituency seat on 31 December 1965 as he did not support BS boycotting parliament. By-election nominations were called for Bukit Merah on 8 January. On nomination day, two more MPs, Chio Cheng Thun and Kow Kee Seng, resigned, followed by S. Thendayatha Bani the day after. A further two seats became vacant nine months later on 7 October, with the resignations of Chia Thye Poh and Lee Tee Tong. Two months later on 5 December, five of the remaining seven Barisan MPs, including Loh Miaw Gong also resigned. Another MP, Fong Kim Heng, resigned on 18 October, but Fong was from the PAP unlike the other 11, and cited health reasons.

Chua Chu Kang, Crawford and Paya Lebar constituencies were at stake in the second by-election, with nominations occurring on 1 March. The third by-election were for Bukit Timah, Joo Chiat and Jurong constituencies, with nominations occurring on 2 November. However, these elections went uncontested.

== Results ==
By-election 18 January 1966: Bukit Merah
| Party | Candidate | Votes | % | ±% |
|---|---|---|---|---|
| PAP | Lim Guan Hoo | 9,082 | 82.94 | ▲43.92 |
| Independent | Madai Puthan Damodaran Nair | 1,868 | 17.06 | N/A |
| Majority | | 7,214 | 65.88 | ▲62.06 |
| Total valid votes | | 10,950 | 96.51 | ▼2.55 |
| Rejected ballots | | 396 | 3.49 | ▲2.55 |
| Turnout | | 11,346 | 84.11 | ▼11.55 |
| Registered electors | | 13,489 | | ▲10.34 |
| PAP gain from BS | | Swing | ▲43.92 | |

=== By-elections of 1 March 1966 ===
By-election 1 March 1966: Chua Chu Kang
| Party | Candidate | Votes | % |
|---|---|---|---|
| PAP | Tang See Chim | Unopposed | |
| Registered electors | | 9,918 | |
| PAP gain from BS | | | |

By-election 1 March 1966: Crawford
| Party | Candidate | Votes | % |
|---|---|---|---|
| PAP | Sellappa Ramaswamy | Unopposed | |
| Registered electors | | 10,450 | |
| PAP gain from BS | | | |

By-election 1 March 1966: Paya Lebar
| Party | Candidate | Votes | % |
|---|---|---|---|
| PAP | Tay Boon Too | Unopposed | |
| Registered electors | | 16,205 | |
| PAP gain from BS | | | |

=== By-elections of 2 November 1966 ===
By-election 2 November 1966: Bukit Timah
| Party | Candidate | Votes | % |
|---|---|---|---|
| PAP | Chor Yeok Eng | Unopposed | |
| Registered electors | | 14,854 | |
| PAP gain from BS | | | |

By-election 2 November 1966: Joo Chiat
| Party | Candidate | Votes | % |
|---|---|---|---|
| PAP | Yeoh Ghim Seng | Unopposed | |
| Registered electors | | 15,760 | |
| PAP hold | | | |

By-election 2 November 1966: Jurong
| Party | Candidate | Votes | % |
|---|---|---|---|
| PAP | Ho Kah Leong | Unopposed | |
| Registered electors | | 8,757 | |
| PAP gain from BS | | | |

== Aftermath of 1966 by-election ==
The aftermath of the boycott of the Parliament sparked mass arrests under the Internal Security Act (ISA), including that of Chia Thye Poh, who was detained under this act for 22 years without any trial, becoming the world's second-longest incarcerated political prisoner. Oppositions reached a low point, and Barisan Sosialis would begin to fell apart in the succeeding years.

The People's Action Party government would win every parliamentary seats in ensuing elections for the next 15 years, and to date still remained in power, winning at least two-thirds of all Parliamentary seats. The government would not witness opposition presence again until the 1981 Anson by-election.

The election of Jurong Constituency MP Ho Kah Leong set a record of being the youngest MP-elect in Singapore at age 29, a record which has since been surpassed by two MPs, 27-year old Tin Pei Ling in the 2011 general election, and 26-year old Raeesah Khan in the 2020 general election.
