= P. Govindaswamy =

Singaporean politician (1911–1978)

P. Govindaswamy BBM
- பி. கோவிந்தசாமி

Member of the Singapore Parliament for Anson
- In office 22 October 1963 – 4 June 1978
- Prime Minister: Lee Kuan Yew
- Preceded by: David Marshall
- Succeeded by: Devan Nair

Personal details
- Born: Perumal Govindaswamy; 1911 India
- Died: 4 June 1978 (aged 66–67) Singapore
- Party: People's Action Party
- Spouse: Krishnaveni
- Children: 9

Perumal Govindaswamy (Note: Tamil: பெருமாள் கோவிந்தசாமி, romanized: Perumāḷ Kōvintacāmi) (1911 – 4 June 1978) was a Singaporean trade unionist, politician, and a founding member of the People's Action Party, serving as Member of Legislative Assembly and later Member of Parliament for Anson from 1963 till his death in 1978.

== Early life and career ==
In 1911, Perumal Govindaswamy was born in India, and in 1927, he migrated to Singapore. He received no formal education.

In 1929, Govindaswamy joined the Postal Service Department (now known as Singapore Post) and soon became involved in the Union of Postal Workers and the Postal and Telecommunication Uniformed Staff Union. In May 1952, Govindaswamy was one of the organisers of a postal union strike, and engaged lawyer Lee Kuan Yew as their negotiator and legal advisor. More than 400 workers began the 13-day strike on 13 May 1952. Lee was able to negotiate a settlement resulting in pay increase and better working conditions.

In 1963, Govindaswamy retired from the department as inspector of posts.

== Political career ==
Upon retirement from the postal service, Govindaswamy stood for the Legislative Assembly at the 1963 general elections in the constituency of Anson. He won 46.9% of the votes cast and was elected to the 3rd Legislative Assembly.

In the 1968 general elections, Govindaswamy was the only candidate contesting in the constituency of Anson, and was elected unopposed to the 2nd Parliament.

In 1971, rumours alleged that some applicants were able to receive their Housing and Development Board (HDB) flats earlier than others "if they are willing to pay". As the chairman of the committee overseeing allocation of HDB flats, Govindaswamy said such allegations were untrue, and elaborated in his speech at a balloting exercise:

The board's first-come-first-served policy has always been followed and in every balloting, the cards are checked and sealed in envelopes by me personally. The allocation of flats is based strictly on Housing Board rules and regulations.
The rumours might have been spread by people who did not understand the rules of the board or by people with malicious intention of damaging the good name of the Board.
Action can be taken by the police to charge these people in court for spreading malicious rumours.

In the 1972 general elections, Govindaswamy won 74.3% of the votes cast and was elected to the 3rd Parliament. The other two candidates were Tay Kim Oh from Workers' Party and Paul C. Kunjuraman from United National Front.

In 1975, during a debate in Parliament about conducting feasibility studies into the Mass Rapid Transit (MRT) system, Minister for Communications Yong Nyuk Lin announced that the cost of the studies was expected to be S$4.5 million. Govindaswamy felt that there was no need to waste "good money" on research into the MRT system as the Government was already improving the existing public transport system, and the money could be diverted to other projects. MP for Moulmein Lawrence Sia disagreed with Govindaswamy, and felt that the MRT system should be introduced as soon as possible to cope with the increasing reliance on public transport.

Once again, in the 1976 general elections, as the sole candidate for Anson, Govindaswamy was elected unopposed to the 4th Parliament.

In 1978, Minister for Culture Ong Teng Cheong was addressing criticisms of Radio Television Singapore (RTS). Govindaswamy complained of discrimination by RTS against Indians as not many Indians were hired as staff, and that Tamil listeners were neglected by RTS as football matches were not broadcast in Tamil.

== Personal life ==
Together with his wife, Krishnaveni, they had four children, as well as five adopted children.

Govindaswamy lived in the Windsor Park estate, off Upper Thomson Road. In 1971, Govindaswamy was elected as the president of the estate's association. On 12 March 1972, Prime Minister Lee Kuan Yew was accompanied by Govindaswamy to officiate the opening of the estate's S$18,000 clubhouse located at 2 Jupiter Road. In 1974, he was re-elected as president. The clubhouse was demolished in 2000 and a terraced house subdivided into three units was constructed on the site.

On 4 June 1978, after complaining of chest pains and difficulty of breathing, Govindaswamy was sent to Toa Payoh Hospital. He died of a heart attack on the way to the hospital. In a condolence message to his widow, Lee described Govindaswamy as "an old and treasured friend" that was a "responsible, firm and steady leader" who always spoke from his heart, representing the constituents of Anson with sincerity by looking after their interests. On 6 June 1978, Acting Prime Minister and Defence Minister Goh Keng Swee led ministers and MPs at the funeral service held at Mount Vernon Columbarium, paying their last respects.

His wife died on 22 October 1999.

== Awards and decorations ==
After his death, Govindaswamy was posthumously awarded the Public Service Star, and the award was received by his wife.

- Public Service Star, in 1978.

== Notes ==
Parliament of Singapore
| Preceded by David Marshall | Member of Parliament for Anson; 1968 – 1978 | Succeeded by Devan Nair |
