= 1965 Hong Lim by-election =

By-election to determine the representative of Hong Lim constituency

- 10 July 1965
- Registered: 11,837
- Turnout: 10,858 (91.73%) ▼3.77%
	Majority party	Minority party
Candidate	Lee Khoon Choy	Ong Chang Sam
Party	PAP	BS
Popular vote	6,398	4,346
Percentage	59.55%	40.45%
Swing	▲26.28%	▲19.87%
Assemblyman before election
Ong Eng Guan
UPP
Elected Assemblyman
Lee Khoon Choy
PAP

The by-election was held on 10 July 1965, with the nomination day held on 30 June 1965. Legislative Assembly member and chief of United People's Party Ong Eng Guan resigned his seat, precipitating a by-election for the Hong Lim Constituency. This is the last by-election (and in any of the elections) for the Legislative Assembly prior to Singapore's expulsion from Malaysia and its independence. This was also the only by-election of Singapore to be held while Singapore was in Malaysian Federation.

== Background ==
Ong Eng Guan was a two-time Assembly Member who first elected in Hong Lim in the 1959 election, then under the People's Action Party (PAP) banner. Upon his expulsion from the PAP in 1961, he resigned his seat of Hong Lim but later won the ensuing by-election as an independent candidate. Ong later formed United People's Party to lead in the 1963 election, with Ong being the only member to win a seat to retain Hong Lim. Ong resigned on 23 June 1965 for his political retirement.

The election marked with several significance as it would be the last election to have a contest between PAP and Barisan Sosialis (BS). The PAP was by then a full national party with a presence in Malaysia, despite winning only one seat of the 11 it contested in the federal election of 1964.

== Results ==
By-election 10 July 1965: Hong Lim
Candidate	Party	Votes	%	+/–
Lee Khoon Choy	People's Action Party	6,398	59.55	+26.2
Ong Chang Sam	Barisan Sosialis	4,346	40.45	+19.9
Total		10,744	100.00	–
Valid votes		10,744	98.95	
Invalid/blank votes		114	1.05	
Total votes		10,858	100.00	
Registered voters/turnout		11,837	91.73	+0.7
Majority		2,052	19	N/A
People's Action Party gain from United People's Party				

== Aftermath ==
After Singapore left the Malaysian federation on 9 August, the Legislative Assembly was converted into Parliament of Singapore. The following year, Barisan Sosialis begin to collapse following a passage of a constitutional amendment that legislators who resign or are expelled from the parties would also have their seats vacated; 11 of the 13 seats were vacated as a result; the last two of the BS MPs, Chan Sun Wing and Wong Soon Fong, left their seats upon the dissolution of the parliament in 1968. That same year, BS announced on boycotting the election, allowing PAP to achieve a monopoly. BS would ultimately met their fate in May 1988 and were merged into Workers' Party.

PAP's sole Malaysian legislator, Devan Nair, converted the party's extension into the Peninsular Malaysia into the Democratic Action Party (DAP), replacing the "thunderflash" in the PAP's symbol with a "rocket", but left Malaysia a few years later and returned to Singapore. The DAP remains a political party in Malaysia to this day, being part of the Pakatan Harapan coalition. Nair, however, would enter Singapore politics in 1979 before becoming the third President of Singapore two years later.
