= Aljunied Constituency =

Former electoral division in Singapore

Aljunied
- Former Single Member constituency for the Parliament of Singapore
- Region: Singapore

Former constituency
- Created: 1959
- Abolished: 1988
- Seats: 1
- Replaced by: Aljunied GRC

Aljunied Constituency was a constituency in Aljunied, Singapore that was formed in 1959 and continued throughout till 1988. In 1988, following the establishment of Group representation constituency (GRC) and SMC, the constituency was merged with other constituencies to form the Aljunied GRC.

== History ==
During the nomination day for the 1959 general election, Singapore Alliance's candidate, Lim Koon Teck's nomination to contest Aljunied Constituency was rejected by an assistant returning officer. People's Action Party's candidate S. V. Lingam had objected to the nomination of Lim as the serial number of Lim's proposer was not filled in on the duplicate of the nomination forms. Lim decided to appeal against the objection with an elections petition. As the electoral petition can only be filed after the elections are held, Lim decided not to file the petition as he did not wish the electorate of the constituency to have a by-election so soon after the general election, if his petition was successful. Lingam won the election.

== Member of Parliament ==
| Year | Member | Party |
|---|---|---|
Formation
Legislative Assembly of Singapore
| 1959 | Suppiah Visva Lingam (Note: As Assemblyman) | PAP |
| 1963 | Suppiah Visva Lingam | PAP |
Parliament of Singapore
| 1965 | Suppiah Visva Lingam | PAP |
| 1968 | Mohamad Ghazali bin Ismail | PAP |
| 1972 | Chin Harn Tong | PAP |
| 1976 | Chin Harn Tong | PAP |
| 1980 | Chin Harn Tong | PAP |
| 1984 | Chin Harn Tong | PAP |
Constituency abolished (1988)

== Electoral results ==
Note: The Elections Department does not include rejected votes when calculating the vote shares of candidates. Hence, all candidates' vote shares will total to 100% at any given election (may not appear so in multi-way contests due to rounding).

=== Elections in 1950s ===
General Election 1959
| Party | Candidate | Votes | % |
|---|---|---|---|
| PAP | Suppiah Visva Lingam | 5,701 | 49.40 |
| LSP | Edward Henry Holloway | 5,004 | 43.36 |
| Partai Rakyat | Tang Yoong Chiaw | 835 | 7.24 |
| Majority | | 697 | 6.04 |
| Total valid votes | | 11,540 | 98.52 |
| Rejected ballots | | 173 | 1.48 |
| Turnout | | 11,713 | 88.37 |
| Registered electors | | 13,255 | |
| PAP win (new seat) | | | |

=== Elections in 1960s ===
General Election 1963
| Party | Candidate | Votes | % | ±% |
|---|---|---|---|---|
| PAP | Suppiah Visva Lingam | 7,745 | 50.90 | ▲1.50 |
| BS | Thio Kheng Lock | 4,624 | 30.39 | N/A |
| SA | Lim Koon Teck | 1,681 | 11.05 | N/A |
| UPP | Woo Kong Seng | 1,165 | 7.66 | N/A |
| Majority | | 3121 | 20.51 | ▲14.47 |
| Total valid votes | | 15,215 | 99.14 | ▲0.62 |
| Rejected ballots | | 132 | 0.86 | ▼0.62 |
| Turnout | | 15,347 | 95.02 | ▲6.65 |
| Registered electors | | 16,152 | | ▲21.86 |
| PAP hold | | Swing | ▲1.50 | |

General Election 1968
| Party | Candidate | Votes | % | ±% |
|---|---|---|---|---|
| PAP | Mohamad Ghazali bin Ismail | Unopposed | | |
| Registered electors | | 14,472 | | ▼10.40 |
| PAP hold | | | | |

=== Elections in 1970s ===
General Election 1972
| Party | Candidate | Votes | % | ±% |
|---|---|---|---|---|
| PAP | Chin Harn Tong | 12,861 | 71.51 | N/A |
| WP | Lim Kang Chew | 4,360 | 24.25 | N/A |
| United National Front | Amir Ali bin Mohamed | 762 | 4.24 | N/A |
| Majority | | 8,501 | 47.26 | N/A |
| Total valid votes | | 17,983 | 98.53 | N/A |
| Rejected ballots | | 1.79 | 1.47 | N/A |
| Turnout | | 18,251 | 94.7 | N/A |
| Registered electors | | 19,278 | | ▲33.20 |
| PAP hold | | | | |

General Election 1976
| Party | Candidate | Votes | % | ±% |
|---|---|---|---|---|
| PAP | Chin Harn Tong | 12,230 | 74.88 | ▲3.37 |
| WP | Lim Kang Chew | 4,103 | 25.12 | ▲0.87 |
| Majority | | 8,127 | 49.76 | ▲2.50 |
| Total valid votes | | 16,333 | 98.13 | ▼0.40 |
| Rejected ballots | | 312 | 1.87 | ▲0.40 |
| Turnout | | 16,645 | 94.3 | ▼0.40 |
| Registered electors | | 17,461 | | ▼9.42 |
| PAP hold | | Swing | ▲3.37 | |

=== Elections in 1980s ===
General Election 1980
| Party | Candidate | Votes | % | ±% |
|---|---|---|---|---|
| PAP | Chin Harn Tong | 13,313 | 84.59 | ▲9.71 |
| UF | Sim Peng Kim | 2,425 | 15.41 | N/A |
| Majority | | 10,888 | 69.18 | ▲19.42 |
| Total valid votes | | 15,738 | 97.20 | ▼0.93 |
| Rejected ballots | | 453 | 2.80 | ▲0.93 |
| Turnout | | 16,191 | 95.1 | ▲0.8 |
| Registered electors | | 17,017 | | ▼2.54 |
| PAP hold | | Swing | ▲9.71 | |

General Election 1984
| Party | Candidate | Votes | % | ±% |
|---|---|---|---|---|
| PAP | Chin Harn Tong | Unopposed | | |
| Registered electors | | 19,045 | | ▲11.92 |
| PAP hold | | | | |

== See also ==
- Aljunied GRC
