= Jalan Besar Constituency =

Single member constituency in Singapore

Coordinates: 1.311°N 103.863°E

Jalan Besar
- Single Member constituency for the Parliament of Singapore
- Region: Singapore

Current constituency
- Created: 1959
- Member: Constituency Abolished
- Town Council: Jalan Besar
- Replaced by: Jalan Besar GRC

Jalan Besar Constituency was a single member constituency within Kallang, Singapore. It existed from 1959 to 1988.

== Member of Parliament ==
Election	Member of Parliament	Party
Legislative Assembly of Singapore
1959	Chan Chee Seng	PAP
1961	Chan Chee Seng	PAP
1963	Chan Chee Seng	PAP
Parliament of Singapore
1968	Chan Chee Seng	PAP
1972	Chan Chee Seng	PAP
1976	Chan Chee Seng	PAP
1980	Chan Chee Seng	PAP
1984	Lee Boon Yang	PAP

== Electoral results ==
Note: The Elections Department does not include rejected votes when calculating the vote shares of candidates. Hence, all candidates' vote shares will total to 100% at any given election (may not appear so in multi-way contests due to rounding).

=== Elections in 1950s ===
General Election 1959: Jalan Besar
Party	Candidate	Votes	%	±%
PAP	Chan Chee Seng	7,600	62.48	
SPA	Wong Yew Hon	2,573	21.15	
LSP	Lo Ka Fat	1,488	12.23	
LF	See Eng Kiat	503	4.14	
Turnout		12,297	88.6	
PAP win (new seat)				

=== Elections in 1960s ===
General Election 1963: Jalan Besar
Party	Candidate	Votes	%	±%
PAP	Chan Chee Seng	6,686	51.87	−10.61
BS	Ng Ngeong Yew	5,172	40.12	+40.12
UPP	Yong Wan Kit	1,033	8.01	+8.01
Turnout		13,092	95.1	+6.5
PAP hold		Swing	-10.61	

General Election 1968: Jalan Besar
Party	Candidate	Votes	%	±%
PAP	Chan Chee Seng	Walkover		
Turnout		11,400		
PAP hold		Swing		

=== Elections in 1970s ===
General Election 1972: Jalan Besar
Party	Candidate	Votes	%	±%
PAP	Chan Chee Seng	7,794	83.86	
United National Front	Johnnie Ng	1,500	16.14	
Turnout		9,514	92.3	
PAP hold		Swing		

General Election 1976: Jalan Besar
Party	Candidate	Votes	%	±%
PAP	Chan Chee Seng	Walkover		
Turnout		14,933		
PAP hold		Swing		

=== Elections in 1980s ===
General Election 1980: Jalan Besar
Party	Candidate	Votes	%	±%
PAP	Chan Chee Seng	Walkover		
Turnout		15,058		
PAP hold		Swing		

General Election 1984: Jalan Besar
Party	Candidate	Votes	%	±%
PAP	Lee Boon Yang	9,236	64.43	
WP	Ananthan Balakrishnan	5,100	35.57	
Turnout		14,808	91.9	
PAP hold		Swing		

== See also ==
- Jalan Besar GRC
- Moulmein–Kallang GRC
