= Bernard Rodrigues =

Singaporean politician

Member of Parliament for Telok Blangah
- In office 21 September 1963 – 13 April 1968
- Preceded by: Ong Pang Boon
- Succeeded by: Koo Young

Personal details
- Born: Bernard Rodrigues; 15 March 1933 Straits Settlements
- Died: 17 August 2015 (aged 82) Westmead Hospital, Sydney, Australia
- Occupation: Politician

Bernard Rodrigues (15 March 1933 – 17 August 2015) was a Singaporean politician. Rodrigues represented Telok Blangah as a legislative assemblyman in the 1st Parliament of Singapore from 1963 to 1968. He was a founding member of the People's Action Party and helped establish the National Trades Union Congress (NTUC). Rodrigues argued that making the NTUC effective was in the best interest of Singapore, as it would be a constructive alternative to pro-Communist movements. In 1966, he campaigned for government employees to receive their entitled backpay, clashing with Lim Kim San who discouraged such a move. Rodrigues relocated to Sydney, Australia in 1972.
