= Chor Yeok Eng =

Singaporean politician

Chor Yeok Eng PJG
- 曹煜英

Member of the Singapore Parliament for Bukit Timah
- In office 2 November 1966 – 4 December 1984
- Preceded by: Lee Tee Tong (BS)
- Succeeded by: Wang Kai Yuen (PAP)
- Majority: 1966: N/A (walkover); 1968: N/A (walkover); 1972: 9,475 (33.56%); 1976: N/A (walkover); 1980: N/A (walkover)

Personal details
- Born: Chor Yeok Eng; 29 January 1930 Singapore, Straits Settlements
- Died: 21 July 2016 (aged 86)
- Citizenship: Singaporean
- Party: People's Action Party (1959–1984)
- Occupation: Politician

Chor Yeok Eng (Note: Chinese: 曹煜英; Pe̍h-ōe-jī: Chô Io̍k-eng; pinyin: Cáo Yùyīng) (29 January 1930 – 21 July 2016) was a Singaporean politician who was one of the "Old Guard" members of the People's Action Party (PAP).

== Political career ==
Chor served two separate stints in Parliament. He was first elected in 1959 as the member of the Legislative Assembly of Singapore for the Jurong Constituency but was defeated in 1963. He also served as Parliamentary Secretary for the National Development from 1961 to 1963.

Between 1963 and 1966, he served as Political Secretary for Health.

On 8 December 1965, Barisan Sosialis (BS) began to boycott Parliament in response to the current legislature and its democracy as "phony". On 7 October, MP for Bukit Timah Constituency, BS's Lee Tee Tong resigned from the Parliament. A by-election was held on 2 November for the seat with PAP nominating Chor for the constituency. As the constituency was uncontested by other parties, Chor was elected as the MP for Bukit Timah Constituency and served from 1966 to 1984. Chor was largely uncontested for his tenure except during the 1972 Singaporean general election where K. K. Nair of BS challenged the seat. Chor won the election with 9,475 votes, or 66.78 percent of the votes, and remained the MP for Bukit Timah.

Chor also served as Parliamentary Secretary for Health from 1966 to 1972 and Senior Parliamentary Secretary for Environment for 1972 to 1982.

Chor was the Chairman of People's Action Party Bukit Timah Branch in 1979.

== Personal life ==
Chor has three daughters, two sons, three grandsons and two great-grandsons.

In 2015, Chor was diagnosed with aplastic anemia. He died on 21 July 2016 at Singapore General Hospital.

== Honours and awards ==
- 1990 Meritorius Service Medal

== Bibliography ==
- Lam, Peng Er and Tan, Kevin (Ed.) (2000). Lee's lieutenants : Singapore's old guard. Singapore: Allen & Unwin. ISBN 1-86508-172-8
