= Delta Constituency =

Former electoral division in Singapore

Delta
- Former Single Member constituency for the Parliament of Singapore
- Region: Singapore

Former constituency
- Created: 1959
- Abolished: 1988
- Seats: 1
- Member: Constituency Abolished
- Town Council: Tanjong Pagar
- Replaced by: Tanjong Pagar GRC

Delta Constituency was a constituency in Singapore from 1959 to 1988. It was originally part of Havelock Constituency.

== History ==
In 1988, the constituency was dissolved following the establishment of group representation constituency (GRC) and single member constituency (SMC).

== Member of Parliament ==
Election	Member	Party
Formation
Legislative Assembly of Singapore
1959	Chan Choy Siong	PAP
1963	Chan Choy Siong	PAP
Parliament of Singapore
1968	Chan Choy Siong	PAP
1970	Yeo Choo Kok	PAP
1972	Yeo Choo Kok	PAP
1976	Yeo Choo Kok	PAP
1980	Yeo Choo Kok	PAP
1984	Yeo Choo Kok	PAP
Constituency abolished (1988)

== Electoral results ==
Note: The Elections Department does not include rejected votes when calculating the vote shares of candidates. Hence, all candidates' vote shares will total to 100% at any given election (may not appear so in multi-way contests due to rounding).

=== Elections in 1950s ===
General Election 1959
Party	Candidate	Votes	%	±%
PAP	Chan Choy Siong	9,301	69.45	
LSP	Lim Ah Lee	2,308	17.23	
MCA	Chia Chee Buang	1,212	9.05	
SPA	N. Munusamy	571	4.27	
Majority		6,993	52.22	N/A
Turnout		13,392	89.55	
Registered electors		14,954		
PAP win (new seat)				

=== Elections in 1960s ===
General Election 1963: Delta
Party	Candidate	Votes	%	±%
PAP	Chan Choy Siong	5,417	40.53	−29.0
BS	Wee Toon Lip	5,354	40.07	
UPP	Chen Chia Kuang	2,233	16.71	
Independent	Wong Kui Yu	359	2.69	
Majority		63	0.46	−51.76
Turnout		13,363	95.20	
Registered electors		14,037		
PAP hold		Swing		

General Election 1968: Delta
Party	Candidate	Votes	%	±%
PAP	Chan Choy Siong	Uncontested	—	
Registered electors		17,715		

=== Elections in 1970s ===
General Election 1972: Delta
Party	Candidate	Votes	%	±%
PAP	Yeo Choo Kok	9,149	70.72	+30.19
WP	Wong Hong Toy	2,186	16.90	
BS	A. Rahim	1,602	12.38	
Majority		6,963	53.82	+53.36
Turnout		12,937	93.88	
Registered electors		13,781		
PAP hold		Swing		

General Election 1976: Delta
Party	Candidate	Votes	%	±%
PAP	Yeo Choo Kok	10,636	76.40	+5.68
UF	Ng Ho	3,286	23.60	
Majority		7,350	52.80	−1.02
Turnout		10,636	71.76	
Registered electors		14,821		
PAP hold		Swing		

=== Elections in 1980s ===
General Election 1980: Delta
Party	Candidate	Votes	%	±%
PAP	Yeo Choo Kok	Uncontested	—	
Registered electors		14,830		

General Election 1984: Delta
Party	Candidate	Votes	%	±%
PAP	Yeo Choo Kok	7,987	58.72	−17.68
WP	Chua Chwee Huat Peter	5,614	41.28	
Majority		2,373	17.44	−35.36
Turnout		13,601	91.90	
Registered electors		14,800		
PAP hold		Swing		
