= Wee Toon Boon =

Singaporean politician

- 黄循文

Minister of State for Environment
- In office 16 September 1972 – 19 April 1975

Minister of State for Defence
- In office 18 September 1965 – 16 September 1972

Member of the Singapore Parliament for Sepoy Lines Constituency (Note: Formerly the Legislative Assembly from 1959 to 1965.)
- In office 30 May 1959 – 15 September 1976
- Preceded by: Constituency established
- Succeeded by: Constituency abolished
- Majority: 1959: 5,352 (58.35%); 1963: 4,907 (52.25%); 1968: N/A (walkover); 1972: 9,160 (81.30%)

Member of the Malaysian Parliament for Singapore
- In office 2 November 1963 – 9 August 1965
- Preceded by: Position established
- Succeeded by: Position abolished

Member of the City Council of Singapore for Kampong Kapor Constituency
- In office 21 December 1957 – 18 April 1959
- Preceded by: Constituency established
- Succeeded by: Constituency abolished
- Majority: 1957: 3,860 (51.8%)

Personal details
- Born: Wee Toon Boon; 25 September 1929 Singapore, Straits Settlements
- Died: 26 May 2013 (aged 83) Singapore
- Resting place: Mandai Crematorium and Columbarium
- Party: People's Action Party
- Spouse: Koh Goh Moy
- Children: 5

Wee Toon Boon (Note: Chinese: 黄循文; Bǽh-oe-tu: Ūi Tûn-bun; pinyin: Huáng Xúnwén) (25 September 1929 – 26 May 2013) was a Singaporean politician and Member of Parliament for Sepoy Lines Constituency from 1959 to 1976. A member of the People's Action Party, he also served as Minister of State for Defence and Minister of State for the Environment. In September 1975, he was found guilty of corruption and sentenced to four years and six months in prison, which was reduced to 18 months upon appeal.

== Civil career ==
Prior to entering politics, Wee worked as an assistant records clerk in the City Engineer's Department. He was also the general secretary of the Singapore City Council Service Union. Wee was re-elected as general secretary in September 1957 but resigned in November to contest the Kampong Kapor ward in the 1957 Singapore City Council election.

== Political career ==
In December 1957, Wee was elected as a city councillor for the Kampong Kapor ward with 51.8% of the votes against Ng Teik Sim of the Liberal Socialist Party. In 1959, he was elected as assemblyman for Sepoy Lines Constituency. The same year, he was appointed as parliamentary secretary to the Minister for Labour and Law. Wee was Minister of State for Defence from 1965 to September 1972, following which he served as Minister of State for the Environment until 1975. He was also acting Minister for Culture from 1969 to 1970. Wee represented Sepoy Lines at the first, second, and third Parliaments of Singapore.

=== Corruption charges ===
In April 1975, Wee was charged with five counts of corruption under Section 6(a) of the Prevention of Corruption Act. According to an investigation by the Corrupt Practices Investigation Bureau (CPIB), between 5 May 1972 and 20 December 1974, Wee had received bribes worth around S$839,000 from Indonesian property developer Lauw Tjin Ho, also known as Atang Latief, through Wee's former schoolmate and Lauw's company secretary, Ong Keng Kok. These bribes included new galvanised roofing for Wee's Greenmead Avenue bungalow, a bungalow in Jalan Binchang (off Upper Thomson Road), seven return air tickets to Jakarta, and bank guarantees to purchase stocks using his father Wee Kok Kwang's name.

Wee was represented by David Marshall, who described his client as a man who had been "quietly led down the slithering path of hell by a snake". At the trial, which lasted for forty days, Wee maintained his innocence and claimed that "in all my discussions with (Lauw's company secretary) Ong, the question of gift, or expectation of gift, on my part has never been raised by me." He explained that he did favours for Lauw simply because he "liked helping people". Wee also alleged that officers from the CPIB had "threatened" his family.

On 2 September 1975, District Judge T. S. Sinnathuray found Wee guilty of all five charges of corruption. He was sentenced to four years and six months in prison and fined S$7,023. Wee was initially denied bail by Sinnathuray. On 5 September, however, he was granted bail of S$100,000 by High Court Judge Thilliampalam Kulasekaram.

Wee appealed his conviction. His appeal lawyer, John Newey, claimed that "there is no provision under any law in Singapore to charge a minister under the Prevention of Corruption Act." On 13 July 1976, Chief Justice Wee Chong Jin upheld Sinnathuray's ruling for four of the five charges. However, he found that the conviction and three-year prison sentence for the remaining charge, which Sinnathuray had amended from the Solicitor-General's original wording of "did corruptly agree to accept (the two-storey bungalow from Lauw)" to "did corruptly accept", was "clearly wrong". The charge was thus quashed, which reduced Wee's sentence to 18 months (three consecutive six-month sentences for three charges and one concurrent six-month sentence for one charge).

Wee's sentence began on the same day as Chief Justice Wee's appeal judgement. However, he only resigned as a Member of Parliament for Sepoy Lines two months later. (Note: Article 29 of the Constitution of Singapore states that in order to be disqualified as a Member of Parliament, "a member who was convicted of an offence must be sentenced, in respect of a single offence, to a term of not less than 12 months' jail, or to a fine of not less than $2,000." However, in the Attorney-General's view, this did not apply to Wee because he had been sentenced to six months in prison on each remaining charge on appeal.) Wee's sentence was further reduced by one-third for good behaviour and he was released from Changi Prison on 11 July 1977. Reflecting on Wee's case in 2000, former Prime Minister Lee Kuan Yew remarked: "It was painful to confront him and hear his unconvincing protestations of innocence."

== Business career ==
After leaving politics, Wee became a director of gambling ship operator Winds Cruises. In 1993, he secured a borrowing agreement with International Factors Leasing (IFL). However, Winds Cruises collapsed the next year, at which time Wee owed the Bank of Singapore and IFL S$1.8 million and S$2.9 million respectively. In October 1994, IFL sued Wee for the S$2.1 million that he owed them, with the High Court ruling that his bungalow would be seized and auctioned off by IFL.

The property was auctioned off for S$4.65 million in June 1995, but the sale was cancelled by Wee and his wife, Koh Goh Moy. In August 1995, when the property was set to be re-auctioned, Koh sued both Wee and IFL, alleging that Wee had made her the sole owner "in consideration of her love" and therefore IFL had no right to seize it. The hearing began in August 1996, but Koh dropped the lawsuit after judge G. P. Selvam commented that it "had to fail", especially since the title deed had always been in Wee's name.

== Personal life ==
Wee attended Victoria School. He was married to Koh Goh Moy, with whom he had two daughters, three sons, and five grandchildren. In 1967, the couple purchased a two-storey, 7,855 square feet (729.8 m^{2}) bungalow at 33 Greenmead Avenue (off Bukit Timah) for S$60,000.
