= Kampong Kembangan Constituency =

Historical constituency of Singapore

Kampong Kembangan
- Single Member constituency for the Parliament of Singapore
- Region: Singapore

Current constituency
- Created: 1959
- Seats: 1
- Member: Constituency Abolished
- Town Council: Aljunied
- Replaced by: Aljunied GRC

Kampong Kembangan Constituency was a single member constituency in Kembangan, Singapore. In the early days from the 1959, this ward was created for the Kampong Kembangan after the dissolution of Ulu Bedok Constituency. It was subsequently merged into Aljunied Group Representation Constituency

== Member of Parliament ==
| Election | Member of Parliament | Party |
Legislative Assembly of Singapore
| 1959 | Mohammed Ali bin Alwi | PKMS |
| 1963 | Mohamed Ariff Suradi | PAP |
Parliament of Singapore
| 1968 | Mohamed Ariff Suradi | PAP |
| 1972 | Mohamed Ariff Suradi | PAP |
| 1976 | Mansor Sukaimi | PAP |
| 1980 | Mansor Sukaimi | PAP |
| 1984 | Yatiman bin Yusof | PAP |

== Electoral results ==
Note: The Elections Department does not include rejected votes when calculating the vote shares of candidates. Hence, all candidates' vote shares will total to 100% at any given election (may not appear so in multi-way contests due to rounding).

=== Elections in 1950s ===
General Election 1959: Kampong Kembangan
| Party | Candidate | Votes | % | ±% |
|---|---|---|---|---|
| UMNO | Mohammed Ali bin Alwi | 4,443 | 38.86 | |
| PAP | Othman bin Wok | 4,199 | 36.73 | |
| SPA | Mohamed bin Haji Yacob | 2,028 | 17.74 | |
| PMIP | Yahiya bin Haji Mohamed Ghouse | 317 | 2.77 | |
| Partai Ra'ayat | Abdul Latiff bin Ibrahim | 231 | 2.02 | |
| Malay Union | Jaffar bin Abdul Ghani | 215 | 1.88 | |
| UMNO win (new seat) | | | | |

=== Elections in 1960s ===
General Election 1963: Kampong Kembangan
| Party | Candidate | Votes | % | ±% |
|---|---|---|---|---|
| PAP | Mohamed Ariff bin Suradi | 7,127 | 48.31 | ▲11.58 |
| SA | Mohammed Ali bin Alwi | 3,692 | 25.03 | ▼13.83 |
| Partai Ra'ayat | Saleha binte Mohamed Shah | 2,674 | 18.13 | ▲16.11 |
| UPP | Ibrahim bin Jaffar | 914 | 6.20 | ▲6.20 |
| PMIP | Mohamed Dali bin Muin | 344 | 2.33 | ▼0.44 |
| PAP gain from SA | | Swing | ▲11.58 | |

General Election 1968: Kampong Kembangan
| Party | Candidate | Votes | % | ±% |
|---|---|---|---|---|
| PAP | Mohamed Ariff bin Suradi | Walkover | | |
| PAP hold | | Swing | | |

=== Elections in 1970s ===
General Election 1972: Kampong Kembangan
| Party | Candidate | Votes | % | ±% |
|---|---|---|---|---|
| PAP | Mohamed Ariff bin Suradi | 9,671 | 57.53 | |
| WP | Othman Abdullah | 5,451 | 32.43 | |
| United National Front | Kamaruddin Hassan | 1,687 | 10.04 | |
| PAP hold | | Swing | | |

General Election 1976: Kampong Kembangan
| Party | Candidate | Votes | % | ±% |
|---|---|---|---|---|
| PAP | Mansor Sukaimi | 8,028 | 64.02 | ▲6.49 |
| WP | R. Murugason | 4,511 | 35.98 | ▲3.55 |
| PAP hold | | Swing | ▲6.49 | |

=== Elections in 1980s ===
General Election 1980: Kampong Kembangan
| Party | Candidate | Votes | % | ±% |
|---|---|---|---|---|
| PAP | Mansor Sukaimi | 11,194 | 78.74 | ▲14.72 |
| PKMS | Jamal Bin Idris | 3,023 | 21.26 | ▲21.26 |
| PAP hold | | Swing | ▲6.49 | |

General Election 1984: Kampong Kembangan
| Party | Candidate | Votes | % | ±% |
|---|---|---|---|---|
| PAP | Yatiman bin Yusof | 12,125 | 55.71 | ▼23.03 |
| WP | Jufrie Mahmood | 8,210 | 44.29 | N/A |
| PAP hold | | Swing | ▼23.03 | |
