= S. V. Lingam =

Singaporean politician

- எஸ். வி. லிங்கம்

Member of the Singapore Parliament for Aljunied Constituency (Note: Formerly the Legislative Assembly from 1959 to 1965.)
- In office 30 May 1959 – 8 February 1968
- Preceded by: Constituency established
- Succeeded by: Mohamad Ghazali Ismail
- Majority: 1959: 697 (6.04%); 1963: 3121 (20.51%)

Personal details
- Party: People's Action Party
- Other political affiliations: United People's Party
- Occupation: Politician

Suppiah Visva Lingam (Note: Tamil: சுப்பையா விஸ்வ லிங்கம், romanized: Cuppaiyā Visva Liṅkam) is a Singaporean politician who served as a Member of Parliament representing Aljunied Constituency from 1959-1968. He was a member of the People's Action Party (PAP). He was also cofounder of the United People's Party before he returned to PAP.

== Early life and career ==
Born in Singapore, Lingam was educated at Victoria School.

== Political career ==
Lingam was a central executive committee member of the People's Action Party.

Lingam was expelled from the PAP alongside Ng Teng Kian and Ong Eng Guan in July 1960. With Ong, he co-founded United People's Party and became its treasurer.

In August 1962, Lingam resigned from UPP. He rejoined the PAP, and was re-elected in the 1963 elections, before standing down in the 1968 election.

Lee Kuan Yew, in the chapter 27 of the first volume of his memoirs, The Singapore Story, said Goh Keng Swee learnt, after Singapore's merger with Malaysia, that Lingam had been a paid agent of the Malayan Special Branch, spying on Ong Eng Guan, before being directed to return to the PAP when it looked like Lee's government was in danger of collapse in 1962. PAP then dropped Lingam as a candidate in the 1968 election.

== Notes ==
Parliament of Singapore
New constituency	Member of Parliament for Aljunied Constituency; 1959 – 1968	Succeeded by Mohamad Ghazali bin Ismail
