= Chan Choy Siong =

Singaporean politician and activist for women's rights

- 陈翠嫦

Member of the Singapore Parliament for Delta Constituency (Note: Formerly the Legislative Assembly from 1959 to 1965.)
- In office 30 May 1959 – 31 March 1970
- Preceded by: Constituency established
- Succeeded by: Yeo Choo Kok

Member of the City Council of Singapore for Kreta Ayer Constituency
- In office 21 December 1957 – 18 April 1959
- Preceded by: Constituency established
- Succeeded by: Constituency abolished

Personal details
- Born: 1931 Singapore, Straits Settlements
- Died: 11 February 1981 (aged 49–50) Singapore
- Cause of death: Car accident
- Citizenship: Singaporean
- Party: People's Action Party
- Spouse: Ong Pang Boon (m. 1961)
- Children: 3 children
- Occupation: Politician

Chan Choy Siong (Note: Chinese: 陈翠嫦; Jyutping: Can^{4} Ceoi^{3} Soeng^{4}; pinyin: Chén Cuìcháng) BBM (1931 – 11 February 1981) was a Singaporean politician and women's rights activist. Chan was one of the first women to be elected to the Parliament.

== Biography ==
Chan grew up in Chinatown. She attended Nanyang Girls' High School, but was unable to complete her studies due to financial constraints. Her father supported her pursuit of an education.

At the age of 23, Chan joined the People's Action Party (PAP), and was committed to securing equal rights for women in Singapore, including equality in pay and for an end to legal polygamy.

In 1956, along with Ho Puay Choo and Oh Siew Chen, Chan created the Women's League within the PAP. She was subsequently co-opted into the party's Central Executive Committee (CEC) in 1957. That same year, she was also elected to become a city councillor.

Chan, and seven other women were elected to the Legislative Assembly in 1959. Chan served as Assemblywoman and later Member of Parliament between 1959 and 1970. She was one of the first few women to be active in Singapore politics.

Chan pushed for the passage of the Women's Charter and a monogamy proposal. In 1961, she created and led the Women's Affairs Bureau of the PAP. The Women's Charter Chan had pushed for, was passed in that same year.

Chan retired from politics in 1970.

== Personal life ==
Chan was the wife of Ong Pang Boon, a prominent first-generation member of the People's Action Party (PAP). Her niece, Cheryl Chan, was elected in the 2015 and 2020 general election.

== Death ==
In 1981, Chan died in a car accident at the age of 49.

== Legacy ==
In 2005, Chan was honored by the Singapore Council of Women's Organisations (SCWO) by being added to the Wall of Fame.

In 2014, Chan was inducted into the Singapore Women's Hall of Fame.

== Awards and decorations ==
- Public Service Star, in 1981.
