= Singapore Alliance Party =

Singapore Alliance
- Malay name: Perikatan Singapura
- Chinese name: 新加坡联盟; Xīnjiāpō Liánméng
- Tamil name: சிங்கப்பூர் கூட்டணி Ciṅkappūr kūṭṭaṇi
- Founded: 2 June 1961; 64 years ago
- Legalised: 24 June 1963; 62 years ago
- Dissolved: 4 December 2025; 58 days ago
- Headquarters: Singapore
- Ideology: Conservatism (Malaysian); Social conservatism; National conservatism; Economic liberalism
- Political position: Right-wing
- National affiliation: Alliance Party (until 1965)
- Colours: Royal blue; Sky white

The Singapore Alliance Party (abbreviation: SAP), or simply the Singapore Alliance, was a political alliance in Singapore. It was formed on 2 June 1961 with the support of the ruling Alliance Party in Malaya along with the leader of the opposition Lim Yew Hock, who saw the merger with Malaya for Singapore to be a Malaysian state synonymous to Penang or Malacca.

SAP consisted of the local branch of Malaya's United Malays National Organisation (UMNO), local chapters of the Malayan Chinese Association (MCA), Malayan Indian Congress (MIC), and Lim's Singapore People's Alliance (SPA). It was notable for contesting the 1963 general election with a large number of candidates but was ultimately unpopular with voters, having failed to win any seats.

On 7 August 2025, the Ministry of Home Affairs had sought proof of SAP's existence along with 13 other political parties and alliances due to its failure to comply with the Foreign Interference (Countermeasures) Act 2021. If there is no proof of existence provided to the government within three months, the Registrar of Societies will deem a party or an alliance as officially defunct. The alliance was officially deregistered on 4 December 2025.

== History ==
The alliance was formalised on 24 June 1963 as the Singaporean component of the ruling Alliance Party in Malaya. Its campaign policy during the 1963 general election was similar to what the UMNO had used during the federal elections. They had alleged that the ruling People's Action Party (PAP) had "manifestly mistreated the Malays", who are a minority race in Singapore in contrast to Malaya. While the SAP also supported merger with the Federation of Malaya and was anti-communist, it sought to extend the same model of communal politics seen in Peninsular Malaysia onto Singapore. Unlike the then-left-leaning and democratic socialist PAP, it was identified with the political right with a more racial focus.

=== 1963 election ===
Prior to the 1963 election, SAP's constituent parties had held seven seats with SPA holding four seats and the Singapore branch of UMNO holding three seats in the Malay-dominated areas of Geylang Serai, Kampong Kembangan, and the Southern Islands. During the 1963 general election, SAP performed poorly among the Singaporean electorate despite contesting a majority of the seats with 42 candidates, and it lost all their seats held by the constituent parties even in Malay-dominated areas. Lim himself, who created the alliance, did not stand for election. Nevertheless, SAP's participation in the 1963 election further heightened tensions between UMNO and the PAP as they had earlier agreed that neither side would participate in each other's elections until Malaya (now Malaysia), which Singapore was then an autonomous state of, became more politically mature.

=== Legacy ===
After the 1963 elections, SAP was left in the political wilderness, which was exacerbated when Singapore ceased to be a part of Malaysia on 9 August 1965. Lim became less involved in Singaporean politics and briefly moved to Malaya, where he converted to Islam and moved again to Saudi Arabia in his later years. The alliance was briefly reformed and re-registered as the "Alliance Party Singapura" in 1966, but did not contest further elections in a now independent Singapore and gradually faded from the political scene. In Malaysia, the Alliance Party was succeeded by Barisan Nasional (BN) in 1974, ruling the country further until 2018. Most of its component parties eventually ceased to operate with the exception of Pertubuhan Kebangsaan Melayu Singapura (PKMS), which subsequently joined the fringe Singapore Democratic Alliance (SDA) and claims to be a party that supports Malay interests in Singapore.

== Election results ==
=== Legislative Assembly ===
Election	Leader	Votes	%	Seats					Position	Result
Election	Leader	Votes	%	Contested			Total	+/–	Position	Result
Election	Leader	Votes	%	Seats	Won	Lost	Total	+/–	Position	Result
1963	Lim Yew Hock	48,967	8.42%	42	0	42	0 / 51	▼7	3rd	No seats
