= Fong Kim Heng =

Singaporean physician and politician

Fong Kim Heng (Chinese: 邝金庆; 1923 – 3 October 1975) was a Singaporean physician and politician. He was a member of the People’s Action Party and served as Member of Parliament for Joo Chiat Constituency from 1963 to 1966. He was also the first chairman of the Public Utilities Board and later served as Deputy Speaker of the Parliament of Singapore.

Fong Kim Heng in 1963

== Career ==
Before entering Parliament, he was active in community work in eastern Singapore, especially in the Joo Chiat and Changi–Katong area.

When the Public Utilities Board was established on 1 May 1963, Fong Kim Heng became its first chairman. He held that position until 1 November 1963, when George Oehlers succeeded him.

In the 1963 general election, he was elected to represent Joo Chiat as a PAP candidate. He later served as Deputy Speaker.

In October 1966, Prime Minister Lee Kuan Yew announced at a rally in Joo Chiat that Fong was unwell and would resign his seat. His resignation was accepted later that month.

== Personal life ==
Fong was one of Lee Kuan Yew's former classmates from Raffles College and Lee brought him into politics.
