= Geylang Serai Constituency =

Former electoral division in Singapore

Coordinates: 1.316°N 103.89°E

- Former Single member constituency
- Region: Central Region
- Polling divisions: Geylang Serai I, II, III, IV, V
- Population: 22,956

Former constituency
- Created: 1959
- Abolished: 1988
- Seats: 1
- Member: 1
- Created from: Ulu Bedok Constituency
- Replaced by: Marine Parade Group Representation Constituency

Geylang Serai Constituency was a single member constituency within Geylang Serai, Singapore that existed in the pre-independence era of the 1959 elections by carving a portion from its predecessor constituency, the Ulu Bedok Constituency. It remained itself all the way until prior to the 1988 elections, when it was merged into Marine Parade Group Representation Constituency.

== Member of Parliament ==
Year	Member of Parliament	Party
Legislative Assembly of Singapore
1959	Abdul Hamid Jumat	PKMS
1963	Rahmat bin Kenap	PAP
Parliament of Singapore
1968	Rahmat bin Kenap	PAP
1972	Rahmat bin Kenap	PAP
1976	Rahmat bin Kenap	PAP
1980	Othman bin Haron Eusofe	PAP
1984	Othman bin Haron Eusofe	PAP

== Electoral results ==
Note: The Elections Department does not include rejected votes when calculating the vote shares of candidates. Hence, all candidates' vote shares will total to 100% at any given election (may not appear so in multi-way contests due to rounding).

=== Elections in 1950s ===
General Election 1959: Geylang Serai
Party	Candidate	Votes	%
UMNO	Abdul Hamid Jumat	7,940	63.09
PAP	Roshan bin Hassan	3,832	30.45
PMIP	Syed Ahmad Dahlan	460	3.66
Partai Rakyat Singapore	Harun bin Mohamed Amin	353	2.80
Registered electors		14,447	
Total valid votes		12,585	99.14
Rejected ballots		109	0.86
Turnout		12,694	87.87
UMNO win (new seat)			

=== Elections in 1960s ===
General Election 1963: Geylang Serai
Party	Candidate	Votes	%	±%
PAP	Rahmat bin Kenap	6,722	48.01	▲17.56
SA	Ahmad bin Haji Taff	5,019	35.85	▼27.24
PMIP	Mohamed Taha bin Suhaimi	1,201	8.58	▲4.92
Independent	Darus Shariff	1,059	7.56	N/A
Majority		1,703	12.16	N/A
Registered electors		15,302		▲5.92
Total valid votes		14,001	97.07	▼2.07
Rejected ballots		423	2.93	▲2.07
Turnout		14,424	94.26	▲63.9
PAP gain from PKMS				

General Election 1968: Geylang Serai
Party	Candidate	Votes	%	±%
PAP	Rahmat bin Kenap	9,363	83.01	▲35.00
Independent	Darus Shariff	1,916	16.99	▲9.43
Majority		7,447	66.02	▲53.86
Registered electors		12,741		▼16.74
Total valid votes		11,279	97.28	▲0.21
Rejected ballots		315	2.72	▼0.21
Turnout		11,587	90.9	▼3.4
PAP hold		Swing	▲35.00	

=== Elections in 1970s ===
General Election 1972: Geylang Serai
Party	Candidate	Votes	%	±%
PAP	Rahmat bin Kenap	6,711	53.59	−29.42
PKMS	Ahmad Haji Taff	4,978	39.75	+39.75
United National Front	Raja Rom bin Raja Jaafar	833	6.66	+6.66
Turnout		12,801	92.5	+1.6
PAP hold		Swing	-29.42	

General Election 1976: Geylang Serai
Party	Candidate	Votes	%	±%
PAP	Rahmat bin Kenap	8,780	66.34	+12.75
PKMS	Amnah bte Kuong Hussein	3,129	23.64	−16.11
United People's Front	Darus bin Shariff	1,326	10.02	+10.02
Turnout		13,543	95.5	+3.0
PAP hold		Swing	+12.75	

=== Elections in 1980s ===
General Election 1980: Geylang Serai
Party	Candidate	Votes	%	±%
PAP	Othman bin Haron Eusofe	13,195	71.99	+5.65
UF	Seow Khee Leng	5,134	28.01	+28.01
Turnout		18,832	94.3	−1.2
PAP hold		Swing	+5.65	

General Election 1984: Geylang Serai
Party	Candidate	Votes	%	±%
PAP	Othman bin Haron Eusofe	14,564	65.57	−6.42
SUF	Mohamed Monsor Rahman	7,649	34.43	+6.42
Turnout		22,956	95.2	+0.9
PAP hold		Swing	-6.42	

== See also ==
- Marine Parade GRC
- Ulu Bedok ward
