= Barisan Sosialis =

Defunct political party in Singapore

Socialist Front: Barisan Sosialis (Malay); 社会主义阵线 (Chinese); Shèhuì Zhǔyì Zhènxiàn; சோசலிஸ்ட் முன்னணி (Tamil); Cōcalisṭ Muṉṉaṇi
- Leader: Lee Siew Choh; Lim Chin Siong
- Chairman: Lee Siew Choh (1961–1988)
- Secretary-General: Lim Chin Siong (1961–1966)
- Founders: Lee Siew Choh; Lim Chin Siong; ... and others
- Founded: 29 July 1961; 65 years ago
- Dissolved: May 1988; 38 years ago (De facto); 4 December 2025; 9 months ago (De jure, official)
- Split from: People's Action Party
- Merged into: Workers' Party
- Ideology: Socialism; Revolutionary socialism; Marxism; Anti-colonialism
- Political position: Left-wing
- Colours: Sky Blue; Red
- Governing body: Central Executive Committee

Party flag
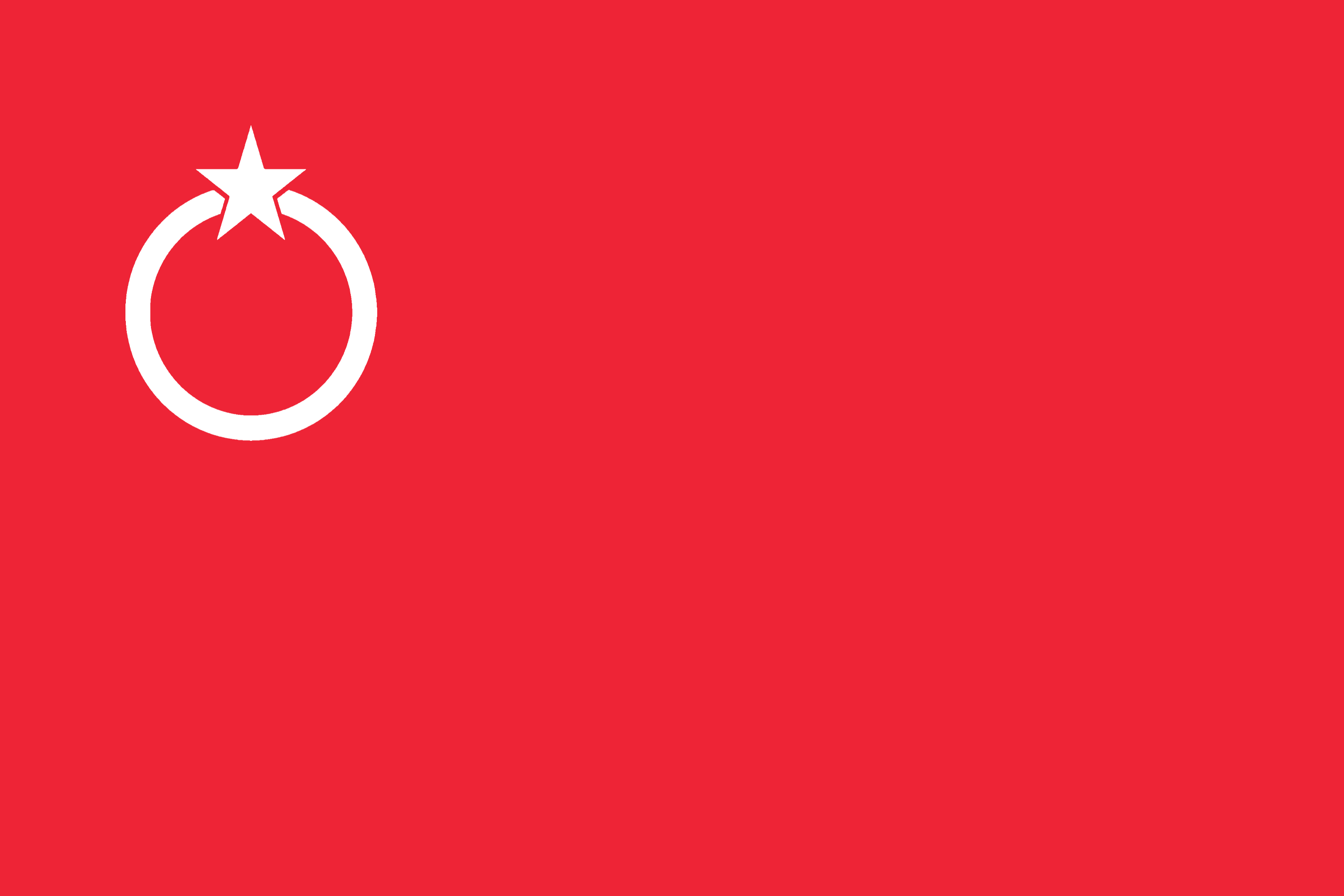
- Politics of Singapore; Political parties; Elections; A: Though officially a left-wing democratic socialist party, the party was widely accused by political rivals and colonial authorities of being a communist front operating on the far-left spectrum.

Barisan Sosialis (BS), also known as the Socialist Front, was a left-wing political party in Singapore. It was formed on 29 July 1961 and was officially registered on 13 August 1961 by the leftist faction of the People's Action Party (PAP) which had been expelled. The prominent founding members of BS were Lee Siew Choh and Lim Chin Siong. It was a major political force and one of the biggest opposition parties in Singapore during the 1960s. It listed its main objectives as "eradicating colonialism", establishing a "united independent and democratic Malayan nation" comprising the Federation of Malaya and Singapore, and "introducing an economic system to promote prosperity and stability in society."

As the PAP consolidated its power during the 1960s, the PAP-led government cracked down on BS, characterising it as a communist front as part of the geopolitical climate of the Cold War. In 1963, as part of Operation Coldstore, over 100 opposition leaders, including Lim, were arrested in preventative and indefinite detention under the Internal Security Act (ISA) with support of the British and Malayan governments. The arrests severely weakened BS, with boycotts by BS MPs to Parliament leading to more arrests throughout 1966 and 1967, most notably Chia Thye Poh.

BS would fully boycott the 1968 elections, cementing the PAP's political dominance. This followed a series of political crackdowns which the government justified as security measures to prevent a communist revolution; for instance, when BS shifted away from parliament in 1966, Chia himself declared that the means of the struggle would be "street demonstrations, protests and strikes". However, these actions were also criticised as political suppression, as BS members did not publicly agitate for communism or subversion during their time as an elected opposition. Despite contesting subsequent elections, BS never recovered from its heyday and most of its members joined the Workers' Party (WP) in 1988. An application for dissolution was denied and the party became dormant. In 2025, it was officially deregistered alongside 13 other parties for a failure to prove its existence while inactive.

== History ==
=== Background ===
Since its formation, the PAP was divided into two main factions: the Fabian, conservative, and technocratic faction led by Lee Kuan Yew, and the revolutionary socialist and Marxist faction led by Lim Chin Siong. The common ground of anti-colonialism and independence of Singapore was the basis for the co-operation between the two factions. Differences in their mass bases also encouraged such co-operation. During the early years, the left-wing faction mainly commanded support from the Chinese masses, rural people and trade unions, while support for Lee's faction was mainly found in the English-educated community. With the support of the working class, the PAP won the third-most seats in the 1955 election and formed the main opposition. In 1959, with the support of the trade unions, the PAP won the election and formed the Government under Lee. However, the two factions were ideologically and politically different in nature. During its formative years, the left-wing members already showed their dissatisfaction with the policies carried out by Lee Kuan Yew and his failure to fulfill his promises to help secure the release of the left-wing political detainees. Finally, the contentious issue of merger with Malaysia triggered the split within the PAP.

On 27 May 1961, Tunku Abdul Rahman, Prime Minister of the Federation of Malaya, suggested the creation of a new Malaysia state consisting of the Federation of Malaya, Singapore, Sarawak, North Borneo and Brunei. The reactions towards merger within the PAP were divided. The merger with Malaysia was supported by the Lee Kuan Yew faction as a means of assuring Singapore's future security and prosperity, while opposed by the left-wing faction as the merger was seen as an attempt to "wipe out the left-wing forces in Singapore" (Interview with Dr Lee Siew Choh).

The rupture within the PAP was widened by the Hong Lim and Anson by-elections in 1961. Displeased with the PAP government's refusal to abolish the Internal Security Council (ISC), refusal to back down the merger plan and refusal to release the remaining political detainees, the PAP left-wingers abandoned support for their own candidates in favour of Ong Eng Guan (in Hong Lim) and David Marshall (in Anson), which led to the PAP's defeat in the two by-elections.

After the 1961 by-elections, the left-wing faction planned to oust Lee from the party but they worried that their actions would cause the British to hold up plans for Singapore's independence. As a result, the left-wingers had a meeting with Lord Selkirk, the British Commissioner-General at Eden Hall, which was later known as the "Eden Hall Tea Party". At the meeting, the left got assurance from Selkirk that Britain was committed to independence and would not intervene militarily to maintain control after the overthrow of Lee's government.

=== Formation ===
On 20 July 1961, Lee Kuan Yew called an emergency meeting of the Legislative Assembly to vote on a motion of confidence in the Government. Twenty-seven assemblymen voted for the government and twenty-four, including thirteen of PAP left-wingers, either abstained or voted against the motion of confidence. The thirteen PAP left-wingers who abstained from voting were then expelled from the PAP. The expelled members, including Lim Chin Siong, Sidney Woodhull and Fong Swee Suan, then proceeded to form an opposition party, the Barisan Sosialis. After the split, 35 branch committees out of 51 and 19 of 23 paid organising secretaries of the PAP went over to BS.

BS was officially inaugurated on 17 September 1962, with Lim Chin Siong as its secretary-general and Dr Lee Siew Choh as chairman. Its founding slogan was 'genuinely full internal self-government' through merger with Malaya and it shared the same aim with the PAP-'the creation of an independent, democratic, non-communist, socialist Malaya'. The main objectives of the new party were presented in following four statements:

1. To eradicate colonialism and set up a united national independent state comprising the Federation of Malaya and Singapore
2. To establish a democratic Government of Malaya based on universal adult suffrage of all those who are born in or owe their allegiance to Malaya
3. To bring into being an economic system that will endure a prosperous, stable and just society
4. To mobilise all sections of the people for the building of a Malayan nation

=== Merger issue ===
While BS did not oppose the merger with Malaya, it campaigned vigorously against the PAP government's merger terms with the Federation of Malaya. According to the merger terms agreed by the PAP government, Singapore would retain its autonomy in education and labour at the expense of the rights of Singapore citizens and seats in the new Federal Parliament. BS wanted Singapore citizens to automatically become Malayan citizens with proportional representation in the Federal Parliament. At the end, the PAP government advocated that a referendum should be held to test popular support for the merger.

The Referendum Bill on the merger incorporated proposals and amendments from BS, David Marshall, Ong Eng Guan and SPA-UMNO. Three offered options A, B, C respectively proposed by the PAP, David Marshall and the SPA-UMNO. However, BS appealed to voters to cast blank votes on the referendum stating that no option correctly expressed BS's thoughts and the three options would "sell out Singapore". This move had been anticipated by the ruling PAP government, as the insertion of a clause that stated that all blank would be counted as a vote for the option that wins the most votes if there was no outright majority or that blank votes would be counted as Option A.

The Referendum on Merger was held on 1 September 1962, and the results were 95.82% voted for Option A proposed by the PAP. As the blank votes are considered as Option A, BS's plan was defeated.

=== Operation Coldstore ===
Tunku Abdul Rahman was worried about the impact of Singapore's leftist influence in a unified Malaysia. He demanded that Singapore's political opposition be arrested as a condition of merger. The PAP was hesitant about the arrests as they could damage the PAP's popularity in Singapore. However, the Brunei Revolt of 8 December 1962 gave the PAP a 'heaven sent opportunity' to justify the arrests. The BS's open support of the Brunei revolt gave the PAP an excuse that the arrests were to prevent possible communist subversion and safeguard the security and safety in Singapore.

On 2 February 1963, the ISC launched a crackdown against leftists and their supports. Under the action, code-named Operation Coldstore, 113 people including political, trade unionists and student leaders who had shown support for the Brunei Revolt were detained. Among those detainees, half of them were BS central leaders.

Operation Coldstore had substantially weakened the Barisan as most of its key personnel had been detained. According to Matthew Jones, "the Barisan never recovered from the combined effects of the outcome of the referendum result and the 'Coldstore' detentions." Jones also highlights that numerous Barisan leaders and members were bogged down with lawsuits and its followers were "demoralised". In addition, Tan Jing Quee mentions that "the two main pillars of the left-wing movement in Singapore, the Barisan Sosialis and SATU, (Note: Singapore Association of Trade Unions) were decapitated," following Operation Coldstore.

On 22 April 1963, Lee Siew Choh and remaining BS activists launched the "City Hall Battle". They marched from the BS's headquarter in Victoria Street to the steps of City Hall to protest the mass arrests in February and presented a petition to the Prime Minister in protest against the 'ill treatment' of the detainees. The protest was put down and seven party leaders including Lee Siew Choh were arrested.

=== 1963 general election ===
After Operation Coldstore and ensuing protests, major cadres of BS were detained or put on long trials. With Secretary-General Lim Chin Siong detained since February 1963, Lee Siew Choh served as both Chairman and de facto party leader during the election campaign. These events severely diminished the strength of BS, which prevented the party from effectively taking part in the 1963 general elections, and the party was eventually defeated in the elections. The 1963 elections ended with a clear victory of PAP winning thirty-seven of the fifty-one seats. BS won thirteen, and the remaining seat fell to Ong Eng Guan who contested under the banner of the United People's Party. Lim Huan Boon became the de facto Leader of the Opposition.

After the elections, the Malaysian Government took a series of actions to further debilitate BS. On Malaysia Day on 16 September 1963, the security authorities decided to launch two further crackdowns on the "left-wing" extremists. In those September and October operations, "some fifteen leaders of the Communist United Front" were rounded up. Some student activists from Nanyang University were soon arrested for alleged subversive activities. In late August 1963, seven trade unions under Singapore Association of Trade Unions (SATU) controlled by the BS, were served notices by the Government to show cause why they should not be deregistered. On 30 October, the seven unions which were supposed to close down were eventually struck off the register. In October, the government dissolved two of BS's most effective ancillary associations, The Singapore Rural Residents' Association and Singapore Country People's Association.

=== National Service ===
Soon after Malaysia was formed in 1963, alarmed by Indonesia's confrontation and rebel activities in the Borneo territories, the central parliament in Kuala Lumpur passed legislation which required all youth between the age of 18 and 25 to register for National Service. The left-wingers regarded this action as a government move "to counter the left-wing movement". However, within the left-wing camp, there were two different strategies to campaign against the National Service scheme supported by two schools led respectively by Chen Hock Wah, who was a member of the Malayan Communist Party and Lee Siew Choh, who was Chairman of BS.

Chen Hock Wah proposed a two-step policy called "Principled Registration" or "Registration under Protest". The first step was not to stop persons affected being registered. The second step was to tell the persons affected not to present themselves for rollcall if they were actually mobilised for active service after registration. On the other hand, the camp led by Lee advocated a boycott of the law and proposed affected persons should not even register in the first place. A great quarrel broke out in BS and Chen's strategy obtained majority support. Finally, Lee, together with seven other founding members resigned from the party attributing his resignation to the difference between him and other leaders. The party was split wide open, though Lee was persuaded to resume his chairmanship of BS on 9 March 1965.

=== Separation, expulsion and resignation ===
BS had fought against the merger with Malaysia, however, upon the declaration of Singapore's independence from Malaysia in 1965, leaders of BS declined to recognise the independence of Singapore. Lee Siew Choh, chairman of BS attacked the independence obtained by Singapore, stating that it was not genuine and released public slogans of "Crush Malaysia", "Phony Independence", and "Boycott Parliament". Reaction towards Singapore's independence within the left-wing camp was again divided. Lim Huan Boon, who was a member of the Communist Party of Malaya and one of BS's representatives in the Legislative Assembly recognised the independence of Singapore stating that there was no such thing as phony or half independence. Lim Chin Siong, another leader of BS who was in detention, also considered Singapore's independence to be genuine.

Taking the view that there was neither true national independence nor parliamentary democracy, BS began to boycott Parliament and elections. On 31 December 1965, Lim Huan Boon resigned his Bukit Merah Constituency seat as he did not support BS boycotting parliament. On 15 January 1966, BS expelled two more of its leaders, Kow Kee Seng and Chio Cheng Thun.

In October 1966, BS had all its remaining representatives in Parliament resign their seats and started what they called an extra-parliamentary struggle. An editorial in The Straits Times commented that BS chose the wrong time to launch an extra-parliamentary struggle:

"To give up the constitutional arena, at a time when none other exists, is very much like giving up politics altogether".

=== Boycott and contest of general elections ===
By 1967, BS had been depleted and its declining fortunes was seen in the contraction of its membership. Within three years from 1963 to 1966, the number of its branches had shrunk to 33 from 36 with only 22 effective. In contrast, the PAP maintained its 51 branches throughout the three years. BS boycotted the 1968 general election and allowed the PAP to win all 51 seats in the Parliament.

BS returned to contest the 1972 general election and failed to win any seat with a clean sweep by the PAP. BS would fail to win any seats also in subsequent elections till 1984.

=== Merger into Workers' Party and dissolution ===
In May 1988, BS was de facto dissolved and merged into the Workers' Party (WP) to strengthen the opposition and applied for dissolution. The application was rejected as BS's constitution required all its branches to agree to the dissolution but none were left. Hence, it has been left dormant since.

In August 2025, around four decades after its shutdown, the Ministry of Home Affairs (MHA) sought proof of BS' continued existence, along with that of 13 other political parties, as they had failed to comply with the Foreign Interference (Countermeasures) Act 2021 (FICA). The Registrar of Societies (ROS) was ordered to officially deregister the parties if no proof was provided within three months. The party was officially deregistered on 4 December 2025.

== Communist allegations ==
From the perspective of the PAP government, BS was a "communist-controlled organisation" closely affiliated with the Malayan Communist Party (MCP) which Lee Kuan Yew labelled as a "main open front communist organization" The Internal Security Council (ISC) stated that BS activists were indeed "communist-inspired" and BS was controlled by the communists to sabotage the formation of Malaysia.

Although admitting that they adopted communist tactics for the anti-colonial cause because, at the time, such tactics would gather mass support, Lim Chin Siong refuted the communist label attached to him and BS. During an interview, Lim said:

Let me make it clear, once and for all, that I am not a communist, or a communist front-man, or, for that matter, anybody's front-man. I was an MBA League member, but that doesn't mean that I was a communist...MBA is far from MCP...Study the Manifesto of the PA; it was more anti-colonial and more communist in doctrine...Of course during that time, the largest surviving party in Malaya was MCP and PAP was relatively new, so it was inevitable the thinking was influenced by communism.

It was discussed that BS was merely inspired by successful communist movements elsewhere to end colonialism and to mobilise the masses, and there is uncertainty about whether BS was actually communist controlled or not.

== Election results ==
=== Legislative Assembly ===
Election	Leader	Votes	%	Seats					Position	Result
Election	Leader	Votes	%	Contested			Total	+/–	Position	Result
Election	Leader	Votes	%	Seats	Won	Lost	Total	+/–	Position	Result
1963	Lee Siew Choh (de facto and de jure leader); Lim Chin Siong (Secretary-General, detained)	193,301	33.24%	46	13	33	13 / 51	▲13	▲2nd	Opposition

=== Parliament ===
Election	Leader	Votes	%	Seats					Position	Result
Election	Leader	Votes	%	Contested			Total	+/–	Position	Result
Election	Leader	Votes	%	Seats	Won	Lost	Total	+/–	Position	Result
1968	Lee Siew Choh	Boycotted					0 / 58	▼13	—N/a	No seats
1972	Lee Siew Choh	34,483	4.63%	10	0	10	0 / 65	Steady	▲4th	No seats
1976	Lee Siew Choh	25,411	3.19%	6	0	6	0 / 69	Steady	▲3rd	No seats
1980	Lee Siew Choh	16,488	2.59%	4	0	4	0 / 75	Steady	▼5th	No seats
1984	Lee Siew Choh	24,212	2.76%	4	0	4	0 / 79	Steady	▼6th	No seats

==== Seats contested ====
Election	Constituencies contested	Contested vote %	Swing
1963	Aljunied, Anson, Bras Basah, Bukit Merah, Bukit Panjang, Bukit Timah, Cairnhill, Changi, Chua Chu Kang, Crawford, Delta, Farrer Park, Geylang East, Geylang West, Havelock, Hong Lim, Jalan Besar, Jalan Kayu, Joo Chiat, Jurong, Kallang, Kampong Glam, Kampong Kapor, Kretar Ayer, Moulmein, Mountbatten, Nee Soon, Pasir Panjang, Paya Lebar, Punggol, Queenstown, River Valley, Rochore, Sembawang, Sepoy Lines, Serangoon Gardens, Stamford, Tampines, Tanglin, Tanjong Pagar, Telok Ayer, Telok Blangah, Thomson, Tiong Bahru, Toa Payoh, Upper Serangoon	37.1%	—N/a
1972	Bukit Ho Swee, Bukit Merah, Bukit Timah, Chua Chu Kang, Delta, Havelock, Kampong Chai Chee, Kuo Chuan, Rochore, Toa Payoh	26.6%	▼ -10.5%
1976	Boon Teck, Khe Bong, Kim Keat, Kuo Chuan, Rochore, Toa Payoh	27.1%	▲0.5%
1980	Boon Teck, Khe Bong, Kuo Chuan, Toa Payoh	27.0%	▼0.1%
1984	Boon Teck, Khe Bong, Kuo Chuan, Toa Payoh	38.2%	▲11.2%

=== By-elections ===
==== Legislative Assembly ====
Election	Leader	Constituency contested	Votes	%	Seats				Result
Election	Leader	Constituency contested	Votes	%	Contested		Total	+/–	Result
Election	Leader	Constituency contested	Votes	%	Won	Lost	Total	+/–	Result
1965	Chia Thye Poh	Hong Lim	4,346	40.5%	0	1	0 / 1	Steady	Lost

==== Parliament ====
Election	Leader	Constituency contested	Votes	%	Seats				Result
Election	Leader	Constituency contested	Votes	%	Contested		Total	+/–	Result
Election	Leader	Constituency contested	Votes	%	Won	Lost	Total	+/–	Result
1977	Lee Siew Choh	Radin Mas	4,473	27.8%	0	1	0 / 1	Steady	Lost
