= Facilities of the National University of Singapore =

The main campus of the National University of Singapore (NUS) is located in the southwestern part of Singapore, adjacent to the Kent Ridge subzone of Queenstown, accommodating an area of 170 ha (420 acres). The Duke–NUS Medical School, a postgraduate medical school jointly established with Duke University, is located at the Outram campus, and its Bukit Timah campus houses the Faculty of Law and Lee Kuan Yew School of Public Policy.

Buildings of NUS

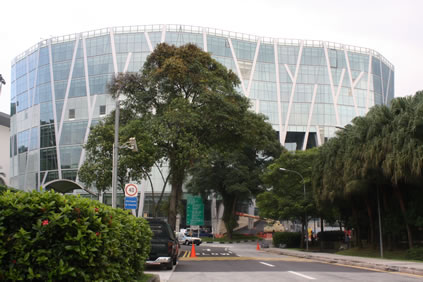
Mochtar Riady Building, Business School

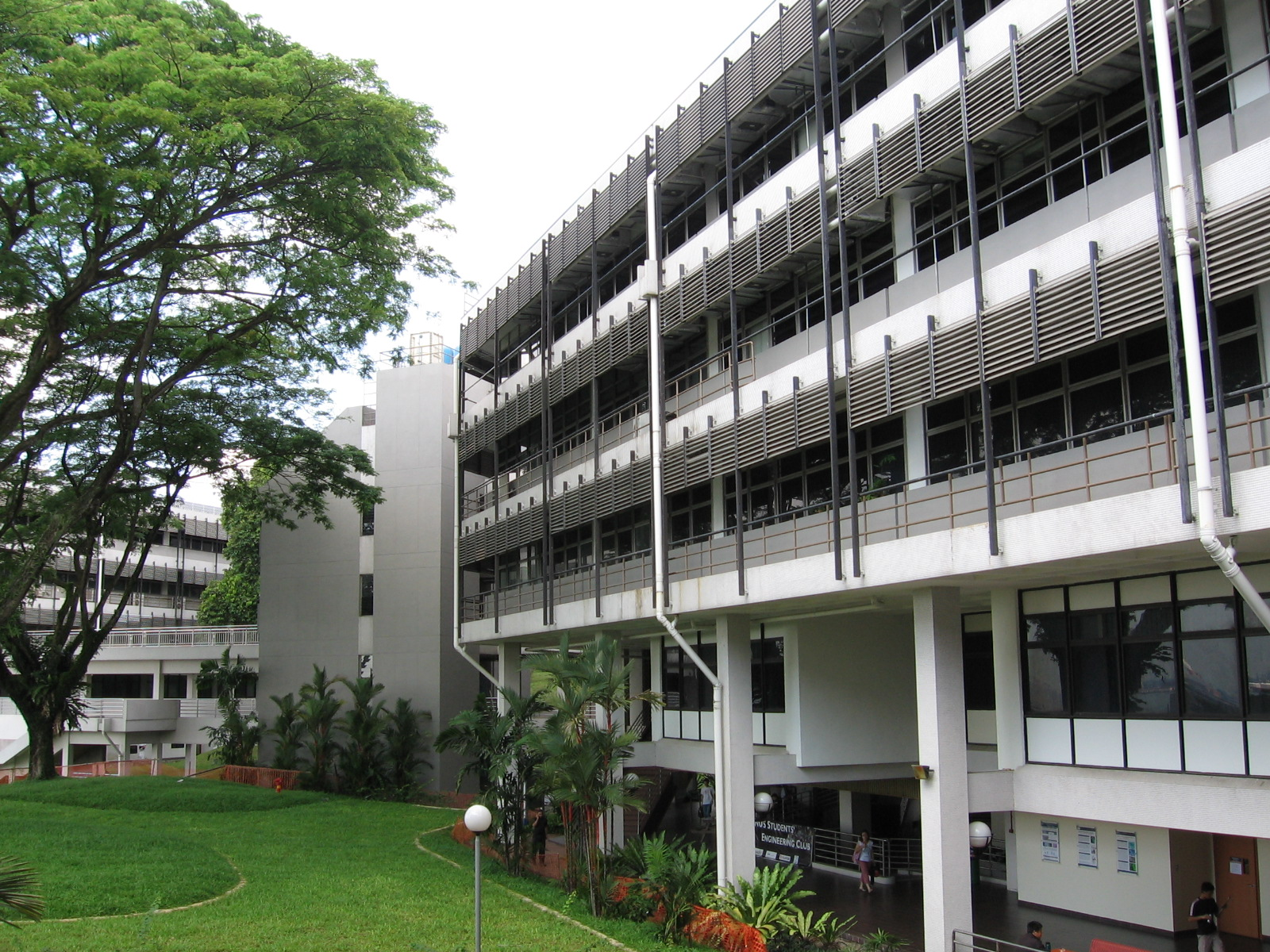
Engineering 2

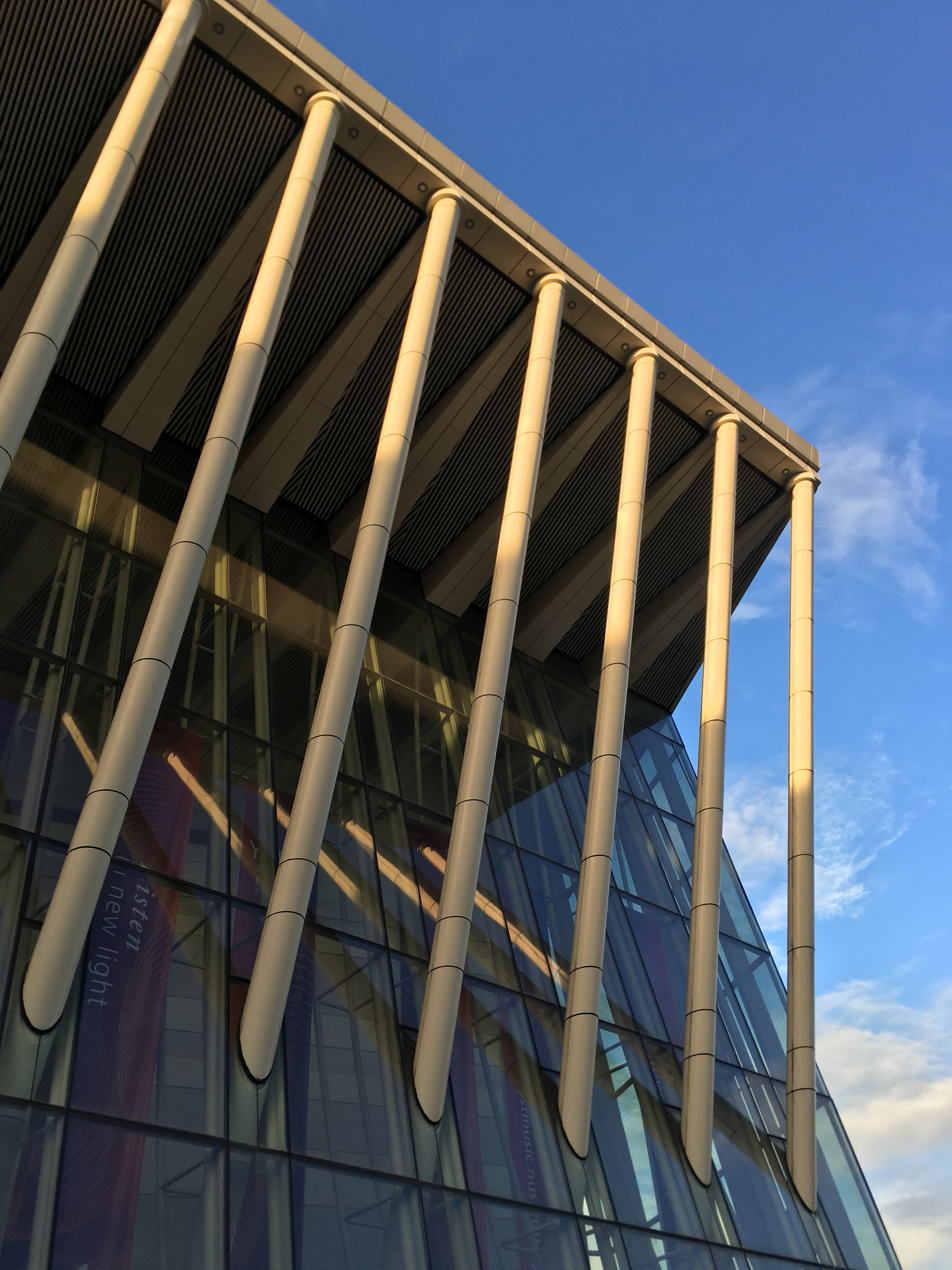
Yong Siew Toh Music Conservatory

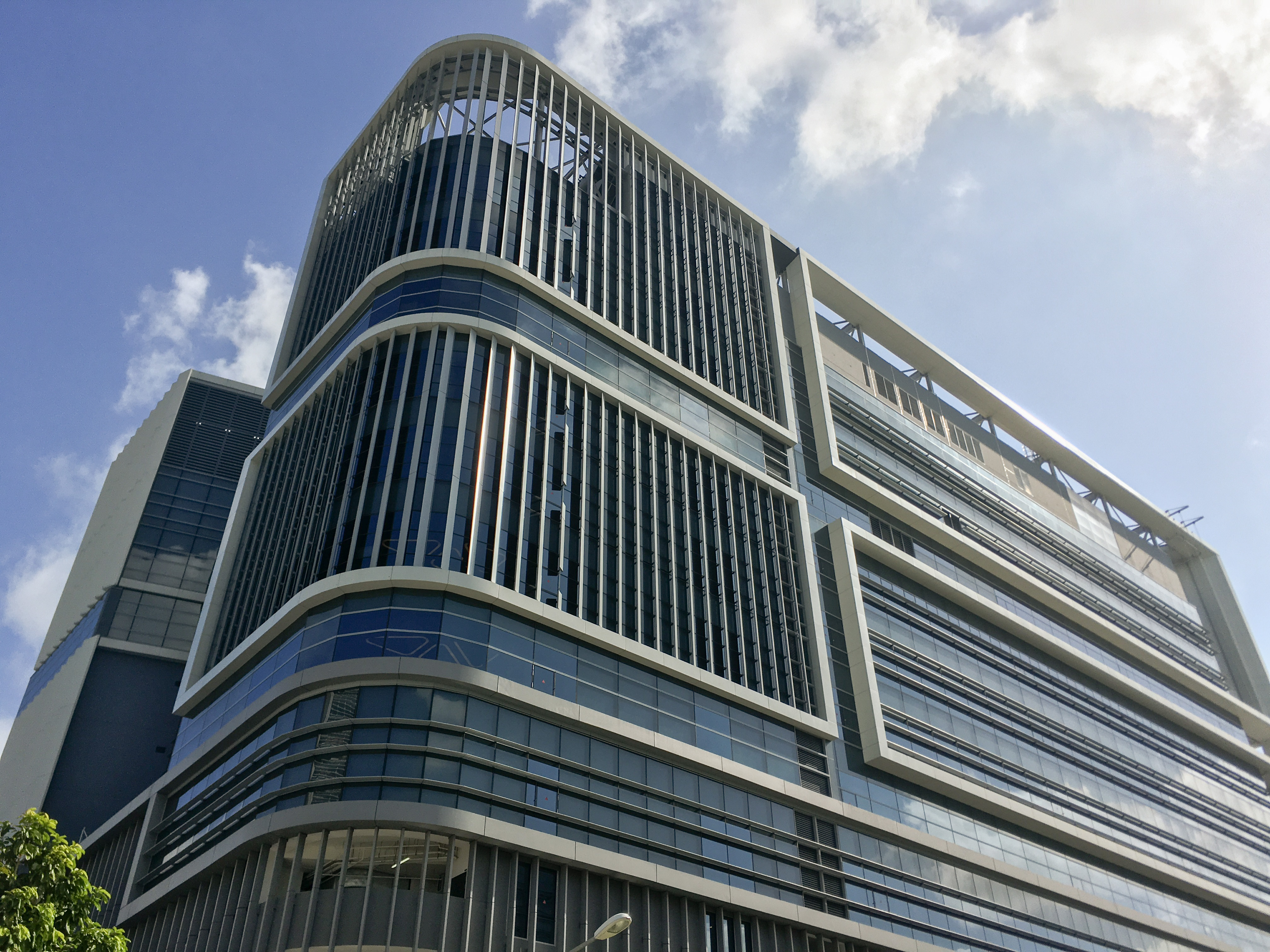
Dentistry

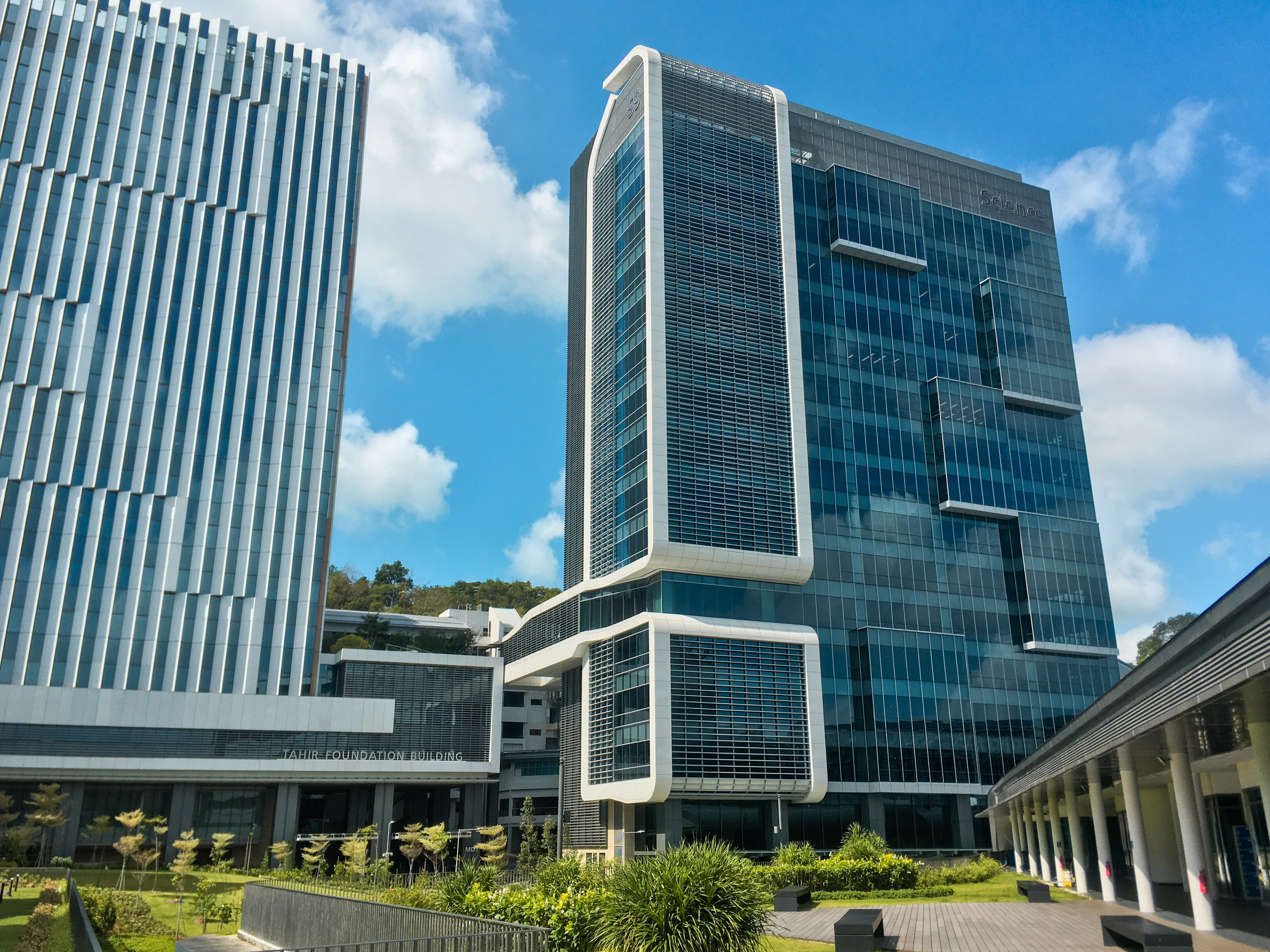
Faculty of Science

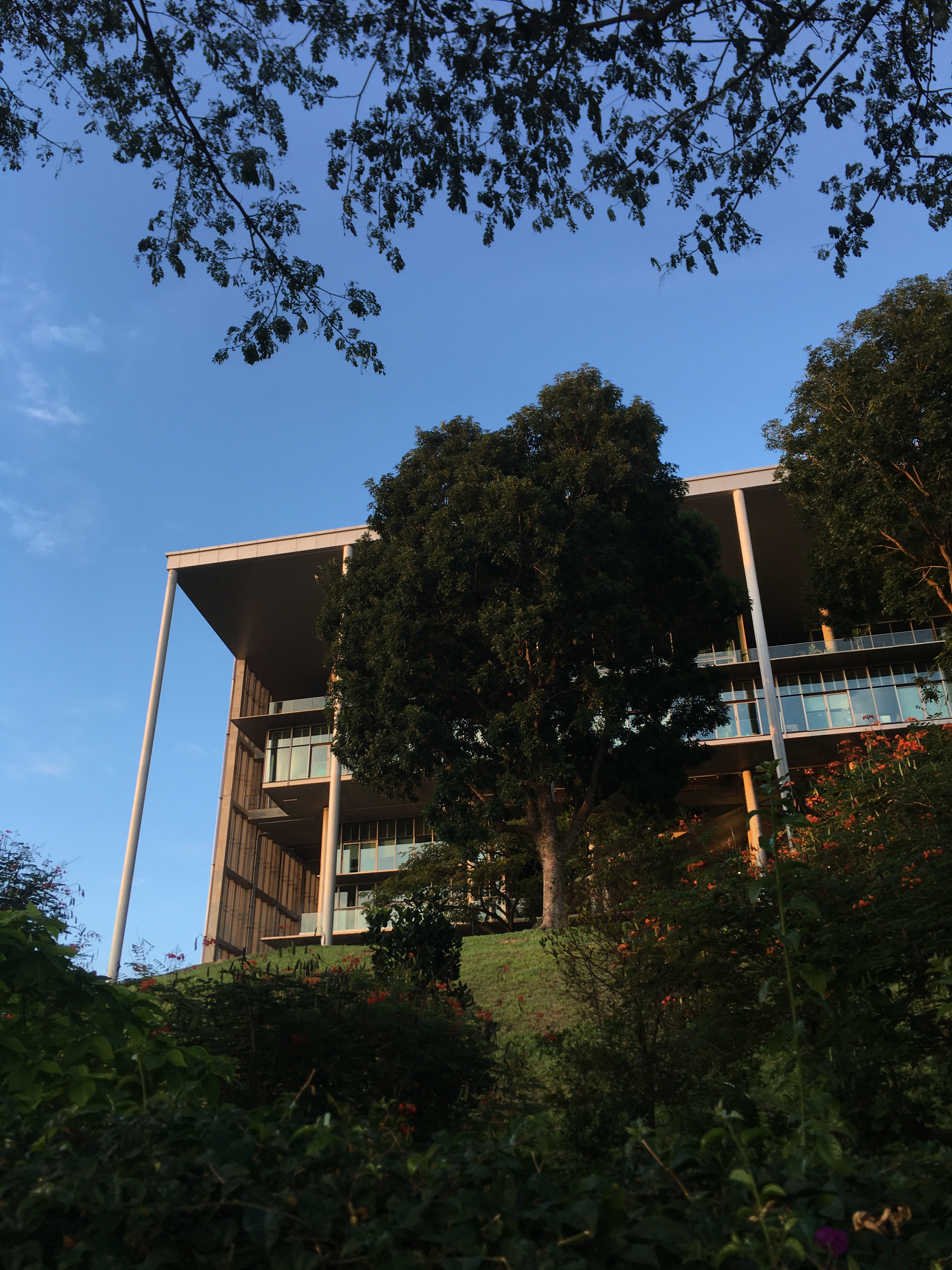
SDE4

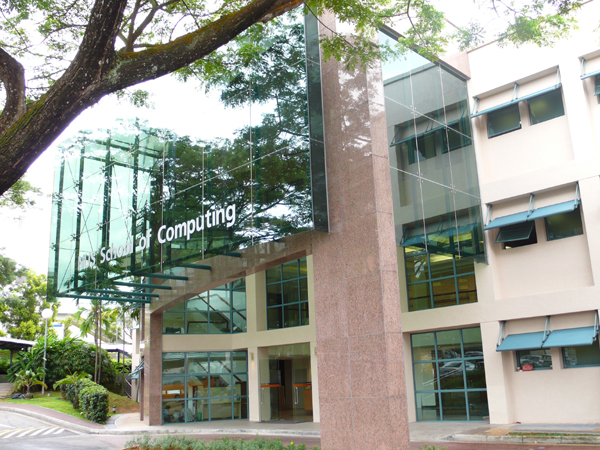
School of Computing

University Hall

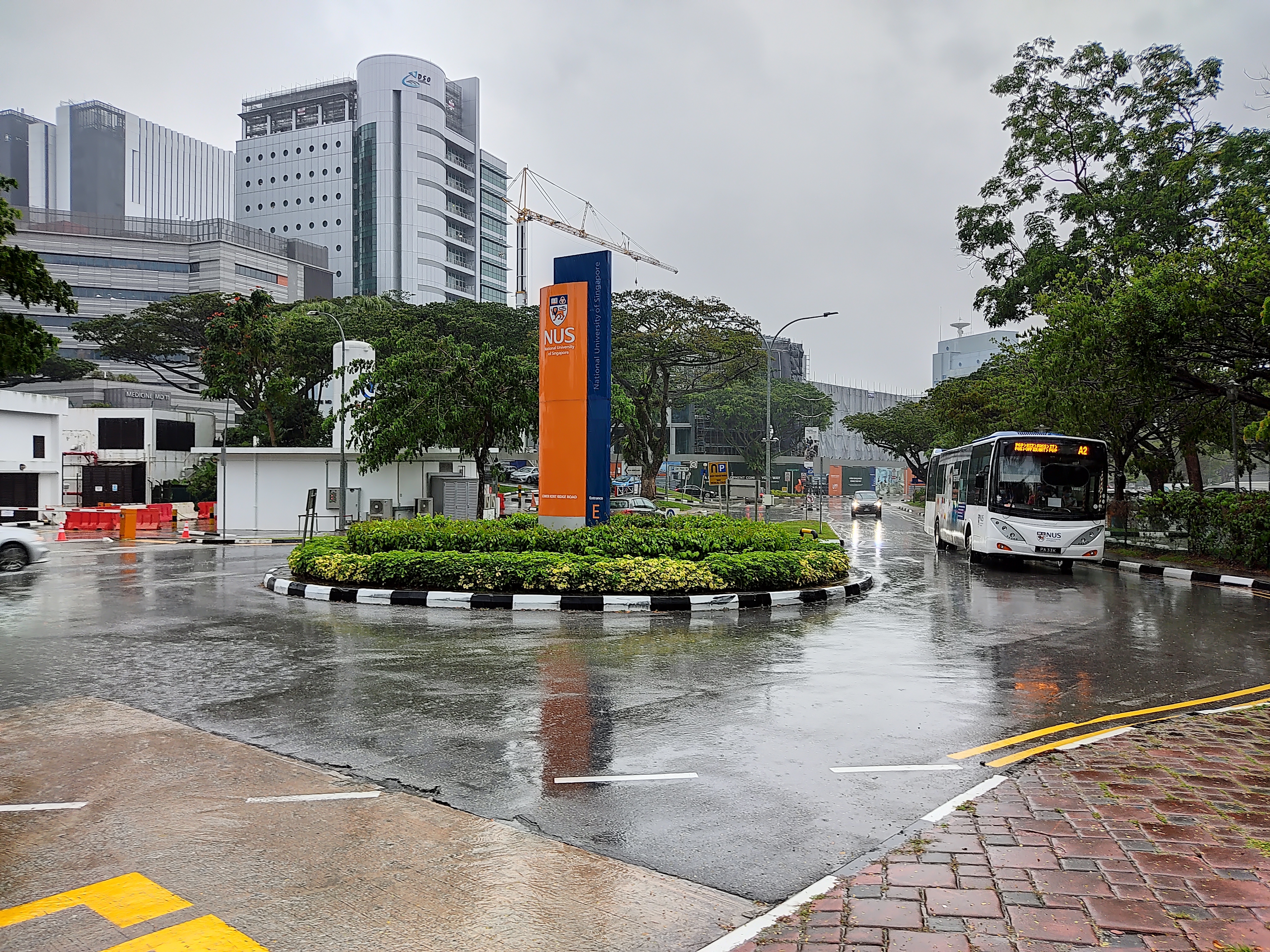
Entrance E

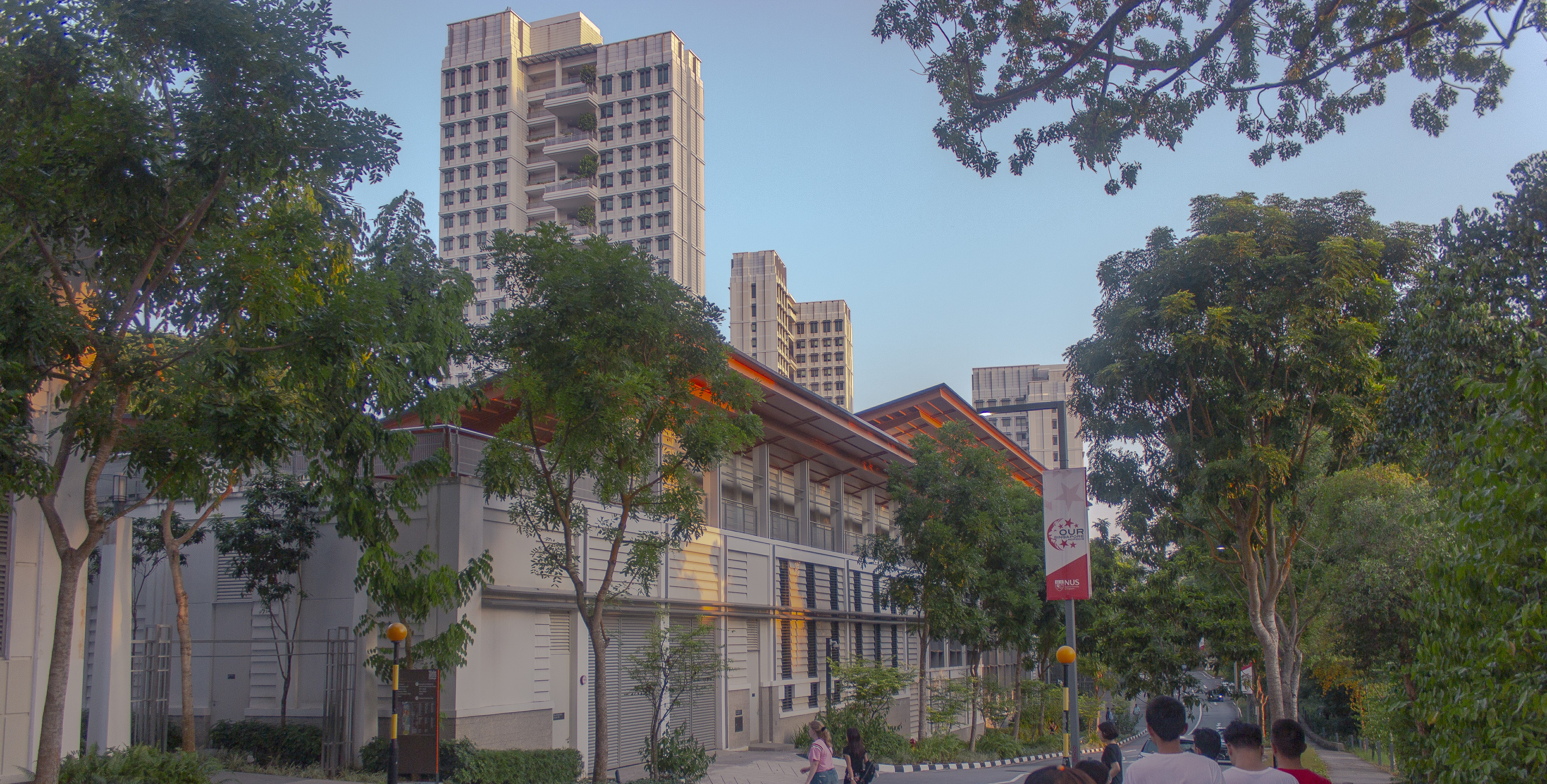
Yale-NUS College

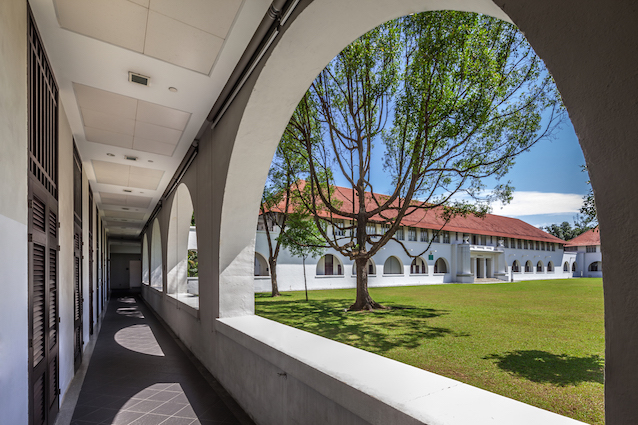
Bukit Timah campus which houses the Law and Public Policy schools

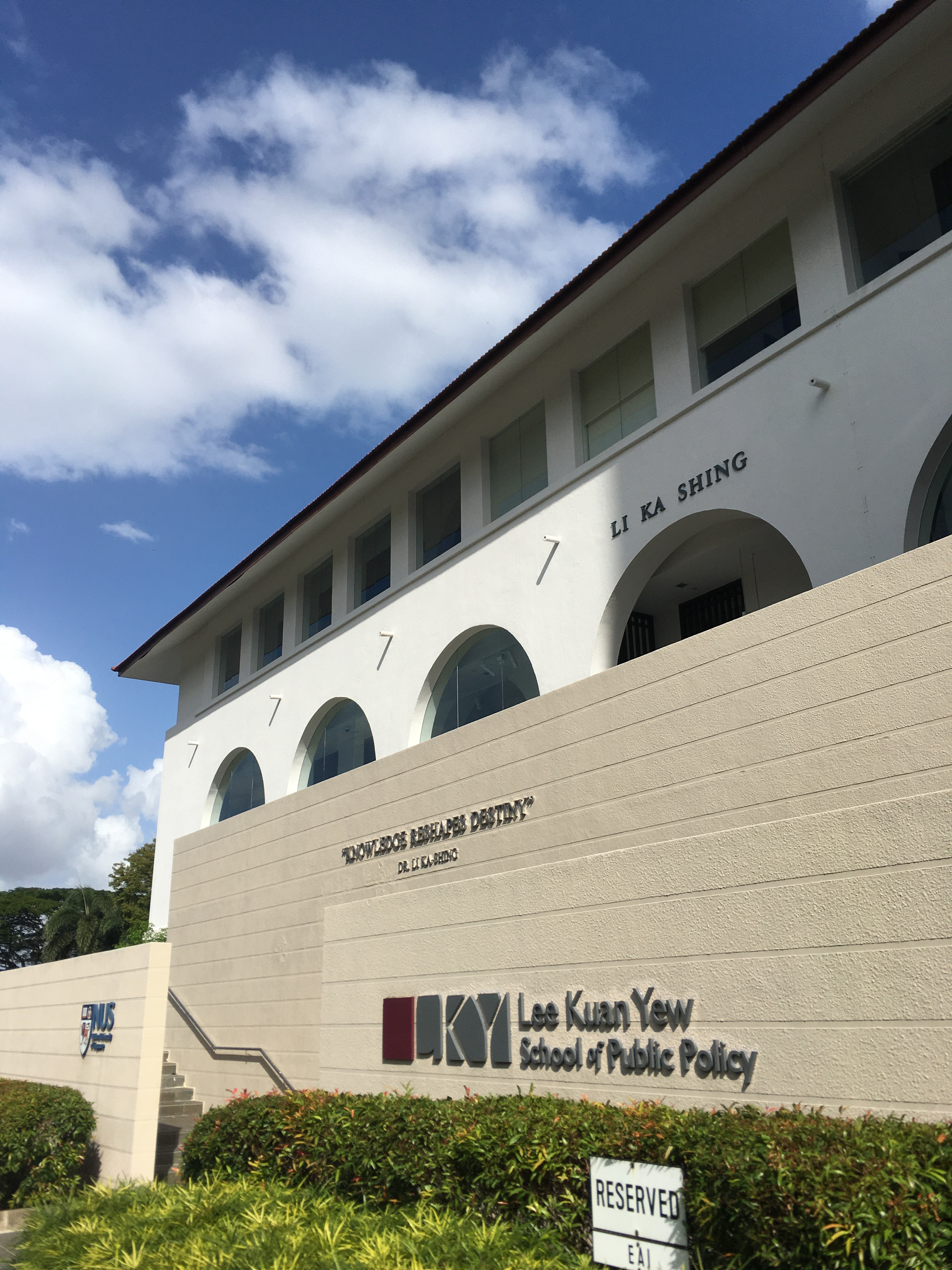
LKYSPP, Bukit Timah Campus

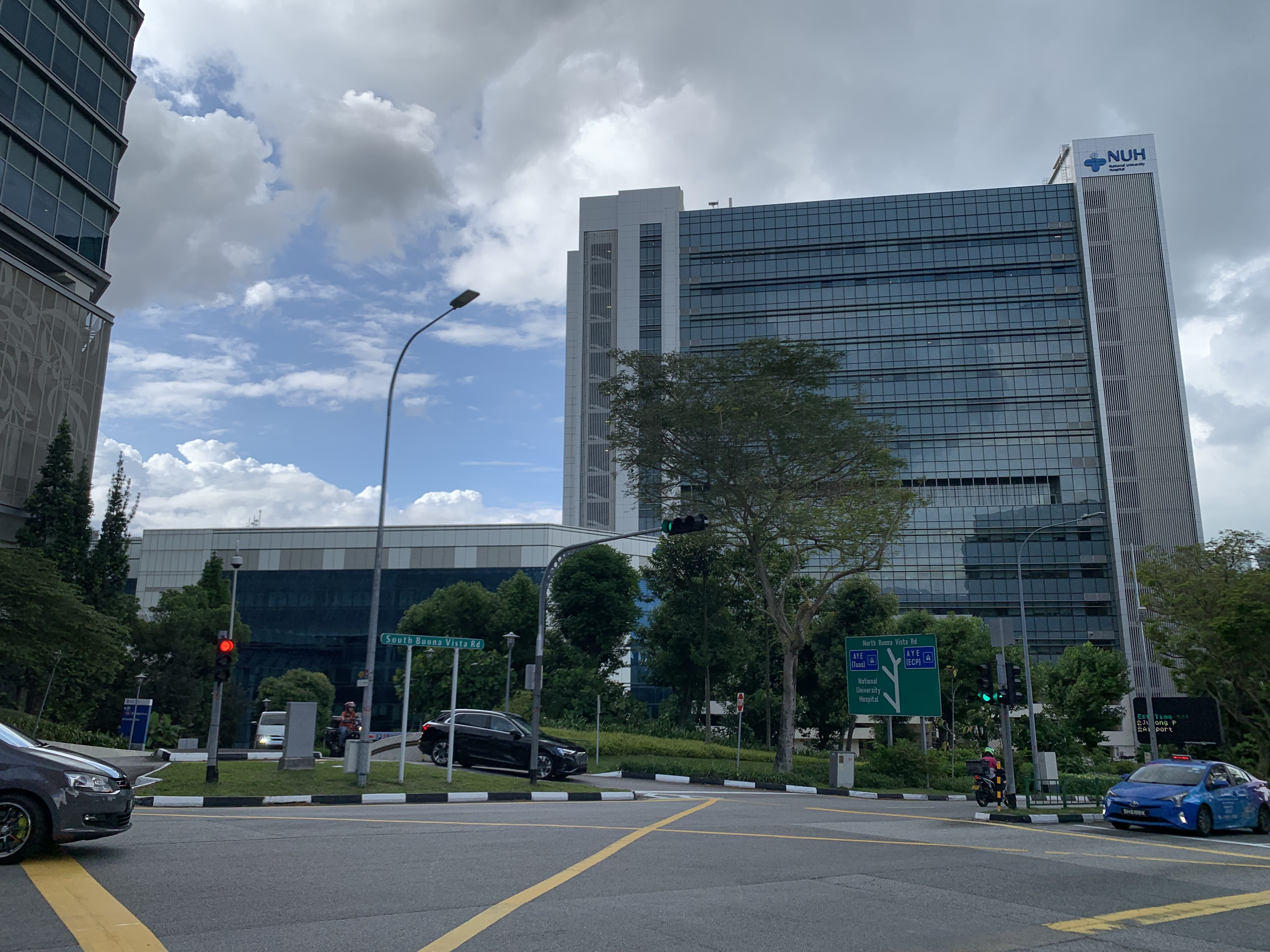
National University Hospital

== IT and computing services ==
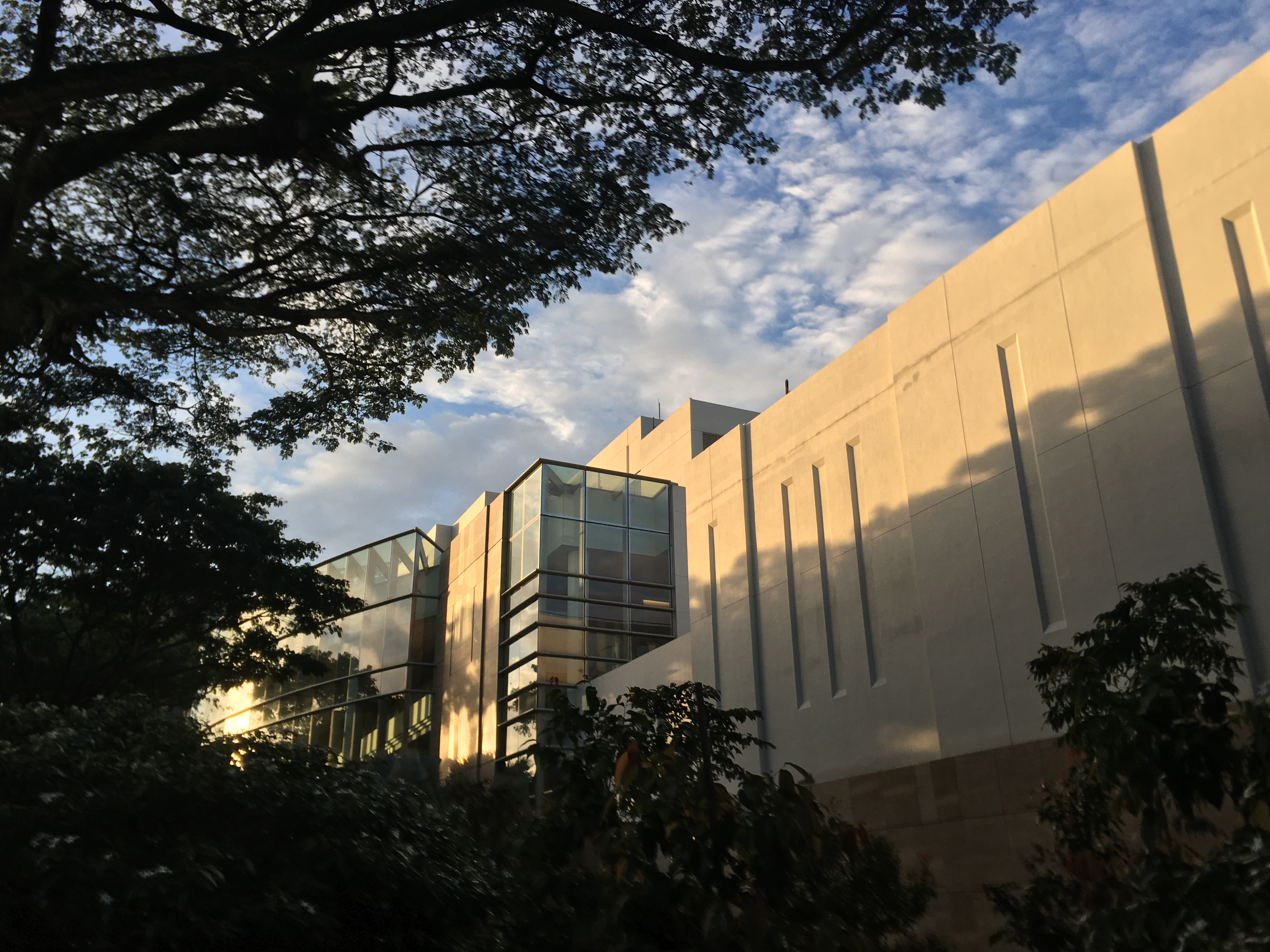
University Cultural Centre

NUS hosts NUSNET, an intranet, which is used in research, teaching, learning and administration. In 2004, a campus-wide grid computing network was deployed, connecting at least 1,000 computers. At the time, it was one of the largest of such virtual supercomputing facilities in the region.

== Libraries ==
The NUS Libraries currently comprises seven libraries: the Central Library, Wan Boo Sow Chinese Library (Chinese: 雲茂潮中文图书馆), C J Koh Law Library, Hon Sui Sen Memorial Library, the Medicine+Science Library, Music Library and Yale-NUS College Library. As of June 2017, there were 2,354,741 unique titles, and 26,074 microform resources in the collection. This has since expanded to 3,018,572 unique physical titles, 94,446 electronic periodicals, 1,244,448 electronic books and 936 databases, as of 2022.

NUS Libraries

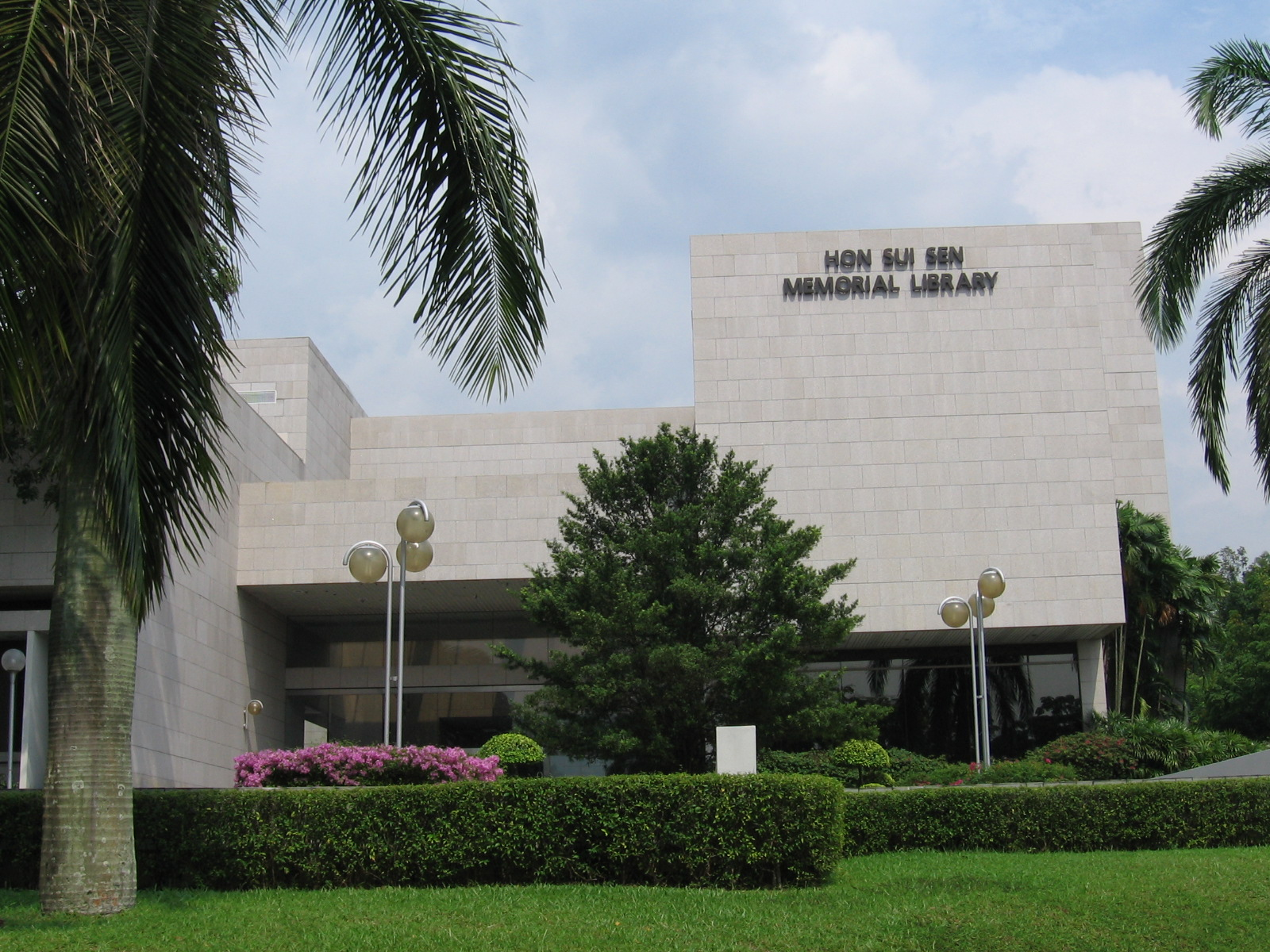
Hon Sui Sen Memorial Library, 2006

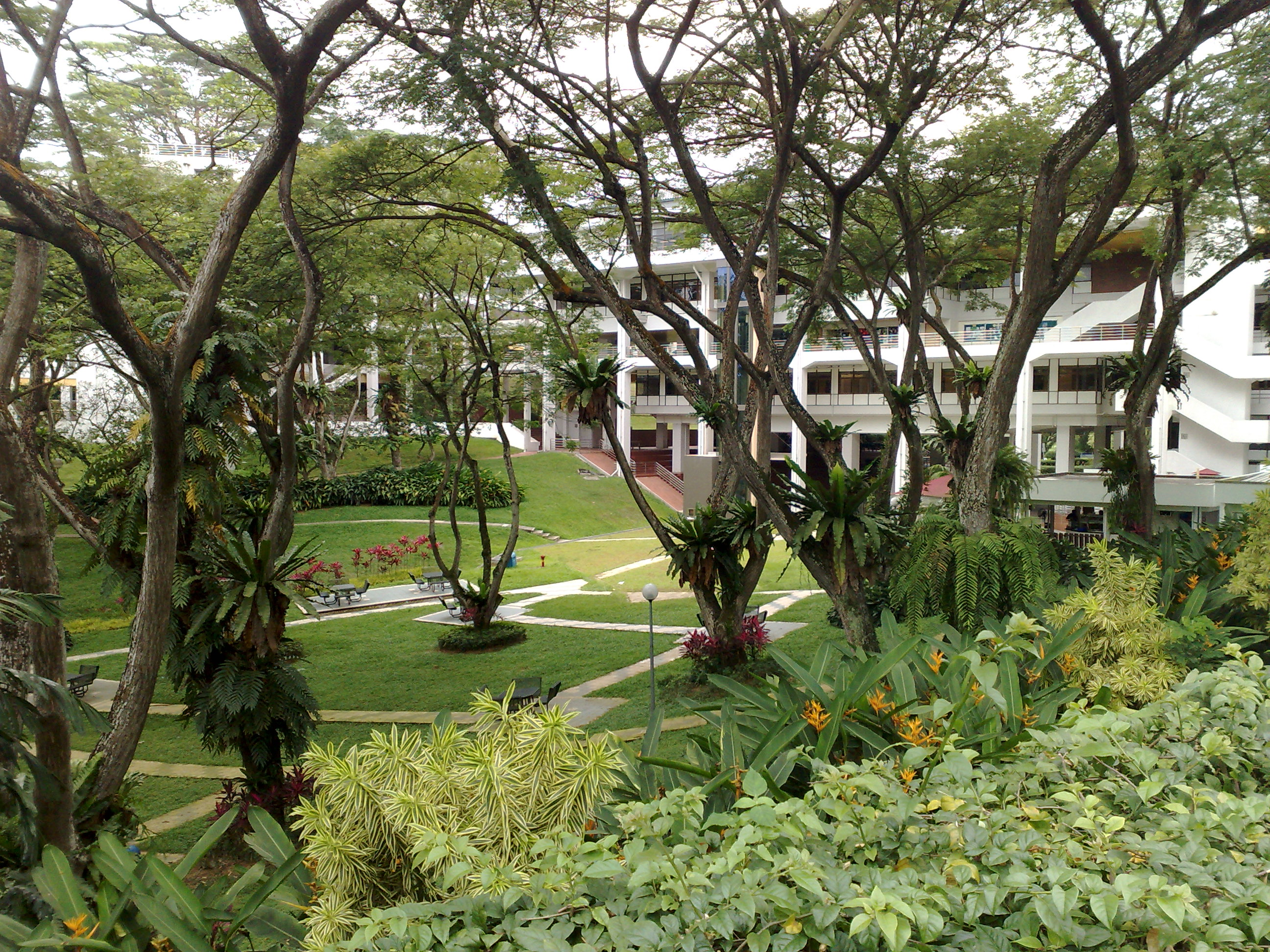
Open space outside Central Library, 2008

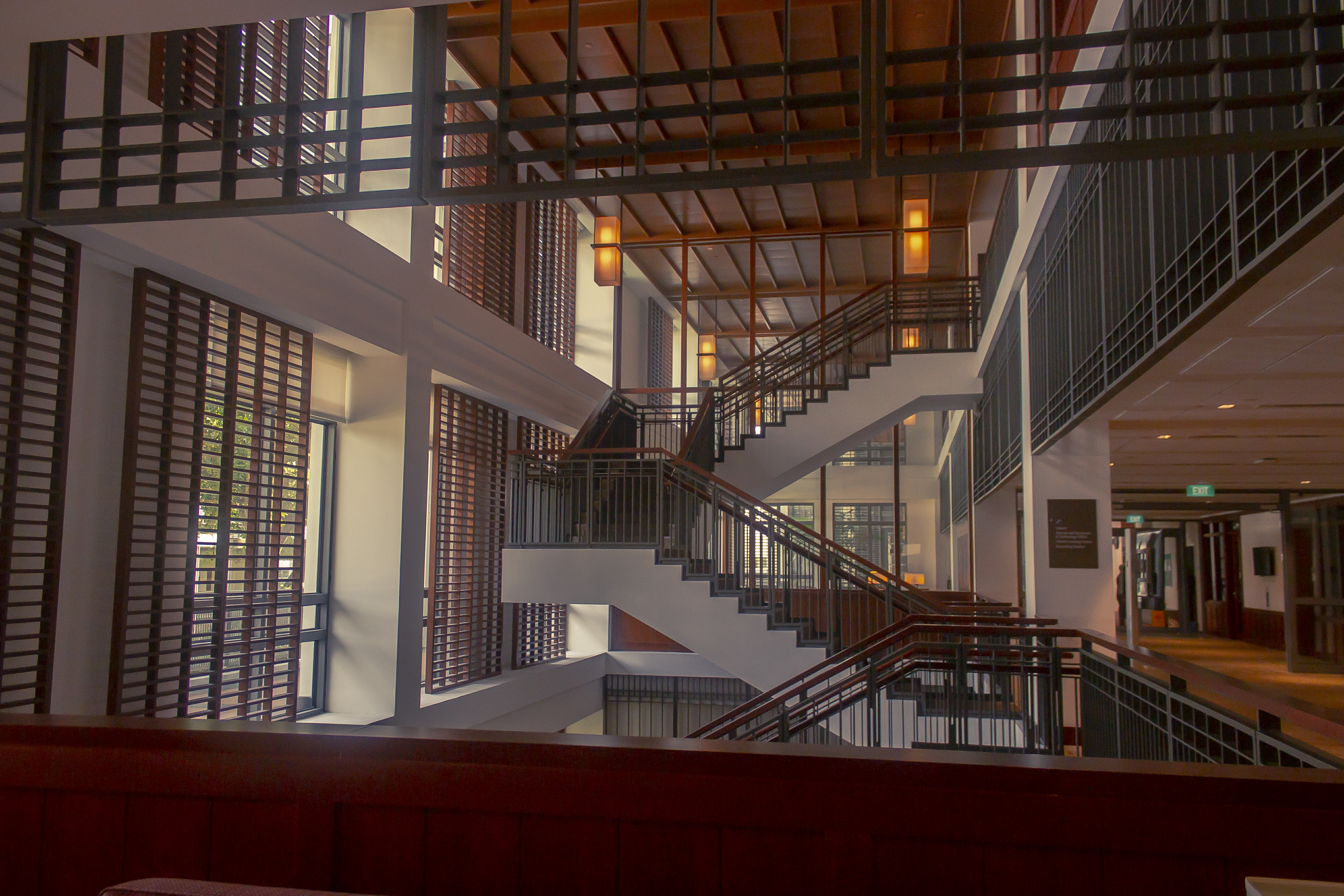
Yale-NUS College Library, 2019

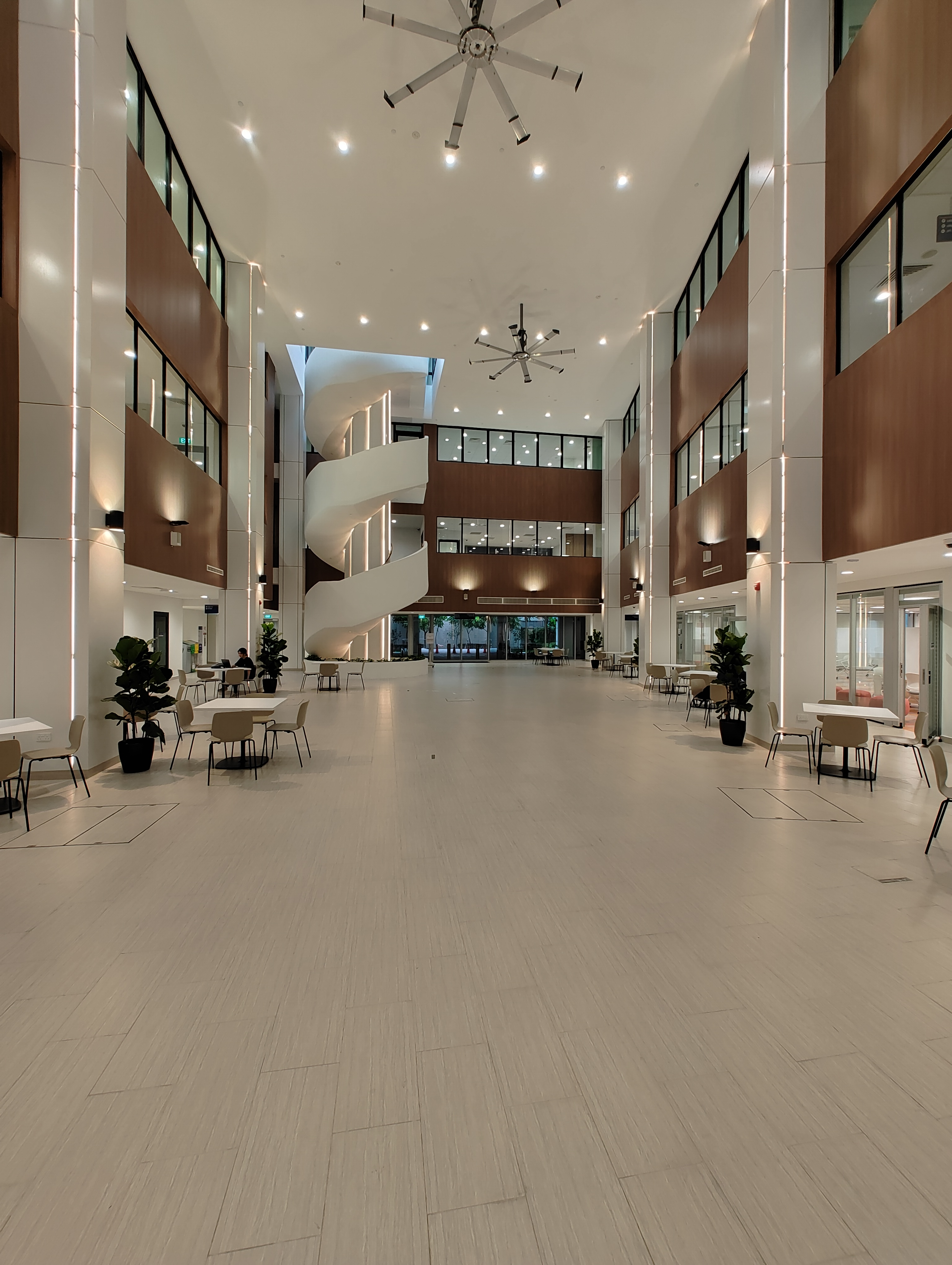
Medicine+Science Library, 2023

== Digital newspaper archive database ==
The NUS Libraries established a digital newspaper archive database, GEMS, which contains various digitized collections, including Chinese-language newspapers published in Southeast Asian countries in the 19th and 20th centuries. Currently, 152 types are included, including Chinese newspapers from Singapore and Malaysia and historical documents on China and overseas Chinese in Southeast Asia. Most of these documents are publicly accessible resources and are free to readers.

GEMS also contains periodicals and books from the 20th century and is free to readers also.

== University Town ==
The NUS University Town (UTown) opened in August 2011. Located at the Kent Ridge campus, it was built on the site of a former golf course. UTown hosts four residential colleges, a graduate residence, the shared NUS College and NUS Law campus (formerly the Yale-NUS campus), research institutes (such as the TUM CREATE), lecture theatres, restaurants, convenience stores, and a barber shop.

University Town, NUS

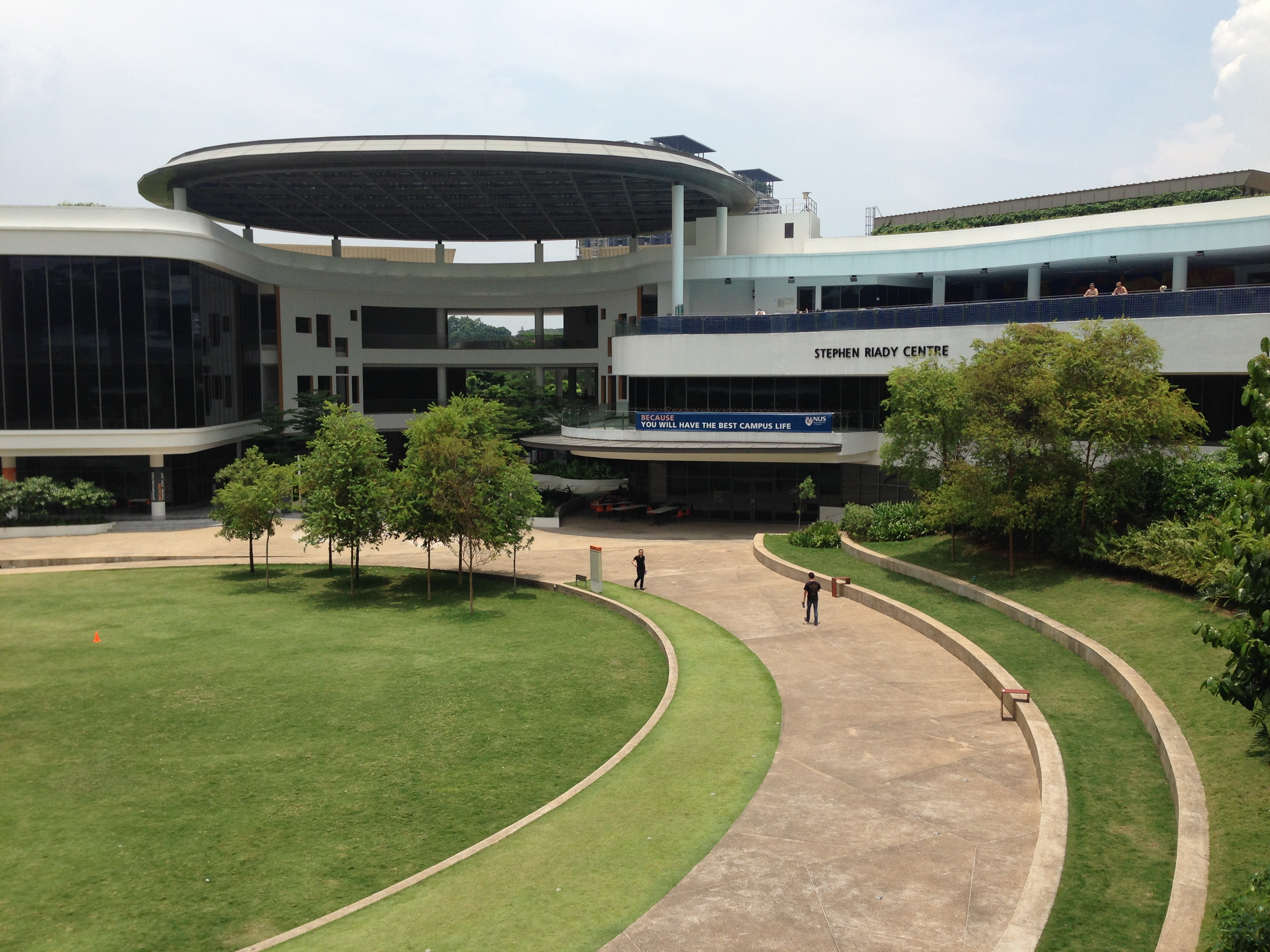

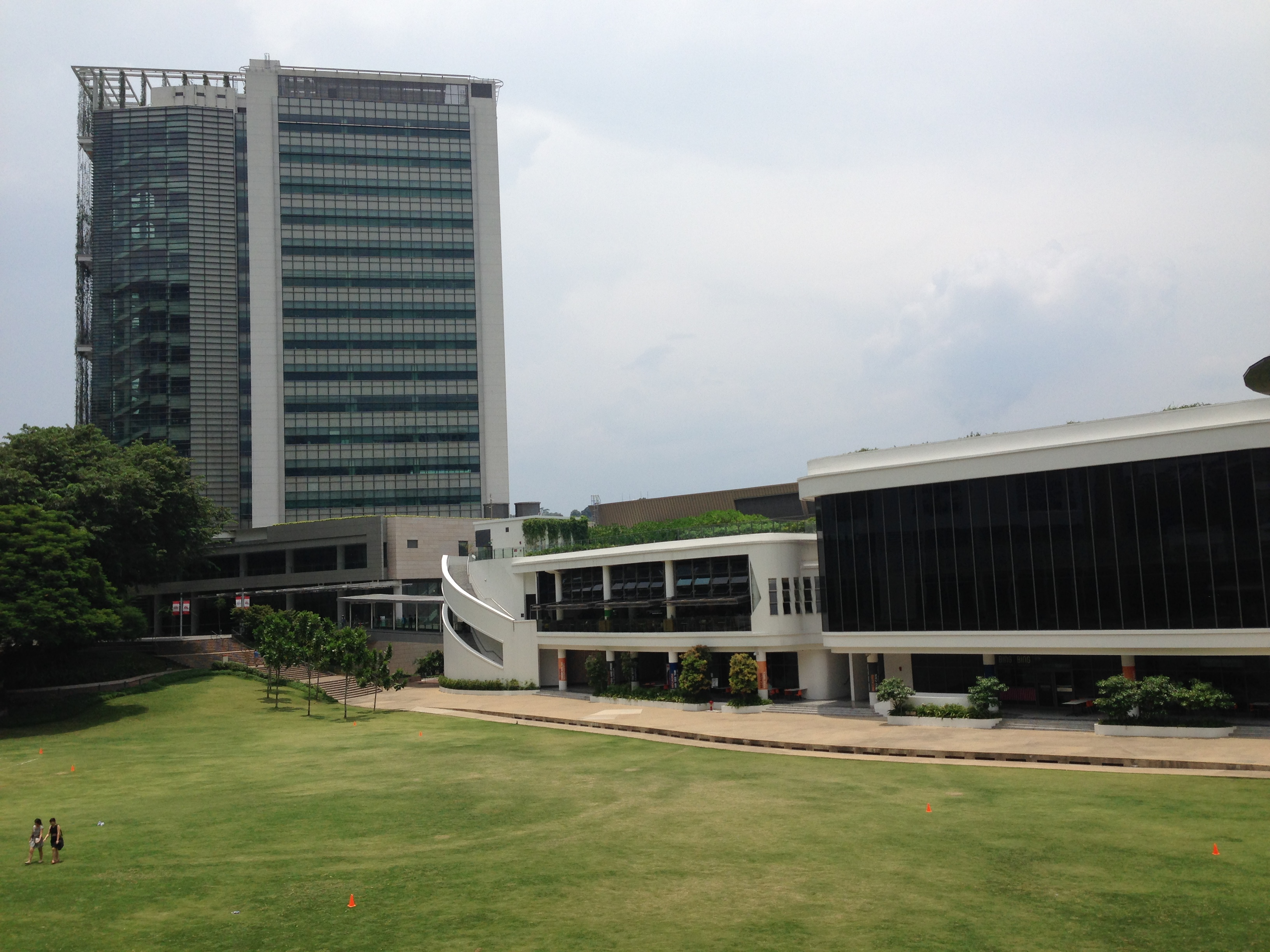

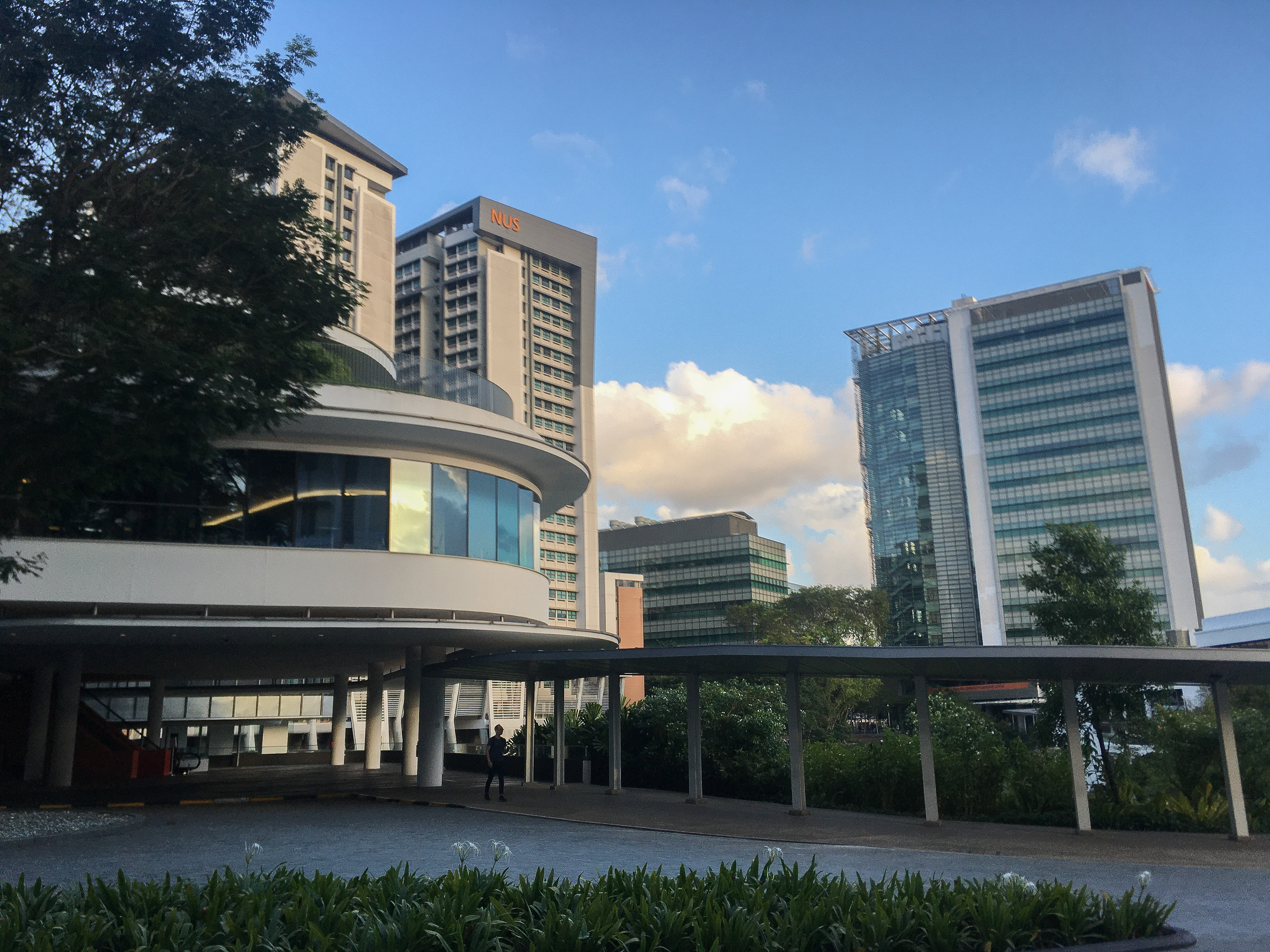

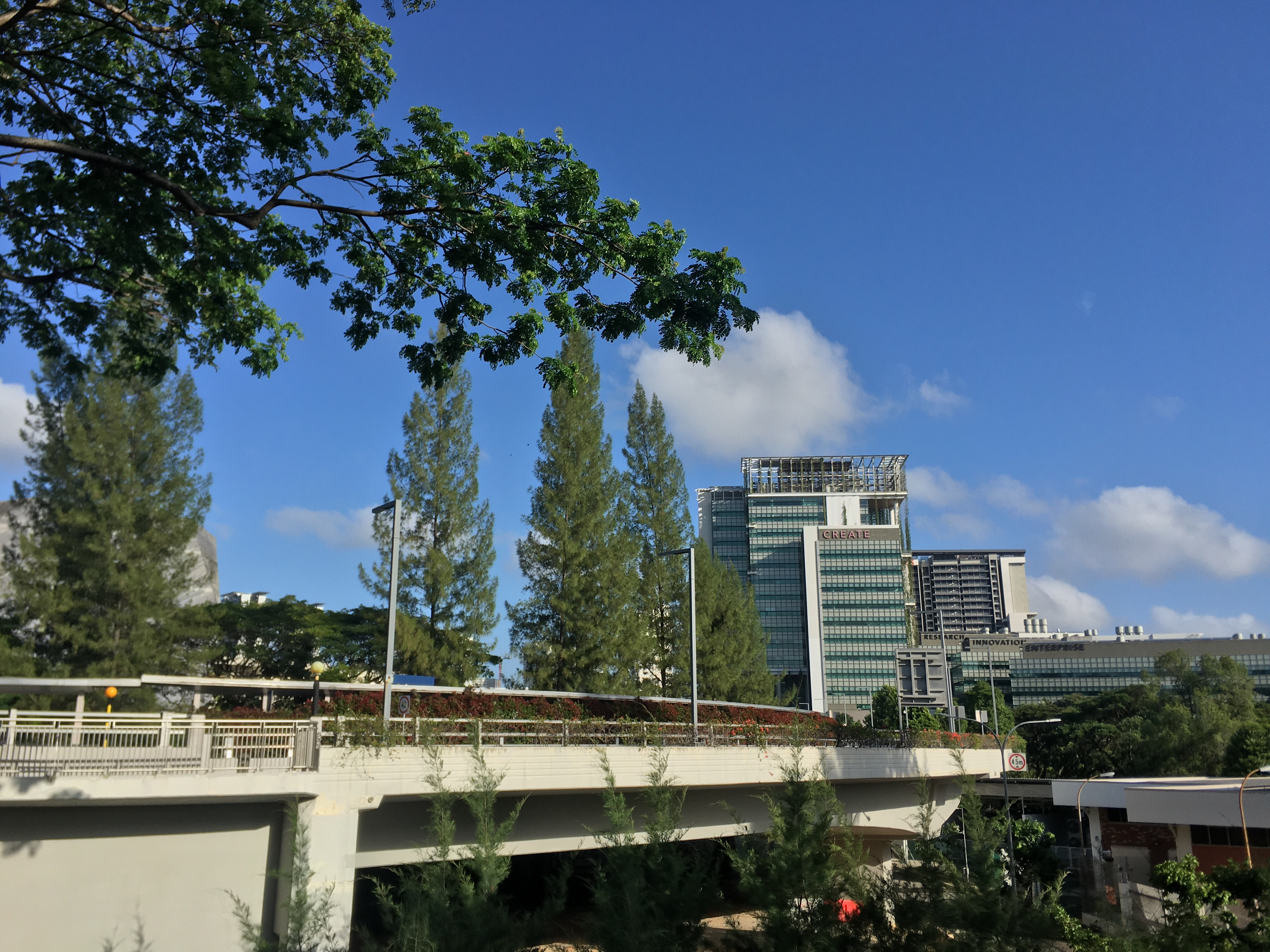

== Transportation ==
The university has a free internal shuttle bus system that operates across the Bukit Timah and Kent Ridge campuses. In late 2022, the university started to deploy electric buses in partnership with ComfortDelGro. (CDG). The services are known for being extremely busy at peak times. The NUS NextBus app was introduced in 2012.

NUS Internal Shuttle Bus

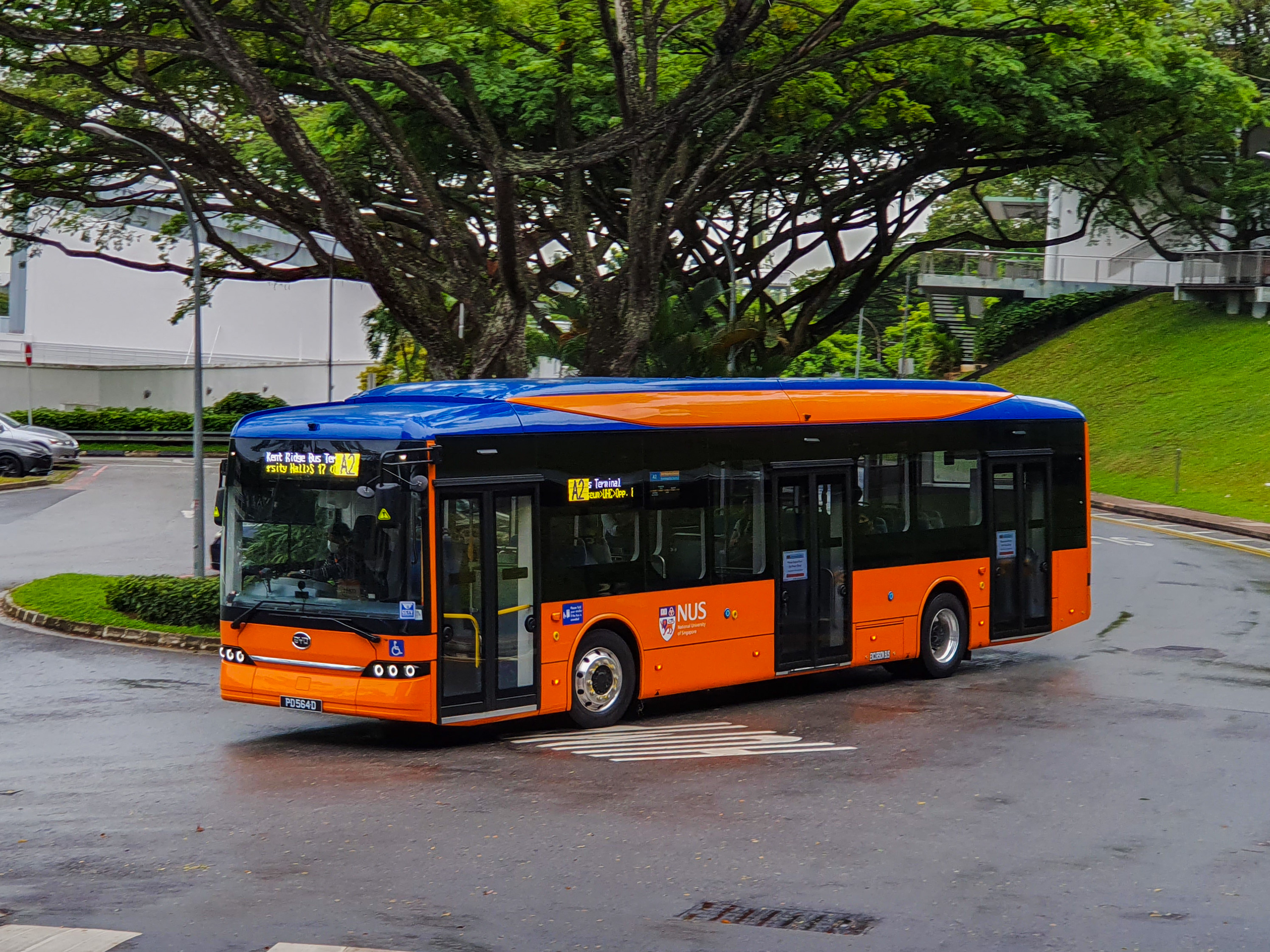

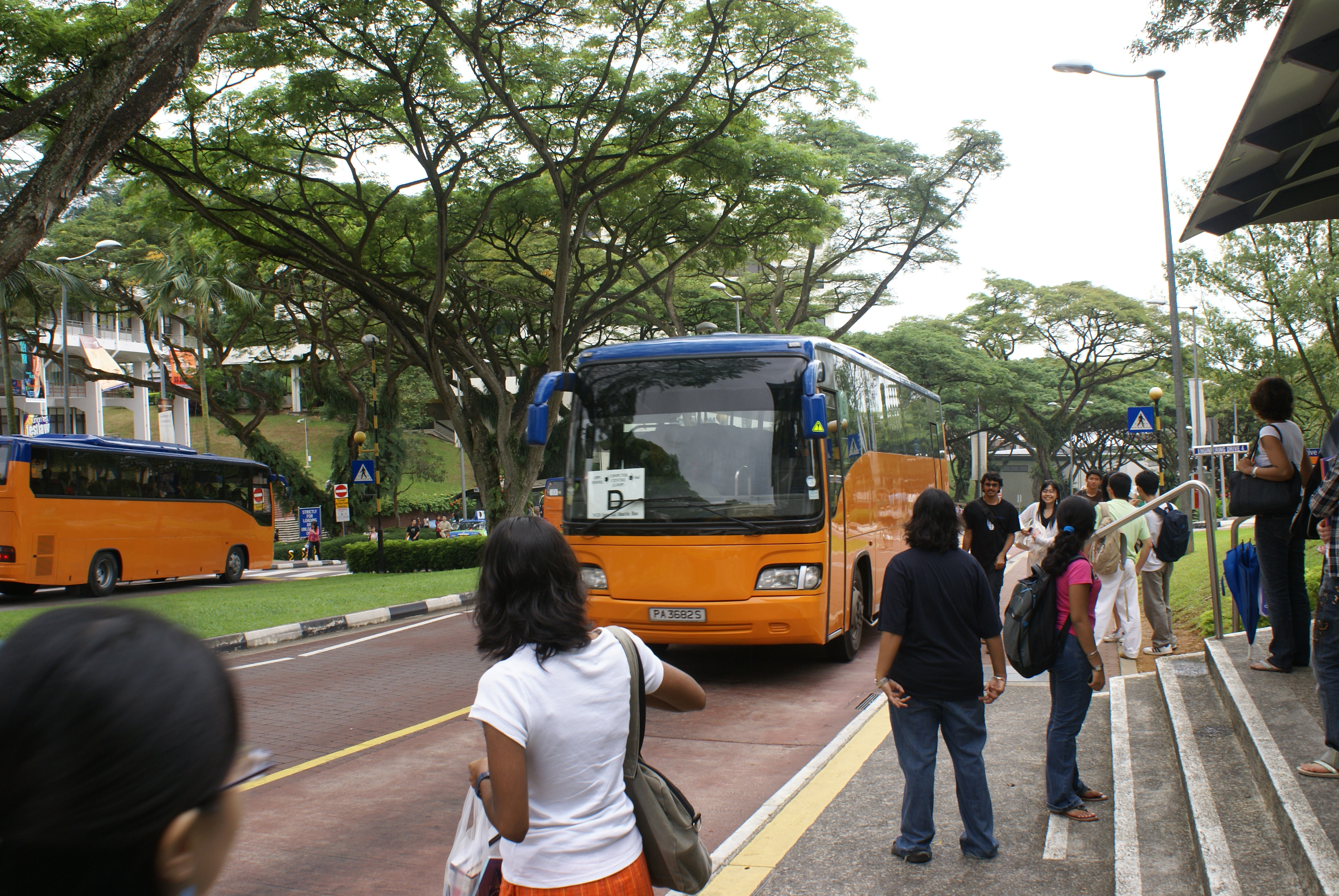

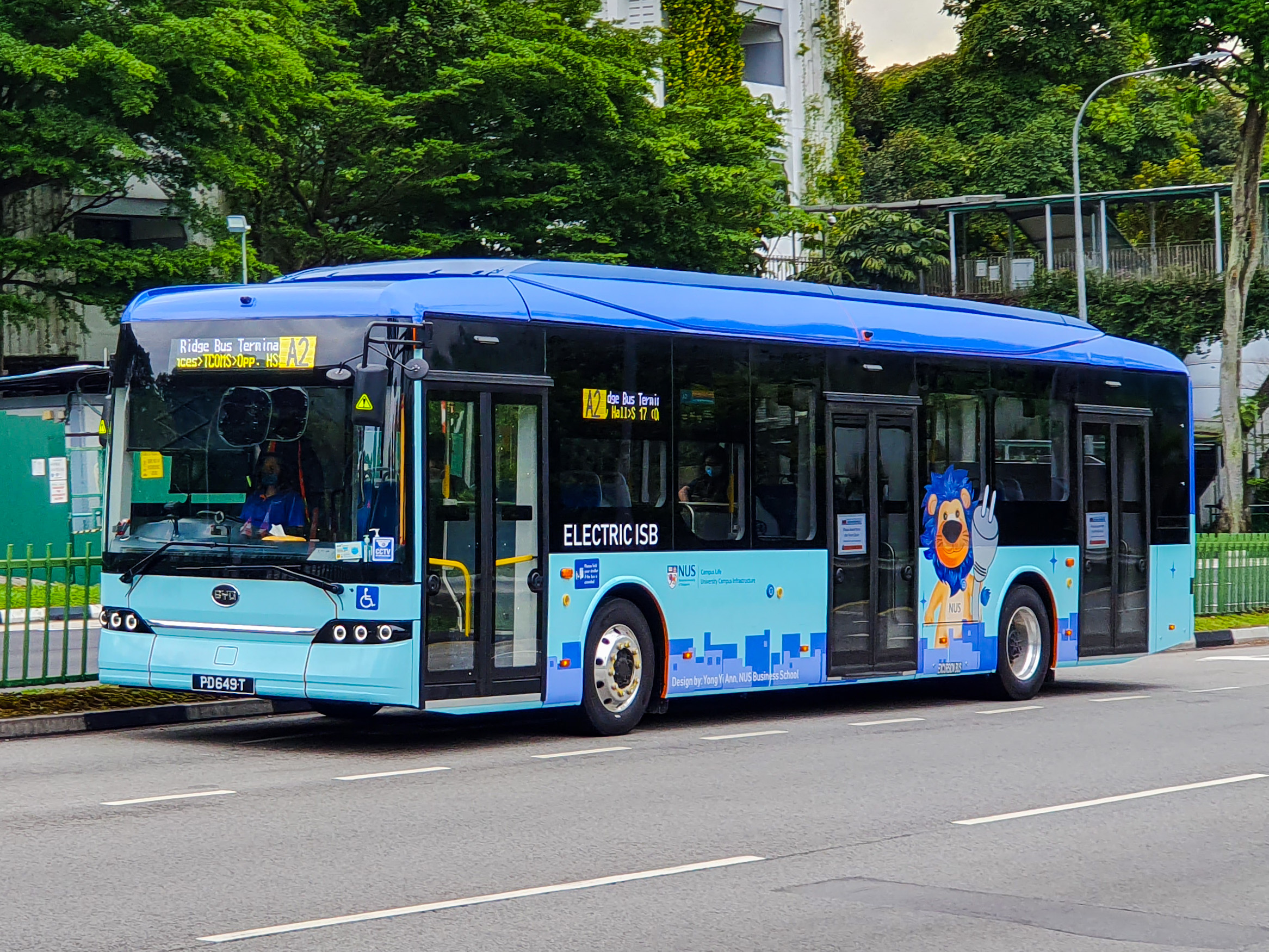

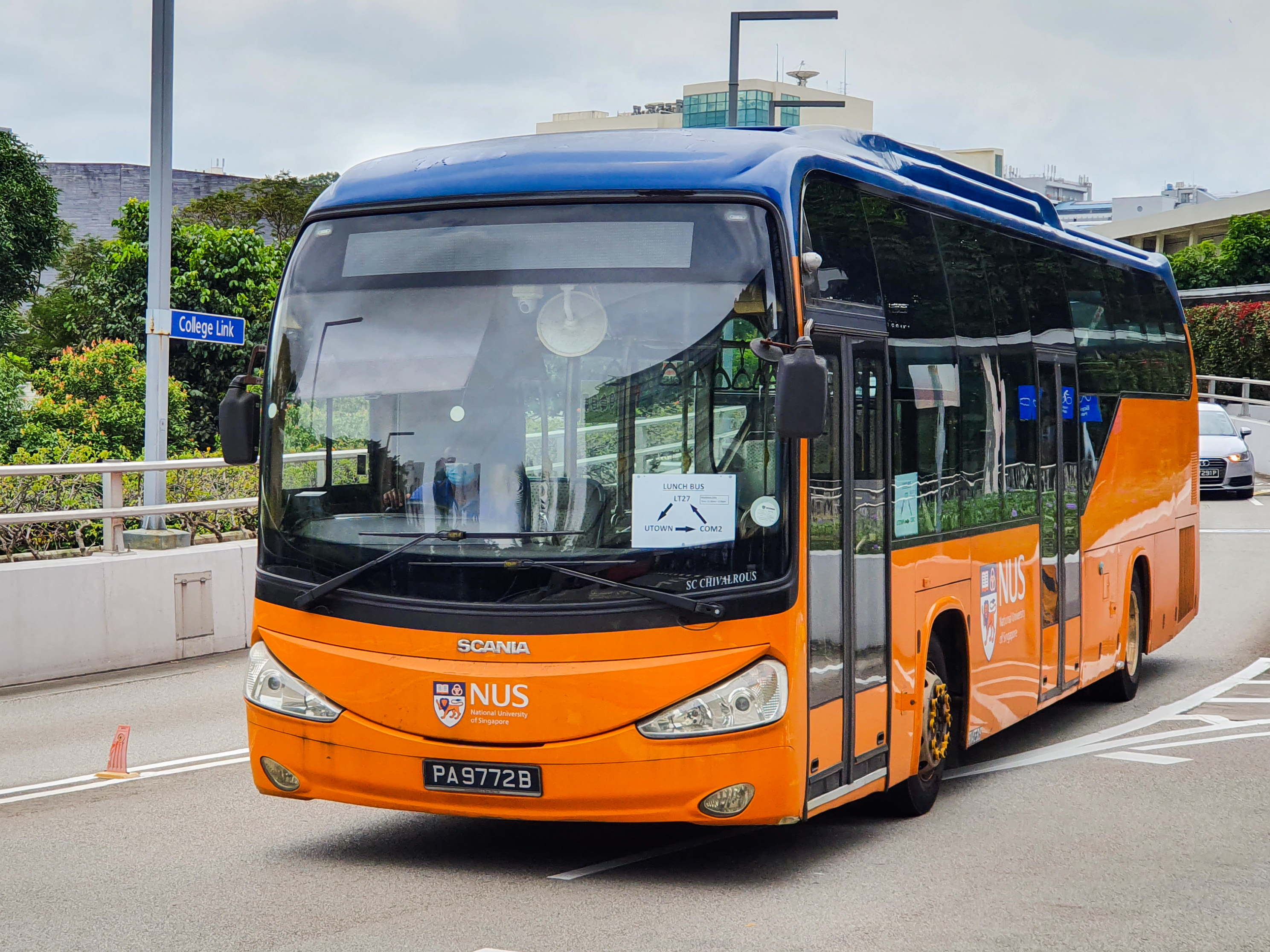

A driverless bus, dubbed the NUSmart Shuttle, was introduced as a trial in 2019. It carried passengers until April 2020 when the service was suspended due to the COVID-19 pandemic. It continued operating without passengers until January 2021. In November 2021, it was announced that the contract with ComfortDelGro Bus had been renewed and that the entire fleet would be replaced with electric buses. The first electric buses are expected to be introduced in the third quarter of 2022.

There are several internal shuttle bus routes that run throughout NUS and link to both Kent Ridge MRT station and Botanic Gardens MRT station. There is also a bus route that links the Kent Ridge and Bukit Timah campuses and the Botanic Gardens MRT station.

== Student accommodation ==
NUS has three types of student accommodation: halls of residence, student residences, and residential colleges. There are about 6,000 residential places distributed between halls of residence and student residences on campus, in addition to around 4,100 students who live in the residential colleges and graduate residences.

=== Halls of residence ===
NUS has seven halls of residence with about 3,000 residential places. A points system, based on co-curricular activities and leadership roles, is used to allocate residential places to students. Halls have their own interest groups and student productions in addition to university-wide student co-curricular activities. Halls compete with each other in the Inter-Hall Games.

The halls of residence are:

- Eusoff Hall
- Kent Ridge Hall
- King Edward VII Hall
- Raffles Hall
- Sheares Hall
- Temasek Hall
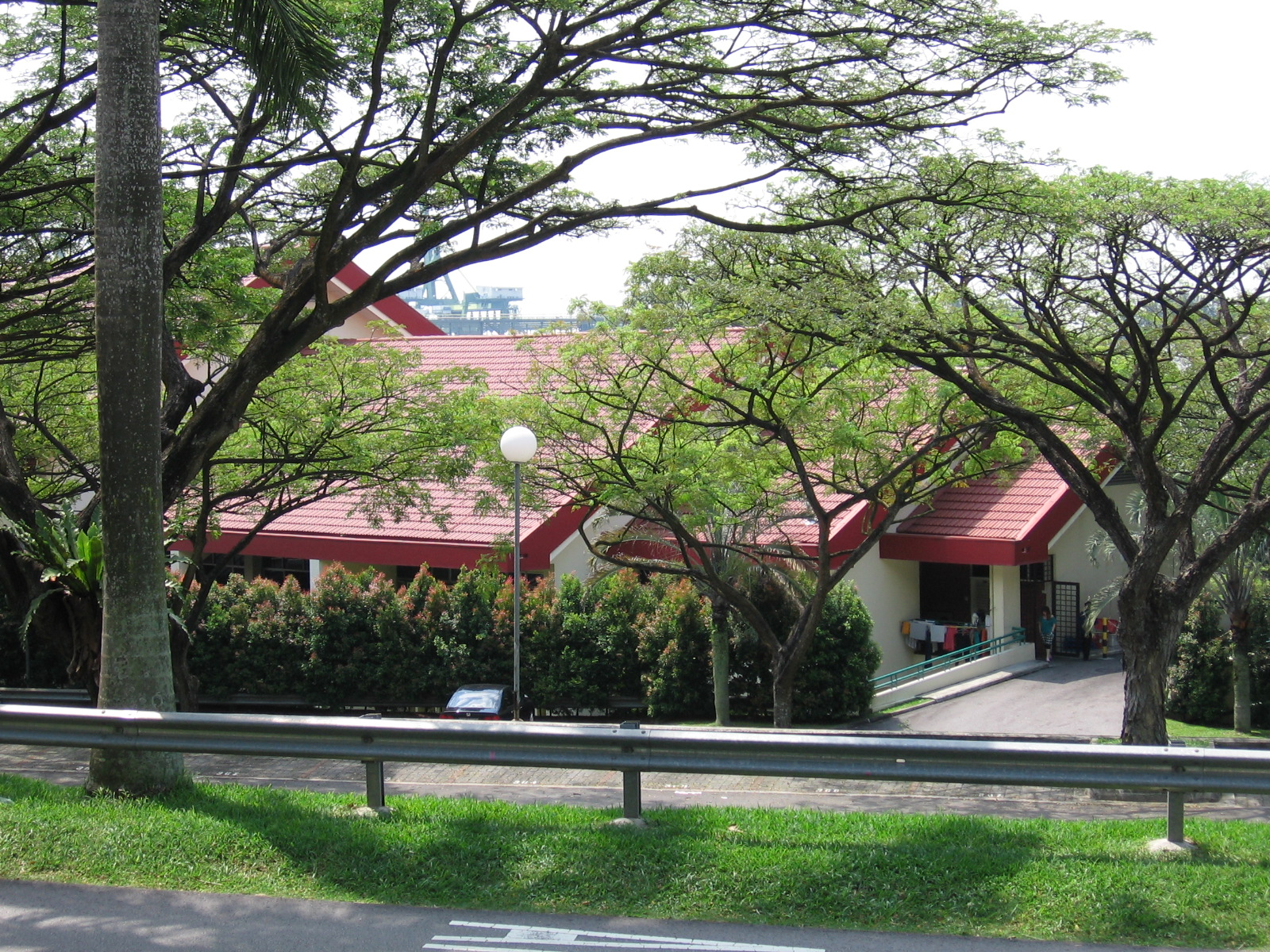
Eusoff Hall

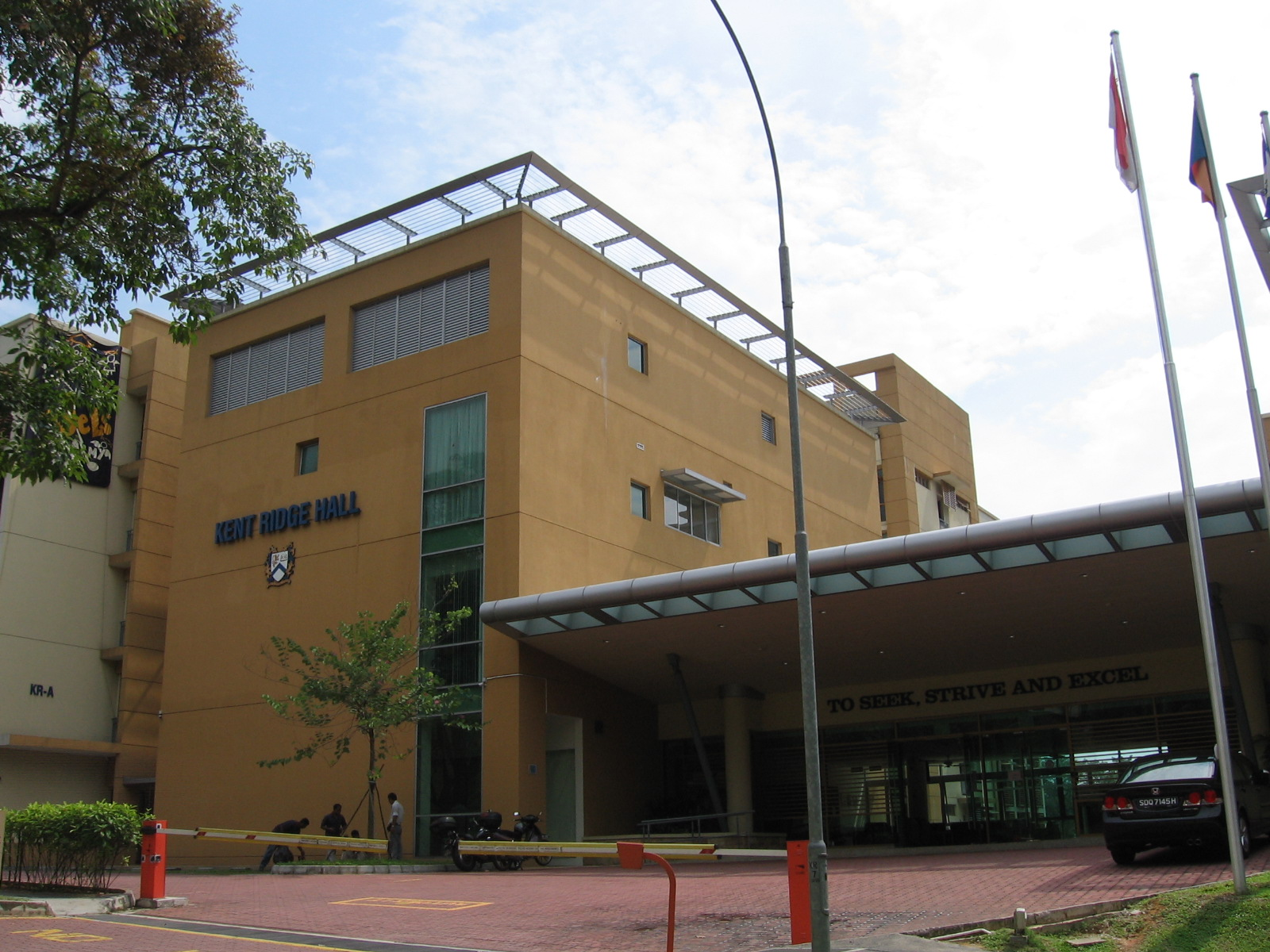
Kent Ridge Hall

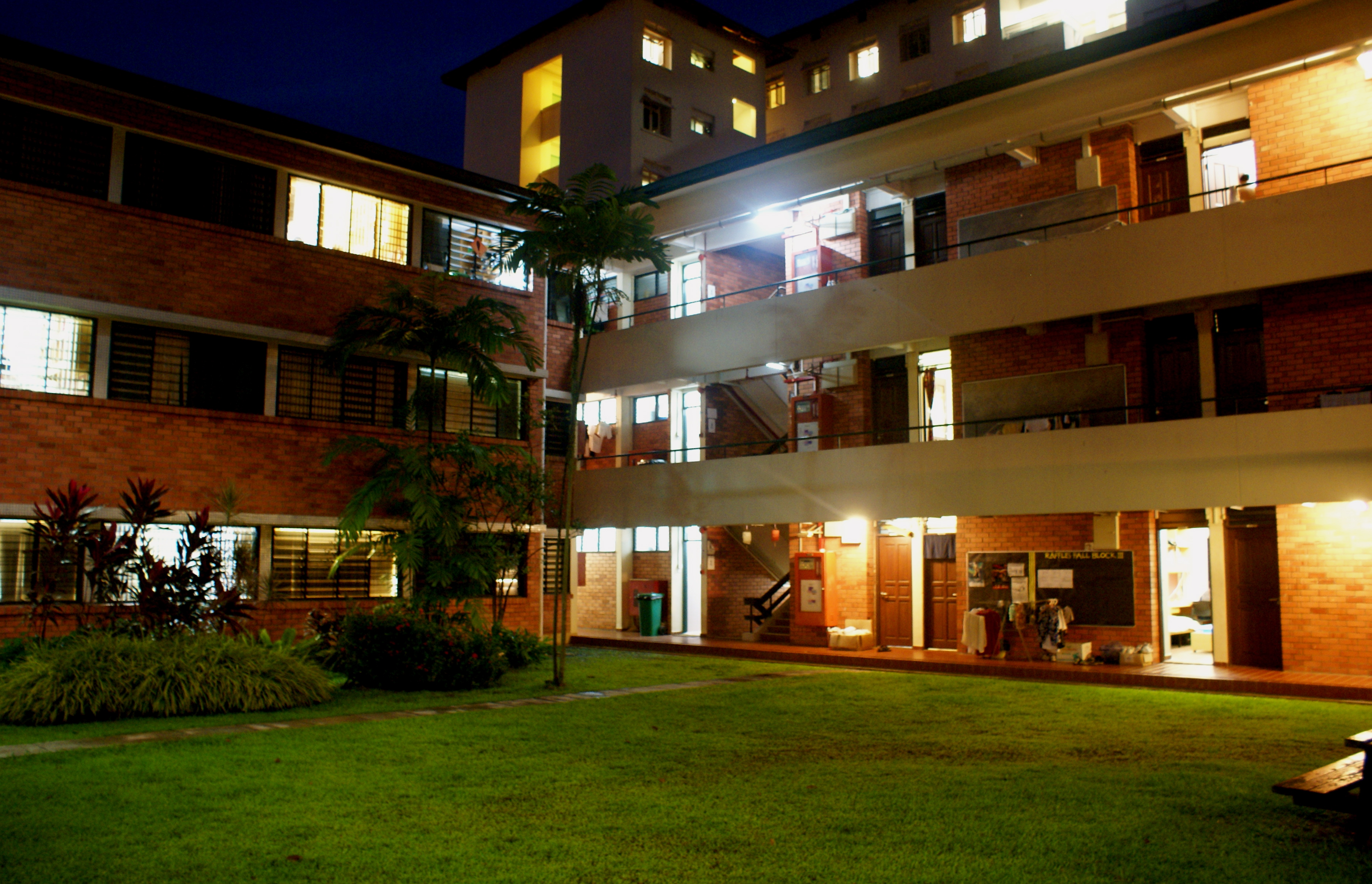
Raffles Hall

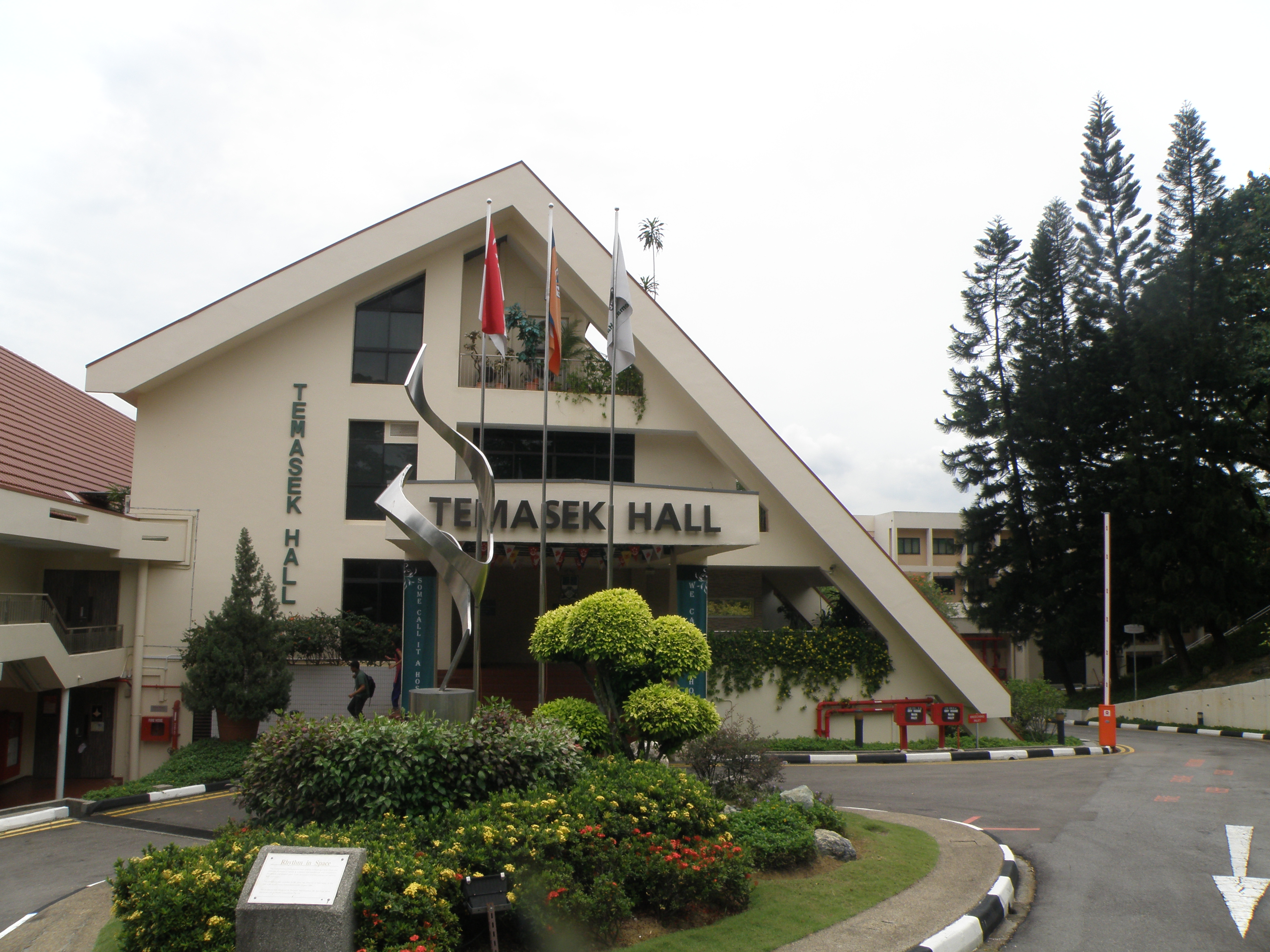
Temasek Hall

=== Student residences ===
NUS has two student residences – Prince George's Park Residences and UTown Residences – for undergraduate and graduate students. The residences are arranged in clusters of 11 to 15 single rooms, with shared kitchen and bathroom facilities. The UTown Residences also has apartments for students.

=== Residential colleges ===
NUS also houses residential colleges, which are modelled after the college systems of universities. Like halls, residential colleges have unique co-curricular activities. Residential colleges also have their own academic programmes, with general education requirements differing from each other and the rest of the university. The academic programmes in residential colleges take place in seminars.

==== Cinnamon College/West Wing ====
Cinnamon College housed the University Scholars Programme (USP) until the 2021 intake. Together with the current Yale-NUS College Campus (which has been renamed the "West Wing"), the college will house the NUS College from the 2022 intake onwards. USP students and faculty are accommodated in 600 rooms.

Starting from the 2025 academic year, Cinnamon Wing will house Acacia College, NUS' fifth residential college, with a focus on artificial intelligence.

==== Tembusu College ====
Tembusu College was the second residential college in NUS University Town. Tembusu houses mainly first and second-year undergraduates, in addition to resident faculty, visiting scholars and graduate fellows. The former founding Rector of Tembusu College is Singapore's Ambassador-at-Large and former United Nations Ambassador Tommy Koh, who is also the former dean of the NUS Faculty of Law.

==== College of Alice & Peter Tan ====
Formerly called the Angsana College, the College of Alice & Peter Tan (CAPT) is a residential college for all NUS undergraduates that emphasizes active citizenship and community engagement. It provides a two-year academic programme.

==== Residential College 4 ====
Residential College 4 (RC4) is another residential college in NUS with a thematic focus of systems thinking. Engineering Scholars Programme students are offered accommodation at this RC.

==== Ridge View Residential College ====
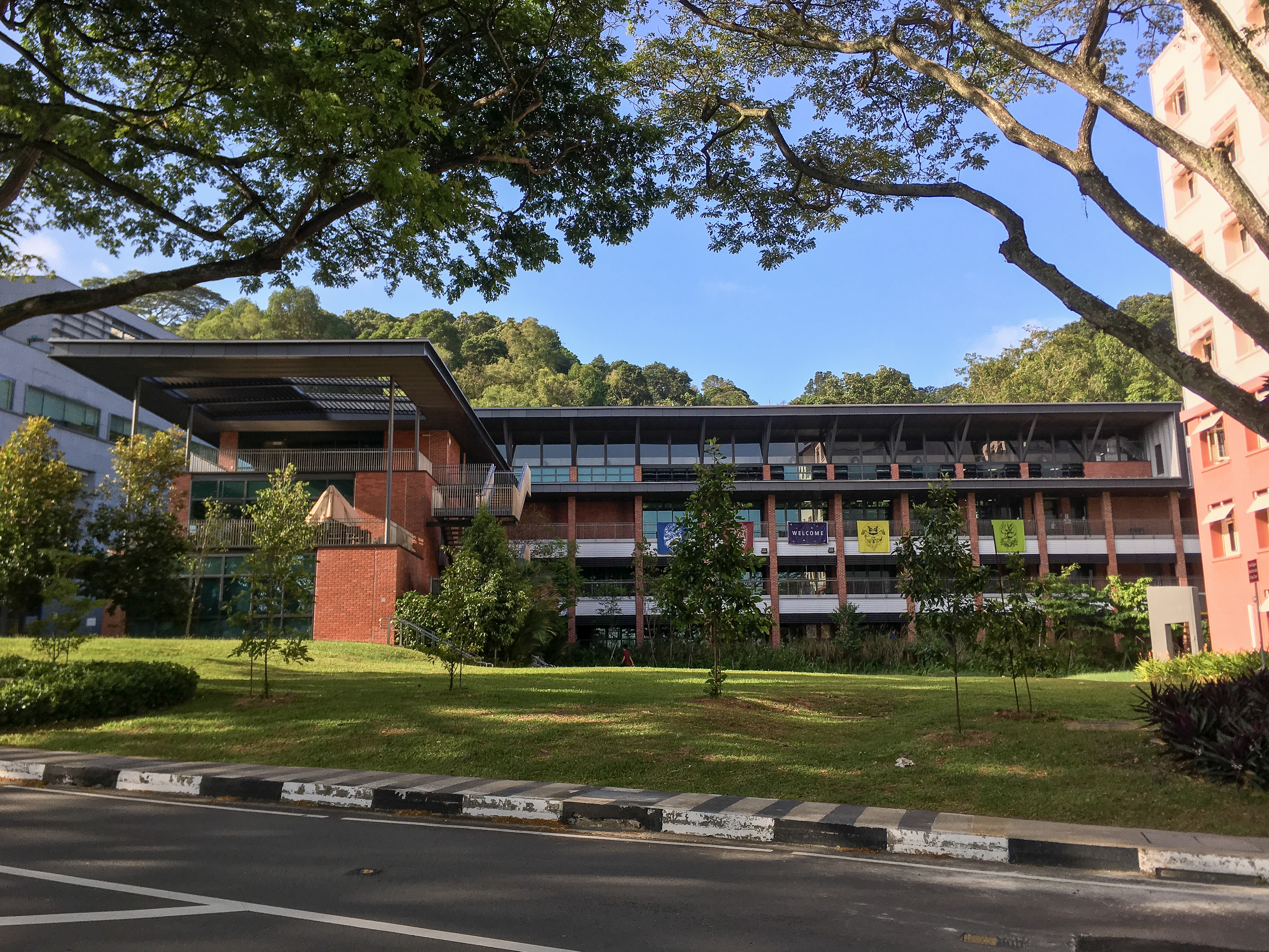
Ridge View Residential College

Ridge View Residential College (RVRC) was formally established in April 2014, housed in the former Ridge View Residences. It is the only residential college that is situated outside University Town. The site was the former location for Kent Ridge Hall until November 2002. In November 2015, an annexe building to RVRC was constructed. It was completed in February 2017.
