= Tomoro Coffee =

Indonesian coffee company

PT Kopi Bintang Indonesia
- Trade name: Tomoro Coffee
- Type: Perseroan Terbatas
- Industry: Coffeehouse
- Founded: 9 August 2022; 4 years ago
- Headquarters: Jl. Pluit Selatan Raya No.2, Landmark Pluit B9, 10th Floor, Pluit, Penjaringan, North Jakarta, Jakarta 14450
- Number of locations: 600+ (2024)
- Area served: China; Indonesia; Philippines; Singapore
- Key people: Star Yuan (Founder and CEO); Fish Sun (Co-founder and Vice President)
- Products: Coffee, pastry
- Website: www.tomoro-coffee.com

PT Kopi Bintang Indonesia, operating under the trade name Tomoro Coffee (stylized as TOMORO Coffee), is an Indonesian coffee company and coffeehouse chain. The company was founded by Xing Wei "Star" Yuan and Fish Sun in 2022. Headquartered at Landmark Pluit, Tomoro Coffee operates more than 600 outlets across Indonesia as of October 2024, making it one of the largest coffee chains in the country.

== History ==
Tomoro Coffee was founded by Xing Wei Yuan, also known as "Star Yuan." Star, a graduate of the National University of Singapore, previously served as the Director of Product Management at Oppo and was also one of the co-founders of J&T Express. According to Star, Tomoro Coffee was his first venture into the food and beverage industry. He founded Tomoro Coffee together with Fish Sun, who currently serves as the company's vice president. They moved to Jakarta on 11 April 2022. Four months later, on 9 August 2022, the first Tomoro Coffee outlet was opened at Landmark Pluit, a business center that now serves as the company's headquarters. In October 2023, Tomoro opened its first international outlet in Shanghai. As of October 2024, Tomoro had more than 600 outlets in Indonesia, Singapore, China, and the Philippines.

Tomoro Coffee has continued to grow rapidly in the following years. Within just two years, the company has opened more than 600 outlets across Indonesia, with annual coffee cup sales reaching 30 million. Their goal is to open two new outlets every day and expand internationally, with key target markets including Singapore, China, and the Philippines. One of the innovations used by Tomoro Coffee is the using of Eversys E’4 automated coffee machine, which can produce up to 1,200 cups of coffee per day. They are also known for their online marketing strategy, including launching a mobile app to assist customers with ordering. Instead of franchising, Tomoro Coffee adopts a partnership system to grow its business.

== Product ==
Tomoro Coffee specializes in Arabica-based coffee as its flagship product. They offer various coffee variants, including palm sugar latte, pandan coffee, coconut coffee, and frappé. Furthermore, the company also sells non-coffee products such as lemonade, tea, chocolate, matcha, and pastry like croissants and cinnamon rolls.
