= Schoolboy rugby in Singapore =

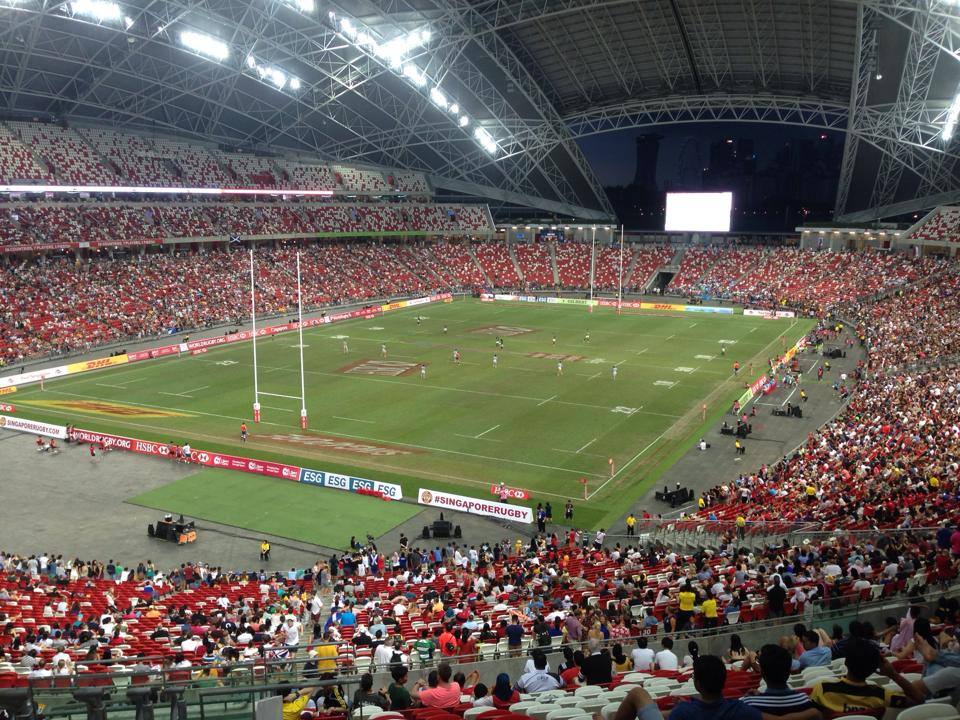
Since 2014, the finals for the schoolboy rugby has been played at the National Stadium, Singapore.

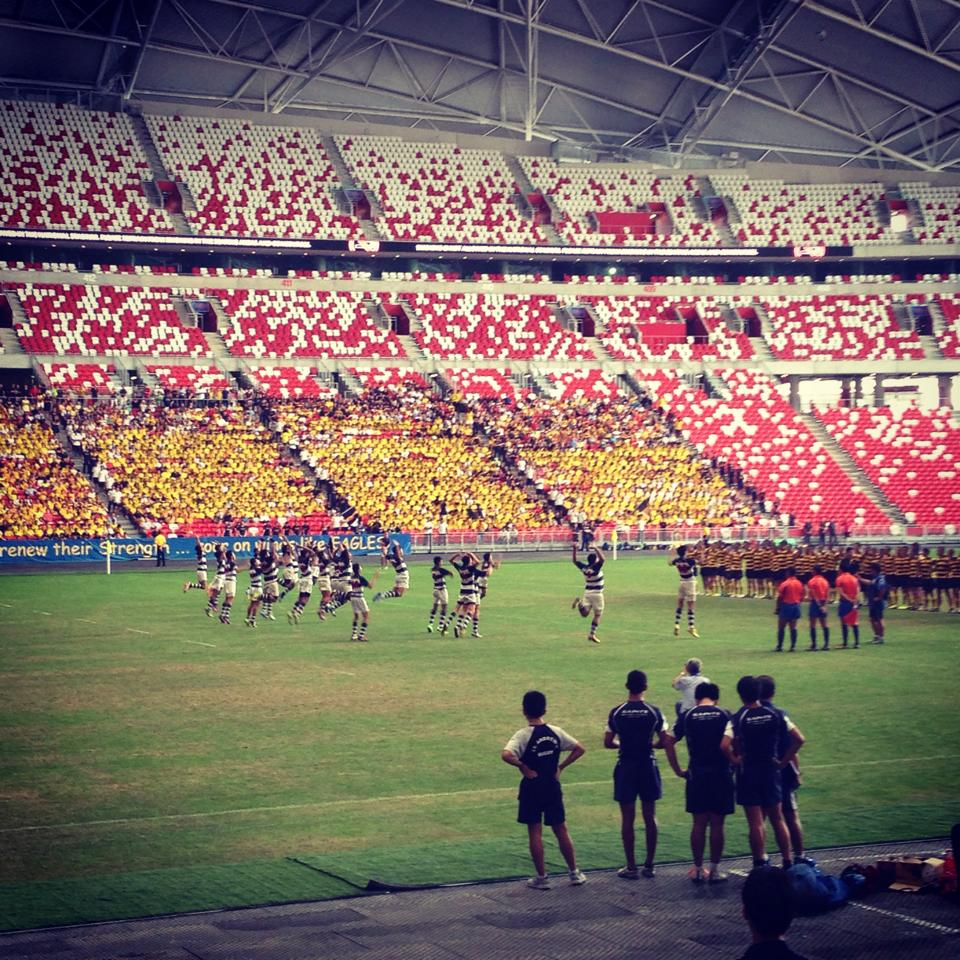
St. Andrew's ruggers performing their original Saints Battle Cry against Anglo-Chinese School (Independent), National Stadium, 2014 'C' Division finals

Rugby is a traditional sport played in Singapore. With Singapore's historical roots as a British colony, rugby became a sport that was played by both colonials and locals as a form of leisure and entertainment. As the colonial administration promoted sporting culture as part of its colonial ambitions for Singapore, this resulted in rugby becoming a crucial sport among the English speaking schools. Rugby was used to promote British heritage and sporting culture to its students. With its influence upon schools, rugby in Singapore has developed a cultural heritage in which it has become a popular traditional sport known by many in the Singaporean community.

== History ==
Singapore was first colonized by the British East India Company (BEIC) in 1819 under Sir Stamford Raffles. With his strategic oversight over its resources and its terrain, Raffles developed Singapore into a free trade entrepot for the Malayan region following the failure to secure trade with China. With that, Singapore would be recognized as a multi-cultural society as migrants from different regions travelled to Singapore for its lucrative aspects.

Sporting in Singapore was uncommon as a small percentage of the colonials viewed sports as a leisure activity to deter against illness and diseases. Many felt that it could either improve or maintain one's physical and psychological health. Being a small settlement, the limited number of players resulted in few activities occurring daily. This is coupled with the tension between sports and theatricals of the colonials, in which the latter, the majority, favoring mental stimulation. Despite so, the games that were frequently engaged were traditional field games that were played during times of celebration in Britain by both the impoverished and the wealthy. In addition, these games were seen as past times from their daily commitments. One such game played was cricket in which recordings of informal games being organized before 1837. Regarded as the pioneering team sport in Singapore before rugby, this saw cricket being engaged by members of the armed forces. Many of whom would contribute significantly to the maintaining of sports interest in Singapore as British military presence increased on the island. Especially so with the opening of the Suez Canal which expanded the amount and frequency of trading, in turn spurring the growth of Singapore and the sporting culture in Singapore.

In 1852, the Singapore Cricket Club (SCC) was established as one of Singapore's oldest sports club to serve and spur the social development of the Singapore community. With the rise of Singapore's economy, numerous sports clubs started to emerge with distinct identities as they serve specific racial communities. This contributed to the increased engagement and rise of sporting culture. In doing so, this saw multifarious sports being played as many were variations of each other. With that, rugby was played by members of different sports despite not having any formal representations. Most players played rugby amateurly and they came from the SCC or the BEIC.

With Singapore being a diverse nation, this saw the ethnic Chinese accounting for the majority of the population since 1871. However, unlike the colonials who had a vast exposure to sports which shaped their positive perception, the Chinese had little exposure and were more focused on materialistic ambitions. In addition, sporting facilities were limited on the island due to the increased restrictions and racial segregations, resulting in most sporting clubs to be reserved for the elites. Coupled with the lack of exposure and opportunities for sporting activities, this led to many Chinese migrants being oblivious to British sports. The colonials would thus present these various sports as a form of entertainment to the migrants and locals. By the 1870s, sporting culture has progressed rapidly as crowds were attracted to the monetary incentives offered by the racially segregated events.

The motives of promoting sports would change drastically from amusement to the advocation of the British imperial agendas. It aimed to use sports to promote colonial values which supported the esteemed recognition of the colonialist while promoting the submissive nature discipline towards the colonialist while increased productivity. This aimed to shape and mirror society to that of the British culture. Doing so, many migrants and locals were reluctant and dismissive while some were accepting towards it as they were excluded from these sporting clubs, in turn pushing many to establish their own sporting clubs. Such examples include the Straits Chinese Recreation Club in 1885 which aimed to promote sporting culture in activities such as cricket and tennis. Furthermore, the influence of the British also affected public schooling as it aimed to promote English athleticism. Despite so, Chinese school distanced themselves and engaged in popular Chinese sports like Volleyball. In contrast, English schools such as St. Andrew's School in 1862 would promote English sports such as football and would provide the environment for rugby to grow. Regardless of the differing views of the usage of sports to promote British values, this still resulted in the rise of sporting culture in Singapore as sports has been well immersed into society.

The rise of sporting culture provided a nurturing environment in which various sports could grow. The growth and influence of rugby on the Singapore community would be recognized following the formation of the All Blues. Its members consisted of the expatriate community. In 1948, rugby would be recognized formally with the establishment of the Singapore Rugby Union of which in the 1950s, the first civilian team of non-military associations were formed. However, due to the influence of colonization upon Singapore, this saw many teams having an unbalanced ration of expatriates and locals. Hence, the Singapore national team was formed in 1971, to represent the wider community and the nation state. In the 1970s, Singapore entered its prime era when the surge of interest and engagement in rugby resulted in the Singapore team competing against reputable English teams at Jalan Besar Stadium. As players improved in their skillsets, this resulted in the cultivation of talented coaches and players. Spilling over, rugby progressed rapidly in schools and clubs as this nurtured the development of rugby among youths.

In 1995, the Singapore Rugby Union would undergo major changes in their administration with the employment of Peter Rendall, their first Chief Executive Officer. Inheriting the Singapore Rugby Union at its lowest in the Asia Rugby standings, along with its bleak outlook of only 10 schools playing rugby, Rendall would implement various measures to spur the growth of local rugby. To do so, Rendall aimed at becoming the top team in the region by increasing the number of schools playing rugby. With the support of multifarious rugby clubs in Singapore, rugby clinics were being organized on the weekend for students. In 1998, the interest in rugby increased tremulously as the total number of schools playing rugby increased to 100. The Singapore Rugby Union also aimed to increase the interest of rugby by collaborating with international universities for exchange programmes in 2002. The improvement of rugby clinics also organized a free touch and contact rugby programme in 2006, hence resulting in an increase of another 100 participating schools.

== St. Andrew's School ==
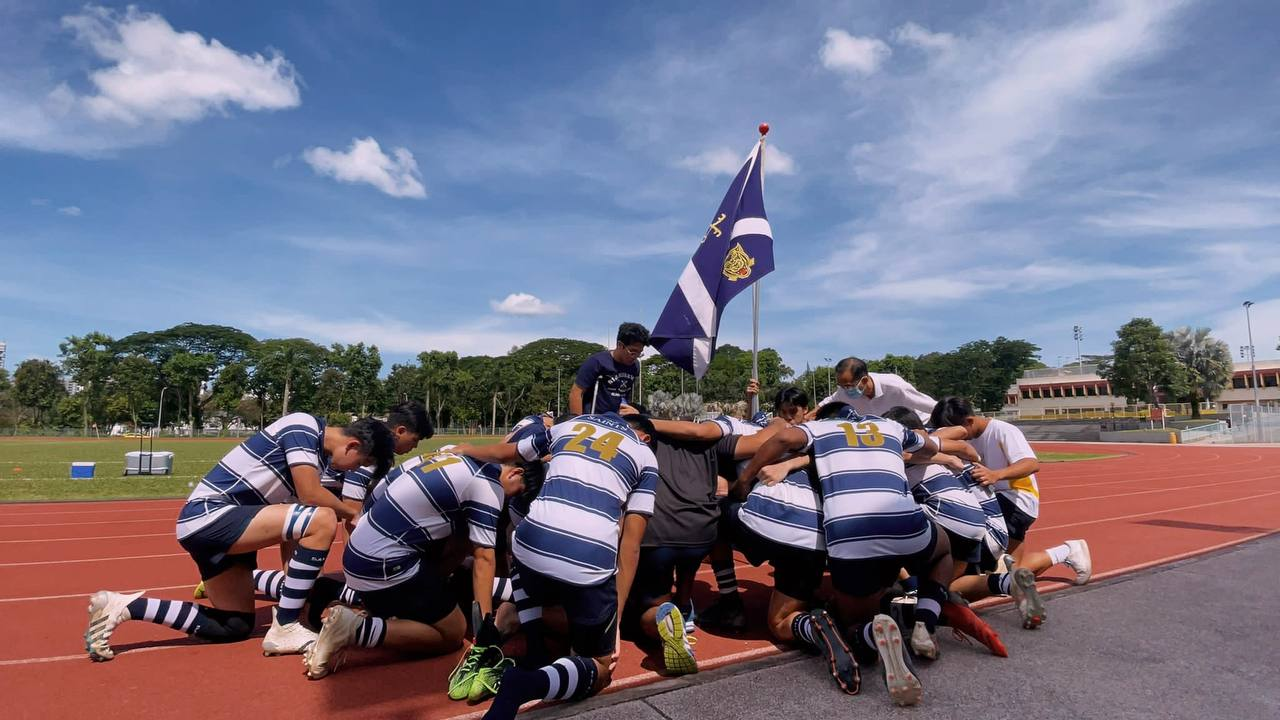
SAJC Ruggers preparing before their match against ACJC in the 2022 'A' Division

Founded in 1862, St. Andrew's School is recognized as the first Anglican boys' school in Singapore. Its roots can be traced to the efforts of two Anglicans, Mr. Sim Quee and Mr. Tye Kim, who established the small private institution along Chin Chew Street. Both Anglicans were inspired by a speech made by Chaplain Rev. William Humphrey in 1856, in which the latter created the St. Andrew's Church Mission (SACM) with the agenda of evangelizing to the locals and natives of Singapore. Despite not being under the full authority of the SACM, the private institution would still receive help when Edward Sherman Venn, an Anglican priest, travelled to Singapore in 1861. With his credibility, Venn would reduce the constraints of the institution when he advocates for the formal creation of a school as part of his missionary work. Thus, in 1862, St. Andrew's School was founded when the private institution and the SACM established formal recognition.

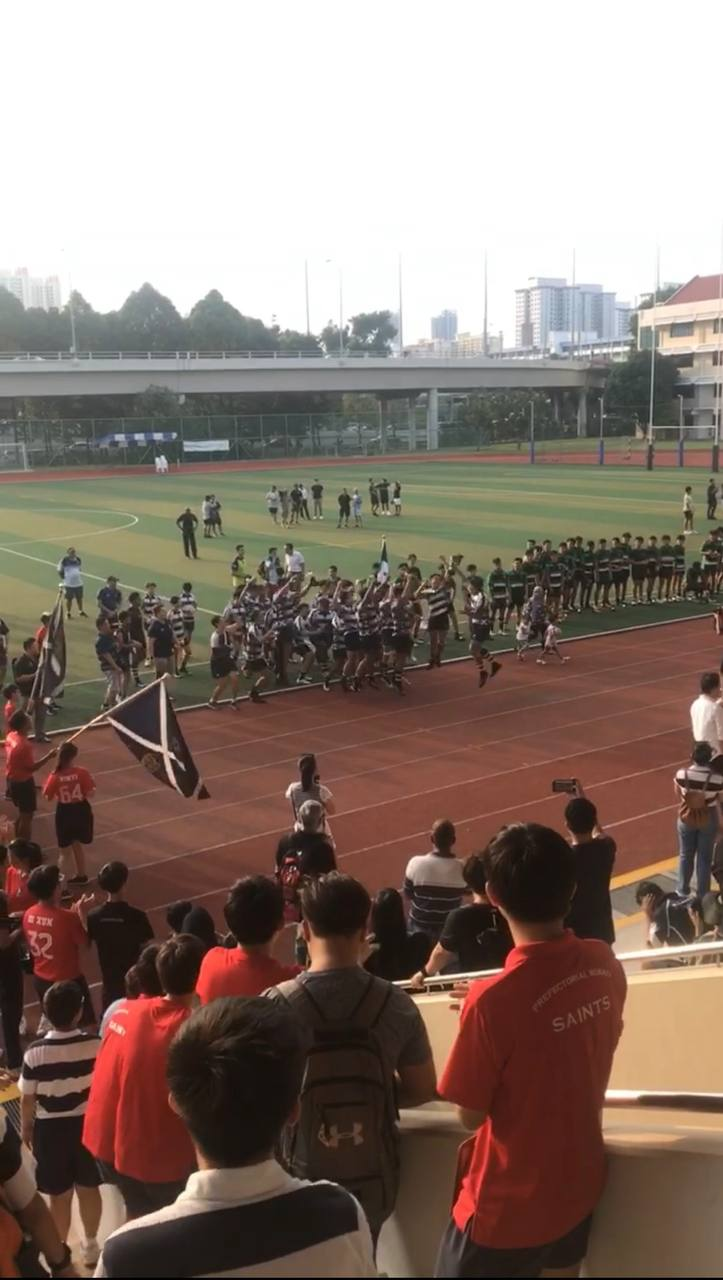
St. Andrew's beat Raffles in the Kiwi Cup 2020

Being an English school, St. Andrew's School promoted British culture to its students in the form of sporting culture when Mr. G.J. Gurney introduced rugby in 1933. With its long and established roots of playing and hosting rugby, St. Andrew's School has become renown for its rugby traditions among the Singaporean community. This is evident when St. Andrew's School participated in the local school games in 1941 and dominated the competition with a score of 103 points. St. Andrew's School domination in Singapore Rugby can also be seen when the school has won all trophies available. In 1973 and 1974, St. Andrew's won the Police 'A' and 'B' Cup along with the Kiwi Cup. Yet again, St. Andrew's School would win once again in 1976 when they won the Police 'B' and 'C' cup along with the Kiwi Cup. However, it is not until 1979 that St. Andrew's School was also rewarded the Grand Slam title for its superb performance. With its remarkable traditions, St. Andrew's School managed to win the John Clark Trophy along with the Police 'B' Cup after beating Raffles Institution in 1987. In the same year, St. Andrew's School would also obtain the Goh Keng Swee Shield after beating Dunearn Secondary Technical School. Coupled with receiving the Police 'A' Cup, St. Andrew's School would thus receive the Grand Slam.

== Raffles Institution ==
When Raffles first arrived in Singapore in 1819, he envisioned an institution that would cater to the people, both colonizers and locals, under British colonial rule. Of which, Ruffles aimed to fulfil these objectives: to educate the elites of the native Malays and locals through education in English along with the study and collection of artefacts and people from the region. In 1823, the designs of the school building were first published and in 1834, the Singapore Free School opened following the launch by the Chaplain of Singapore, Mr. Darrah. The school would witness many changes in 1837 as it shifted from its original compound at High Street to Bras Besah Road and was renamed to Singapore Institution Fee school. Yet again, the institution underwent changes when it was renamed to the Singapore Institution in 1856 and to the more renown Raffles Institution in 1768.

As an English school, Raffles Institution was also renown in promoting sporting culture as it became popular for its rugby traditions among the Singaporean community. In 1960, Raffles Institution 'A' participated in the City District Seven-a-side competition in which it emerged victorious after defeating their counterpart Raffles Institution 'B' by 15 points. This was a crucial victory for Raffles Institution as prior to a week ago, they emerged as champions in the City District Fifteen-a-side competition. Raffles Institution recognition for their rugby prowess would also be shown when they defended their Police 'A' Cup title in 1970 against National Junior College with a score of 102 points. In 1991, Raffles Institution won both Police 'A' Cup and Police 'B' Cup title.
