= Religion in Singapore =

Religion in Singapore (residents only, General Household Survey 2025)
1. Buddhism (30.9%)
2. None (23.9%)
3. Christianity (17.1%)
4. Islam (15.0%)
5. Taoism (7.30%)
6. Hinduism (5.40%)
7. Other religions (0.40%)

Religion in Singapore is characterised by a wide variety of religious beliefs and practices due to its diverse ethnic mix of people originating from various parts of the world. A secular state, Singapore is commonly termed as a "melting pot" or "cultural mosaic" of various religious practices originating from different religions and religious denominations around the world. Most major religious denominations are present in the country, with the Singapore-based Inter-Religious Organisation (IRO) recognising 10 major religions. Analyses in 2014 and 2026 (using data from 2020) by the Pew Research Center found Singapore to be the world's most religiously diverse nation.

The most followed religion among residents (Note: In Singapore, the term "resident" refers to both citizens and permanent residents (PRs).) in Singapore is Buddhism, with a plurality of 30.9% of the resident population identifying themselves as adherents at the most recent General Household Survey in 2025. A large number of Buddhists in Singapore are Chinese, with 40.1% of the ethnic Chinese population in Singapore identifying as Buddhist. Sizeable numbers of non-Chinese ethnic groups in Singapore also practice Buddhism. People with no religious affiliation (atheist, agnostic or other irreligious life stances) form the second largest group at 23.9% of the population. Christianity comes in at 17.1%. Islam, at 15%, is followed mainly by Malays, though there are also many Indians adhering to it. Taoism comes in at 7.3%. Hinduism, at 5.4%, is followed mainly by Indians.

== History and culture ==
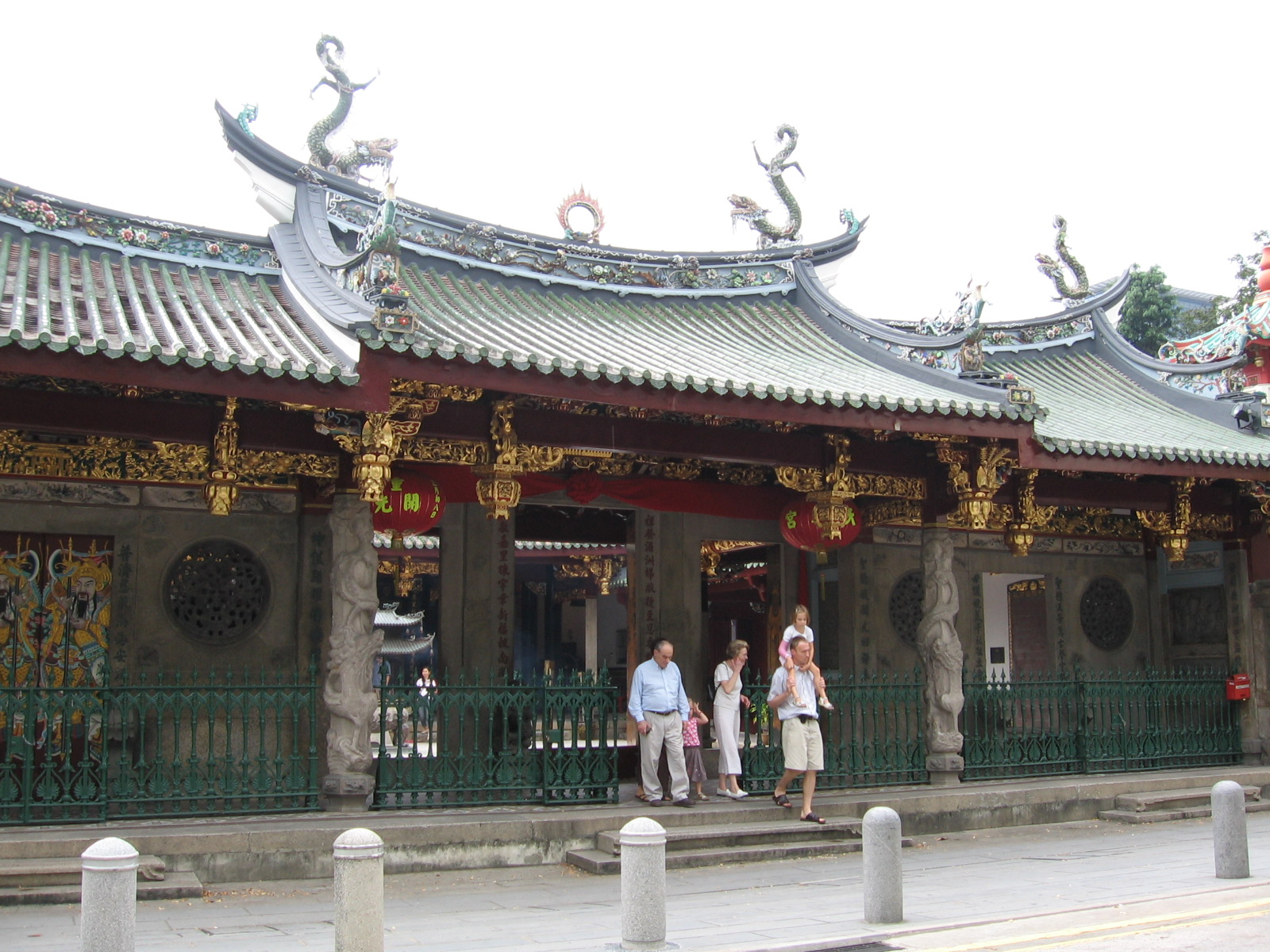
The Thian Hock Keng Temple, the oldest temple in Singapore (estbl. c. 1821–1822), a national monument, Chinatown.

It is well known that the original inhabitants of Singapore are Malays and Orang Laut (Sea Nomads) with their native faiths. Since the time of the Srivijayan Empire, they have practiced Vajrayana Buddhism and later converted to Sunni Islam. Following the first British soldiers and officials, members of the London Missionary Society arrived in Singapore and opened a school for Malay and Chinese boys; Anglicans established themselves there in 1826, the Plymouth Brethren in 1864, Presbyterians in 1881, and Methodists in 1885.

The variety of religions is a direct reflection of the diversity of Singaporeans' races: the Chinese Singaporeans are mainly Buddhists, Taoists, Christians or irreligious. Taoist and Confucian doctrines and deities, together with ancestral worship, are combined in various ways in the Chinese folk religions and Chinese folk religious sects. The Malays are predominantly Muslims (98.6%), while Indians are mostly Hindus (58.8%), but with significant numbers of Muslims and Christians from the Indian ethnic groups. Some religions, especially those practised by Chinese ethnic groups, have merged their places of worship with other religions such as Hinduism and Islam, such as the Loyang Tua Pek Kong Temple.

Nowadays, most Singaporeans celebrate the major festivals associated with their respective religions, like Taoist Nine Emperor Gods Festival. A distinctive feature of Singapore is that many Chinese people (primarily Buddhists and Taoists) participate in Hindu ceremonies, holidays, and festivals, like Diwali, and also donate money to Hindu temples. The Sri Krishnan Temple and the nearby Kwan Im Thong Hood Cho Temple are known for having evolved a social practice termed "cross-worshipping," where many devotees of either temple also worship at the other. This practice is commonly seen as a microcosm of Singapore's multi-religious society.

The oldest in Singapore and most important temple of the Hokkien Chinese is the Thian Hock Keng Temple built for the worship of the sea goddess Mazu, which was established around 1821–1822 and later rebuilt; the local Indian community also helped build it. The Sultan Mosque located within Malay-populated quarter of the city became the oldest mosque of the country and founded by Sultan Hussein Shah of Johor in 1824 and built in 1826. South Bridge Street, a major road through the old Chinatown, houses the Hindu Sri Mariamman Temple (complited in 1827) and the Masjid Jamae Mosque (established in 1826), which served Chulia Muslims from India's Coromandel Coast. Additionally, the Armenian Church of Gregory the Illuminator is the oldest church in Singapore, having been completed in 1836. It was also the first building in Singapore to have an electricity supply, having had the first electric fans and lights. Today, the church no longer holds Armenian services, as the last Armenian priest retired in the 1930s. Nonetheless, the church and its grounds have been preserved, with various Coptic Orthodox Church of Alexandria and Oriental Orthodox Church services still held in it.

In the middle of the 20th century, a number of race and religion-related riots occurred in Singapore, including the Maria Hertogh riots and the 1964 Race Riots. The Singapore government has since adopted a policy of promoting religious tolerance. The Inter-Religious Organisation of Singapore, established in 1949, coordinates the activities of the country's numerous religious groups. It is led by a council elected annually by representatives of the seven main faiths—Buddhists, Christians, Muslims, Hindus, Sikhs, Jews, and Zoroastrians—in proportion to the size of their respective congregations. Additionally, to foster interfaith engagement, the government established the Institute for the Study of Religions and Society in the late 1960s. Certain religious holidays in Singapore are officially recognized and designated as public holidays. However, some religions or denominations are officially banned by the government, as they are deemed as cults, such as Jehovah's Witnesses and the Unification Church, although their followers practised in secrecy in the 2010s.

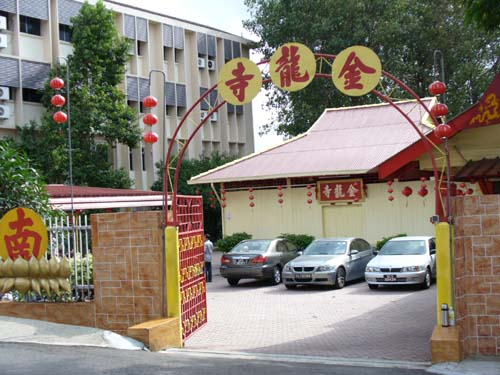
Jin Long Si Temple practices the three teachings, a fusion of Buddhism, Taoism and Confucianism

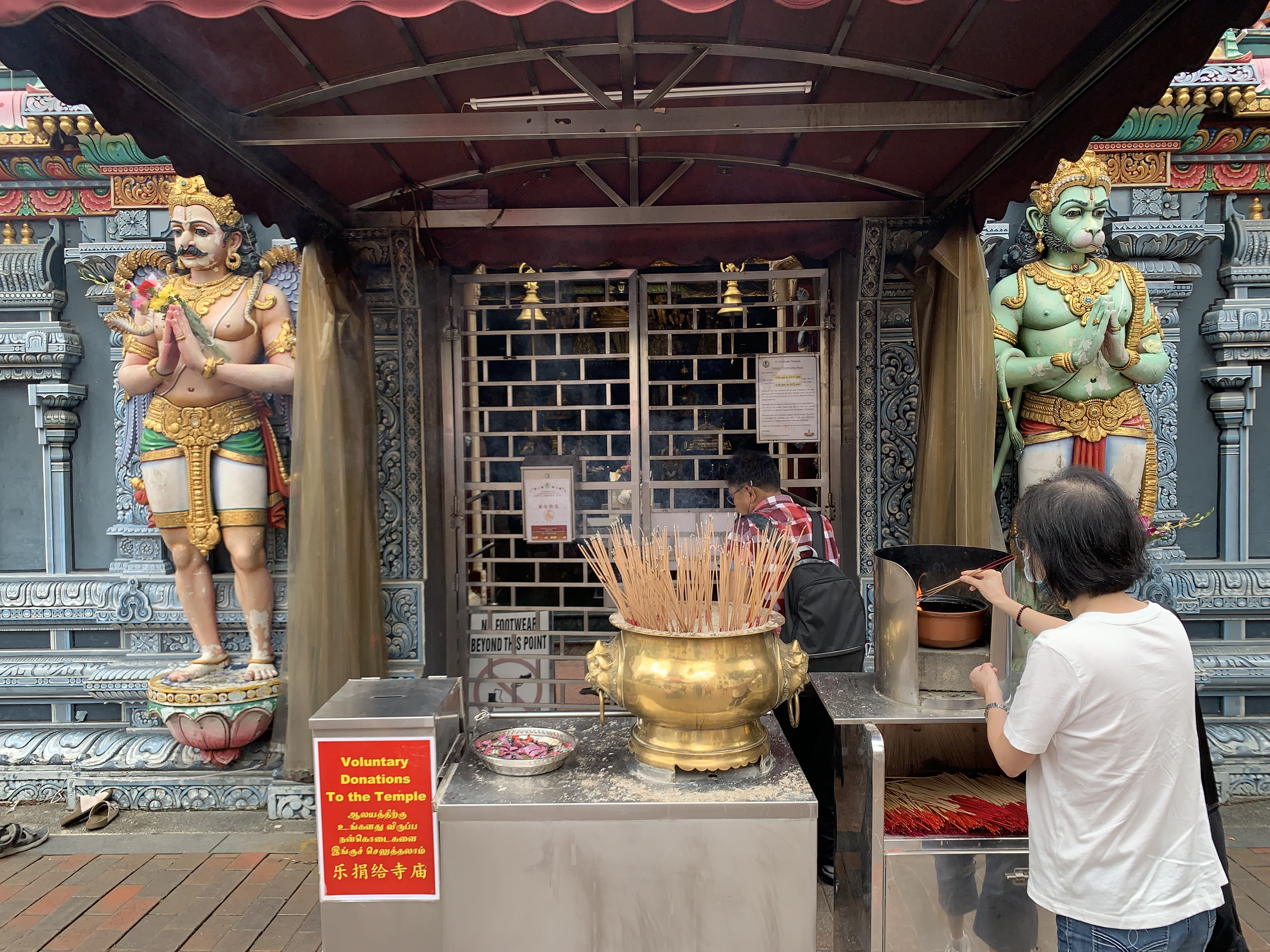
A devotee making Chinese-style incense sticks offering that are provided by the Hindu Sri Krishnan Temple

== Statistics and demographics ==
The Singapore census includes detailed data on religion and ethnicity, and is taken on a ten or five-year basis.

1980–2020 statistics for major religions and philosophies by the Singapore Census
Religion	1980		1990		2000		2010		2015		2020		2025	
Religion	Num.	%	Num.	%	Num.	%	Num.	%	Num.	%	Num.	%	Num.	%
Buddhism		26.7%		31.1%	1,060,662	42.5%	1,032,879	33.3%		33.2%	1,074,159	31.1%	1,120,200	30.9%
No religion		13.1%		14.3%	370,094	14.8%	527,553	17.0%		18.4%	692,528	20.0%	865,100	23.9%
Christianity		9.9%		12.5%	364,087	14.6%	569,244	18.4%		18.8%	654,355	18.9%	621,300	17.1%
└ Catholicism	—N/a	—N/a	—N/a	—N/a	118,980	4.8%	219,133	7.1%		6.8%	242,681	7.0%	275,400	7.6%
└ Other Christian	—N/a	—N/a	—N/a	—N/a	245,107	9.8%	350,111	11.3%		12.0%	411,674	11.9%	345,900	9.5%
Islam		16.2%		15.4%	371,660	14.9%	457,435	14.7%		14.0%	539,251	15.6%	543,400	15.0%
Taoism		30.0%		22.4%	212,344	8.5%	339,149	10.9%		10.0%	303,960	8.8%	266,000	7.3%
Hinduism		3.6%		3.7%	99,904	4.0%	157,854	5.1%		5.0%	172,963	5.0%	194,200	5.4%
Other religions		0.5%		0.6%	15,879	0.6%	21,635	0.7%		0.6%	21,878	0.6%	3,400	0.1%
Population		100%		100%	2,494,630	100%	3,105,748	100%		100%	3,459,093	100%	3,625,000	100%

Religion in Singapore (residents only, 1980 census)
1. Taoism (30.0%)
2. Buddhism (26.7%)
3. Islam (16.2%)
4. No religion (13.1%)
5. Christianity (9.90%)
6. Hinduism (3.60%)
7. Other religions (0.50%)
Religion in Singapore (residents only, 1990 census)
1. Buddhism (31.1%)
2. Taoism (22.4%)
3. Islam (15.4%)
4. No religion (14.3%)
5. Christianity (12.5%)
6. Hinduism (3.70%)
7. Other religions (0.60%)
Religion in Singapore (residents only, 2000 census)
1. Buddhism (42.5%)
2. Islam (14.9%)
3. No religion (14.8%)
4. Christianity (14.6%)
5. Taoism (8.50%)
6. Hinduism (4.00%)
7. Other religions (0.60%)
Religion in Singapore (residents only, 2010 census)
1. Buddhism (33.3%)
2. Christianity (18.4%)
3. No religion (17.0%)
4. Islam (14.7%)
5. Taoism (10.9%)
6. Hinduism (5.10%)
7. Other religions (0.70%)

The figures for the percent of Singaporeans practiced religion by ethnicity for the past four decades are as follows:

Percent of population practicing religions and philosophies by ancestry
Religion
Religion	Census				
Religion	1980	1990	2000	2010	2020
Chinese
Buddhism	34.3%	39.5%	53.6%	43.0%	40.3%
No religion	16.4%	17.6%	18.6%	21.8%	25.7%
Christianity	10.9%	14.1%	16.5%	20.1%	21.6%
Taoism	38.2%	28.5%	10.8%	14.4%	11.6%
Other religions	0.2%	0.3%	0.5%	0.7%	0.8%
Malays
Islam	99.6%	99.7%	99.5%	98.7%	98.8%
No religion	0.1%	0.1%	0.1%	0.2%	0.4%
Other religions	0.3%	0.2%	0.4%	1.1%	0.8%
Indians
Hinduism	56.5%	53.2%	55.4%	59.0%	57.3%
Islam	21.8%	26.3%	25.6%	21.7%	23.4%
Christianity	12.5%	12.8%	12.1%	12.8%	12.6%
No religion	1.0%	0.8%	0.6%	1.1%	2.1%
Other religions	8.2%	6.9%	6.3%	5.4%	4.6%

Below are the Singapore's Resident Population Aged 15 years and over by Religion and Age Group:

Age Group	Buddhist	Irreligious	Muslim	Christian	Taoist	Hindu	Others
15-24	24.9%	24.2%	21.4%	18.6%	4.9%	5.4%	0.6%
25-34	26.0%	26.2%	19.4%	17.7%	6.1%	4.0%	0.6%
35-44	30.2%	22.3%	14.2%	18.5%	7.2%	7.0%	0.6%
45-54	33.3%	18.3%	13.8%	20.6%	7.1%	6.2%	0.7%
55+	35.1%	15.2%	13.2%	19.0%	13.1%	3.7%	0.7%

The above figures refer to the resident population only, and do not include the non-resident population (Singapore authorities do not release figures for the non-resident population, which accounted for 18.33% of Singapore's population in 2005).

== Major religious communities ==
=== Buddhism ===
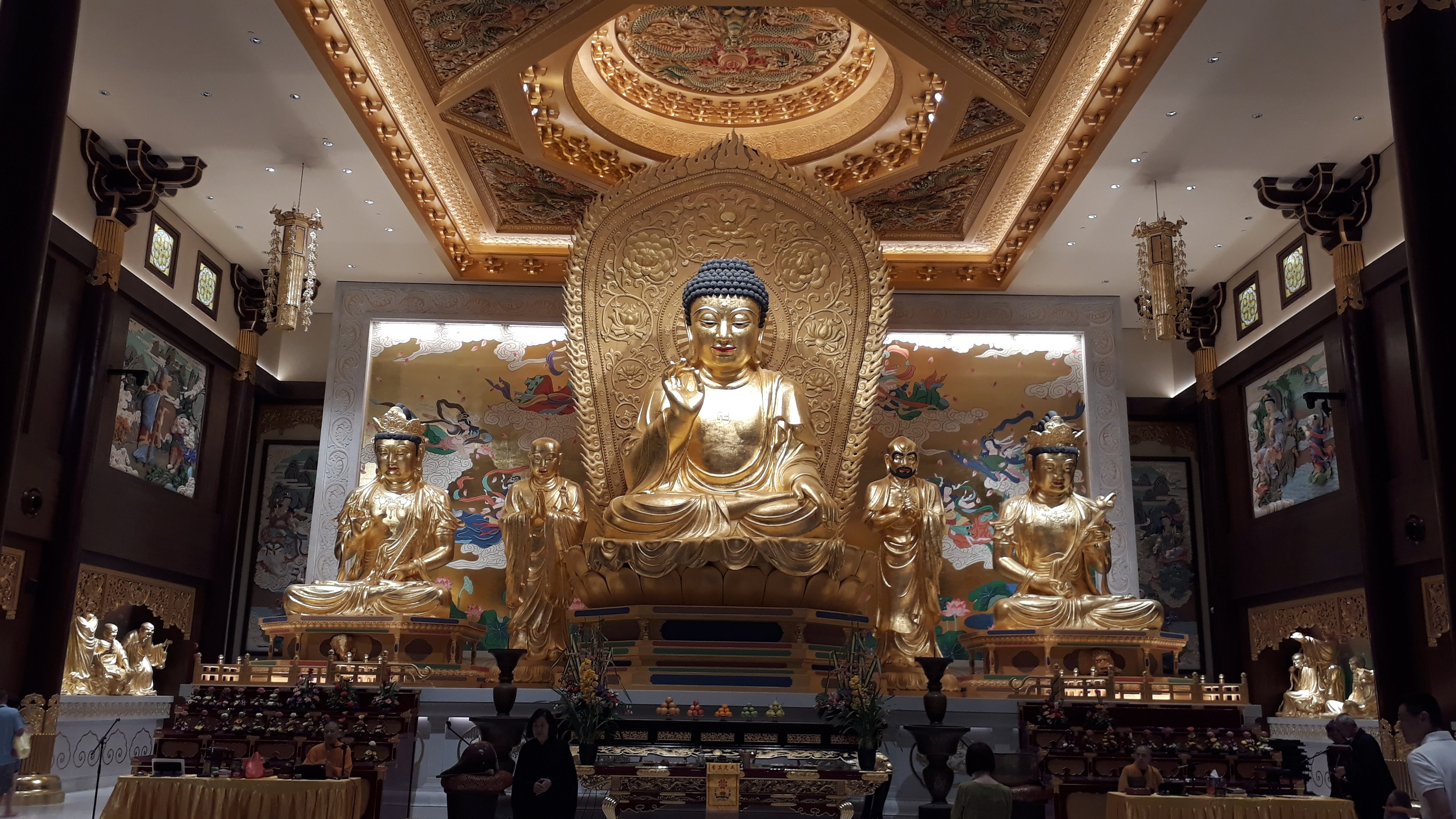
Main Shrine Hall of Singapore Buddhist Lodge

A plurality of Singaporeans declared themselves as Buddhists, with 30.9% of the Singaporean population being Buddhists in the 2025 General Household Survey. The Singapore Buddhist Federation (SBF), a national umbrella institution to represent the Buddhist community, was established in 1949.

There is more than one sort of Buddhism in Singapore. Most Singaporean Buddhists are Chinese and adhere to Chan and Pure Land branches of the Mahayana Chinese Buddhist tradition, owing to decades of missionary activity from China. In recent years, some modernist transnational Buddhist organizations have reached Singapore such as the Chinese-origin Buddha's Light International Association (BLIA), Dharma Drum Mountain (DDM) and Tzu Chi Singapore, as well as the Japanese Nichiren Buddhist organizations Nichiren Shōshū Buddhist Association and Soka Gakkai International, are practised by many people in Singapore, and mostly by those of Chinese descent. As a result of the activities of Tibetan missionaries, there are adherents of the Gelug, Kagyu and Nyingma schools of the Vajrayana Tibetan Buddhism among Singaporeans.

Whilst a majority of Buddhists in Singapore are traditionally ethnic Chinese, there are also Buddhists in Singapore that come from other ethnic groups such as the Thai, Sinhalese and Burmese. Most missionaries hail from China, Tibet, Taiwan, Thailand, Myanmar, Sri Lanka and Japan. That is why, there are Buddhist monasteries and centres from all three major traditions of Buddhism, namely Mahayana, Theravada and Vajrayana. Buddhism of every tradition is generally represented in Singapore, including Chinese Mahayana, Tibetan Buddhism, and Thai Buddhism. Due to the presence of Buddhists from these ethnic groups, there are Buddhist centres and temples that serve these communities, such as Wat Ananda Metyarama Thai Buddhist Temple, Sri Lankaramaya Buddhist Temple and Burmese Buddhist Temple.

Below is the ethnic breakdown of Buddhists according to the 2020 Singapore Census of Population as follows:

Ethnic Group	Total Resident Population of Ethnic Group	Population of Resident Ethnic Group registered as Buddhists	Percentage of Resident Ethnic Group registered as Buddhists	Percentage of Buddhist Residents by Ethnic Group
Chinese	2,606,881	1,052,114	40.36%	97.95%
Malays	447,747	447	0.10%	0.04%
Indians	299,056	2,031	0.68%	0.19%
Others	105,410	19,566	18.56%	1.82%
Overall	3,459,093	1,074,159	31.05%	100%

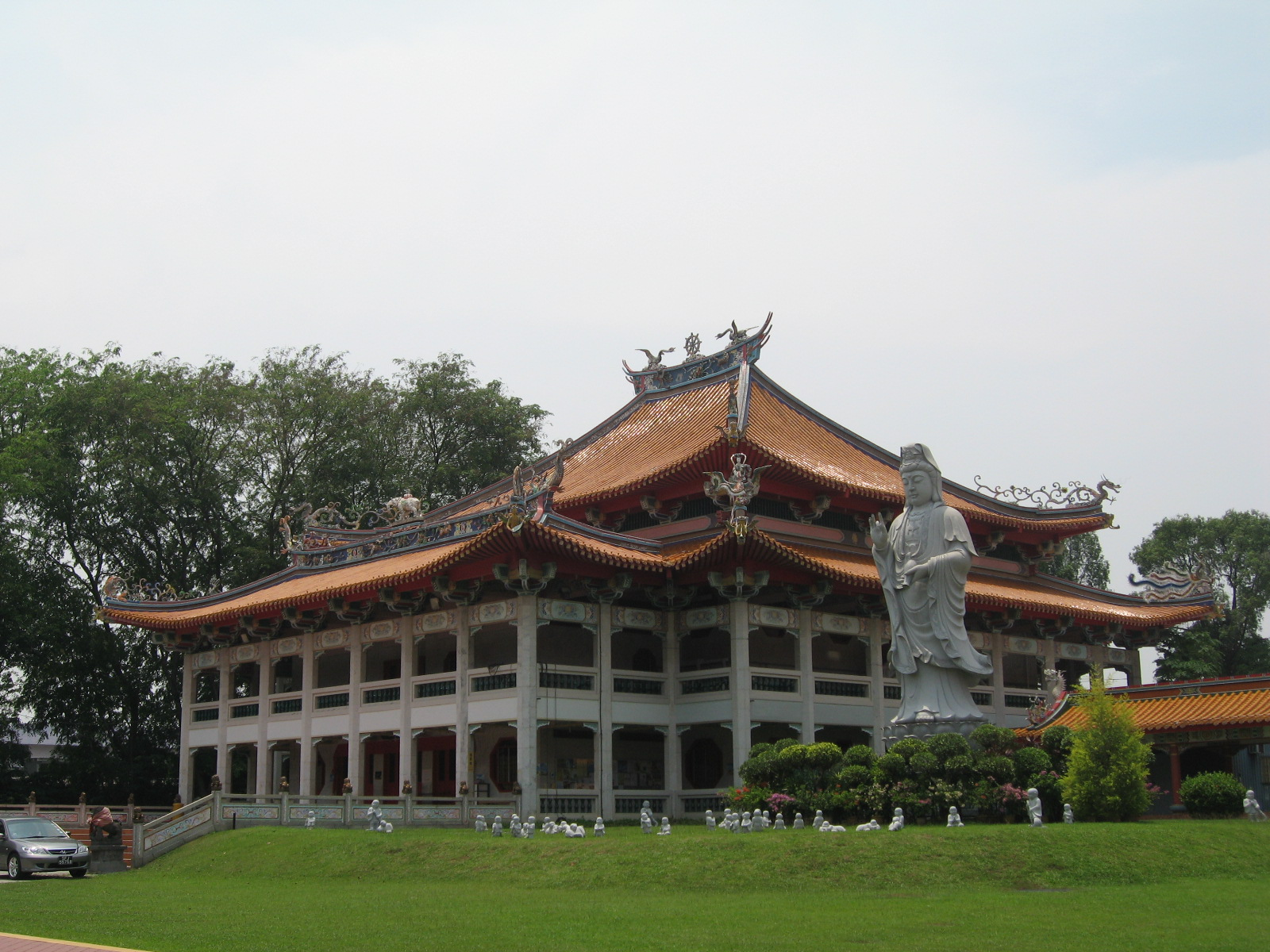
Kong Meng San Phor Kark See Monastery is the largest and a widely visited temple

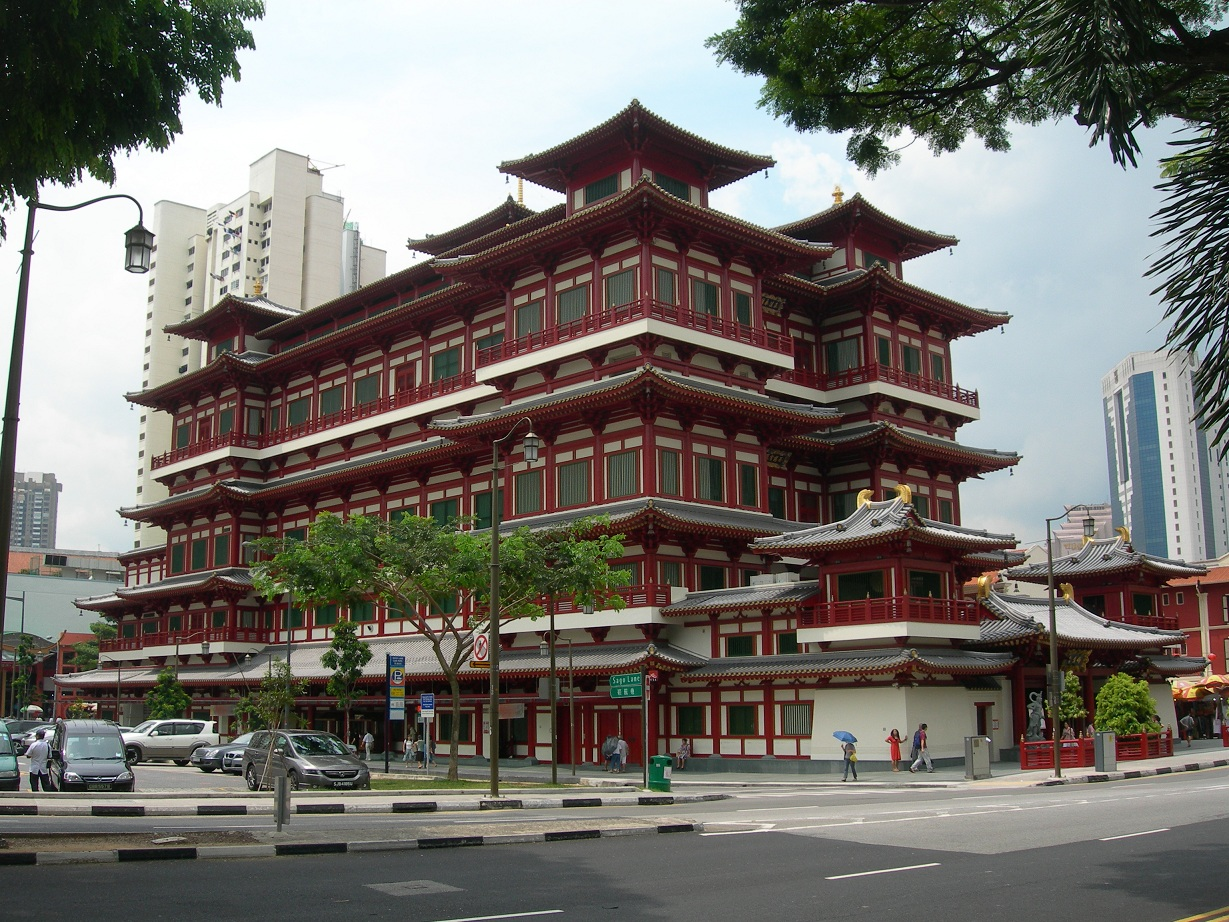
Chinese Buddha Tooth Relic Temple and Museum

Thai Sakya Muni Buddha Gaya Temple

=== Christianity ===
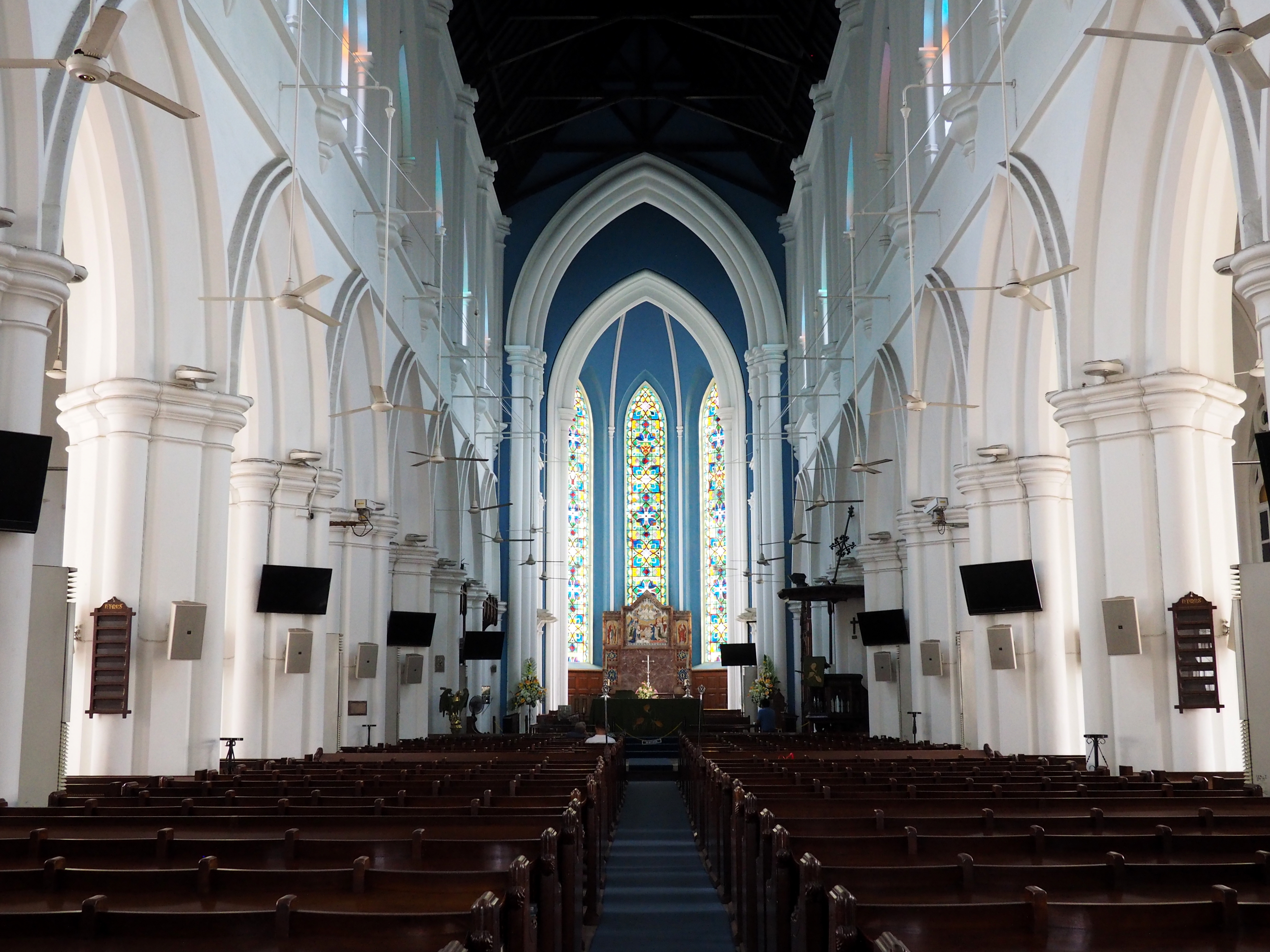
Interior of the Saint Andrew's Cathedral. It is the 1862 principal church of the Anglican Diocese of Singapore and national monument.

17.1% of Singaporeans identified as Christians in the 2025 general household survey.

Most of them identify as Protestant. Among them, the Methodist Church in Singapore is the largest denomination, with some 42,000 members in 46 churches. Prominent megachurches have emerged over the last two decades with the rise of the charismatic movement; these include New Creation Church, City Harvest Church and Faith Community Baptist Church, which count among Singapore's 10 largest charities, according to a report by The Straits Times in 2019.

35.8% or 220,900 people identified as members of Catholic Church in Singapore.

Some identifying as Eastern Orthodox (Eastern Orthodox Metropolitanate of Singapore and South Asia), Oriental Orthodox or other minority Christian denominations.

Below are the ethnic breakdown of Christians according to the 2020 Singapore Census of Population as follows:

Ethnic Group	Total Resident Population of Ethnic Group	Population of Resident Ethnic Group registered as Christians	Percentage of Resident Ethnic Group registered as Christians	Percentage of Christian Residents by Ethnic Group
Chinese	2,606,881	562,861	21.59%	86.02%
Malays	447,747	2,743	0.61%	0.42%
Indians	299,056	37,605	12.57%	5.75%
Others	105,410	51,146	48.52%	7.82%
Overall	3,459,093	654,355	18.90%	100%

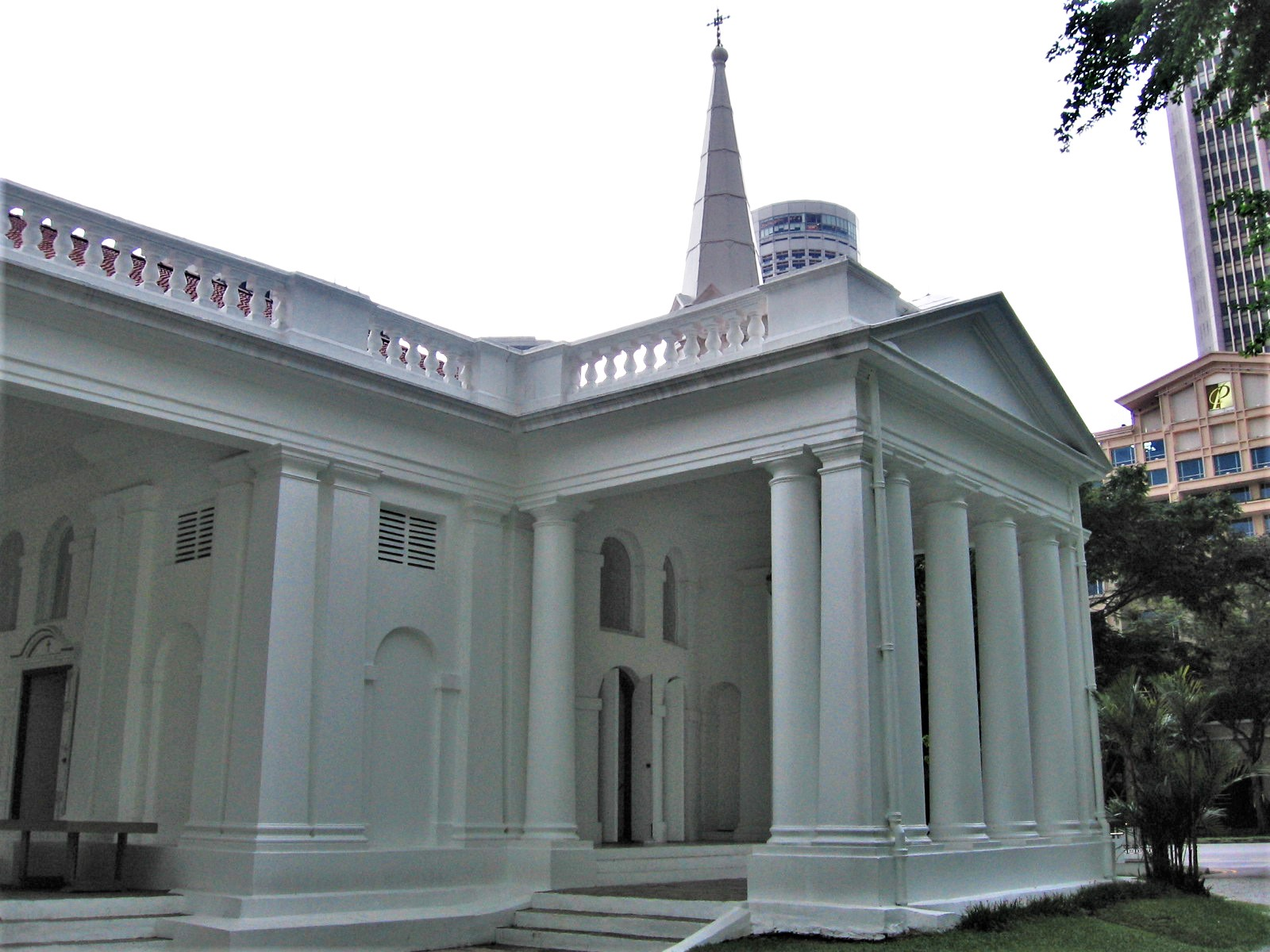
Armenian Church (built 1835) is the oldest church in Singapore

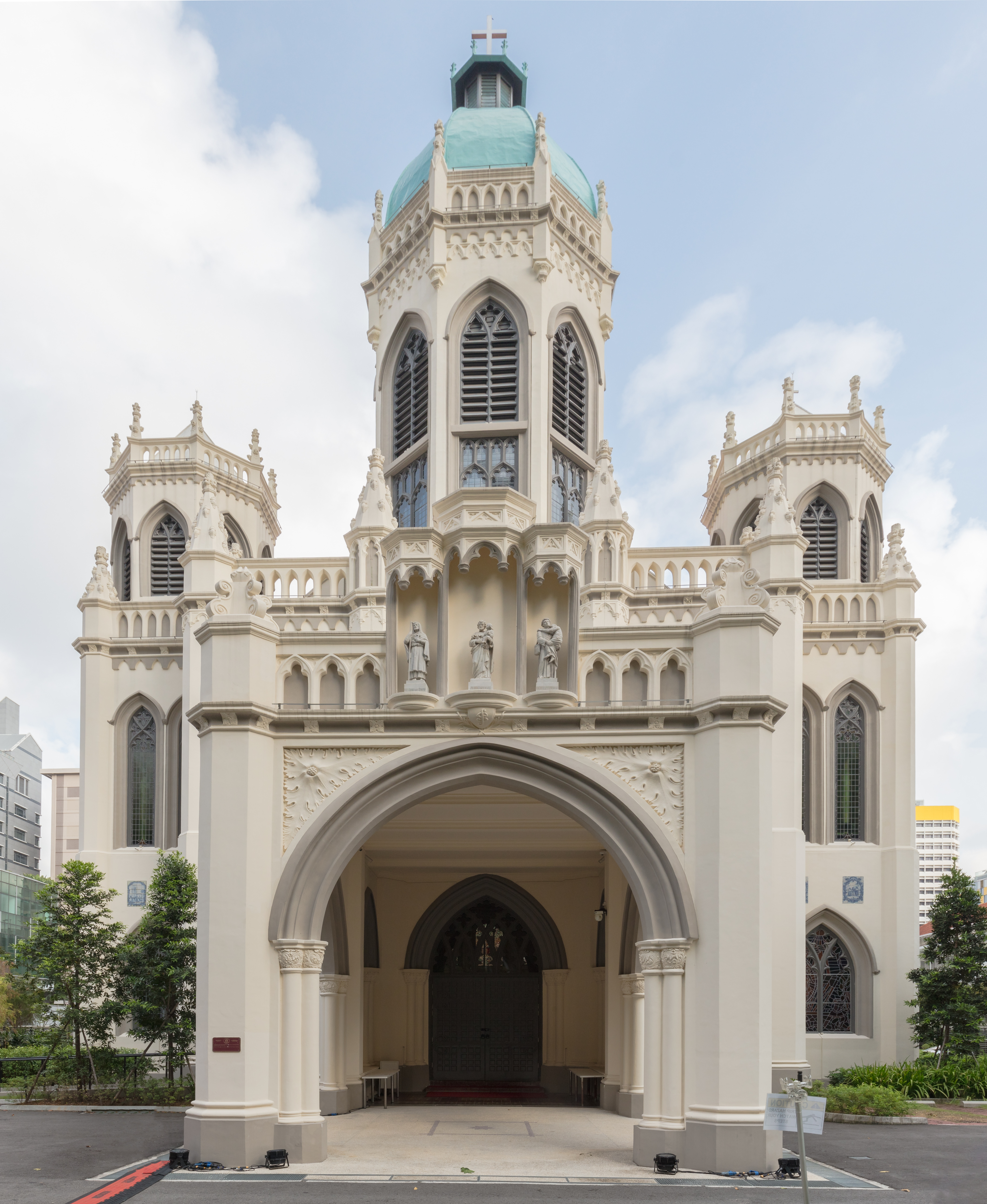
Catholic St. Joseph's Church

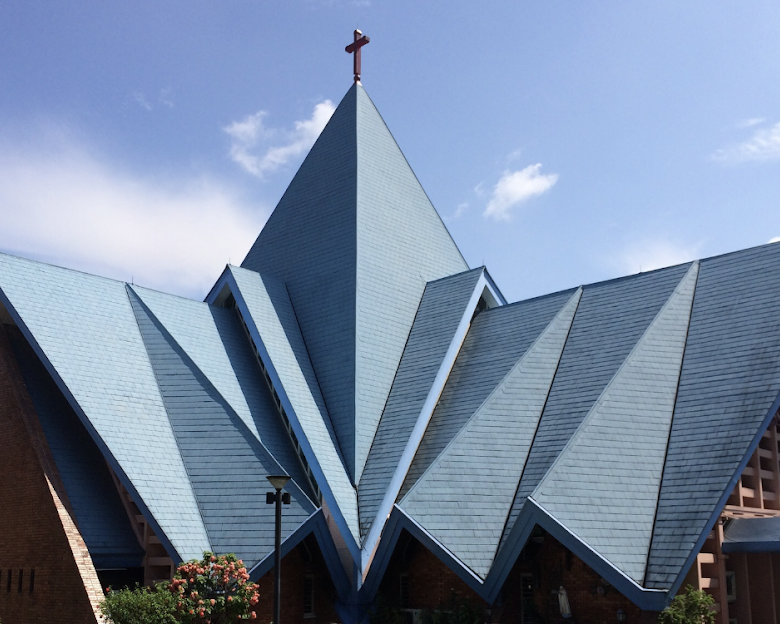
Catholic Church of the Blessed Sacrament

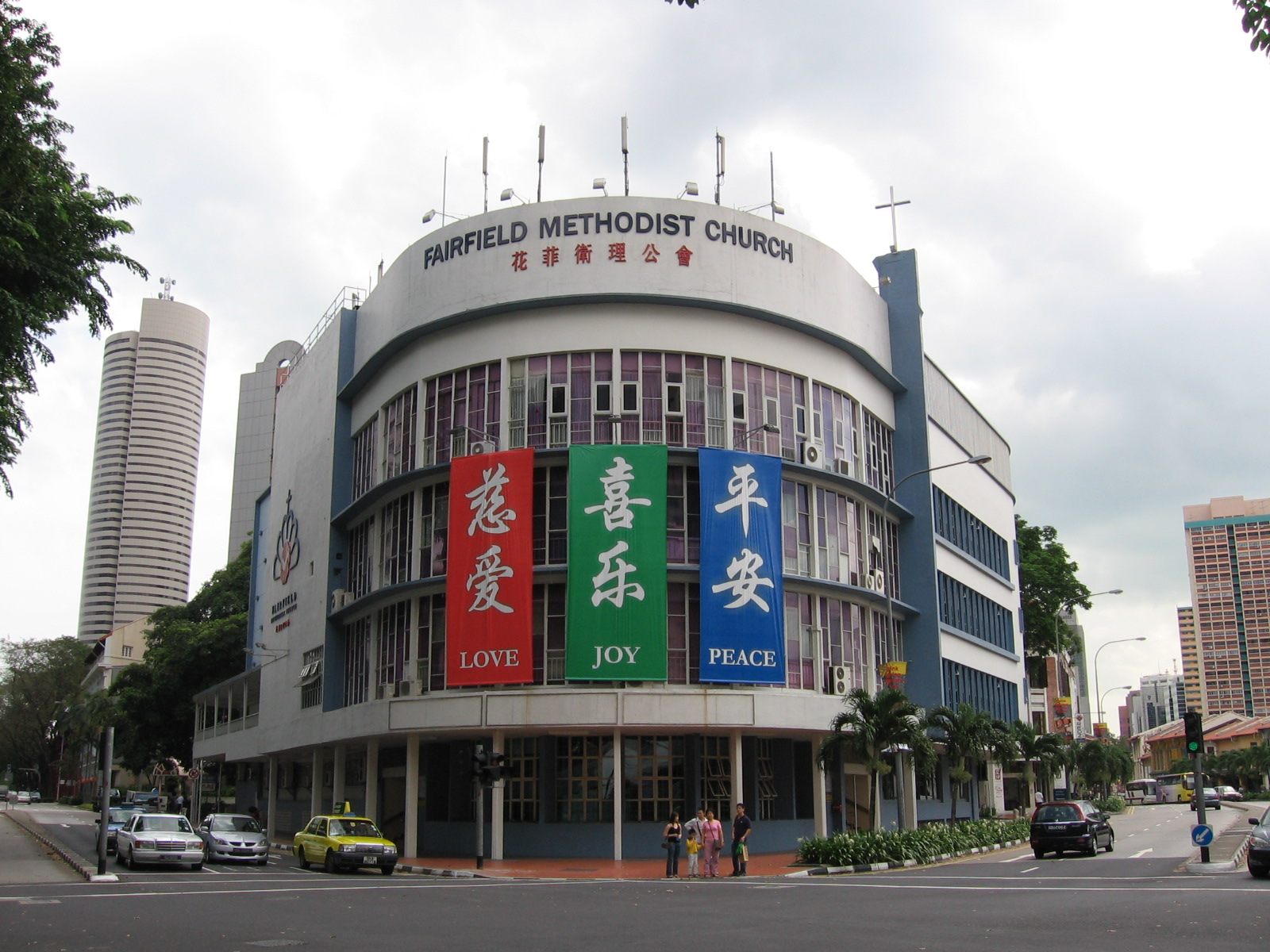
Fairfield Methodist Church, formerly the Metropole Theatre

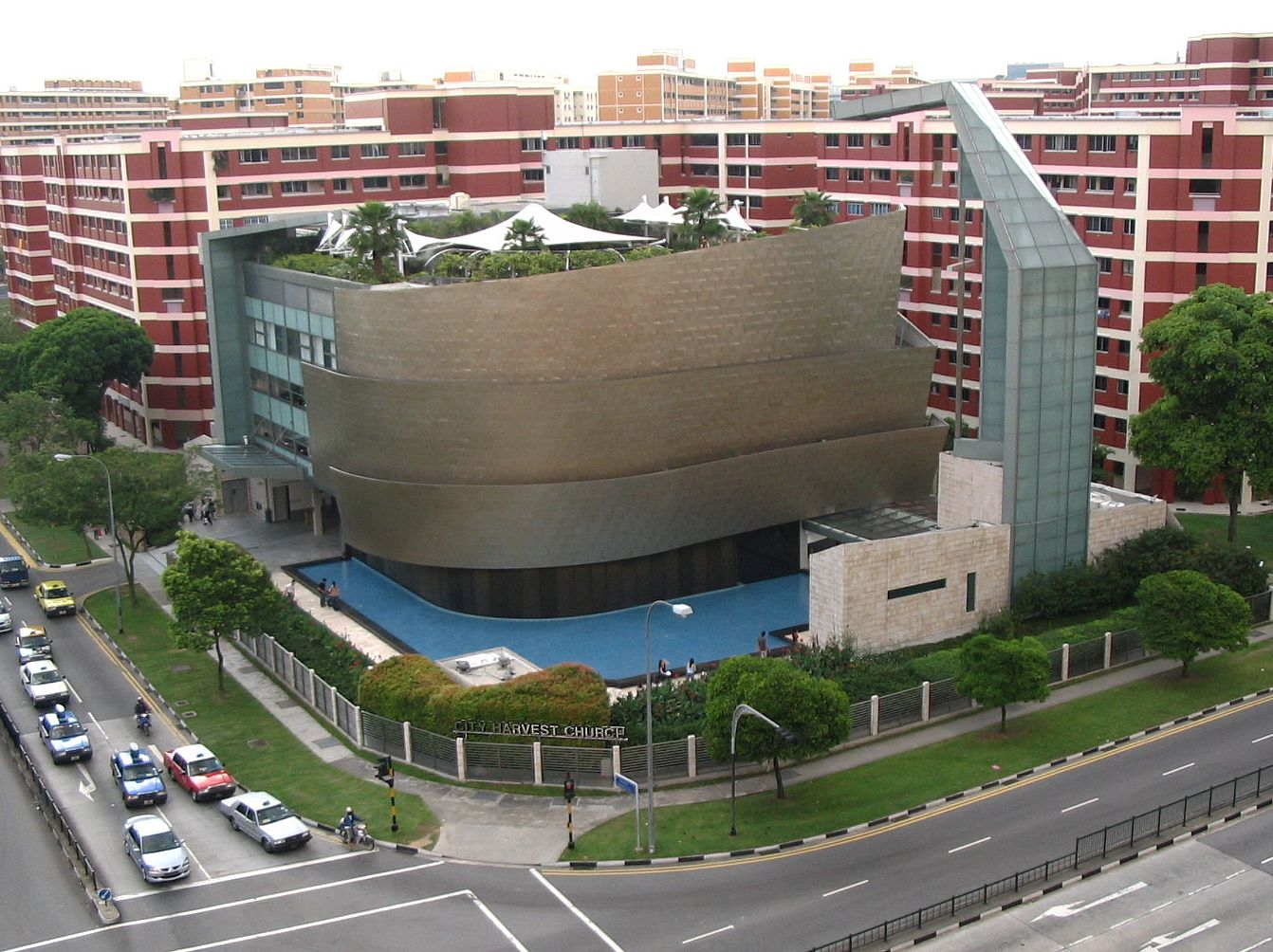
Pentecostal City Harvest Megachurch

=== Islam ===
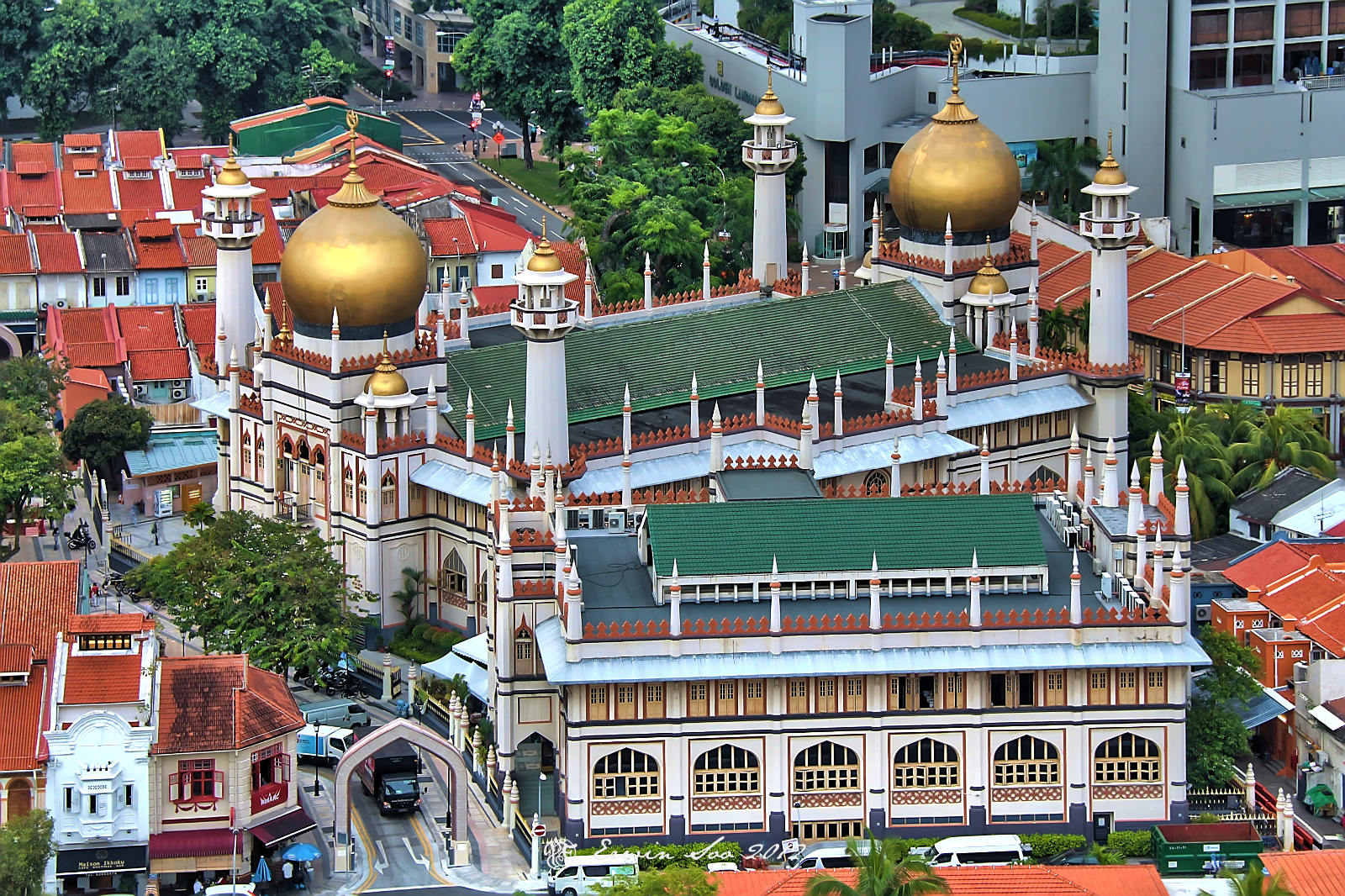
An aerial view of the Sultan Mosque, built in 1826 in the Kampong Glam district, is the oldest and one of the largest mosques in Singapore, a national monument.

According to the 2020 census, 15.6% of the resident population declared themselves Muslims. Most mosques in Singapore cater to Sunni Muslims due to the vast majority of Singaporean Muslims adhering to the Sunni Shafi'i or Hanafi school of thought, Sunni Salafi movement is also introduced, although there are mosques that cater to the needs of the Shia community as well. There are approximately 200 Ahmadi. Singapore also contains the oldest Muslim women's organisation in the world: Young Women Muslim Association of Singapore.

Whilst a majority of Muslims in Singapore are traditionally ethnic native Malays, there is also a significantly growing number of Muslims from other ethnic groups. There is a sizeable number of Muslims amongst ethnic Indians that include Tamil Muslims and ethnic Pakistanis as well. For this reason, a number of mosques (mostly Tamil-speaking) specifically cater to the needs of the Indian Muslim community. Among other notable ethnic groups with Muslim majority are Bugis and Javanese people. Numbers of Chinese converted to Islam remain small. Additionally, under the direction of the Islamic Religious Council of Singapore (MUIS), English is increasingly being used as the language of administration, religious instruction and sermons for Friday prayers in mosques across Singapore to cater to Muslims who may not necessarily be Malay-speaking.

Below is the ethnic breakdown of Muslims according to the 2020 Singapore Census of Population as follows:

Ethnic Group	Total Resident Population of Ethnic Group	Population of Resident Ethnic Group registered as Muslims	Percentage of Resident Ethnic Group registered as Muslims	Percentage of Muslim Residents by Ethnic Group
Chinese	2,606,881	11,953	0.46%	2.22%
Malays	447,747	442,368	98.80%	82.03%
Indians	299,056	69,964	23.39%	12.97%
Others	105,410	14,966	14.20%	2.78%
Overall	3,459,093	539,251	15.59%	100%

Masjid Abdul Gaffoor

Masjid Malabar

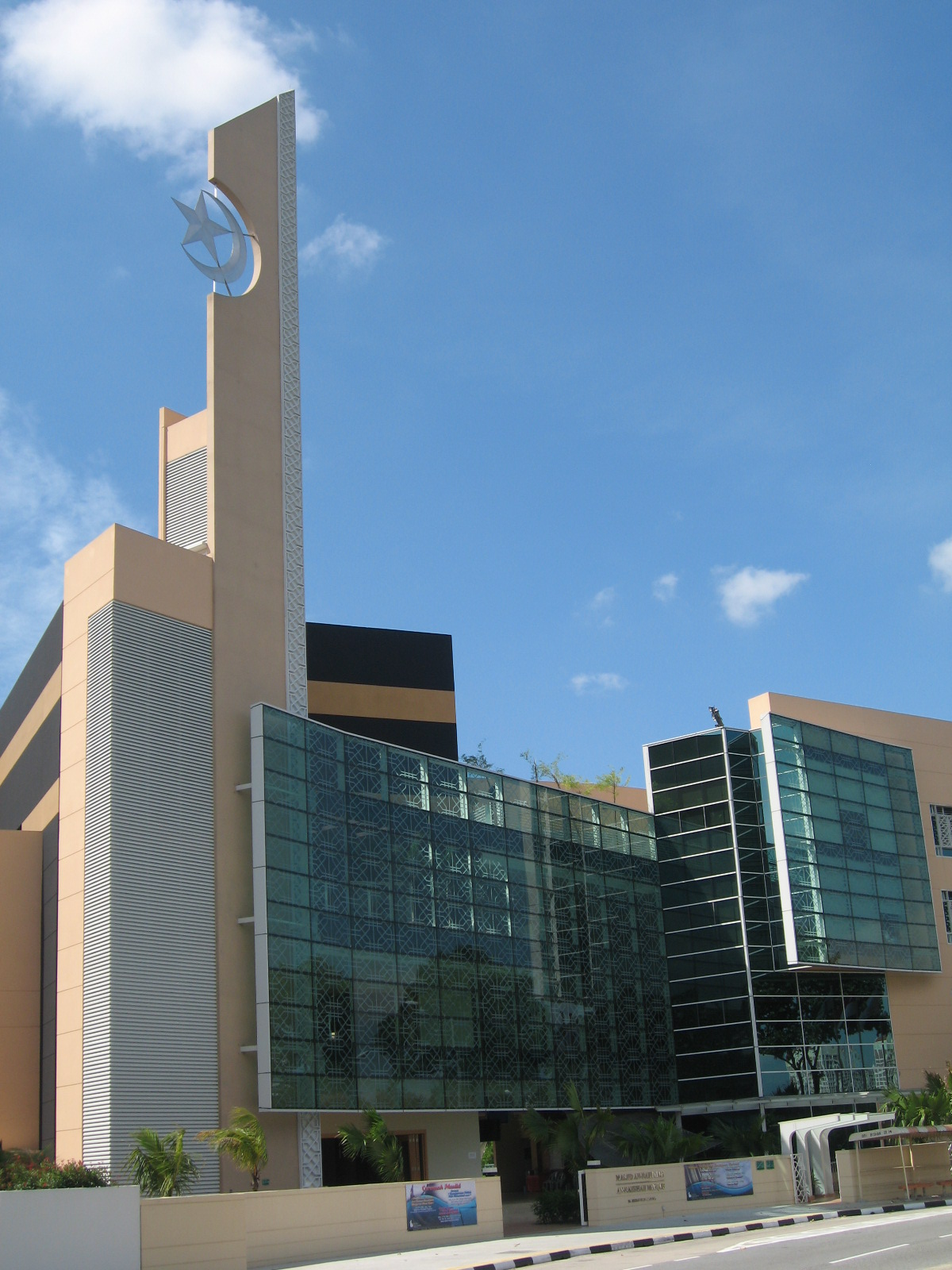
Masjid An-Nahdhah complex

=== Taoism ===
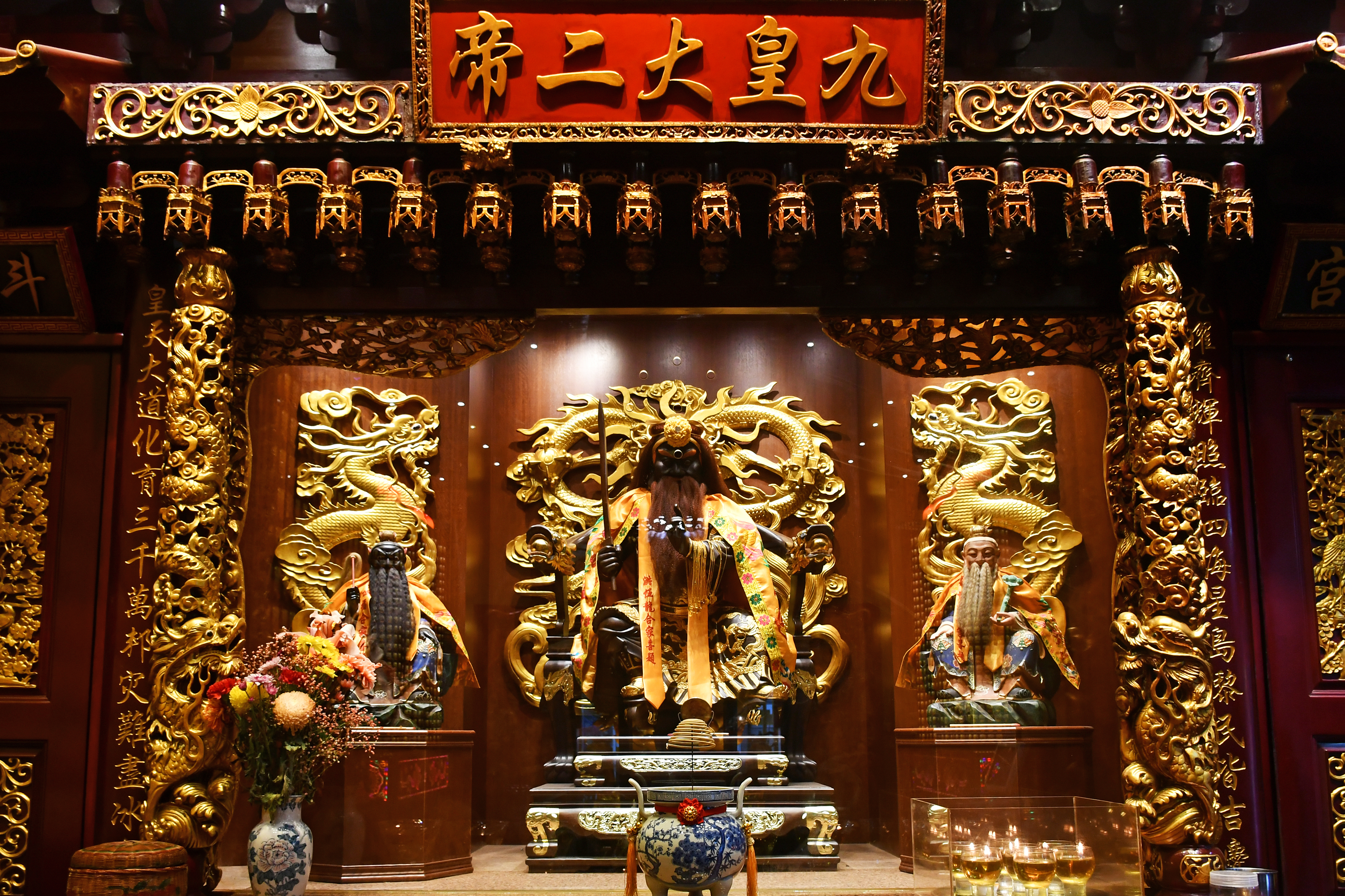
Altar of the Second Emperor of the Nine Emperor Gods at the Leong Nam Temple.

According to the 2020 Census, 8.8% of Singaporeans declared themselves as Taoist.

Followers of Taoism ("The Way") adhere to the teachings of the ancient Chinese religious philosophy of Laozi, the founder of Taoism, also known as the Pure Celestial Worthy of the Way. Besides codified Taoism—which in some places, like Taiwan, is mostly represented by the Zhengyi order—Taoism in Singapore also includes a wide variety of Chinese folk religious traditions and various other religions.

Ancestral worship is a common practice of the Chinese and the Qingming Festival during the second full moon is observed by the majority. This reflects that Chinese tradition remains extant in modern Singapore. They pray in tribute to their bereaved ancestors, where their spirits are honoured with offerings including food, beverages, joss paper, incense sticks, and even paper houses, which are intrinsic practices for Taoists.

Although Taoist temples and shrines are abundant in Singapore, the official number of followers has dwindled drastically over the years from 22.4% to 8.5% between the years 1990 to 2000. This, however, may be accounted for by the unclear delineation between Taoism and Buddhism in popular perception. For example, the difference between the two religions can be negligible enough that when a Chinese says that they "offer incense sticks" it is usually assumed that they are Buddhist even though they may not actually be Buddhist. The 2010 and 2015 censuses have shown that Taoist identity has declined again to represent about 10% of Singapore's population.

Below are the ethnic breakdown of Taoists according to the 2020 Singapore Census of Population as follows:

Ethnic Group	Total Resident Population of Ethnic Group	Population of Resident Ethnic Group registered as Taoists	Percentage of Resident Ethnic Group registered as Taoists	Percentage of Taoist Residents by Ethnic Group
Chinese	2,606,881	303,095	11.63%	99.72%
Malays	447,747	133	0.03%	0.04%
Indians	299,056	63	0.02%	0.02%
Others	105,410	669	0.63%	0.22%
Overall	3,459,093	303,960	8.79%	100%

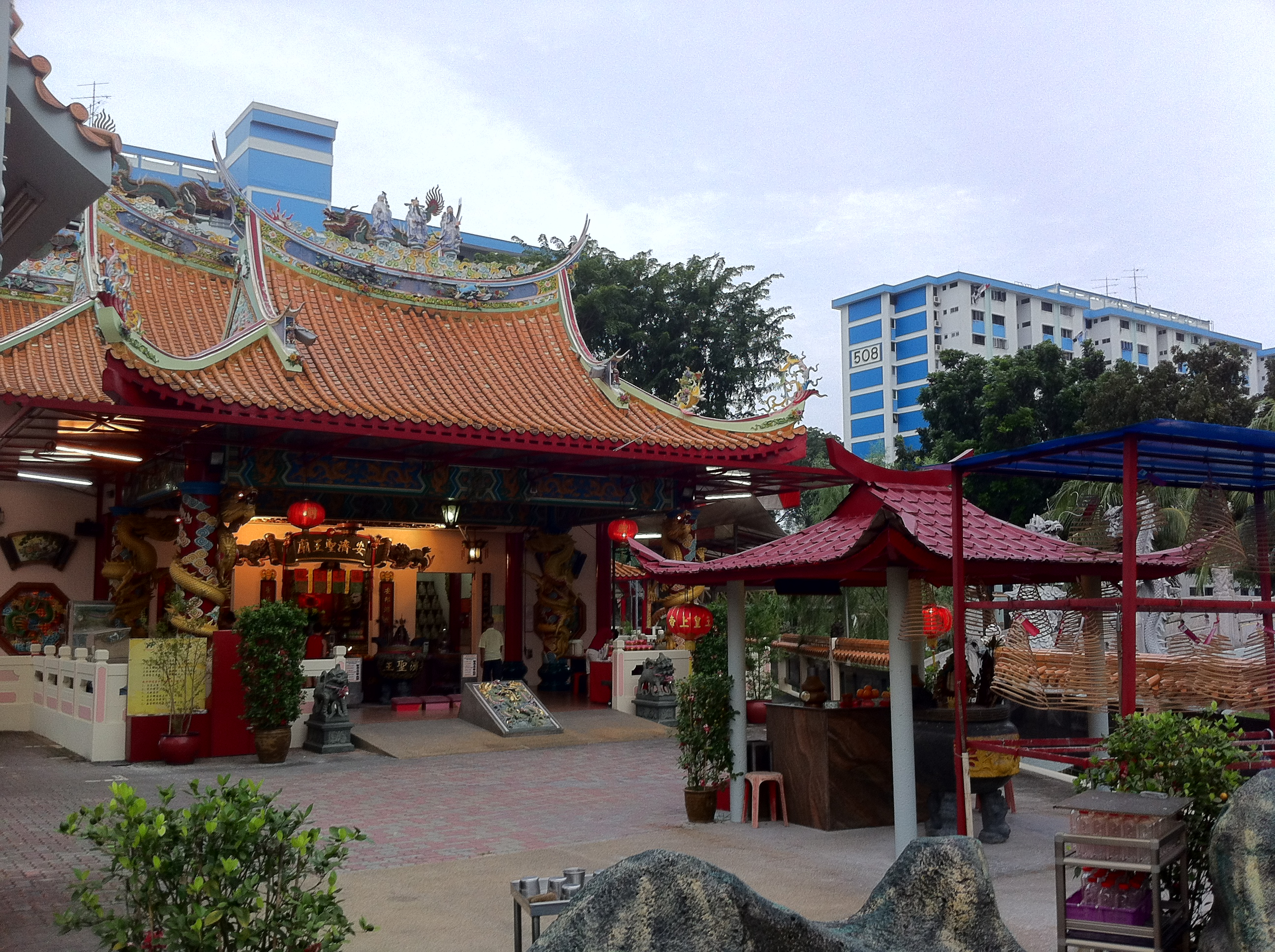
Ang Chee Sia Ong Temple

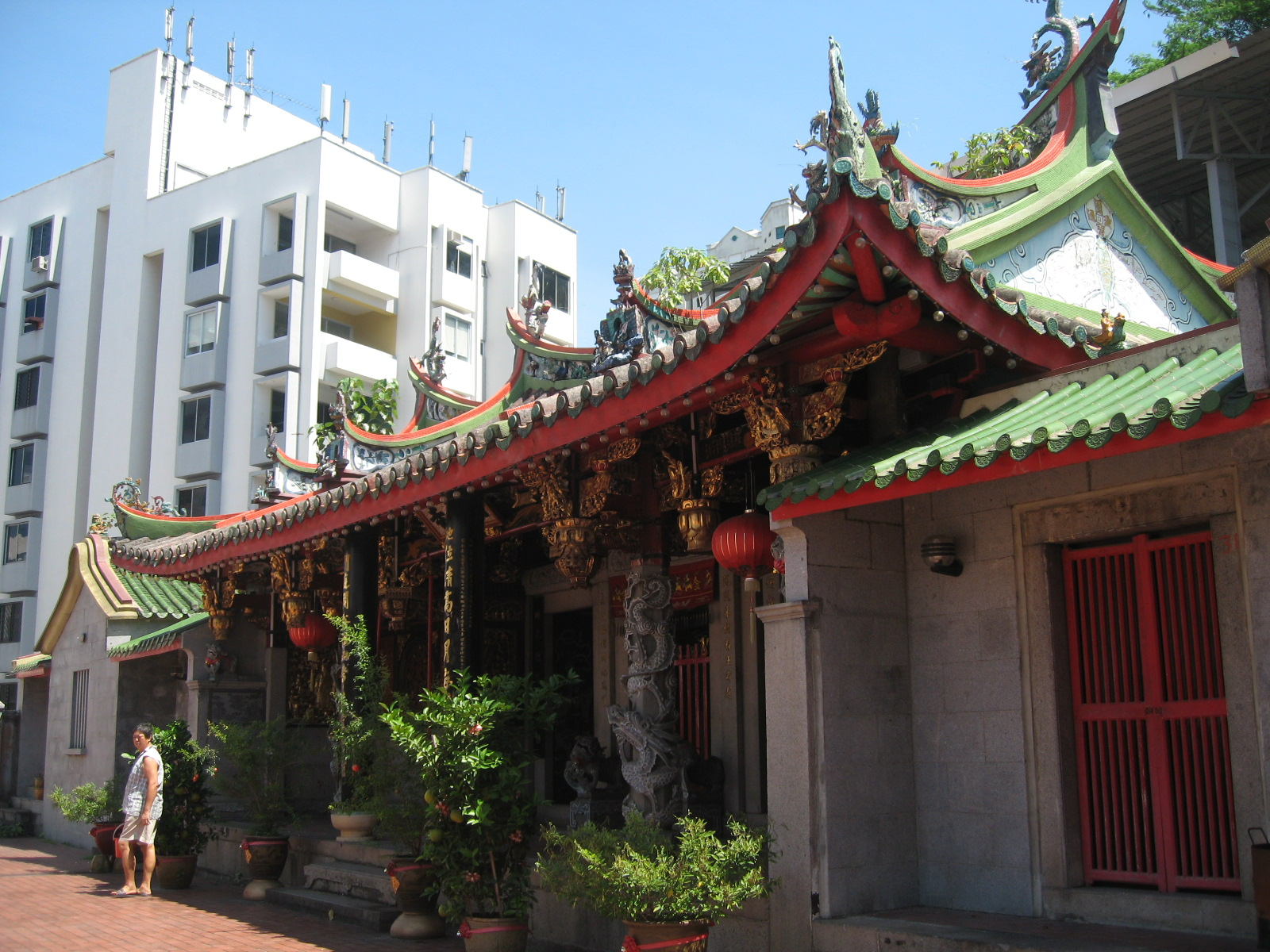
Hong San See Temple

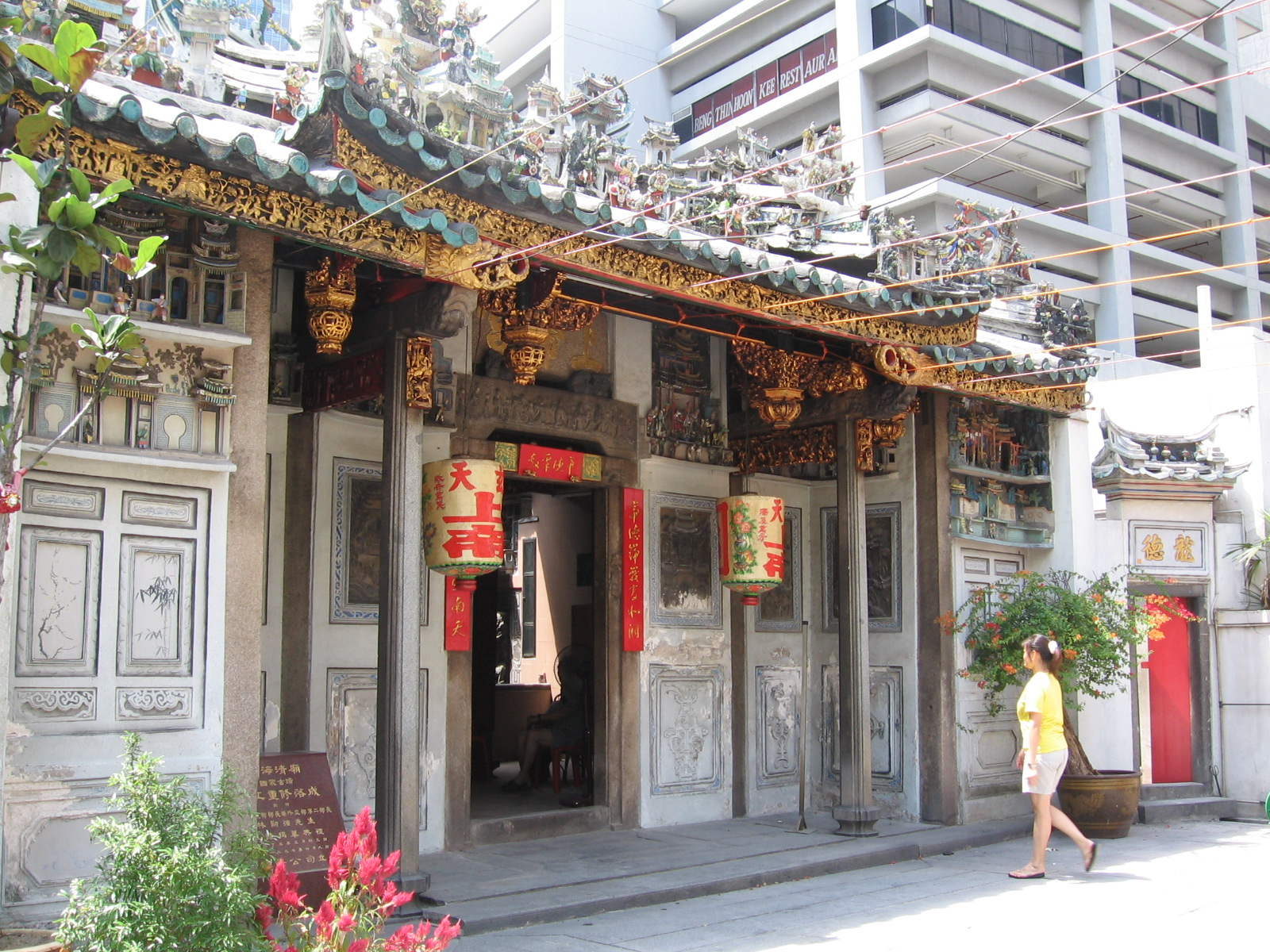
Yueh Hai Ching Temple

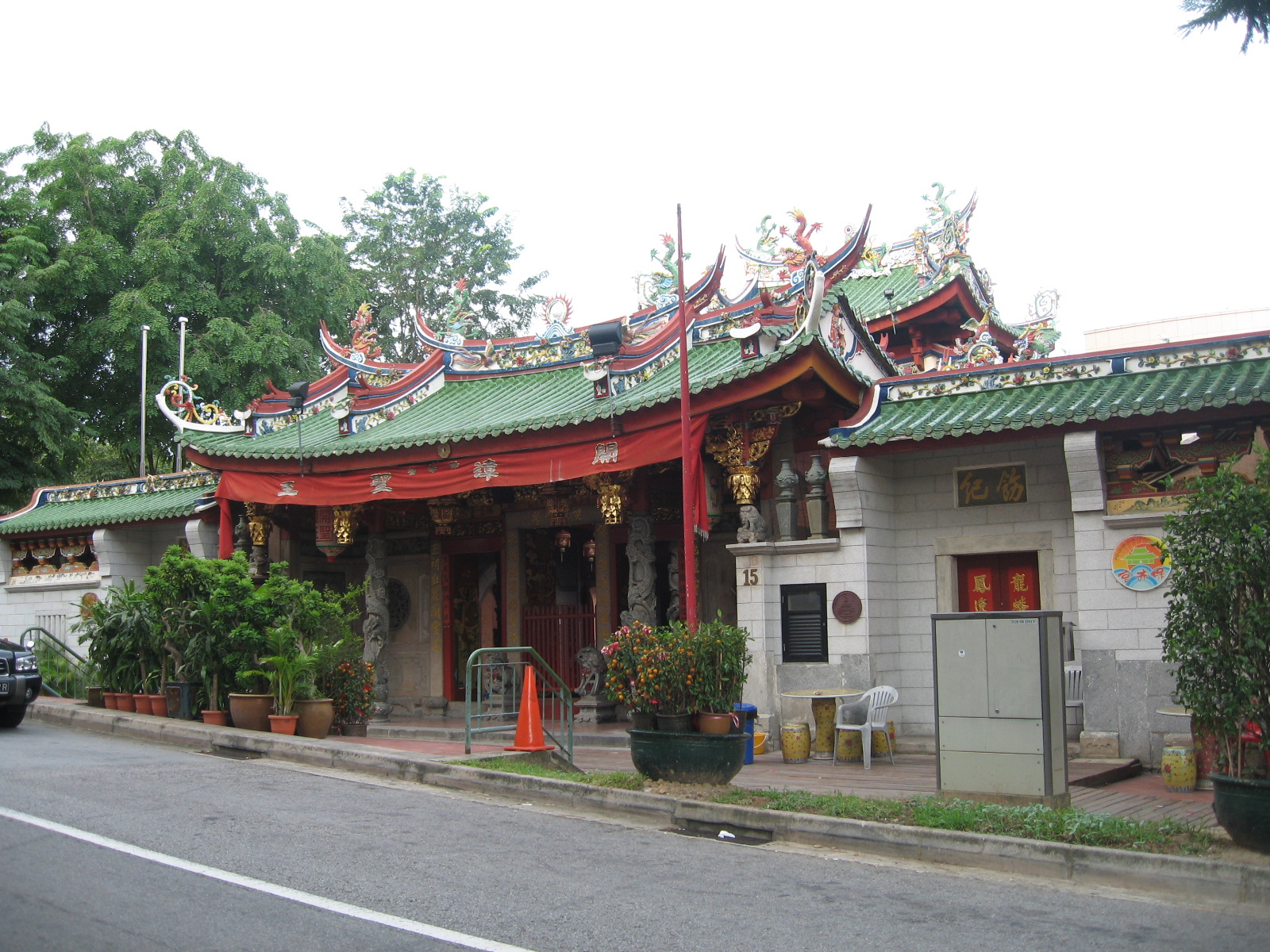
Tan Si Chong Su Temple

=== Hinduism ===
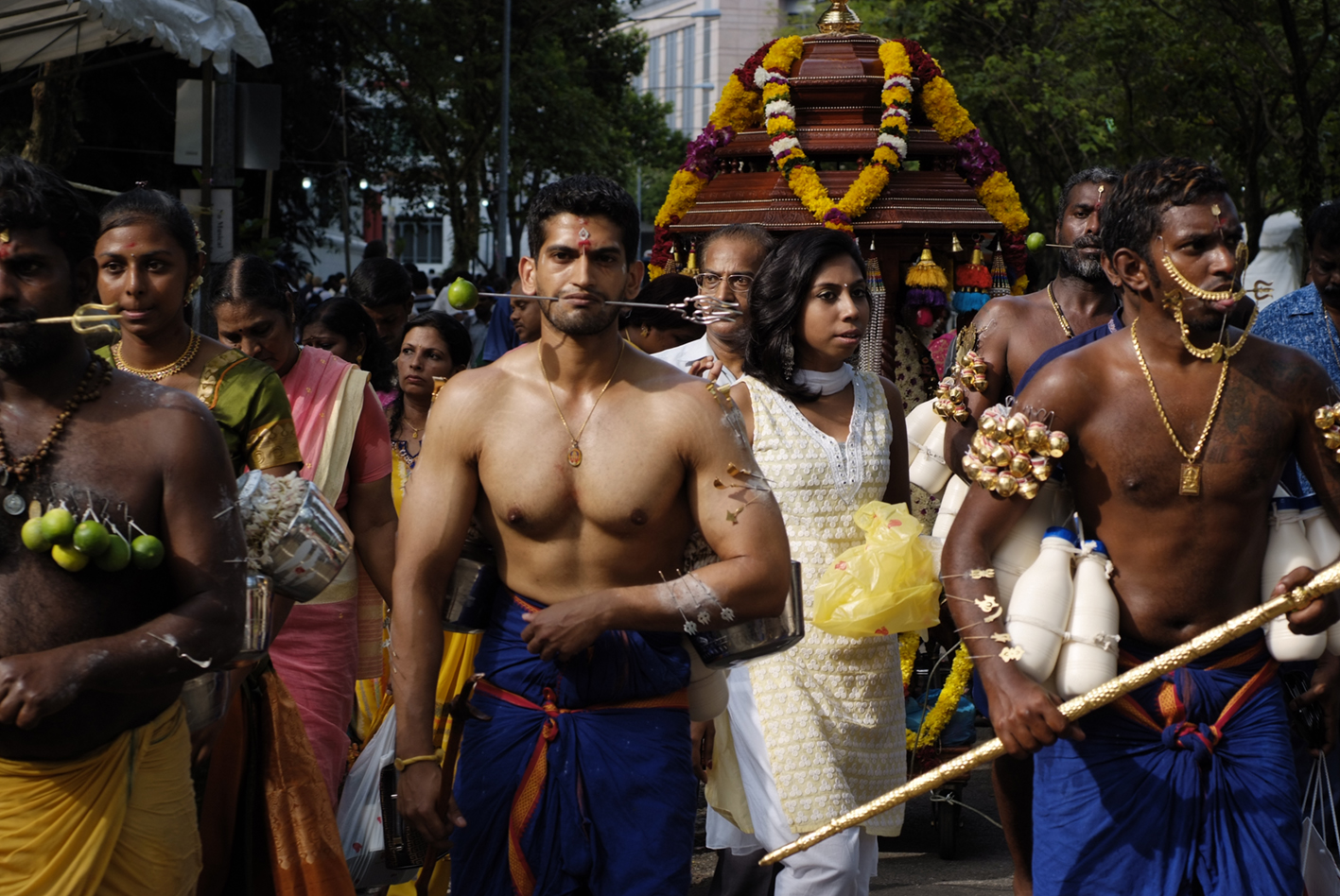
Thaipusam festival

According to the latest 2020 census, 5.0% of Singaporeans declare themselves as Hindus.

The majority of Singapore's present Hindus are descendants of Indians who migrated soon after the founding of Singapore in 1819. The early temples are still the central points of rituals and festivals, which are held throughout the year. Since the majority of Hindus hail from South India, the temples are usually dedicated to the goddess Mariamman, Shiva, Murugan, Ganesha, and Durga. At the same time, there are also temples for those from North India, such as the Sri Veeramakaliamman Temple for Kali and the Sri Lakshminarayan Temple for Lakshmi and Vishnu.

Individual temple congregations in Singapore are effectively autonomous. At the same time, there are two government agencies that oversee the affairs of Singapore’s Hindu community: the Hindu Endowments Board and the Hindu Advisory Board. Separated from the previously existing Muslim–Hindu board in 1968, the Hindu Endowments Board oversees temple operations and all temple property, and manages Hindu kindergartens, charitable activities, and major festivals.

Year	Percent	Increase
1849	2.8%	
1911	5.0%	▲ +2.2%
1921	4.6%	▼ -0.4%
1931	5.5%	▲ +0.9%
1980	3.6%	▼ -1.9%
1990	3.7%	▲ +0.1%
2000	4.0%	▲ +0.3%
2010	5.1%	▲ +1.1%
2015	4.96%	▼ -0.14%
2020	5.0%	▲ +0.04%

Below are the ethnic breakdown of Hindus according to the 2020 Singapore Census of Population as follows:

Ethnic Group	Total Resident Population of Ethnic Group	Population of Resident Ethnic Group registered as Hindus	Percentage of Resident Ethnic Group registered as Hindus	Percentage of Hindu Residents by Ethnic Group
Chinese	2,606,881	458	0.018%	0.26%
Malays	447,747	223	0.05%	0.13%
Indians	299,056	171,326	57.29%	99.05%
Others	105,410	956	0.91%	0.55%
Overall	3,459,093	172,963	5.00%	100%

1890 photo of the Kling Temple

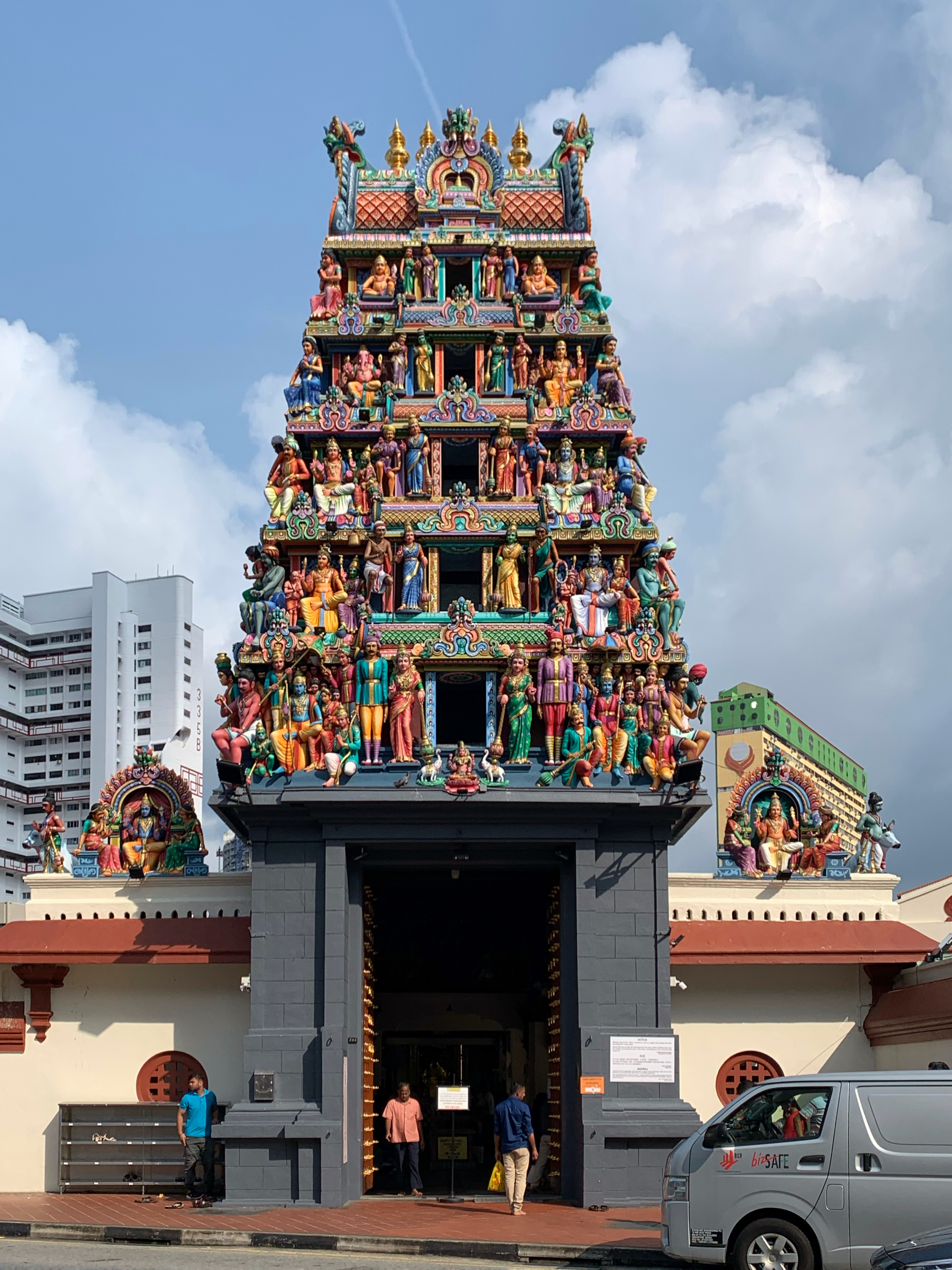
Sri Mariamman Temple (built 1827) in the Chinatown district is the oldest Hindu temple in Singapore

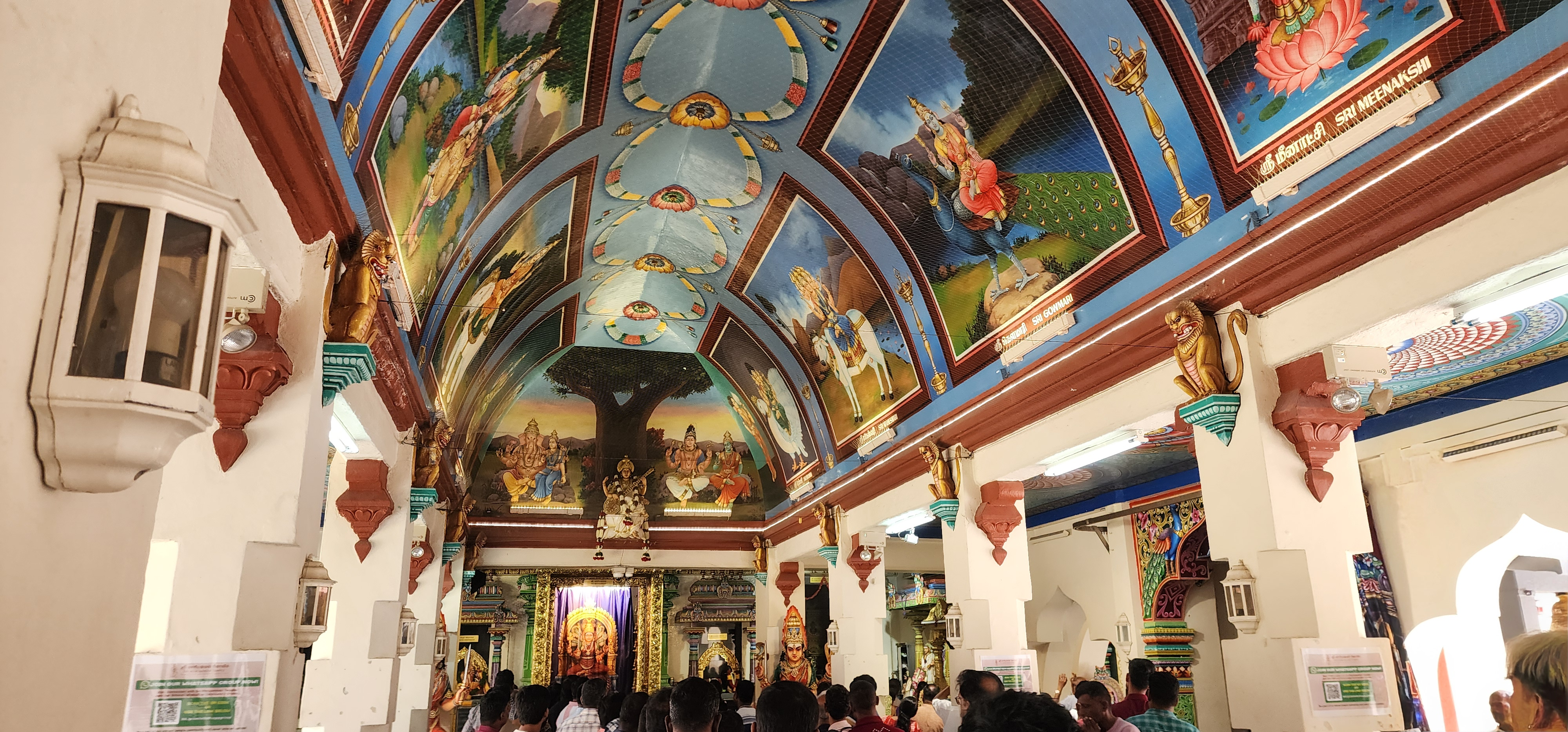
Paintings on the Sri Mariamman Temple ceiling

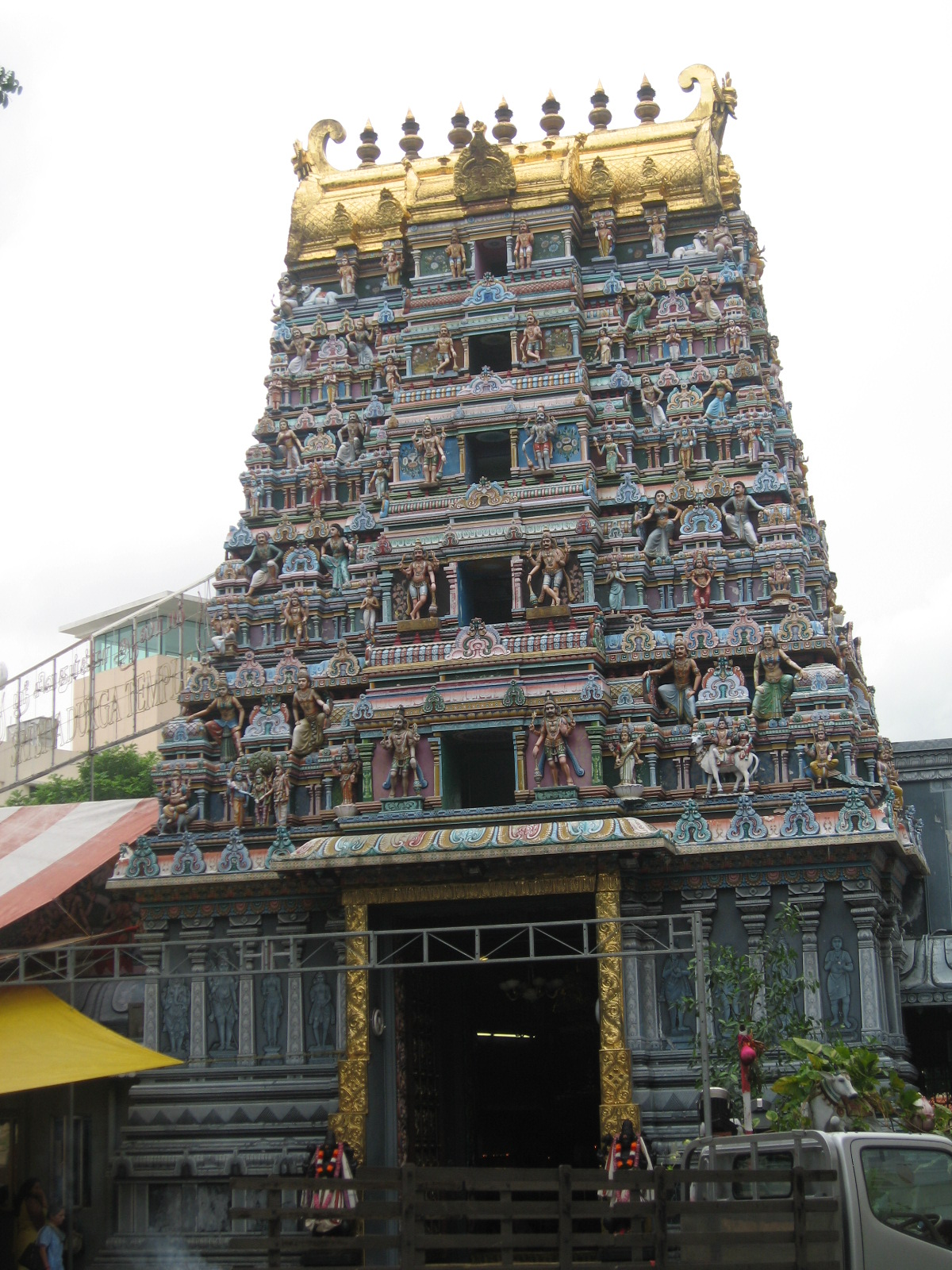
Sri Siva Durga Temple

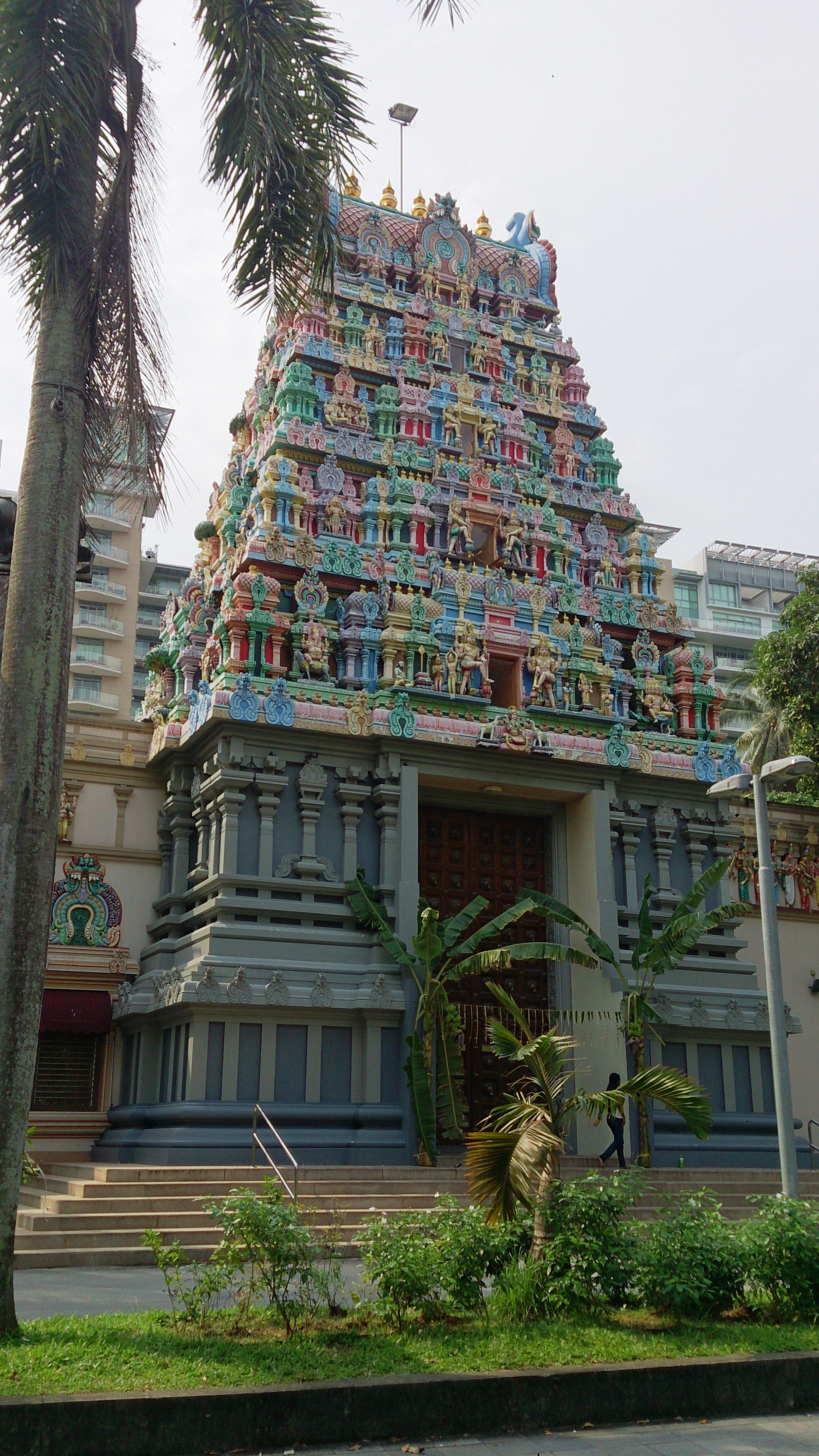
Sri Thendayuthapani Temple

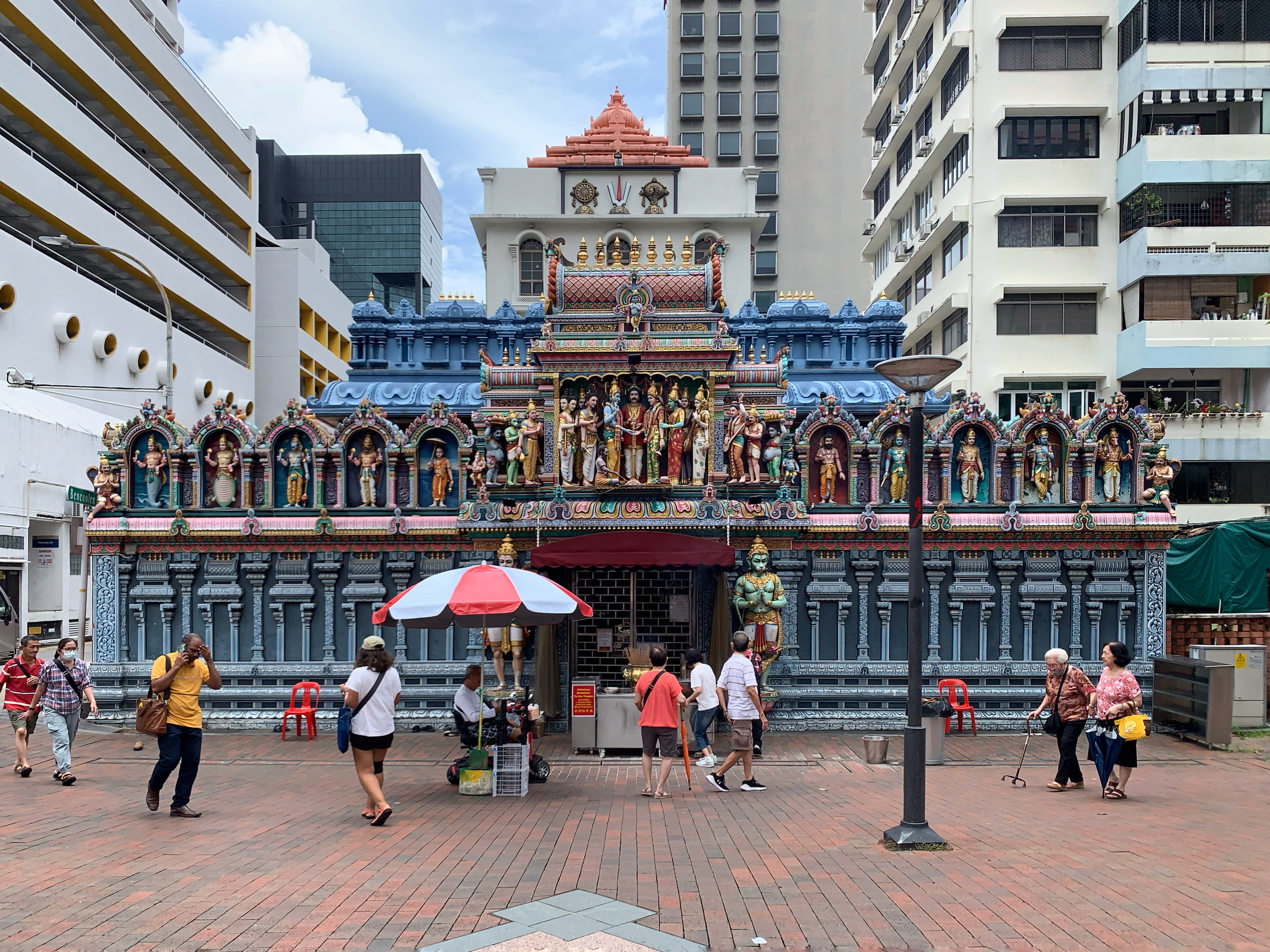
Sri Krishnan Temple

Sri Veeramakaliamman Temple mane shrine

== Small religious communities ==
=== Sikhism ===
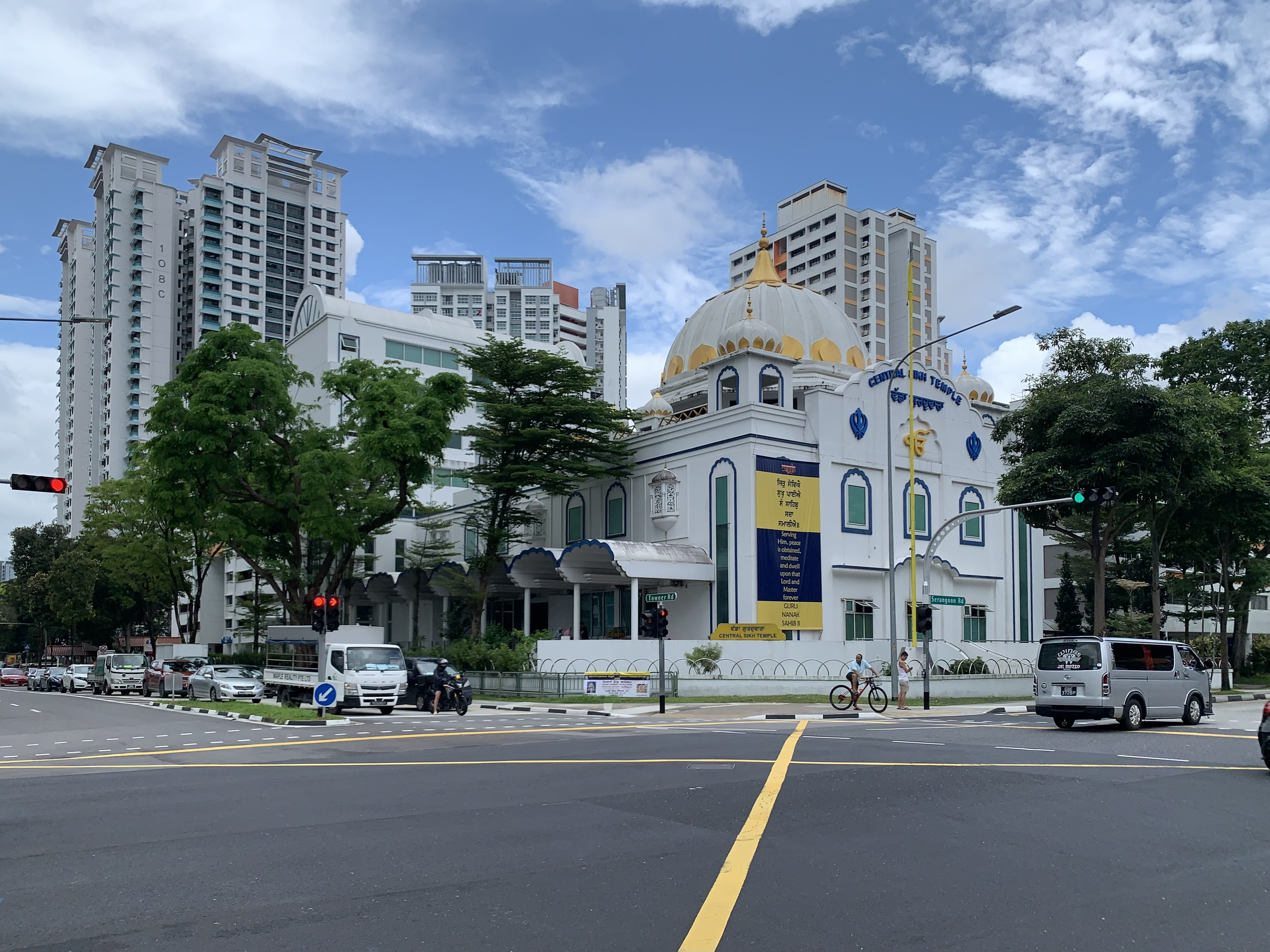
Central Sikh Temple (founded 1912) is the oldest Sikh gurdwara in Singapore.

The first Sikhs to settle in Singapore came in 1849. As of 2020 Census, there are 12,051 Sikhs (approximately 0.35% of the whole population) was registered in Singapore.

Below are the ethnic breakdown of Sikhs according to the 2020 Singapore Census of Population as follows:

Ethnic Group	Total Resident Population of Ethnic Group	Population of Resident Ethnic Group registered as Sikhs	Percentage of Resident Ethnic Group registered as Sikhs	Percentage of Sikh Residents by Ethnic Group
Chinese	2,606,881	11	0.0004%	0.09%
Malays	447,747	80	0.02%	0.66%
Indians	299,056	10,265	3.43%	85.18%
Others	105,410	1,695	1.61%	14.07%
Overall	3,459,093	12,051	0.35%	100%

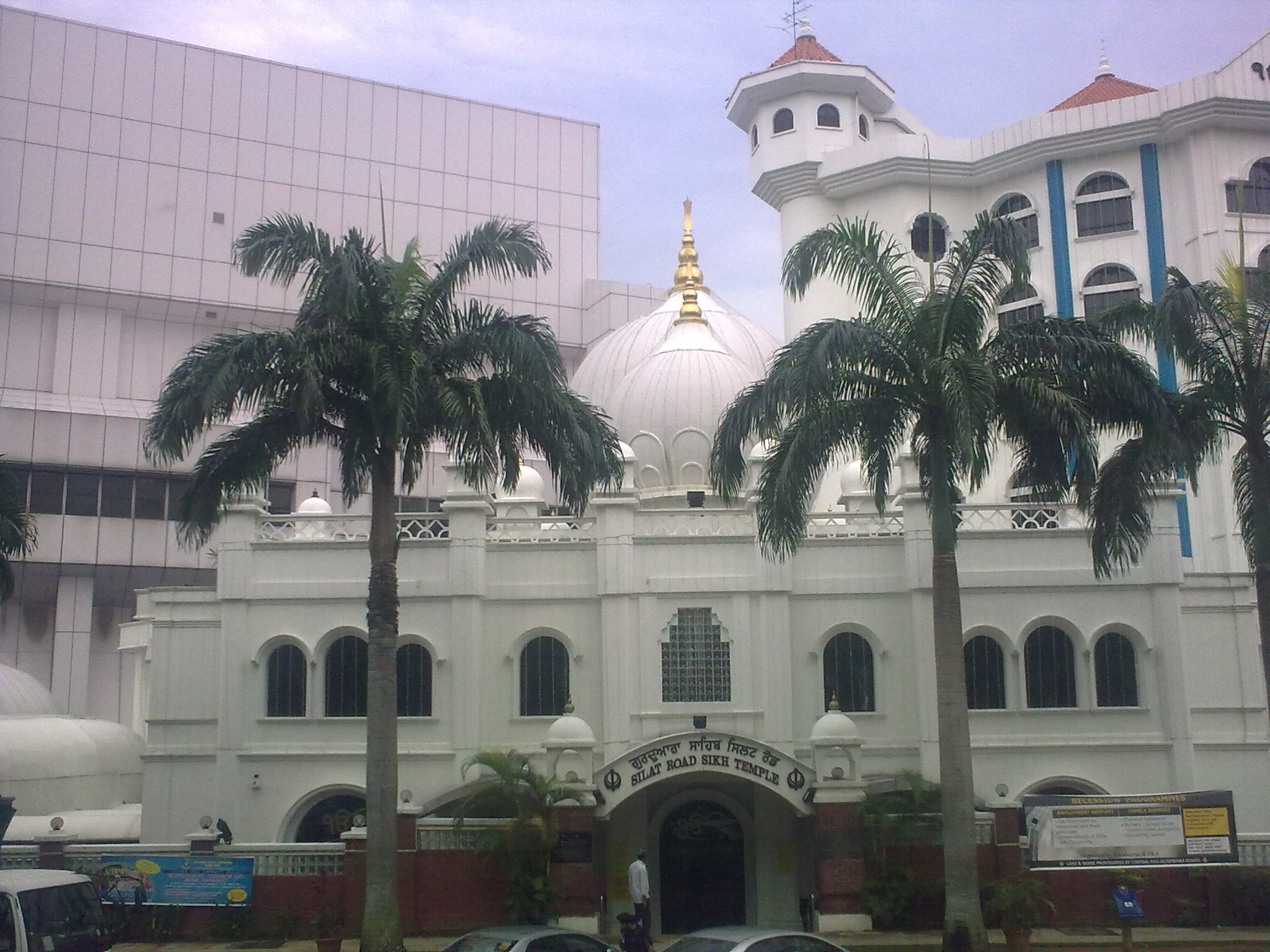
Silat Road Gurdwara (built 1924) at Jalan Bukit Merah

=== Confucianism ===
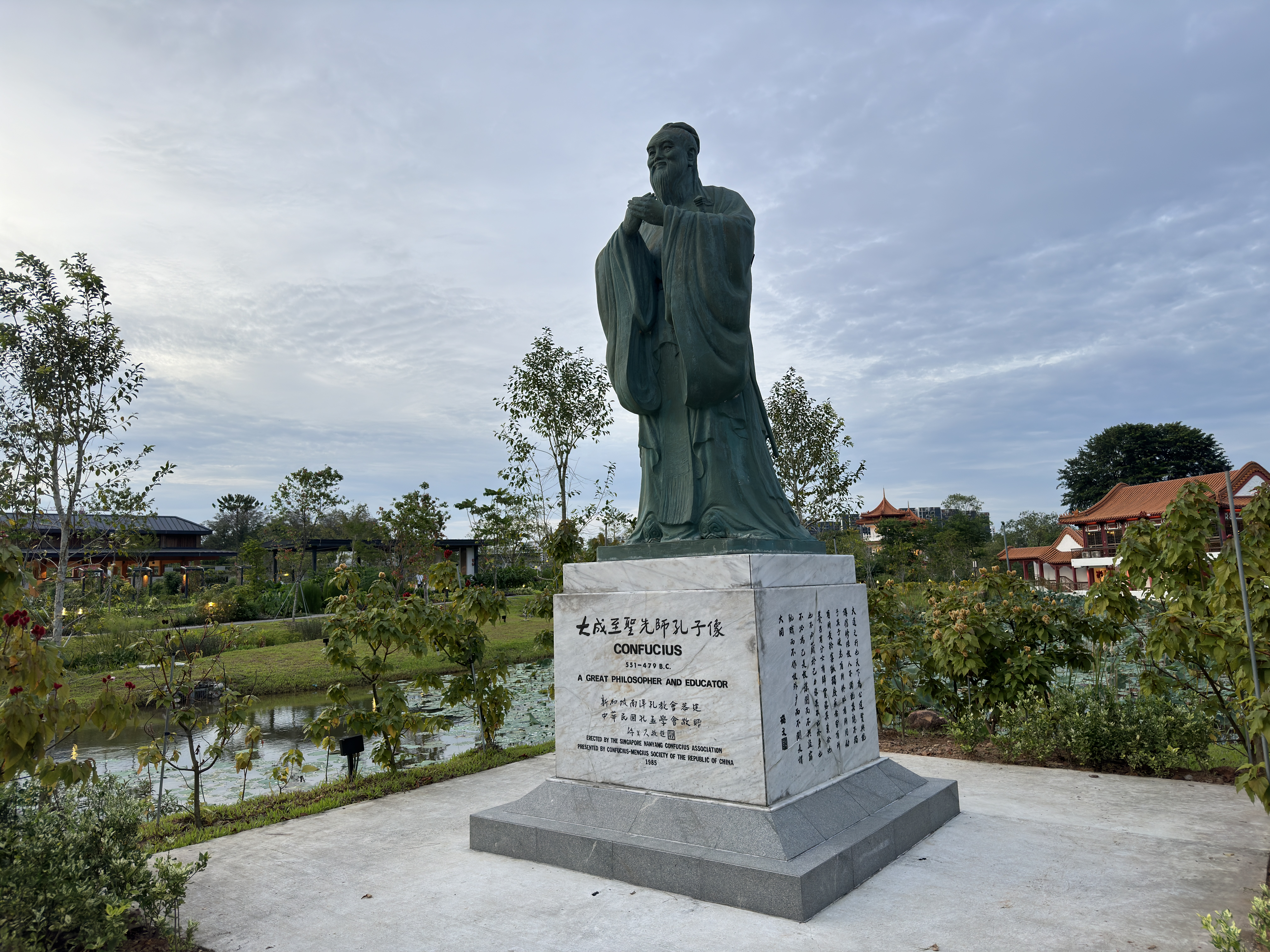
In 1985, the Confucius-Mencius Society of the Republic of China presented a standard statue of Confucius to the Nanyang Confucian Association in Singapore. It is now located in Chinese Garden.

The Religious Confucianism is introduced in Singapore within the Chinese, particularly by the Phoenix churches. Scholars note the Confucian revivalist movement that began at the turn of the 19th and 20th centuries, beginning with the establishment of Confucianism as the state religion in the Chinese Empire and spreading, among other places, to Singapore and Malaysia, and was accompanied, in particular, by the return of some Chinese Christians to Confucianism. According to various estimates, in the early 1970s, about a third of Singapore's Chinese population adhered to Confucianism.

The Singapore-based Nanyang Confucian Association does not regard itself as a religious organization, however also promotes the way of Confucius. Starting in 2004, it began planning to build a Confucian Temple (“Confucian Hall, Singapore”). Their leaders expressed opposition to the construction of a large Christian church in Confucius’ hometown of Qufu, asserting that all Chinese people should uphold Confucian cultural traditions and have the right to express opinions on Chinese cultural affairs.

The main Singaporean People's Action Party's ideology of Asian democracy drawing from Confucianism.

=== Jainism ===
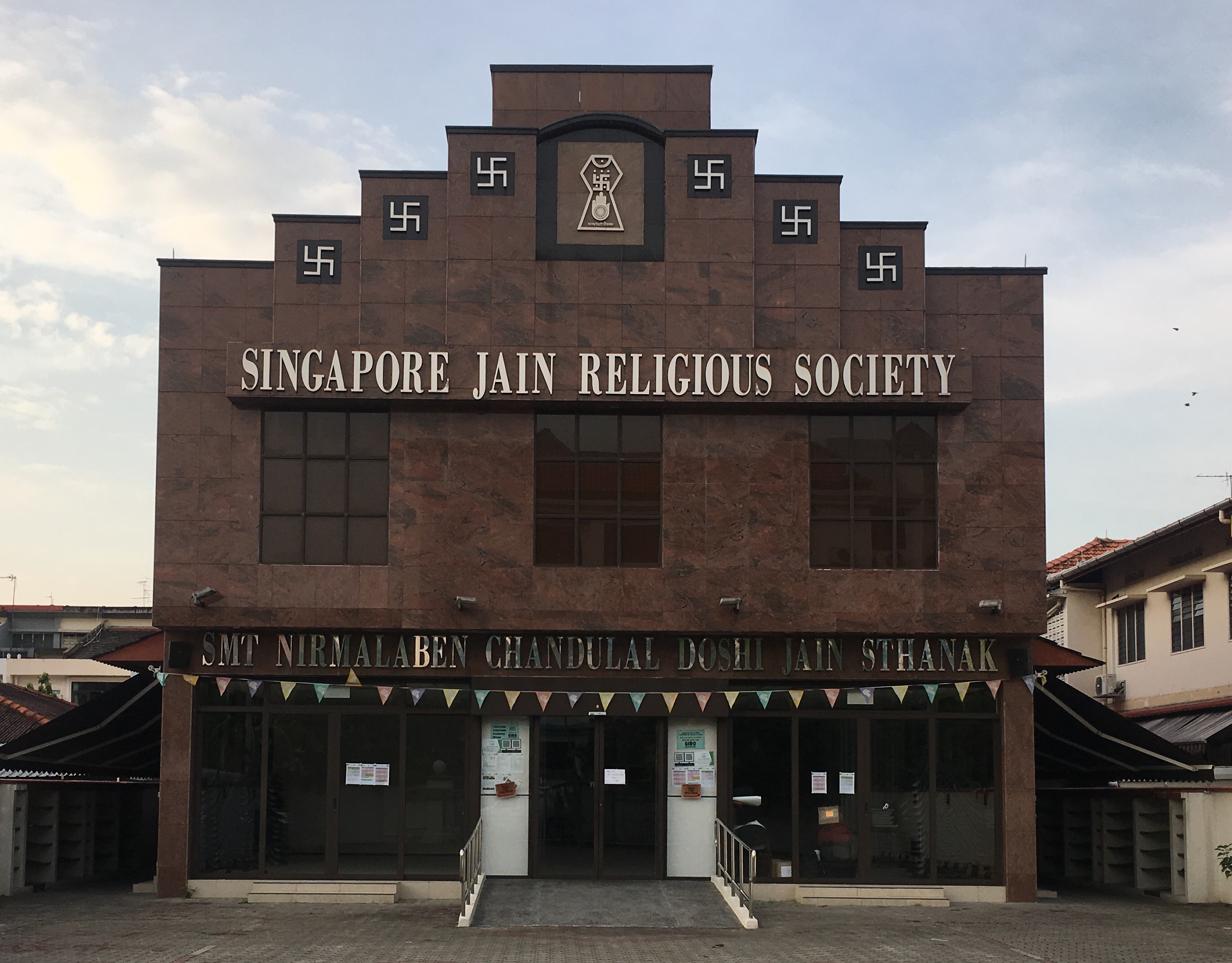
Singapore Jain Religious Society on 18 Jalan Yasin, Singapore.

The Jain community celebrated 100 years in Singapore by rededicating the "Stanak" and consecrating the idol of Mahavira. This brought together the two main sects of Jains, the Śvētāmbara and Digambara. The Singapore Jain Religious Society actively engages in keeping traditions and practices alive by transmitting Jain principles to the next generation. It also has a strong history of community involvement. The Jains have no temple, but the Singapore Jain Religious Society has a building on 18 Jalan Yasin.

As of 2006, there were 1,000 Jains in Singapore.

=== Judaism ===
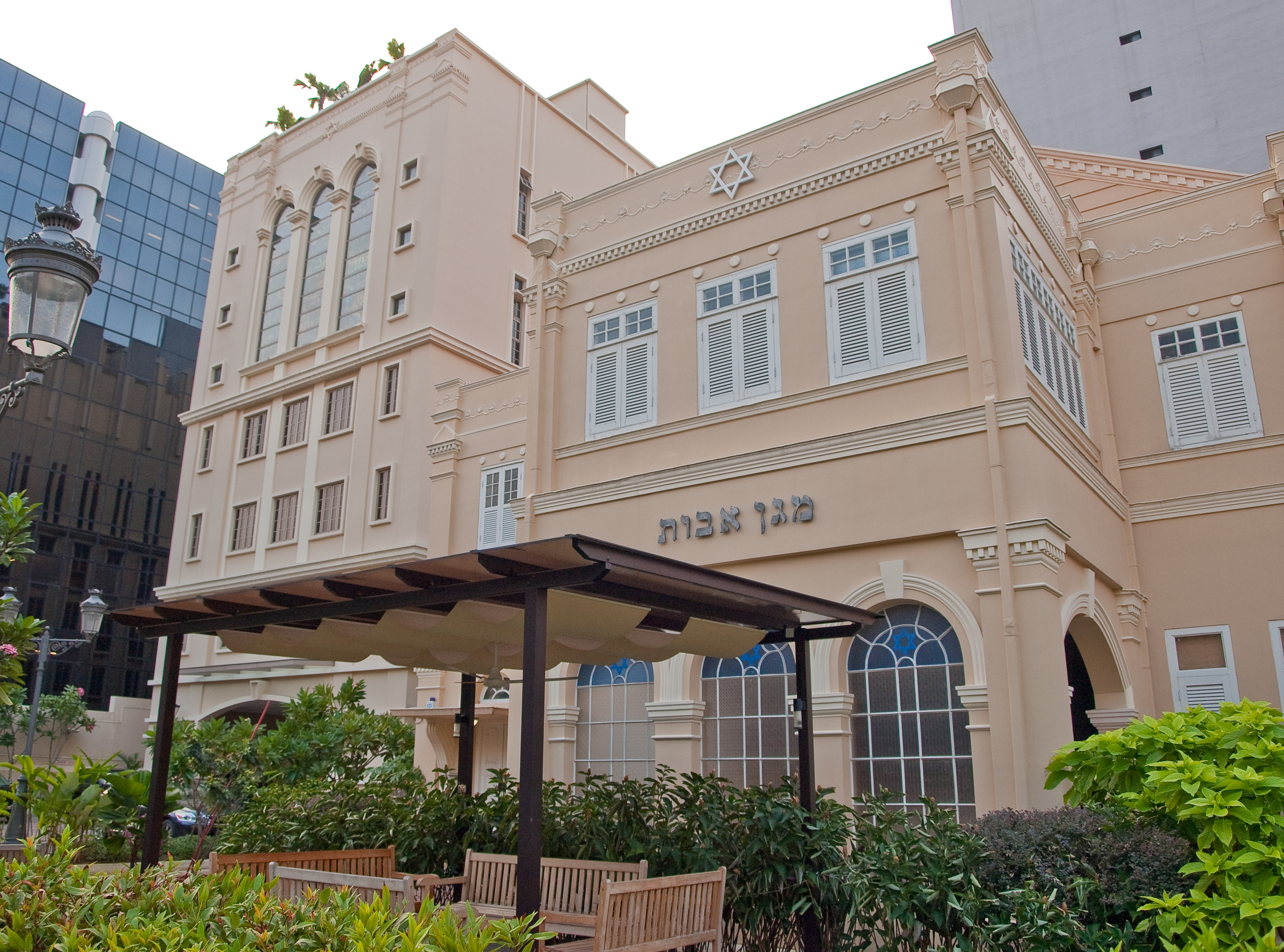
Maghain Aboth Synagogue (built 1878) is the oldest synagogue in Singapore.

The first Jews to settle in Singapore came from India in 1819. As of 2008, there are still Jews in Singapore. Their religious activities centre around two synagogues, the Maghain Aboth Synagogue and the Chesed-El Synagogue.

There were over 1,500 Jewish inhabitants in 1939. Many were interned during the Japanese occupation of Singapore in World War II, and a number subsequently emigrated to Australia, England, the United States, and Israel. As a result, the community numbered approximately 450 in 1968. In 2005, the number reached 300. Because of a large Ashkenazi immigration rate to Singapore in recent years, the population is now between 800 and 1,000, mostly foreign Ashkenazi Jews.

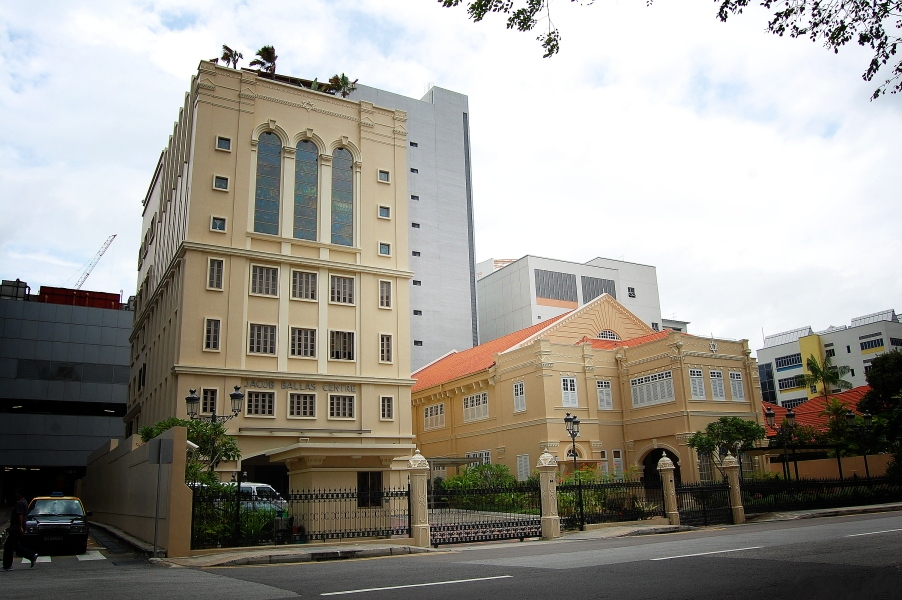
Jacob Ballas Centre (left) and Maghain Aboth Synagogue

Chesed-El Synagogue

=== Zoroastrianism ===
There is a small community of about 300 Parsi Zoroastrians residing in Singapore. There is no fire temple in Singapore, but Zoroastrian House is home to the Parsi Zoroastrian Association of South East Asia, and contains a prayer hall for the community.

== New religious movements ==
=== Arya Samaj ===
The Arya Samaj is a Hindu new religious movement founded in 1875 in Bombay by Dayananda Saraswati. It decries idol worship and believes in early Vedic teaching. The movement's followers in Singapore, first established Arya Samaj in 1927. Its present building at Syed Alwi Road was opened in 1963 by Mollamal Sachdev, whose family gave generously to the building fund.

=== Bahá'í Faith ===
K. M. Fozdar (1898–1958) and Shirin Fozdar (1905–1992), were the first to introduce the Bahá'í Faith to Singapore when they settled here in 1950. Shirin Fozdar was well known throughout Singapore and Asia for her work in the cause of women's emancipation. Her arrival in Singapore had been preceded by an article in The Straits Times on 15 September 1950 under the heading "A Woman with a Message." Through the efforts of Dr and Mrs Fozdar, by 1952 there were enough Bahá'ís in Singapore to form the first Local Spiritual Assembly. The community has since grown to over 2000 members and today there are five Local Spiritual Assemblies in Singapore.

Local Spiritual Assemblies oversee a wide range of activities including the education of children, devotional services, study classes, discussion groups, social functions, observance of holy days, marriages and funeral services. Bahá'í marriage is recognised under the laws of Singapore and the solemniser is appointed by the Registrar of Marriages. The Bahá'ís have been provided with a cemetery in Choa Chu Kang since 1957 and the nine Bahá'í Holy Days have been gazetted since 1972. Members of the first Local Spiritual Assembly of the Bahá'ís of Singapore, incorporated 28 July 1952. The five Local Spiritual Assemblies come under the jurisdiction of the Spiritual Assembly of the Bahá'ís of Singapore, the national governing council which was established in 1972.

The national governing council also appoints the executive members of the various offices which plan and carry out social service projects and collaborate with government and non-government organisations. The Bahá'í teachings stress the importance of obedience to civil government and laws. While Bahá'ís may accept non-partisan government appointments, they do not engage in partisan political activity. The members firmly uphold the injunction of Bahá'u'lláh, that 'they must behave towards the government with loyalty, honesty and truthfulness'.

There is no Baha'i House of Worship in Singapore, but there is a Baha'i Centre that serves as the administrative headquarters of the religion in Singapore.

=== Brahma Kumaris ===
The Brahma Kumaris are a millenarian Hindu new religious movement that originated in Hyderabad, Sindh in modern-day Pakistan in the 1930s. Founded by Lekhraj Kripalani. The group has since distanced itself from its Hindu roots, preferring to use the language of New Age. The Singapore Brahma Kumaris Centre operates out of its Hindoo Road location in Little India.

=== Christian Science ===
Christian Science is a non-trinitarian Christian new religious movement developed by Mary Baker Eddy who argued in her 1875 book Science and Health that sickness is an illusion that can be corrected by prayer alone. She founded the Church of Christ, Scientist in 1879. In Singapore, the church holds weekly Sunday services at The Regent Hotel on Cuscaden Road.

=== Datuk Keramat ===
The Datuk Keramat cult that exists among the Chinese in Malaysia, as a fusion of Chinese folk religion and Malay cult of keramats, is also present in Singapore. Na Tuk Kong or Datuk Gong are local guardian spirits worshipped by its adherents.

=== Eckankar ===
Eckankar, a new religious movement founded by Paul Twitchell in 1965, is active in Singapore through the Eckankar Satsang Singapore. There is no published data available on the size of the group, which holds meetings at Peace Centre.

=== Falun Gong ===
Falun Gong is a new religious movement founded in China by Li Hongzhi in the early 1990s. Riding on the qigong boom and initially enjoying support from Chinese officialdom, the movement was estimated to have 70 million practitioners in 1999. The Chinese government soon denounced the group as a cult and embarked on a nationwide crackdown. The group was registered as the Falun Buddha Society in 1996 and is headquartered at Geylang Road. The association is believed to have some 500 to 1,000 practitioners in Singapore, and publishes the Singapore edition of The Epoch Times in English and Chinese. In January 2001, 15 Falun Gong practitioners, mostly Chinese nationals, were charged with illegal assembly after organising an unauthorised vigil at a park in memory of fellow believers they say died in police custody in China. In July 2006, nine members were charged with disseminating material encouraging people to quit the Chinese Communist Party, and another three members were charged with meditating and going on hunger strike outside the Chinese embassy. Due a registration their organization as Falun Buddha Society, the Singapore Buddhist Federation calls Yiguandao, an “evil cult” and an “imitation of Buddhism,” and warns Buddhists against becoming a member of the community.

=== Hare Krishna ===
The Hare Krishna movement is active in Singapore but not through the International Society for Krishna Consciousness (ISKCON) which was banned by the government in the 1970s and remains banned today. Foreign ISKCON monks as well as Srila Prabhupada, founder of the movement, were barred by wary government authorities from entering Singapore, and all attempts by followers to officially register the society failed. Nevertheless, by avoiding affiliation with ISKCON, Hare Krishna followers have subsequently succeeded in registering their societies under different names. These include the Sri Krishna Mandir in Geylang and the Gita Reading Society at the Gauranga Centre in Serangoon.

There are also Hare Krishnas of independent branches, those are not related to ISKCON, such as the International Pure Bhakti Yoga Society.

=== Mata Amritanandamayi Math ===
The Mata Amritanandamayi Math is a new Hindu movement established in 1981 by Indian guru Mātā Amritānandamayī Devī, popularly referred to by her followers as "Amma", or by the media as the "hugging saint". Singapore was the destination of her first trip out of India in 1987 and since then, she has made frequent visits to the city-state, often attracting tens of thousands to darshan events in recent years. The Amriteswari Society was registered in Singapore in 1993 and is located at Hindoo Road in Little India.

=== Latter-day Saints ===
The Church of Jesus Christ of Latter-day Saints first began holding meetings in 1963 with a handful of followers that were living in Singapore in 1963. Church membership grew to about 100 in 1970 when the government began restricting proselytisation and visas for missionaries. In 1974, the church created the Singapore Mission, with G. Carlos Smith as the mission president. By January 1980, Singapore was opened to full-time missionaries. As of 2021, the church claims about 3,400 members in the country and operates three chapels in Bukit Timah, Pasir Panjang, and Sengkang. In August 1992, Jon Huntsman Jr., a Latter-day Saint was appointed as the United States Ambassador to Singapore. He served less than a year and left in June 1993. 21 Latter-day Saint missionaries have reportedly been sent out from Singapore to 15 countries. On 4 April 2021 at the 191st Annual General Conference, Church President Russell M. Nelson announced plans to construct a temple in Singapore. The Singapore Temple will be located on Pasir Panjang road.

=== Neopagan witchcraft ===
There are practitioners of neopagan witchcraft, mostly related to western Wicca movement, mainly in the form of online groups, classes, spiritual consultations, and the sale of amulets and other tools.

=== Quan Yin Famen ===
The Quan Yin Famen, or the Quan Yin Method, is a transnational cybersect founded in 1988 by the self-styled Taiwanese-Vietnamese Ching Hai, known variously as Suma Ching Hai or Supreme Master Ching Hai. The sect has been denounced in China as a cult and today propagates its teachings through an online TV station called Supreme Master Television. Ching Hai is the progenitor of the Loving Hut vegan restaurant chain which claims some 200 outlets in 35 countries. The Supreme Master Ching Hai Association (Singapore) is based at the Avari Centre on Geylang Road and runs a Loving Hut restaurant on Joo Chiat Road.

=== Radha Soami Satsang Beas ===
The Radha Soami Satsang Beas (RSSB) was found in Punjab, India, in 1891. It is one of organizations and traditions within Sikh-derived Radha Soami movements. In Singapore RSSB has two study centres and primary school.

=== Raëlism ===
The Singapore Raelian Movement is a regional branch of Raëlism, an UFO religion founded in the 1970s in France.

=== Rajneesh movement ===
The Rajneesh movement is a Hindu-inspired international new religious movement faunded by Osho alias Rajneesh (1931–1990) and known for its dynamic meditation. Singaporean practitioners, particularly among Westerners, coordinate events, updates, and "Osho Singapore" community gatherings via regional networks and platforms.

=== Ramakrishna Mission ===
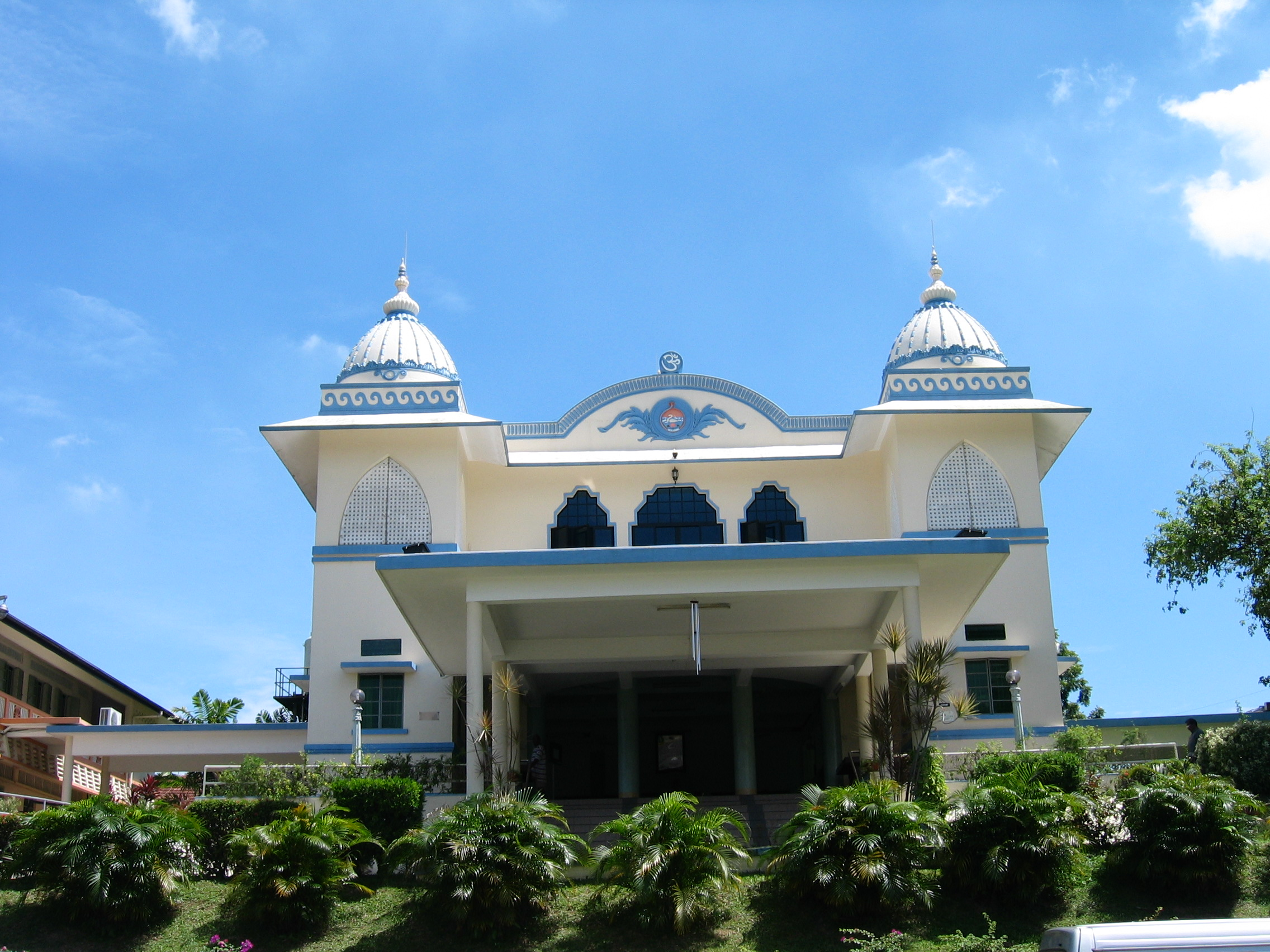
Prayer hall at the Ramakrishna Mission campus

The Ramakrishna Mission, a Hindu neo-Vedanta movement and organization, traces its history in the city back to first visit Singapore of Swami Vivekananda in 1893. In 1919 Arya Sangham donated a plot of 5,547 sq ft. land at Norris Road to set up a branch of the Mission. Later, the first within Malaya region boys' orphanage and the Sri Ramakrishna Temple were opened at Bartley Road.

=== Sathya Sai Baba movement ===
The Sathya Sai Baba movement is a new Hindu religious movement inspired by Indian spiritual guru Sathya Sai Baba (1926–2011) who followers claim to be the avatar of Shiva and Shakti and the reincarnation of Shirdi Sai Baba. During his lifetime, Sai Baba taught the unity of religions and drew crowds with purported materialisations of vibhuti and other objects, as well as claims of miraculous healings, resurrections, clairvoyance, bilocation and purported omniscience and omnipotence. The movement's history in Singapore goes back to the early 1970s, when a handful of Singaporeans began making trips to India to visit Sai Baba. In 1975, the Sri Satha Sai Society, Singapore was registered, and in 1988, a S$613,500 purchase was made for a 8,000 square foot freehold site at 133 Moulmein Road.

=== Shinnyo-en ===
Shinnyo-en is a Japanese Buddhist order founded in 1936 by Shinjō Itō and his wife Tomoji in the tradition of the Daigo branch of Shingon Buddhism. The group was formally registered in Singapore in 1994 and claims some 1,800 members who observe rituals and ceremonies at a temple at Jalan Kechot.

=== Soka Gakkai ===
Soka Gakkai is a Japanese new religious movement based on the teachings of the 13th-century Japanese Buddhist priest Nichiren. Founded in Japan in 1930 and affiliated with Nichiren Buddhism, the movement soon made its way to Singapore. The Soka Gakkai Singapore was officially registered in 1972. Its membership was estimated to be about 40,000 people in 25,000 households in 2005. The group has been an active participant at the annual National Day Parade and Chingay events. The association is headquartered in Tampines and runs a Soka Preschool there. In October 2020, it broke ground on a new centre in Punggol.

=== Spirit-Medium Cults ===
"Spirit-medium cults" are common among the Confucians of Singapore. They often revolve around "male spirit-mediums, called dang-ki" who "are subject to involuntary possession by one or more spirits" that the medium ultimately wants to happen.

The dang-ki go against Confucian beliefs on the body and mental health by self-harming "in public performances." "This behavior is accepted...because they are considered instruments of higher powers, cut off from the world of ordinary mortals."

Some dang-ki believe in a spirit who "shakes the Heavens [and] comes from the west riding on a tiger and a dragon, bearing a holy seal". This being's voice is "like thunder" and "makes the shen (spirits)...and devils tremble", it wields a sword that can kill evil spirits, and it can bring salvation.

=== Subud ===
Subud (Susila, Budhi, Dharma) is an Indonesia-origin Javanese syncretic movement founded in 1920s. The Singapore's group belongs to Australasian zone 1 of the World Subud Association.

=== Theosophical Society ===
The Singapore Lodge of the American esoteric Theosophical Society was formed in 1889. It has a large collection of rare library books on Theosophy, religion and philosophy. The Singapore Lodge Theosophical Society is located at 24 New Industrial Road and has a few hundred members from diverse ethnic background.

=== Transcendental Meditation ===
The Transcendental Meditation movement was founded by Indian guru Maharishi Mahesh Yogi in the mid-1950s. Central to the movement is a specific form of silent, mantra meditation that is practised for 15–20 minutes twice per day and is taught by certified teachers through a standard course of instruction, which costs a fee that varies by country. The Singapore TM Centre is run by The Spiritual Regeneration Movement Foundation of Singapore and located at Cendex Centre on Lower Delta Road. It charges S$1,500 per adult and S$2,400 per family for a course that includes personal instruction and follow-up group sessions.

=== True Jesus Church ===
True Jesus Church is a non-trinitarian restorationist Christian sect that emerged in 1917 in Beijing, China. With teachings influenced by both the early Pentecostal and Adventist movements, the church practices Sabbath keeping, speaking in tongues, foot washing, faith healing and water baptism by full body immersion in natural living waters, with head bowed and face downwards. Members of the True Jesus Church Singapore meet in four worship venues: Adam Road, Sembawang, Serangoon and Telok Kurau.

=== Tzu Chi ===
Tzu Chi is a new Buddhist movement that was established in 1966 by the Taiwanese bhikkuni Master Cheng Yen. Tzu Chi Singapore was founded in 1993 and headquartered at Elias Road in Pasir Ris. The movement runs clinics providing free general practitioner, traditional Chinese medicine and dental services to elderly residents and low-income households in Redhill and Khatib. It also operates the Lakeside Family Medicine Clinic in Jurong West and a day rehabilitation centre in Jurong East. The group's education mission runs pre-schools in Yishun and Toa Payoh and a Continuing Education Centre at Elias Road. The group's charitable arm provides financial assistance for kidney patients and people with HIV/AIDS.

=== World Mission Society Church of God ===
The World Mission Society Church of God is a Korean sabbatarian, restorationist Christian new religious movement established in 1964. The church believes that Ahn Sahng-hong, a former Seventh-Day Adventist preacher who died in 1985, is Christ, and refers to his wife Zahng Gil-jah, who is still living, variously as "God the Mother", "Mother Jerusalem", "New Jerusalem Mother", and "Heavenly Mother". The World Mission Society Church of God Singapore is located at Cheong Chin Nam Road.

=== Yiguandao ===
The Yiguandao is one of the most widespread new religious movements in Singapore. It is a Chinese salvationist new religion that emerged in the late 19th century. In Singapore, all branches of Yiguandao are active, the Baoguang-Jiande branch being the most successful. There, Yiguandao has three great public halls (white multiple-storied buildings with traditional Chinese architectural features) and more than 2000 house churches.

== No religious affiliation ==
As of 2020, 20% of Singaporeans had no religious affiliation. The proportion of Irreligious people is higher among Chinese people, with one in four Chinese having no religion in the 2020 Census. The Singapore non-religious community itself is very diverse, with many calling themselves atheists, agnostics, free thinkers, humanists, secularists, theists or sceptics. In addition, there some people who decline religious labels but still practice traditional rituals like ancestor worship. The number of non-religious people in Singapore has risen gradually over the decades. Census reports show that those who said they have no religion rose from 13.0% in 1980 to 17.0% in 2010 and to 20.0% in 2020 . In recent years, social gatherings of non-religious people are becoming popular in Singapore. The Singapore Humanism Meetup is a major network of over 400 secular Humanists, freethinkers, atheists, and agnostics. In October 2010, the Humanist Society (Singapore) became the first humanist group to be gazetted as a society.

Below are the ethnic breakdown of Irreligious according to the 2020 Singapore Census of Population as follows:

Ethnic Group	Total Resident Population of Ethnic Group	Population of Resident Ethnic Group registered as Irreligious	Percentage of Resident Ethnic Group registered as Irreligious	Percentage of Irreligious Residents by Ethnic Group
Chinese	2,606,881	669,097	25.67%	96.62%
Malays	447,747	1,640	0.37%	0.24%
Indians	299,056	6,443	2.15%	0.93%
Others	105,410	15,347	14.56%	2.22%
Overall	3,459,093	692,528	20.02%	100%

== Restrictions ==
The constitution provides for religious freedom, subject to restrictions relating to public order, public health, and morality. Publications and public discussions of religious issues are generally censored, along with negative or inflammatory portrayals of religion. The Government does not tolerate speech or actions that it deems could adversely affect racial or religious harmony.

In 2023, America-based Freedom House scored the country 3 out of 4 for religious freedom.

=== Jehovah's Witnesses ===
In 1972, the Singapore government de-registered and banned the activities of Jehovah's Witnesses in Singapore on the grounds that its members refuse to perform military service (which is obligatory for all male citizens), salute the flag, or swear oaths of allegiance to the state. Singapore has banned all written materials published by the International Bible Students Association and the Watchtower Bible and Tract Society, both publishing arms of the Jehovah's Witnesses. A person who possesses a prohibited publication can be fined up to S$2,000 and jailed up to 12 months for a first conviction.

=== ISKCON ===
The International Society for Krishna Consciousness (ISKCON) was banned by the government in the 1970s and remains banned today.

=== Unification church ===
In 1982, the Minister for Home Affairs dissolved the Holy Spirit Association for the Unification of World Christianity, also known as the Unification Church (and colloquially as "Moonies"), for allegedly breaking up families.

=== Islam ===
In 2011, Wikileaks published diplomatic cables which attributed controversial comments regarding Islam to Lee Kuan Yew, the Minister Mentor of Singapore's government. Wikileaks quoted Lee as having described Islam as a "venomous religion". Lee later denied making the comments.

The incident followed Lee's controversial book release Lee Kuan Yew: Hard Truths to Keep Singapore Going. In the book, Lee claimed that Singaporean Muslims faced difficulties in integrating because of their religion, and urged them to "be less strict on Islamic observances" – an assertion that is seemingly contrary to statistics and studies on the levels of social acceptance, tolerance and interracial marriages practised by Singaporean Muslims.

The speakers for broadcasting the Islamic call to prayer were turned inwards to broadcast towards the interior of the mosques as part of a noise abatement campaign in 1974.

=== Shincheonji church ===
In February 2020, Singapore began a probe into the unregistered local chapter of the Korean new religious movement Shincheonji Church of Jesus. The apocalyptic, messianic sect was known for being the centre of the first COVID-19 outbreak in South Korea. The group had fewer than 100 members in Singapore and operated covertly through a front company called Spasie Enrichment. The Ministry of Home Affairs said the group had earlier tried, and failed, to register a company under the name of Heavenly Culture, World Peace and Restoration of Light.

In November 2020, 21 members of the group were arrested for being members of an unlawful society. Five South Korean nationals who held key positions were repatriated and the group's front entities were dissolved.

== Bibliography ==
The following list of selected printed bibliographies on the topic includes both cited works and further reading.

- Abdullah, Abdul Wahab bin Hussein (2000). A Sociological Study of Keramat Beliefs in Singapore. Singapore: Dept. of Sociology, The National University of Singapore.
- Bakri, Syamsul (2020). Islam Melayu: Mozaik Kebudayaan Islam di Singapura dan Brunei (in Indonesian). [Surakarta]: Aksara Solopos. ISBN 978-623-92514-1-3.
- Burgess, Stanley M.; Maas, Eduard M. van der, eds. (2002). "Singapore". The New International Dictionary of Pentecostal and Charismatic Movements (Rev. and exp. ed.). Grand Rapids, Mi: Zondervan. pp. 223–25. ISBN 978-0-310-22481-5.
- Cheu, Hock Tong (1999). Chinese Beliefs and Practices in Southeast Asia: Studies on the Chinese Religion in Malaysia, Singapore and Indonesia. Singapore: Pelanduk Publications. ISBN 978-9679784527.
- Chia, Jack Meng Tat (June 2009). "Buddhism in Singapore: A State of the Field Review". Asian Culture (33): 81–93.
- Chia, Jack Meng-Tat (March 2016). "The Curious Case of Buddhist Activism in Singapore". Kyoto Review of Southeast Asia (19).
- Chia, Jack Meng-Tat (2020). Monks in Motion: Buddhism and Modernity Across the South China Sea. Oxford; New York: Oxford University Press. ISBN 9780197613672.
- Chin, Yolanda; Vasu, Norman (2012). The Ties that Bind and Blind: A Report on Inter-Racial and Inter-Religious Relations in Singapore. Centre of Excellence for National Security, Nanyang Technological University.
- Chunbao, Yan 嚴春寳 (2020). Xinjiapo ruxue shi 新加坡儒學史 [A History of Confucianism in Singapore] (in Chinese). Guilin, China: Guanxi Daxue chubanshe. ISBN 9787559828842.
- Clammer, John R., ed. (1983). Studies in Chinese Folk Religion in Singapore and Malaysia. Singapore: Dept. of Sociology, The National University of Singapore.
- Comber, Leon (1958). Chinese Temples in Singapore. Singapore: Eastern Universities Press; National Library Board Singapore.
- Elliott, Alan J.A. (1964). Chinese Spirit-Medium cult in Singapore. Singapore: Donald Moore.
- Eng, Lai Ah, ed. (2008). Religious Diversity in Singapore. Singapore: Institute of Southeast Asian Studies (ISEAS). ISBN 978-981-230-754-5.
- Freedman, Amy L. (2020). "Religious Minorities in Southeast Asia: The Ahmadiyah and Why Tolerance Matters". In Verma, Vidhu; Rathore, Aakash Singh (eds.). Secularism, Religion, and Democracy in Southeast Asia. Oxford: Oxford University Press. pp. 135–160. ISBN 978-0-19-909877-4.
- Gee, Francis Lim Khek (August 2011), "The Eternal Mother and the State: Circumventing Religious Management in Singapore" (PDF), Working Paper (161), Asia Research Institute, archived (PDF) from the original on 29 November 2015
- Goh, Robbie B.H. (2005). "Chap. 3. Singapore". Christianity in Southeast Asia. Singapore: ISEAS: Institute of Southeast Asian Studies Publications. pp. 35–46. ISBN 9812302972.
- Gross, L. Max (2016). A Muslim archipelago: Islam and Politics in Southeast Asia. Washington, D.C.: National Defense Intelligence College.
- Guangyu, Song (2010). "Religious Propagation, Commercial Activities, and Cultural Identity: The Spread and Development of the Yiguandao in Singapore". Chinese Studies in History. 44 (1–2): 91–120. doi:10.2753/CSH0009-4633440104.
- Helmiati (December 2021). "Muslim Religiosity in a Challenging Secular State of Singapore". QIJIS (Qudus International Journal of Islamic Studies). 9 (2): 351–386. doi:10.21043/qijis.v9i2.8026.
- Kadir, Suzaina (December 2004). "Islam, State and Society in Singapore". Inter-Asia Cultural Studies. 5 (3): 357–371. doi:10.1080/1464937042000288660. ISSN 1464-9373.
- Kahlon, Swarn Singh (2016). "Chap. 4. Sikhs in Singapore: A Model Minority". Sikhs in Asia Pacific: Travels among the Sikh Diaspora from Yangon to Kobe (PDF). New Delhi: Manohar Publisher. ISBN 978-9350981207.
- Koh, Tommy; et al., eds. (2006). Singapore: The Encyclopedia. National Heritage Board. Singapore: Editions Didier Millet. ISBN 981-4155-63-2.
- Kuah, Khun Eng (2009) [2003]. State, Society, and Religious Engineering: Towards a Reformist Buddhism in Singapore (2nd ed.). Singapore: Institute of Southeast Asian Studies (ISEAS). ISBN 978-981-230-865-8.
- Kuo, Y Eddie C.Y.; Kiong, Tong Chee (1995). Religion in Singapore. Singapore: Singapore National Printers. ISBN 9789971914592.
- Lee, Geok Boi (2002). The Religious Monuments of Singapore: Faiths of Our Forefathers. Singapore: Preservation of Monuments Board; Landmark Books. ISBN 9789813065628.
- Ling, Trevor (1993). "Singapore: Buddhist Development in a Secular State". In Ling, Trevor (ed.). Buddhist Trends in Southeast Asia. Singapore: Social Issues in Southeast Asia, Institute of Southeast Asian Studies (ISEAS). pp. 154–183. ISBN 9813035803.
- Lip, Evelyn (1983). Chinese Temple Architecture in Singapore. Singapore: Singapore University Press. ISBN 9789971690649.
- Liu, Xianjue 刘先觉; Lee, Coo 李谷 (2007). Xinjiapo Fojiao jianzhu yishu 新加坡佛教建筑艺术 [Buddhist Architecture in Singapore] (in Chinese). Singapore: Kepmedia International. ISBN 9789810582821.
- Liying, Xu 徐李穎 (2010). "Cong huaguo piaoling dao xianghuo dingsheng: Xinjiapo rujiao zai minjian fazhan de sanzhong moshi 從花果飄零到香火鼎盛: 新加坡儒教在民間發展的三種模式" [From Fall to Rise: The Three Models of the Development of Confucianism in Singapore]. In Weiyi Lin 林緯毅 (Ning Ngoi Ngi) (ed.). Bie qi wei zong: Dongnanya de ruxue yu kongjiao 別起為宗: 東南亞的儒學與孔教 [Establishing a Separate Branch of Transmission: Confucian Learning and the Confucian Religious Sect in Southeast Asia] (in Chinese). Singapore: Singapore Society of Asian Studies. pp. 210–229.
- Lo, Yuet Keung (2006). "Buddhism". In Koh, Tommy; et al. (eds.). Singapore: The Encyclopedia. National Heritage Board. Singapore: Editions Didier Millet. pp. 74–75. ISBN 981-4155-63-2.
- Mandryk, Jason (2010). "Singapore". Operation World: The Definitive Prayer Guide to Every Nation (7th rev. ed.). Downers Grove, Il: InterVarsity Press. ISBN 978-0-8308-5724-1.
- McDougall, Colin (1956). Buddhism in Malaya. Singapore: Donald Moore.
- Melton, J. Gordon; Baumann, Martin, eds. (2010). "Singapore". Religions of the world: a comprehensive encyclopedia of beliefs and practices (PDF). Vol. 6 (2nd ed.). Santa Barbara, Ca; Denver, Co; Oxford: ABC-Clio. ISBN 978-1-59884-203-6.
- Mutalib, Hussin (2008). "Chap. 5. Singapore". Islam in Southeast Asia. Southeast Asia Background Series, 11. Singapore: ISEAS–Yusof Ishak Institute. pp. 47–58. ISBN 978-981-230-759-0.
- Mutalib, Hussin (2012). Singapore Malays: Being Ethnic Minority and Muslim in a Global City-State. London; New York: Routledge. ISBN 978-1-136-30732-4.
- Nasir, Kamaludeen Mohamed; Pereira, Alexius; Turner, Bryan S. (2009). Muslims in Singapore. London; New York: Routledge. ISBN 978-1-135-27596-9.
- Ong, Chang Woei; Koh, Khee Heong (October 2021). "Becoming a Confucian in Contemporary Singapore: The Case of Nanyang Confucian Association". Religions. 12 (10: Special Issue: Empirical Studies of Contemporary Confucian Practice in Asia and Beyond): 854. doi:10.3390/rel12100854. ISSN 2077-1444.
- Ong, Y.D. (2005). Buddhism in Singapore: A Short Narrative History. Singapore: Skylark Publications.
- Peacock, James L. (1978). "Chap. 5. Singapore". Muslim Puritans: Reformist Psychology in Southeast Asian Islam. Berkeley and Los Angeles, Ca: University of California Press. pp. 143–174. ISBN 0-520-03403-1.
- Piyasilo (1988). Buddhist Culture: An Observation of the Buddhist Situation in Malaysia and Singapore and a Suggestion. Petaling Jaya, Selangor: The Friends of Buddhism Malaysia.
- Shi, Chuanfa 释传发 (1997). Xinjiapo Fojiao Fazhan Shi 新加坡佛教发展史 [A History of the Development of Buddhism in Singapore] (in Chinese). Singapore: Xinjiapo fojiao jushilin.
- Sinha, Vineeta (1997). "Unpacking the Labels" Hindu" and" Hinduism" in Singapore". Asian Journal of Social Science. 25 (2): 139–160. doi:10.1163/030382497X00211.
- Sinha, Vineeta (2011). Religion and Commodification 'Merchandizing' Diasporic Hinduism. London; New York: Routledge. ISBN 978-0-415-65145-5.
- Sofjan, Dicky, ed. (2013). Sejarah & Budaya Syiah di Asia Tenggara (in Indonesian). Yogyakarta: Penerbit Sekolah Pascasarjana Universitas Gadjah Mada. ISBN 978-979-25-0118-6.
- Tan, Charlene (March 2007). "Islam and Citizenship Education in Singapore: Challenges and Implications". Education, Citizenship and Social Justice. 2 (1): 23–39. doi:10.1177/1746197907072124. ISSN 1746-1979.
- Thio, Li-ann (2020). "Ambivalence, Accommodation, Antipathy, and Anxiety: Religion and Singapore's Secular Democratic Order". In Verma, Vidhu; Rathore, Aakash Singh (eds.). Secularism, Religion, and Democracy in Southeast Asia. Oxford: Oxford University Press. pp. 54–87. ISBN 978-0-19-909877-4.
- Tjandra, Lukas (1990). Folk religion among the Chinese in Singapore and Malaysia. Ann Arbour, Mi: University Microfilms International.
- Tschacher, Torsten (2006). "From Local Practice to Transnational Network — Saints, Shrines and Sufis among Tamil Muslims in Singapore". Asian Journal of Social Science. 34 (2): 225–242. doi:10.1163/156853106777371201. JSTOR 23654418.
- Tong, Chee-Kiong (2007). Rationalizing Religion: Religious Conversion, Revivalism and Competition in Singapore Society. Social Sciences in Asia, 13. Leiden: Brill. ISBN 978-90-04-15694-4.
- Wee, Vivienne (1997) [1976]. "Buddhism in Singapore". In Jin Hui Ong; Chee-Kiong Tong; Ern Ser Tan (eds.). Understanding Singapore Society. Singapore: Times Academic Press. pp. 130–162. ISBN 981-210-052-0.
- Woods, Orlando; Kong, Lily (March 2023). "The Partial Secularisms of Singapore's Muslim Minorities: Arbitraging Model Citizenship and (In)Complete Selves at the Margins". Annals of the American Association of Geographers. 113 (3): 616–634. doi:10.1080/24694452.2022.2124146. ISSN 2469-4452.
- Yen, Ching-Hwang (1976). "The Confucian Revival Movement in Singapore and Malaya, 1899–1911". Journal of Southeast Asian Studies. 7 (3): 33–57. doi:10.1017/S0022463400010250. JSTOR 20070162.
