= List of Buddhist temples in Singapore =

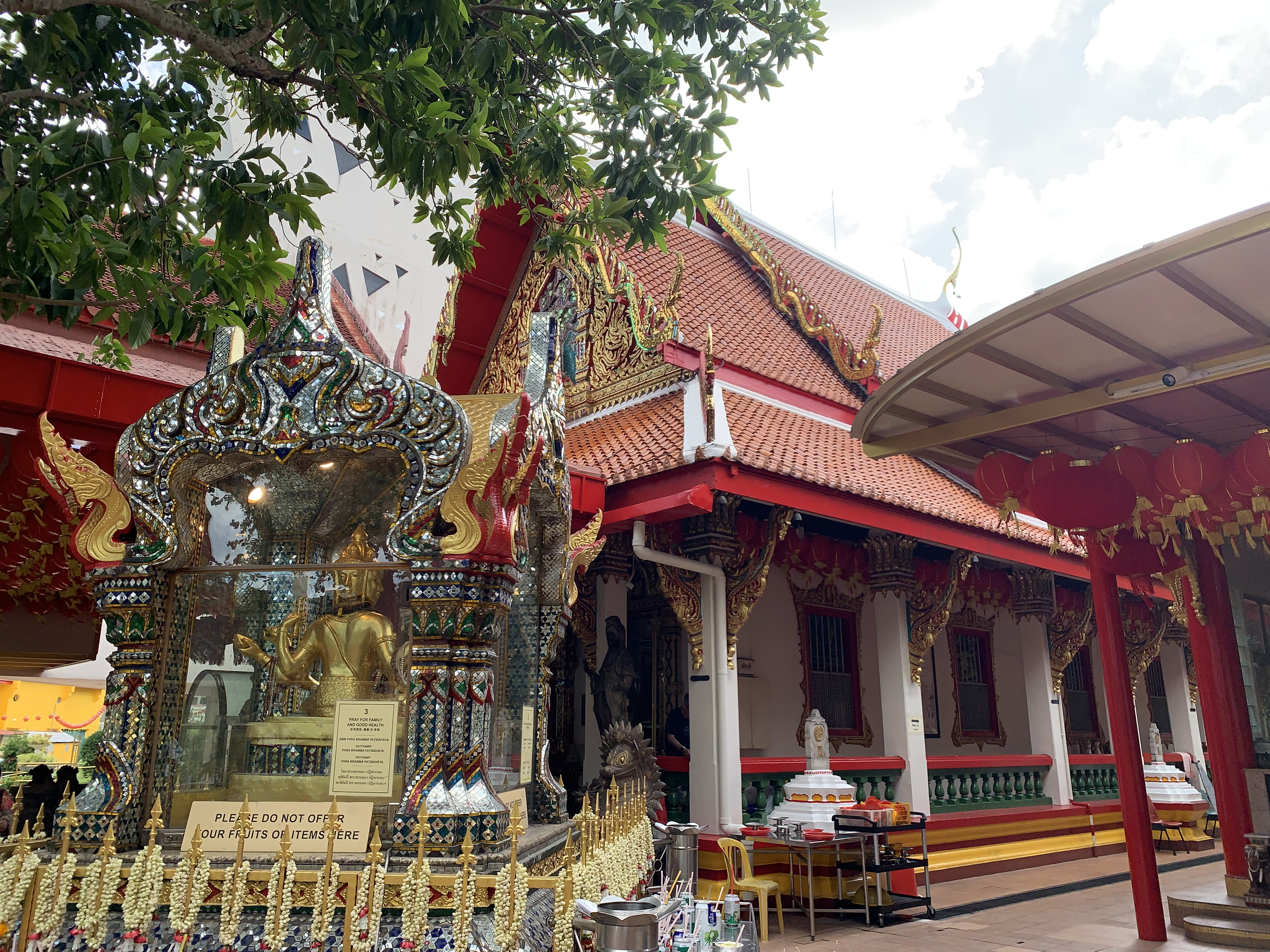
Wat Ananda, prominent Thai Buddhist temple in Singapore

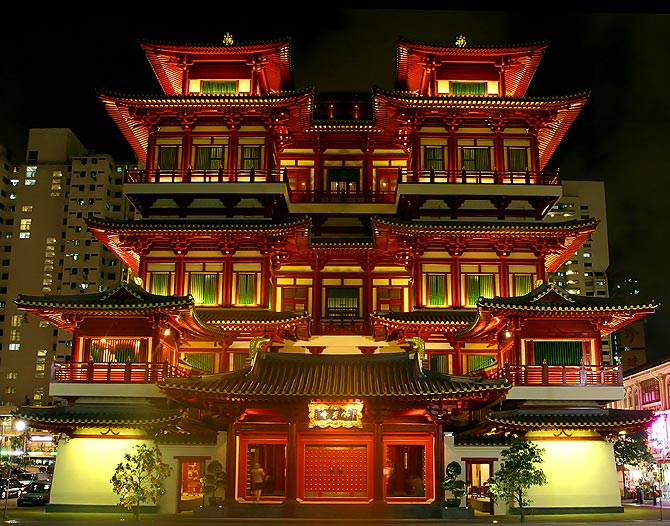
Modern architecture of the Buddha Tooth Relic Temple and Museum in Singapore

This is a list of Buddhist temples, monasteries, stupas, centres and pagodas in Singapore for which there are Wikipedia articles.

== Theravada Buddhism ==
- Burmese Buddhist Temple
- Palelai Buddhist Temple
- Sakya Muni Buddha Gaya Temple
- Sri Lankaramaya Buddhist Temple
- Wat Ananda Metyarama Thai Buddhist Temple
- Ti-Sarana Buddhist Association
- Vipassana Meditation Centre

== Mahayana Buddhism ==
- Buddha of Medicine Welfare Society
- Buddha Tooth Relic Temple and Museum
- Cheng Beng Buddhist Society
- Foo Hai Ch'an Monastery
- Hai Inn Temple
- Hua Giam Si
- Jin Long Si Temple
- Kong Meng San Phor Kark See Monastery
- Kwan Im Thong Hood Cho Temple
- Kwan Yin Chan Lin
- Lian Shan Shuang Lin Monastery
- Poh Ern Shih Temple
- Singapore Buddhist Lodge
- Tai Pei Yuen
- Tzu Chi Singapore

== Vajrayana Buddhism ==
- Amitabha Buddhist Centre
- Drigar Thubten Dargye Ling
- Karma Kagyud Buddhist Centre
- Thekchen Choling

== Non-denominational Buddhism ==
- Buddhist Library

== See also ==
- Bright Vision Hospital
- Buddhism in Singapore
- List of Buddhist temples
- Manjusri Secondary School
- Wat Ananda Youth
