= List of Hokkien people =

This is a list of notable Hokkien people. Unless otherwise noted, locations noted are of ancestral locations in Southern Fujian, China.

== Academia and Science ==
- Zeng Gongliang (曾公亮, 998–1078) was a Chinese scholar of the Song dynasty, who helped to write the Wujing Zongyao (Complete Essentials for the Military Classics) .
- Lee Y. Tse (李遠哲, ancestry: Nan'an City) - Nobel Prize winner in Chemistry in 1986.
- March Tian Boedihardjo (沈詩鈞/沈诗钧, ancestry: Anxi): mathematics child genius he was enrolled in a university at only 9 years old graduating one year early, became a mathematics professor at 18
- Lim Boon Keng (林文慶, 1869–1957; ancestry: Longhai, Zhangzhou), first Singaporean to receive a Queen's Scholarship and advocated social and educational reforms in Singapore in the early 20th-century, also served as president of Xiamen University (1921–1937)
- Li Denghui (educator) (李登輝, Tong'an): First President of the famous Fudan University of Shanghai.
- Su Buqing (蘇步青, ancestry: Jinjiang City): mathematician and President of Fudan University
- Cai Liusheng (蔡镏生): Academician of the Chinese Academy of Sciences. He was one of the founders of catalytic kinetics in China.
- Wang Yinglai (王應睞, Kinmen island) - Chinese biochemist recognized as the first person to create synthetic insulin
- Cai Qirui (蔡啟瑞/蔡启瑞) - the founder of Chinese catalytic chemistry
- Xie Xide (謝希德/谢希德) also known as Hilda Hsieh. Prominent Chinese physicist, president of Fudan University from 1983 to 1989, and remained as advisor to the university from 1989 until her death. She helped to set up the university's Centre for American Studies and founded its Modern Physics Institute in 1977. Referred to as someone the Nobel prize committee missed
- Peng Shilu (彭士禄, 18 Nov 1925 – 22 Mar 2021; Haifeng) - Nuclear engineer, Hailed the "Father of China's nuclear submarines".
- Huang Zhanyue (黄展岳), Born August 1926, Nan'an city. Prominent Chinese archaeologist and Professor at the Institute of Archaeology, Chinese Academy of Social Sciences. Research focus was on the archaeology of China from the Han dynasty to the Tang dynasty.
- Sow-Hsin Chen (陳守信/陈守信, born 1935 in Chiayi, Taiwan) - physicist and professor emeritus at Massachusetts Institute of Technology (MIT), a recognized pioneer in the research of dynamic properties of supercooled and interfacial water
- Leon Chua (蔡少棠, born June 28, 1936; ancestry: Jinjiang) - computer scientist, professor at the University of California, Berkeley and the inventor of the Chua's circuit.
- Zhong Nanshan (鐘南山/钟南山; ancestral home in Xiamen of SHe ancestry) Top epidemiologist, pulmonologist adviser to the Chinese government during the SARS and COVID-19 pandemics. Recipient of Order of the Republic, the highest order of honor of China. Named by Time magazine as one of the 100 most influential people in the world in 2020.
- Lin Junde (林俊德, 13 March 1938, Yongchun County, Quanzhou) - Explosion Mechanics scientist and Researcher at Xinjiang Malan Nuclear Test Base. Honored as one of the "Ten People Who Moved China".
- Zhijian Chen (陳志堅/陈志坚) (born 1966; Anxi, Quanzhou) - a biochemist and professor at University of Texas Southwestern Medical Center, recipient of the 2019 Breakthrough Prize in Life Sciences
- Fang Zhouzi (方舟子, Sep 28, 1967; Yunxiao County, Zhangzhou) - postdoctoral researcher in molecular genetics and Chinese popular science writer.
- Xie Hua'an (谢华安) of (Longyan, Fujian). Chinese agronomist best known for developing the hybrid rice "Shan-You 63" which is a milestone for China's hybrid rice development and production because of its high yield, disease resistance, excellent rice quality and wide adaptability.
- Lin Qiaozhi or Kha-Ti Lim (林巧稚) of (Xiamen, Fujian). One of China's most prominent obstetrician and gynecologist.
- Lu Jiaxi (chemist) (卢嘉锡, 1915–2001) of Xiamen, Fujian. The physical chemist who is considered a founder of the discipline in China. In 1998, the asteroid 3844 Lujiaxi was named in his honor.

Authors/Writers

- Petrus Kanisius Ojong aka Auwjong Peng Koen, (Ancestry - Kinmen, Fujian) journalist and businessman who was one of the founders of Kompas Gramedia Group, Indonesia's largest conglomerate and Kompas, one of Indonesia's most circulated daily newspapers
- Lauw Giok Lan (劉玉蘭; 1883–1953), Indonesian journalist, writer and one of the founders of the newspaper Sin Po
- Thio Tjin Boen (張振文; 1885–1940), Indonesian writer of Malay-language fiction and a journalist
- Kwee Tek Hoay (郭德懷; 1886–1951), Indonesian writer of novels and drama, important proponent of Tri-Dharma and credited with the publication of Dharma Moestika (1932–1934) and a list of publications

== Business ==
- Li Dan (李旦; died 1625; ancestry: Quanzhou), prominent early 17th century Chinese merchant and political figure in Japan, became part of the shuinsen trade, with a formal vermillion seal license from the Tokugawa shogunate
- Wu Bingjian (伍秉鑑; 1769–1843; ancestry: Jinjiang, Quanzhou), known as Howqua in the West, the "Richest man in the world" during his time, 19th century Qing dynasty. Single-handedly contributed a third of the three million dollars that the Qing government was required to pay the British as stipulated in the Treaty of Nanking, (First Opium War) 1842.
- Kiong Kong Tuan (龔光傳; 1790–1854), Penang Hokkien merchant who was the last opium farmer in Singapore.
- Kan Keng Tjong (1797–1871; ancestry: Zhangzhou), Chinese-Indonesian tycoon and one of the richest men in Batavia, capital of the Dutch East Indies
- Chan Mah Phee (曾廣庇; 1848; ancestry: Tong'an, Xiamen), businessman, land-owner, investor and philanthropist who founded numerous successful ventures in Yangon, Burma. He had built Chan Mah Phee hospital in Ahlon and Chan Ma Phee hall of Shwedagon Pagoda was named in recognition of his patronage and support
- Koo Hsien-jung (辜顯榮; 1866–1937; ancestry: Hui'an, Quanzhou), businessman and politician who enjoyed strong links to the colonial administration of Taiwan under Japanese rule. He founded the Koos Group of companies, the largest business group in Taiwan.
- Tan Kah Kee (陈嘉庚; 1874–1961; ancestry: Jimei, Xiamen), Singapore Chinese businessman, philanthropist and prominent figure in the overseas Chinese community. Donated most of his assets and earnings to aid China in major events such as Xinhai Revolution (1911), the Second Sino-Japanese War (1937–45) and establishing numerous schools in China and South East Asia. He is also the founder of The Xiamen University, Fujian Province.
- Neo Ao Tiew (梁後宙; 1884–1975; ancestry: Nan'an, Quanzhou), Chinese businessman, philanthropist and community leader, best known for developing the Lim Chu Kang area of Singapore.
- Lee Choon Seng (李俊成; 1888–1966; ancestry: Yongchun, Quanzhou), prominent businessman, philanthropist and lay Buddhist leader. He started several local Chinese banks, including Ho Hong Bank which eventually merged with two other banks to form the Oversea-Chinese Banking Corporation (OCBC).
- Dee Ching Chuan (李清泉; 1888–1940; ancestry: Jinjiang, Quanzhou) businessman, philanthropist, and activist known as the Philippines "Lumber King" during the American colonial rule, also founded China Banking Corporation (China Bank) in 1920.
- Lee Kong Chian (李光前; 1893–1967; ancestry: Nan'an, Quanzhou), One of the richest men in Southeast Asia in the 1950s and 1960s. He poured his wealth into education and other philanthropic work, and eventually set up Lee Foundation for charitable purpose.
- Tan Lark Sye (陳六使; 1897–1972; ancestry: Jimei, Xiamen), prominent businessman and philanthropist, became one of the leading rubber industrialists of the region in the 1950s. He initiated the founding of Nanyang University in 1953 and donated S$5 million to its building fund, as well as 523 acres of land for its campus on behalf of Singapore Hokkien Huay Kuan.
- Tan Chin Tuan (陈振传; 1908–2005), Peranakan banker and philanthropist often credited with helping to establish the OCBC Bank.
- Go Peh-hok (吳百福; 1910–2007), also known as Momofuku Ando, inventor and businessman born in Imperial Japanese Taiwan who founded Nissin Food Products Co., Ltd. He is also the inventor of instant noodles and the creator of the brands, Top Ramen and Cup Noodles.
- Kwek Hong Png (郭芳楓; 1913–1994; ancestry: Tong'an, Xiamen), entrepreneur and founder of Hong Leong Group.
- Khoo Teck Puat (邱德拔; 1917–2004; ancestry: Haicang, Xiamen), founder of Malayan Banking, largest single shareholder of the British bank Standard Chartered and owned the Goodwood Group.
- Wang Yung-ching (王永慶; 1917–2008; ancestry: Anxi, Quanzhou), Taiwanese entrepreneur who founded a large business empire, Forbes ranked him as the 178th richest person worldwide in 2008.
- Lim Goh Tong (林梧桐; 1918–2007; ancestry: Anxi, Quanzhou), prominent wealthy businessman & entrepreneur, who founded the Genting Group in Malaysia and donated most scenic site of Genting Highlands to build Chin Swee Caves Temple
- Lau Gim Kok (劉錦國；1920–2018; ancestry: Kinmen) Bruneian businessman who founded Hua Ho, a well-known local supermarket and department store chain as well as an agricultural farm in Brunei.
- Henry Sy (施振榮; 1924–2019; ancestry: Jinjiang, Quanzhou), the richest man in the Philippines (named by Forbes in 2015).
- Wee Cho Yaw (黃祖耀; born 1929; ancestry: Kinmen island) - billionaire businessman and the chairman of the United Overseas Bank (UOB) and United Industrial Corporation (UIC) in Singapore.
- Lucio Tan (陳永栽; born 1934; ancestry: Jinjiang, Quanzhou), Filipino businessman and philanthropist, owner of the Philippine National Bank, and chairman and CEO of Philippine Airlines and the Lucio Tan Group of Companies which owns many of the country's distilleries.
- Robert Budi (黃惠忠; born 1940 in Semarang, Java, Indonesia) and Michael Bambang Hartono (黃輝祥; born 1939 in Kudus, Indonesia) - brothers, the richest persons in Indonesia.
- Tony Tan Caktiong (陳覺中; born 1953; ancestry: Jinjiang, Quanzhou), founder and chairman of Jollibee Foods Corporation and the co-chairman of DoubleDragon Properties.
- Sim Wong Hoo (沈望傅; born 1955; ancestry: Zhao'an, Zhangzhou) - the founder, CEO and chairman of Creative Technology.
- Pua Khein-Seng (潘健成; born 1974; ancestry: Yongchun, Quanzhou), the inventor of the USB flash drive and CEO of Phison Electronics Corporation in Taiwan.

== Kings ==
- Hokkien ruled Vietnam Lý dynasty (李朝) 1009-1225 AD, Đại Việt Quốc (大越國)
  - Lý Thái Tổ
  - Lý Thái Tông
  - Lý Thánh Tông
  - Lý Nhân Tông
  - Lý Chiêu Hoàng, was the ninth and last sovereign of the Lý dynasty, empress of Đại Việt from 1224 to 1225. She is the only empress regnant in Vietnamese history and the last Vietnamese female monarch
- Hokkien ruled Vietnam Trần dynasty (茹陳) 1225–1400 AD, Đại Việt Quốc (大越國)
  - Trần Thái Tông (ancestry from Xinluo district, Longyan, Fujian )
  - Trần Thánh Tông
  - Trần Nhân Tông
  - Trần Anh Tông
  - Trần Thiếu Đế

== Politicians & Public Office ==
China

- Huang Daozhou (黃道周, 1585–1646; Zhangzhou, Fujian), obtained the degree of Jinshi in 1622. He subsequently held various government positions, including Minister for Education during the Ming dynasty. Killed by the Manchu invaders for refusing to surrender.
- Hong Chengchou (洪承疇; 1593–1665; Nan'an, Quanzhou), Chinese official under the Ming and Qing dynasties
- Li Guangdi (李光地; 1642–1718; Anxi, Quanzhou), Prominent Qing dynasty court official during Emperor KangXi's reign.
- Shi Shilun (施世綸; 1659–1722; Jinjiang, Quanzhou), a much-praised Qing dynasty official during the Kangxi Emperor's reign and was the son of general Shi Lang.
- Chen Jiongming (陳炯明; 1878–1933; Haifeng county), governor of Guangdong and Guangxi during the Republic of China period.
- Chen Boda (陈伯达; 1904–1989) (Hui'an, Quanzhou), close associate of Mao Zedong, chairing the Cultural Revolution Group
- Peng Chong (彭冲,1915 –2010, born Xu Tieru 許鐵如; Zhangzhou, Fujian ) member of the Chinese Communist Party Central Committee (1969–87), Politburo (1977–82); and Secretary General of the National People's Congress (1988–1992).
- Xu Kunlin (许昆林) of Yongchun County, Fujian. Governor of Jiangsu Province
- Liu Cigui, (刘赐贵) of Quanzhou, Fujian. Communist Party Secretary of Hainan province. His former positions include Governor of Hainan, Director of the State Oceanic Administration and China Coast Guard.
- Zheng Shanjie, (郑栅洁) of Zhangzhou, Fujian. Chairman of the National Development and Reform Commission (NDRC) since March 2023, Communist Party Secretary of Anhui Province and formerly served as the Governor and Deputy Party Secretary of Zhejiang.
- Chen Binhua,（陈斌华）of Zhao'an, Fujian, Director of the Information Bureau of the Taiwan Affairs Office of the State Council

Republic of China (Taiwan)

- Chen Shui-bian (陳水扁; born 1950 in Guantian, Tainan; ancestry: Zhao'an, Zhangzhou), 5th President of the Republic of China.
- Lien Chan (連戰, born 1936 in Xi'an, Shaanxi province, ancestry: Longhai, Zhangzhou) He was the Chairman of the Taiwan Provincial Government from 1990 to 1993, Premier of the Republic of China from 1993 to 1997, Vice President of the Republic of China from 1996 to 2000.
- Vincent Siew (蕭萬長; born 1939 in Chiayi City, Taiwan Island; Vice President of the Republic of China from 2008 to 2012. He was the former vice-chairman of the Kuomintang (KMT).
- Wu Den-yih (吳敦義). Vice President of the Republic of China, 2012 to 2016. Premier of the Republic of China, 2009 – 2012. Chairman of the Kuomintang (KMT), 2017- 2020.
- Chang Chun-hsiung (張俊雄). Served as Premier of the Republic of China twice, 2000- 2002 and 2007–2008.
- Hsieh Chang-ting (謝長廷; born 1946 in Taipei; ancestry: Dongshan, Zhangzhou), politician and former defense attorney, was Premier of Taiwan and mayor of Kaohsiung City
- Wang Jin-pyng (王金平). President of the Legislative Yuan from 1999 to 2016, longest-serving legislative speaker.
- Lai In-jaw (賴英照) President of the Judicial Yuan 2007- 2012, Vice Premier of the Republic of China 2000 – 2002 and Chief Justice of the Constitutional Court of the Republic of China.
- Mark Chen (陳唐山, 1935) Served as Minister of Foreign Affairs

Indonesia

- Abdurrahman Wahid (7 September 1940 – 30 December 2009). 4th President of Indonesia. Direct descendant of Tan Kiem Han of Quanzhou, Fujian. Tan Kiem Han is a member of the Ming Dynasty delegation led by Admiral Cheng Ho during the 15th century AD.
- Souw Beng Kong (蘇鳴崗; 1580–1644, born in Tong An, Fujian, Ming Dynasty). Appointed by Pangeran Ratu, Sultan of Banten (1596–1647) as the Kapitan Cina, or Chinese headman, of Banten. Later was appointed first Kapitein der Chinezen of Batavia, capital of colonial Indonesia by the Governor-General of the Dutch East Indies. This was the most senior Chinese position in the colonial civil bureaucracy with legal and political jurisdiction over the local Chinese community in the colony.
- Han Siong Kong (1673–1743, Born in Tianbao, Zhangzhou, Fujian) Founder of the Han family of Lasem, the Chinese gentry (baba bangsawan) which has played significant roles as bureaucrats and politicians in the Dutch colonial Indonesia.
- Khouw Tjoen the founder of the Khouw family of Tamboen, one of the most prominent dynasties of the 'Tjabang Atas' or Chinese gentry of colonial Indonesia.
- Tan Eng Goan, (陳永元; 1802 – 1872) was a high-ranking bureaucrat who served as the First Majoor der Chinezen of Batavia (now Jakarta), capital of colonial Indonesia. This was the highest-ranking Chinese position in the civil administration of the Dutch East Indies.Initiated the first ever annual "Pasar Malam", or night market, held in Batavia three days prior to Lunar New Year which served as a prototype for similar and later markets elsewhere.
- Khouw Kim An (許金安; 1875–1945) served as the fifth and last Majoor der Chinezen ("Major of the Chinese") of Batavia in Dutch East Indies and belonged to the Khouw family of Tamboen
- Loa Sek Hie (賴錫禧; 1898 - 1965) Indonesian-Chinese colonial politician, parliamentarian and founding Voorzitter or chairman of the Indon ethnic-Chinese self-defense force "Pao An Tui" (or Peace Keeping Force in the Minnan Hokkien language) (1946–1949)
- Kwik Kian Gie (郭建義). Coordinating Minister of Economics and Finance from 1999 to 2000, and Minister of National Development Planning from 2001 to 2004.
- Mari Elka Pangestu (冯慧兰, 1956), first female Indonesian of Chinese descent to hold a cabinet position in Indonesia. Previously served as Minister of Trade, Minister of Cooperatives and Small & Medium Enterprises and Minister of Tourism and Creative Economy.

Singapore

- Choa Chong Long (蔡滄浪; 1788–1838) was a Chinese prominent magnate, revenue farmer and pioneering colonist who served as the first Kapitan China of Singapore appointed by Sir Stamford Raffles under the British colonial government.
- Tan Tock Seng (陳篤生; 1798–1850; ancestry: Haicheng, Zhangzhou), first Asian to be appointed Justice of the Peace, served as acting Kapitan China of Singapore (government-appointed head of the Chinese community) and founder of Tan Tock Seng Hospital.
- Tan Kim Ching (陳金鐘; 1829–1892; ancestry: Haicheng, Zhangzhou), served as Kapitan China of the Chinese community, was also the consul for Japan, Siam and Russia, and was a member of the Royal Court of Siam.
- Tan Kim Seng (陳金聲; 1805–1864; ancestry: Yongchun, Quanzhou), Chinese community leader (Hokkien) and first magistrate of Chinese descent in Singapore
- Ong Eng Guan (王永元; 1925–2008), first and only duly elected Mayor of Singapore
- Lim Chin Siong (林清祥; 1933–1996; ancestry: Jinjiang, Quanzhou), former legislative assemblyman for Bukit Timah Constituency, prominent trade union leader and Secretary-General of Barisan Sosialis
- Chia Thye Poh (谢太宝; 1941), former Leader of the Opposition and MP for Jurong Constituency.
- Wee Kim Wee (黃金輝; 1915–2005; ancestry: Longhai, Zhangzhou), 4th President of Singapore
- Ong Teng Cheong (王鼎昌; 1936–2002; ancestry: Tongan, Xiamen), 5th President of Singapore
- Tan Keng Yam Tony (陳慶炎; 1940; ancestry: Xiamen), 7th President of Singapore
- Goh Chok Tong (吳作棟; 1941; ancestry: Yongchun, Quanzhou), the 2nd Prime Minister of Singapore
- Toh Chin Chye (杜进才; 1921–2012), 1st Deputy Prime Minister of Singapore
- Goh Keng Swee (吳慶瑞; 1918–2010), 2nd Deputy Prime Minister of Singapore
- Gan Kim Yong (颜金勇), 13th Deputy Prime Minister of Singapore
- Wee Chong Jin (黄宗仁; 1917–2005) The first Chief Justice of Asian descent of Singapore and the longest serving Chief Justice in the British Commonwealth .
- Lim Yew Hock (林有福; 1914–1984; ancestry from Kinmen, Fujian), served as the second and last Chief Minister of Colonial Singapore between 1956 and 1959.
- Lim Guan Hoo (林源河; 1939–1977; ancestry from Dongshan, Zhangzhou), served as Parliamentary Secretary for Home Affairs and MP for Bukit Merah Constituency.
- Ch'ng Jit Khoon (庄日昆; 1934–2024; ancestry from Hui'an, Quanzhou), served as Senior Minister of State for Community Development and MP for Tiong Bahru Constituency.
- Chai Chong Yii (蔡崇语; 1935–2022; ancestry from Jinjiang, Quanzhou), served as Minister of State and MP for Bukit Batok Constituency.
- Chee Soon Juan (徐顺全; 1962), prominent opposition politician and Secretary-General of the Singapore Democratic Party.

Malaysia

- Koh Lay Huan (辜禮歡; died 1826, born in Tong An, Zhang Zhou, Fujian) was a rebel against the Manchu-led Qing dynasty and fled to Siam and the Malay States, to eventually settle in Penang as its First Kapitan China of Penang and one of the pioneering leaders of Penang.
- Ong Tiang Swee (王長水; 1864–1950) Served as the Kapitan China of the Raj of Sarawak, President of the Chinese Chamber of Commerce, as well as an Advisor on Chinese Affairs and confidant to Charles Brooke, Rajah of Sarawak.
- Tan Cheng Lock (陳禎祿; 1883–1960; ancestry: Zhangzhou), one of the founding fathers of modern-day Malaysia, along with Tunku Abdul Rahman and the founder, first president of the Malayan Chinese Association.
- Tan Siew Sin (陳修信; 1916–1988; ancestry: Zhangzhou), longest-serving Finance Minister in Malaysia (1961–1974) and the son of Tun Dato' Sir Tan Cheng Lock
- Chang Ling-Yun (章凌雲; 1921–1989), Member of the Politburo of the Malayan Communist Party.
- Lim Chong Eu (林蒼祐; 1919–2010; ancestry: Tong'an, Xiamen), 2nd Chief Minister of Penang.
- Ong Kee Hui (王其輝; 1914–2000; ancestry Longhai, Zhangzhou) Served as the Minister of Local Government & Housing and Minister of Science Technology & Environment. Founder and 1st president of the Sarawak United People's Party.
- Lim Kit Siang (林吉祥; 1941; ancestry: Dongshan, Zhangzhou) Longest serving Parliamentary Opposition Leader and 2nd Longest serving member of Parliament of Malaysia.
- Lim Keng Yaik (林敬益; 1939–2012; ancestry: Anxi, Quanzhou), Minister of Energy, Water and Communications
- Koh Tsu Koon (許子根; 1949; ancestry: Xiamen),3rd Chief Minister of Penang (1990–2008)
- Ong Ka Ting (黄家定, 1956) Served as Minister of Housing and Local Government.
- Ong Ka Chuan (黄家泉, 1954) Served as Second Minister for International Trade and Industry and later as Minister of Housing and Local Government
- Lim Guan Eng (林冠英; 1960; ancestry: Dongshan, Zhangzhou), 4th Chief Minister of Penang and was also Minister of Finance. Son of Lim Kit Siang
- Yeo Bee Yin (杨美盈; 1983) Minister of Energy, Science, Technology, Environment and Climate Change.
- Hannah Yeoh Tseow Suan (杨巧双: 1979) Minister of Youth and Sports, 10th Speaker of the Selangor State Legislative Assembly 2013–2018.
- Steven Sim Chee Keong (沈志强, 1982) Minister of Human Resources. Named as a Young Global Leader of the Geneva-based World Economic Forum in 2012.

Philippines

- Tan Quien Sien (陳謙善; 1844–1901; ancestry: Tong'an, Xiamen), served as gobernadorcillo who helped funding the establishment of the Chinese General Hospital in 1891 and it was also through his efforts that Manila Chinese Cemetery & Chong Hock Tong Temple were established. He was also the first acting consul general of Qing China to Spanish Philippines.
- Datu Piang (Tan Sim Ping, 1846–1933. Ancestry : Amoy, Fujian) recognized as the undisputed Moro leader in Central Mindanao from the end of Spanish rule to the arrival of American forces in late 1899.
- Corazon Aquino (許寰哥; 1933–2009; ancestry: Jiaomei, Fujian), 11th President of the Philippines.
- Rodrigo Duterte (Ancestry from Xiamen, Fujian), 16th President of the Philippines.
- José Rizal (Ancestry from Xiamen, Fujian), Freedom fighter and considered the national hero (pambansang bayani) of the Philippines.
- Román Ongpin. Filipino-Chinese businessman and philanthropist who aided Filipino revolutionaries against the Spanish and American colonial administration in the Philippine islands
- Claudio Teehankee. The 16th Chief Justice of the Supreme Court of the Philippines from 1987 to 1988
- Alfredo "Fred" Lim (林雯洛; 1929–2020). Former police officer, lawyer, politician who serve as a mayor of Manila twice from 1992 to 1998 and from 2007 to 2013 and as a senator from 2004 to 2007.

Thailand

- Chuan Leekpai (呂基文; ancestry: Nan'an City): served two terms as the Prime Minister of Thailand, from 1992 to 1995, and from 1997 to 2001. He is also the former president of the National Assembly of Thailand and speaker of the Thai House of Representatives from 2019 to 2023.
- Khaw Soo Cheang, Governor of Ranong Province, Thailand in 1854 and given the princely title of Phraya Na Ranong by the Thai royal family. He became primogenitor of the Khaw na Ranong family
- Khaw Sim Bee or Phraya Ratsadanupradit Mahitsaraphakdi (許心美; 1857–1913; ancestry: Zhangzhou), the governor of Trang Province in Thailand.
- Kittiratt Na-Ranong or Khaw Cheng Thong (1958), Deputy Prime Minister of Thailand, Aug 2011 – May 2014 and Finance Minister (great-great-grandson of Khaw Soo Cheang)
- Mongkol Na Songkhla: Health Minister of Thailand (2006 - 2008).
- Korn Chatikavanij (1964), Finance Minister of Thailand (2008–2011)

Brunei

- Ong Sum Ping (黄森屏; 14th Century), Conferred the noble title of Pengiran Maharaja Lela (Prince) and elected Chief of Kinabatangan. "Son-in-Law of Sultan Muhammad Shah of Brunei".
- Ong Boon Pang (王文邦, Kinmen County, China) Served as the First Kapitan Cina and a member of the State Council of Brunei.
- Lim Jock Seng (林玉成). Served as Minister of Foreign Affairs & Trade II, Minister at the Prime Minister's office, member of the Privy Council in 2003 and Legislative Council of Brunei in 2004.
- Lim Jock Hoi (林玉輝); A Bruneian politician and diplomat who served as the 14th secretary-general of ASEAN between 2018 and 2022, previously served as the permanent secretary of the Ministry of Foreign Affairs and Trade, Brunei.

Myanmar

- Aung Gyi (陈旺枝), Burmese military officer and politician. He was a cofounder of the National League for Democracy and served as president of the party but left to form a rival party, the Union National Democracy Party. He was the number two in the Union Revolutionary Council set up after the 1962 coup, serving as vice-chief of staff and minister of trade and industry.
- Tan Yu Sai (陳裕才), one of the founding members of the Union Revolutionary Council from 2 March 1962 to 6 October 1970, and also serbved as the Minister for Trade.

Vietnam

- Phan Thanh Giản (潘清簡; 1796–1867; Haicheng, Zhangzhou), the Grand Counsellor of the Nguyễn Dynasty in Vietnam. Negotiator of the Treaty of Ho Chi Minh city.
- Phan Thanh Liêm (潘清簾, 1833 – 1896), Son of Phan Thanh Giản. Vietnamese soldier, politician, nationalist and (anti-French) Vietnam independence activist.

Hong Kong

- Yeoh Eng-kiong OBE, GBS, JP (楊永強, 1946). Malaysian born. Served as Secretary for Health and Welfare 1999 - 2002, Secretary for Health, Welfare and Food and member of the Executive Council 2002 - 2004 in the Hong Kong Government. Professor of Medicine in the Chinese University of Hong Kong.

Canada

- Victor Oh (胡子修), Senator of Ontario
- John Yap (葉志明; 1959), Minister of State for Climate Action of British Columbia in Canada

== Military ==
- Zheng Zhilong (鄭芝龍; 1604–1661), Marquis of Tong'an and Nan'an, political and military leader in the late Ming dynasty who defeated the Dutch during the Battle of Liaoluo Bay
- Shi Lang, (施琅; 1621–1696; Jinjiang, Quanzhou). Commander-in-chief of the Qing fleets which defeated Kingdom of Tungning and conquered Taiwan Island in 1683.
- Hong Chengchou, (洪承疇; 1593–1665; Nan'an, Quanzhou, Fujian) prominent official who served under the Ming and Qing dynasties.
- José Ignacio Paua (刘亨赙, Nan'an, Quanzhou, Fujian) Chinese-Filipino general who joined the Katipunan that spearheaded the 1896 Philippine Revolution against the Spanish Empire. Continued to fight against the Americans during the Philippine–American War.
- Ye Fei (葉飛, Nan'an, Quanzhou) or Sixto Mercado Tiongco was a Philippine-born Chinese military general and politician of the People's Republic of China. Served at various times as Commander-in-Chief of the Chinese Navy, Governor & Communist Party Chief of Fujian Province and Minister of Transport.
- Liang Lingguang (梁灵光, 1916 - 2006, Yongchun County, Fujian). Anti-Japanese Activist, Chief of Staff of the 29th Corps of the People's Liberation Army during Civil War, First Mayor of Xiamen after Liberation, Minister of Light Industry, Governor of Guangdong Province.
- John Lie (Indonesian Navy officer) aka John Lie Tjeng Tjoan, Rear Admiral Jahja Daniel Dharma. (李約翰) A National Hero of Indonesia, was one of the first high-ranking navy commanders during the Indonesian National Revolution.
- Vicente Lim, Filipino brigadier general and World War II hero.
- Huang Sian Teh, (黃善德, Hui'an County) Nationalist Army General (Tiger Division) during World War II, Famous martial artist and Instructor in the postwar Republic of China.
- Cai Yingting (蔡英挺, Jinjiang, Quanzhou), ex-commander of Nanjing Military Region, ex-president of the PLA Academy of Military Science
- Hong Jiangqiang, (洪江强, Longhai, Fujian). lieutenant general (zhongjiang) of the People's Liberation Army, Chief of Staff of Eastern Theater Command

== Arts & Entertainment ==
Actors/Actresses

- Michelle Yeoh (楊紫瓊,Ipoh, Malaysia) - Malaysian actress, best known for performing her own stunts in the Hong Kong action films that brought her to fame in the early 1990s. In 2023, she won the Oscar (Academy Award for Best Actress) for her role in Everything Everywhere All at Once (2022) becoming the first Asian to win the award and the first Malaysian to win an Academy Award in any category.
- Angelica Lee or Lee Sinje (李心潔) Malaysian Actress. Winner of numerous awards : Golden Horse Award - Best Actress, Golden Bauhinia Award - Best Actress, Hong Kong Film Awards – Best Actress and Berlin International Film Awards - New Talent Award etc.
- Yeo Yann Yann (杨雁雁) Malaysian Actress. Winner of numerous awards : 50th Golden Horse Awards - Best Supporting Actress, Vladivostok Film Festival - Best Actress, 8th Asian Film Awards - Best Supporting Actress, 56th Golden Horse Awards - Best Leading Actress etc.
- Ko Chun-hsiung (柯俊雄). Republic of China (Taiwan) Actor. Winner of three Golden Horse Awards, two Asia Pacific Film Festival Awards for Best Actor, a Panama International Film Festival Award for Best Actor.
- Richard Ng Man-tat (吳孟達), Hong Kong Actor, Winner of the Best Supporting Actor award 1990, Hong Kong Film Awards
- Chen Sung-young (陳松勇). Republic of China (Taiwan) Actor. Winner of the Golden Horse Award for Best Actor in 1989
- Sarah Lian (连丽婷), a Chinese Malaysian actress and television personality based in Kuala Lumpur, Malaysia.
- Yao Chen (姚晨), a Chinese actress whom Forbes ranks as the 83rd most powerful woman in the world
- Lim Kay Tong (林祺堂), Singaporean actor
- Sharon Au, former Singaporean actress and host
- Priscelia Chan (曾詩梅), Singaporean television actress
- Tan Kok Hwa (陳國華), Singaporean actor
- Jeanette Aw (欧燕苹), named as one of the Seven Princesses of Mediacorp.
- Edmund Chen (陈之财), Singaporean actor
- Richard Low (刘谦益), Singaporean actor
- Paige Chua (蔡琦慧), Singaporean model and actress
- Baiyu (singer), Chinese-born American singer-songwriter and actress.
- Angelababy
- Kim Chiu (張金珠), Filipino actress and singer of Chinese descent who rose to fame as a first winner of Pinoy Big Brother: Teen Edition in 2006, soldiering on as a multi-awarded actress.

Movie directors

- Tang Xiaodan (汤晓丹; 22 Feb 1910, Hua'an, Zhangzhou), Chinese film director. In 1984, he won the Golden Rooster Award for Best Director.
- Jack Neo (梁志強), Singapore film and television actor, host and director.
- Eric Khoo (邱金海; born 27 March 1965) credited for the revival of Singapore's film industry, youngest son of Khoo Teck Puat.
- Boo Junfeng (巫俊锋, 4 Dec 1983), Singapore filmmaker.

Singers

- Jay Chou (周杰倫, born 18 January 1979 in Linkou District, Taiwan), renowned Taiwanese singer.
- Goh Kiat Chun (Wu Chun) (吳尊; born 10 October 1979 in Brunei; ancestry: Lieyu, Kinmen), actor, singer, model and was a member of Fahrenheit, a Taiwanese Mandopop vocal quartet boy band
- JJ Lin (林俊杰, born 27 March 1981 in Singapore; ancestry: Kinmen), singer, songwriter, record producer, and actor
- Yin Chengzong (殷承宗; born 1941 in Gulangyu, Xiamen), pianist and composer.
- Ma Sicong (馬思聰; 1912–1987; Haifeng county), Chinese violinist and composer
- Dick Lee (李迪文, born 24 August 1956 in Singapore), pop singer, composer and playwright.
- Wu Bai (吳俊霖, born 14 January 1968 in Chiayi, Taiwan), rock singer and songwriter.
- Janet Hsieh (謝怡芬), a Taiwanese-American television personality, violinist, author, and model based in Taipei, Taiwan. She is most well known for playing the Taiwanese Mandarin voiceover of Anna in the movie Frozen.
- Han Kuo-Huang (韩国璜), a Chinese-born American musician.
- Tan Kheng Seong (Ah Niu) (陳慶祥; born 31 August 1976 in Malaysia; ancestry: Nan'an, Quanzhou), Malaysian Chinese singer in Malaysia and Singapore

Media Personalities

- Nigel Ng (Uncle Roger) (黃瑾瑜; born March 15, 1991 in Kuala Lumpur, Malaysia), Malaysian comedian and YouTuber

== Sports ==
- Rudy Hartono Kurniawan (梁海量), born Nio Hap Liang in Surabaya, Indonesia. Badminton player who won the men's singles title at the prestigious All-England Championship eight times, seven times consecutively (1968–1974) and at World Championship in 1980. Widely acclaimed as the greatest badminton player of all time.
- Utami Kinard (Sister of Rudy Hartono) Indonesian badminton player, Gold medal winner of the 1971 Asian Games Women's Singles and 1975 Uber Cup (World Women's Team Championship) team event.
- Njoo Kiem Bie (naturalized name Koesbianto, 楊金美, 1927–2008). Indonesian badminton player, member of the team that won the prestigious Thomas Cup (world men's team title) for Indonesia for the first time, as a doubles player in the 1958 series in Singapore, and helping to defend that title in 1961 in Jakarta.
- Susi Susanti (Ong Lien Hiang,王蓮香). Indonesian badminton player, Winner of multiple gold medals - 1992 Olympic Games, 1993 World Championships, World Cup, Uber Cup etc.
- Maria Fransisca or (Tjan So Gwan; 曾素光). Indonesian badminton player who won multiple gold medals in the World Masters Games, World Senior Championships and Southeast Asian Games.
- Ivana Lie Ing Hoa (李英華). Indonesian badminton player who won gold medals in the World Cup, Asian Games and the Southeast Asian games.
- Hiong Liong Tan or Tan Hoan Liong or H.L Tan (陈香良, 1938–2009). He was the first Indonesian and one of the first Asian chess players to hold the International Master (IM) title.
- Huang Dongping (黄东萍; Nan'an, Fujian, China) Chinese badminton player. Gold medal winner- mixed doubles Olympic Champion at the 2020 Summer Olympics, 2012 World Junior Championship and three-times mixed doubles Asian Champion.
- Yang Liwan, (Shishi, Quanzhou, China) Chinese Multiple Paralympic and World Championship Gold medals winner for shot put and javelin.
- Tan Cheong Min (陈昌敏). Malaysian Wushu athlete. Gold medals winner of 2025 World Wushu Championships(Brasília), 2025 World games(Chengdu), World Cup - (Yangon 2018) & (Yokohama 2024), World Combat Games (Riyadh 2023), World Championships (Kazan 2017) & (Shanghai 2019)
- Lee Chong Wei (李宗偉), Malaysian badminton player. No.1 World ranking Badminton player for a total of 349 weeks, including a 199-week streak from 21 August 2008 to 14 June 2012.
- Tan Boon Heong, (陈文宏) Malaysian badminton player (Doubles). Ranked World No.1 doubles player in 2007. Won multiple gold medals in the doubles events of the World junior Championships, Commonwealth Games and Asian Games.
- Koo Kien Keat (古健傑). Malaysian badminton player (Doubles). Ranked World No 1 doubles player in 2007. Gold Medals winner in Commonwealth Games, Asian Games, SEA Games, Asian Junior Championships and All England Superseries.
- Goh Jin Wei, (吴堇溦). Malaysian badminton player. Gold medalist (girls' singles) at the 2015 and 2018 BWF World Junior Championships, 2018 Youth Olympics and 2017 Southeast Asian Games.
- Soh Wooi Yik, (蘇偉譯). Malaysian badminton player (Doubles). A world champion, an Asian champion and a doubles bronze medalist at the Olympic Games
- Pearly Tan Koong Le (陳康樂). Malaysian badminton player. Women's doubles and mixed doubles gold medalist in the 2022 Commonwealth Games (Birmingham)
- Toh Ee Wei (杜頤溈). Malaysian badminton player. Won the mixed doubles title at the 2025 World Championships in Paris.
- Hoon Thien How (云天豪). Malaysian badminton player (Doubles). Gold medals winner of World Junior Championships and Commonwealth Youth Games.
- Ong Poh Lim (王保林). Malayan Sarawakian badminton player. Invented the backhand flick serve known as the “Crocodile Serve”. Gold medals winner of Thomas Cups and All England Championship.
- Yeoh Li Tian (杨理天), Malaysian Chess player. First Malaysian to achieve the title Chess Grandmaster (GM).
- Ang Peng Siong (洪秉祥), Singapore swimmer, who once held World Number 1 ranking in the 50 m freestyle. Gold medalist 100 m freestyle, Asian Games 1982 New Delhi

.

== Religion ==
- Master Qingshui (清水祖師; 1047–1101; ancestry: Yongchun, Quanzhou), formerly known as Chen Zhaoyin (陳昭應), famous Chan Buddhist monk during the Northern Song dynasty and was eventually worship as Chinese Deity in Southern Fujian, Taiwan and among Hokkien-speaking Chinese diaspora communities
- Venerable Zhuan Dao (轉道法師; 1871–1943), Singapore Buddhist leader and Founder of the KMSPKS
- Buddhādasa Bhikkhu (佛使比丘; 1906–1993), Prominent Thai Buddhist Reformer, and influential Thai ascetic-philosopher of the 20th century.
- Venerable Hong Choon (宏船法師; 1907–1990; ancestry: Jinjiang, Quanzhou), Singapore Buddhist leader and 2nd president of SBF
- Stephen Tong (唐崇榮; born in Xiamen), Indonesian Christian pastor and founder of Indonesian Reformed Evangelical Church
- Jaime Sin (辛海梅, 辛海棉), 30th Roman Catholic Archbishop of Manila and the third cardinal from the Philippines. He was instrumental in the historic and peaceful 1986 People Power Revolution which toppled the dictatorship and martial law under the despotic Ferdinand Marcos.
