= Long Gen =

- Title: Venerable Long Gen

Personal life
- Born: 1921
- Died: 15 June 2011 (aged 89–90)

Religious life
- Religion: Buddhism

Venerable Long Gen (Chinese: 隆根长老) (1921–2011) was a key monastic figure in the Singapore Buddhist community.

== Early life ==
Venerable Long Gen, a revered figure in the realm of Chinese Buddhism, was born in the Jiangsu province of China in the year 1921. His spiritual journey began with becoming a Buddhist novice at the age of 10. At the age of 22 he underwent formal ordination, marking the commencement of his lifelong dedication to Buddhism, including a commitment to monastic life.

In 1949, amidst the Communist Revolution and establishment of the People's Republic of China, Venerable Long Gen decided to leave his hometown of Wuchang. Driven by his faith, he embarked on a journey that included the southern Chinese cities of Guangzhou and Hong Kong. In 1956, Venerable Long Gen visited Taiwan.

== Achievements in South East Asia ==
When Ven Long Gen was in Penang, Malaysia in 1960 propagating Buddhism, he also began the publication of Buddhist literature in Malaysia and Singapore. In 1964, Venerable Long Gen stayed settled down in Singapore, gradually relocating the Nanyang Buddhist Bookstore from Penang to Singapore. In November 1973, Venerable Long Gen was appointed as the Abbot of Leng Foong Prajna Temple. He also participated in the Singapore Buddhist Federation since 1984 before taking on the leadership of the Singapore Buddhist Federation (SBF) in July 1994. During his years as a SBF, he promoted traditional Buddhist orthodox practices, including regarding the dress code for the Buddhist monastic community (sangha). He died in 2011 at the age of 91.

== See also ==
- Venerable Zhuan Dao
- Venerable Hong Choon
- Buddhism in Singapore
