= Kwan Yin Chan Lin =

Singaporean and Malaysian Buddhist zen centre

- Kwan Yin Chan Lin
- Interactive map of Kwan Yin Chan Lin

Monastery information
- Full name: Kwan Yin Chan Lin Zen Meditation Centre
- Order: Mahayana Kwan Um School of Zen
- Established: 1991

People
- Founder: Venerable Chi Boon

Site
- Location: 21 Lorong 25 Geylang, Singapore
- Coordinates: 1.3143°N 103.8825°E
- Public access: yes
- Website: kyclzen.sg

Kwan Yin Chan Lin Zen Meditation Centre (KYCL) (Chinese: 観音禪林) is a Buddhist zen centre in Singapore and Malaysia. The organization was set up by Venerable Chi Boon (釋繼聞法師) in 1991. The present KYCL centres are located at Geylang, Singapore, KYCL International Zen Centre at Pengerang, Desaru and Fu Hui Yuan at Muar (inaugurated in 2018) in Johor, Malaysia.

== Overview ==
Kwan Yin Chan Lin Zen Meditation Centre was founded in 1991 by Venerable Chi Boon with Venerable Chuk Mor (竺摩長老), Seung Sahn Dae Soen Sa Nim (崇山大禪師) and Harada Tangen Roshi (原田湛玄禪師) being the spiritual teacher. Venerable Chi Boon received the ‘inka’ as Zen Guiding Teacher or Ji Do Bop Sa (指導法師) on 8 November 1998 from Seung Sahn, as an acknowledgment of accomplishment in Zen practice and authorization in teaching Kwan Um School of Zen's teaching style.. KYCL is the only Korean Buddhism Kong-an Zen practice (公案禪) monastery or centre in Singapore.

== Events ==
Regular events at the centre include:

- Kong-an Zen Group Practice
- Sutra Chanting and Repentance Ceremony
- Dharma Talks and Sharing
- Traditional Chinese Medical Free Clinic Service
- Youth Club
- Children Classes.

== See also ==
- Buddhism in Singapore
- Kwan Um School of Zen
- Korean Buddhism
