= Low Kim Pong =

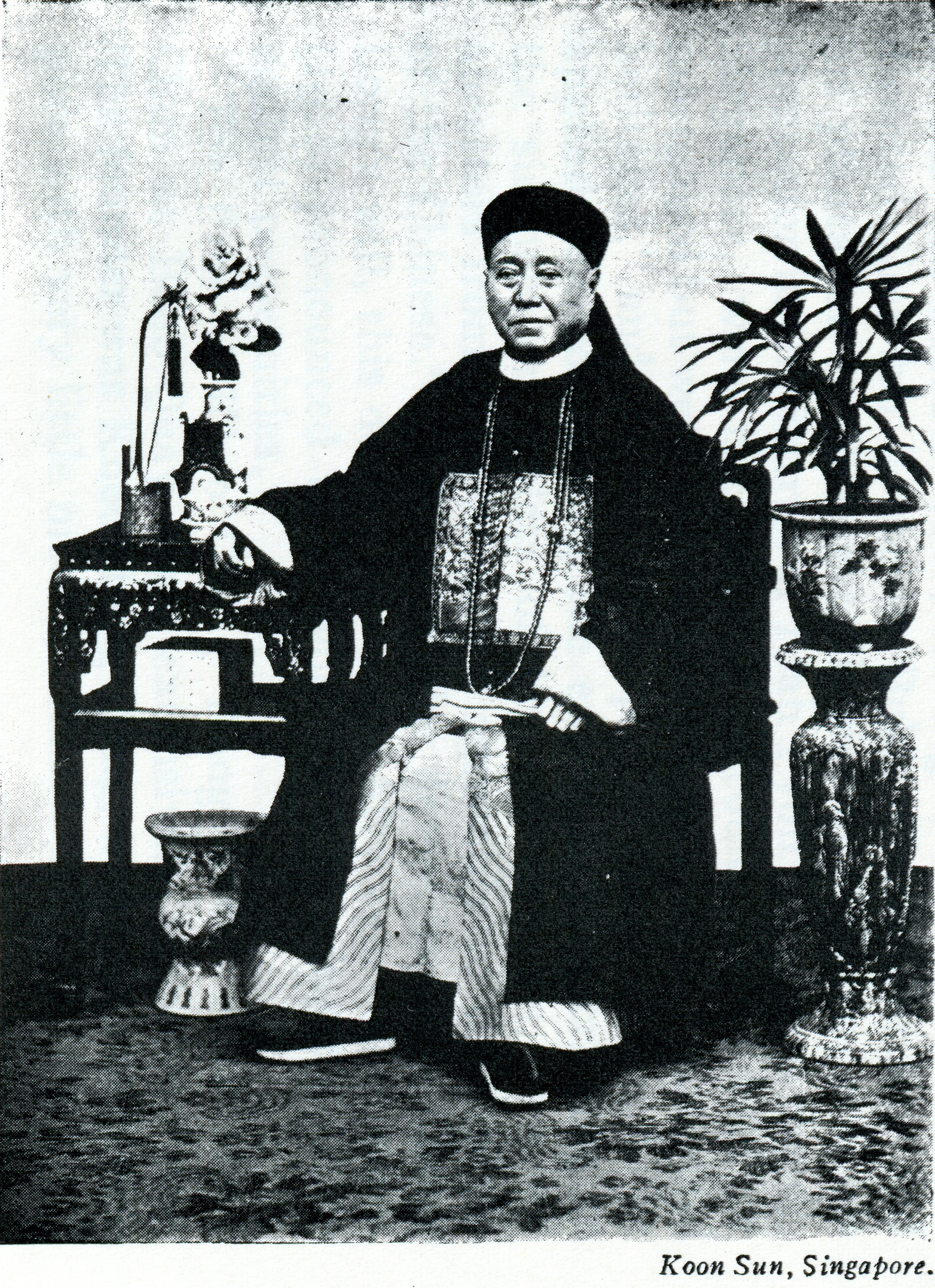
- Born: November 29, 1837; Zhangzhou, Fujian, (Qing dynasty) Qing empire
- Died: December 18, 1909 (aged 72); Singapore, Straits Settlements, British Malaya

Low Kim Pong (Simplified Chinese: 刘金榜; Traditional Chinese: 劉金榜) (29 November 1837 - 18 December 1909), was a prominent Chinese trader in Singapore. He was a leader of the Hokkien community in Singapore.

== Biography ==
Low was born on 29 November 1837 in Zhangzhou, Fujian. He came to Singapore in 1858 as a general trader, and founded Chop Ban San, a medical store, after meeting with success. Chop Ban San later became one of the largest Chinese druggist stores in Singapore. He also established a private banking business, as well as Chop Hock Nam, another medical store.

In 1898, both he and his son had an unusual dream of a golden man arriving from the west. He then met Venerable Xian Hui, who was returning to Fujian after a six-year pilgrimage in Sri Lanka. Low believed that Xian Hui was the man he encountered in his dream, and persuaded him to stay in Singapore. He and Yeo Poon Seng raised the funds to construct the first Chinese Buddhist temple in Singapore known as Siong Lim Temple on Kim Keat Road, which was completed in 1906, and Xian Hui became the temple's first abbot.

In 1906, he and several fellow prominent members of the Chinese community in Singapore founded the General Chinese Trade Affairs Association (later known as Singapore Chinese Chamber of Commerce). He was later appointed director of the chamber, as well as the Singapore Hokkien Huay Kuan. He was also a member of the Singapore Po Leung Kuk and the Chinese Advisory Board.

== Personal life ==
Low had a wife, two sons, three daughters, and twenty grandchildren. He lived on 99 Devonshire Road. He had donated to the Victoria Memorial Hall, and the Straits Medical School. For his seventieth birthday, an evening party was held to celebrate the event and over one hundred Europeans attended. A wayang was performed at his residence for his seventy-second birthday in 1909.

Low died on 18 December 1909. As he did not leave a will, multiple people claimed to be his next of kin in order to inherit his estate as he owned a large amount of property.

Kim Pong Road was named in honour of him.
