= Kong Meng San Phor Kark See Monastery =

Largest Buddhist temple in Singapore

- 光明山普觉禅寺
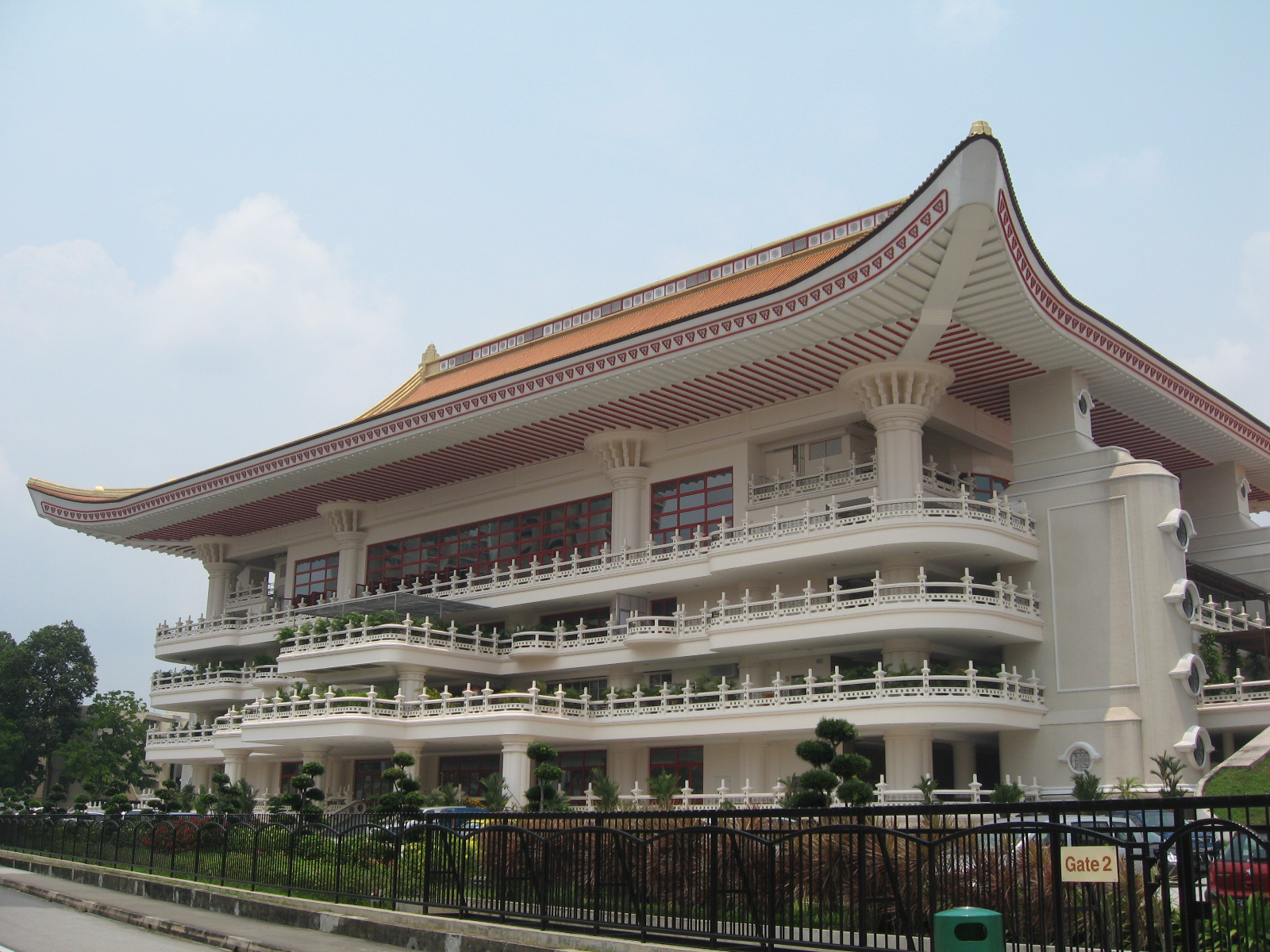
- The Venerable Hong Choon Memorial Hall of the temple

- Location within Singapore

Monastery information
- Full name: Kong Meng San Phor Kark See Monastery
- Order: Mahayana
- Established: 1920

People
- Founder: Zhuan Dao
- Abbot: Kwang Sheng
- Important associated figures: Hong Choon, Long Gen, Yan Pei, Sui Kim

Site
- Location: Bishan, Singapore
- Coordinates: 1°21′41.04″N 103°50′9.6″E
- Public access: yes
- Website: kmspks.org

The Kong Meng San Phor Kark See Monastery (KMSPKS), more popularly known as Bright Hill Temple, (simplified Chinese: 光明山普觉禅寺; traditional Chinese: 光明山普覺禪寺; pinyin: Guāngmíng Shān Pǔjué Chán Sì; Pe̍h-ōe-jī: Kong-bîng-san-phóo-kak-sī), is a Buddhist temple and monastery located along 88 Bright Hill Road in Bishan, Singapore.

It was built in 1921 by Venerable Zhuan Dao to propagate Buddhism and provide lodging for monks. It is the largest Mahayana Buddhist temple in Singapore and in 2006 became the parent organization of the Buddhist College of Singapore. It also operates one of Singapore's's two private crematoria, alongside Tse Toh Aum Temple (Bright Hill Cremation and Columbarium).

== History ==
The temple was founded between 1920 and 1921 by Venerable Zhuan Dao as the Phor Kark See Temple on land in Thomson Road donated by Tay Woo Seng, a Chinese businessman. It was the first traditional Chinese monastery built in Singapore. Since Phor Kark See Monastery is situated at Kong Meng San ("Bright Hill", formerly "Hai Nan Mountain"), it has come to be known as "Kong Meng San Phor Kark See Monastery." The original temple consisted of a two-storey building, a shrine room, a visitors' room and living quarters. The Monastery expanded over time as philanthropists, including Aw Boon Haw and Aw Boon Par, donated funds.

In 1947, Venerable Hong Choon became the monastery's Chief Abbot, after the death of Venerable Zhuan Dao. Under his leadership, the monastery complex expanded from two shrine halls to include the Pagoda of 10,000 Buddhas and prayer halls with a total area as large as ten football fields. He also developed the monastery as a place of practice.

In 1983, with a S$5.3 million donation from followers of Venerable Seck Hong Choon, the monastery officially opened Evergreen Bright Hill Home, a non-profit nursing home in Singapore providing care for elderly individuals, regardless of race, language, or religion.

Venerable Seck Hong Choon died on 25 December 1990, and Venerable Yen Pei was appointed the Chief Abbot in 1991. Venerable Long Gen succeeded him in 1994, followed by Venerable Sui Kim.

On 15 January 2002, the temple announced a Compassion Fund to provide financial assistance to retrenched workers with a last drawn pay of up to S$2,500, and who do not qualify for other aid.

On 5 June 2004, Venerable Kwang Sheng became the monastery's present abbot. Under Kwang Sheng's leadership, the Dharma Propagation Division was set up to facilitate the study and practice of Dharma for Singaporeans. The Youth Ministry, KMSPKS Youth, was set up to serve as a platform for Singaporean youths seeking to learn about Buddhism and serve society via Buddhist teachings.

On 13 September 2006, Kong Meng San Phor Kark See Monastery opened the Buddhist College of Singapore. As the country's first Buddhist college, it offers a four-year bachelor's degree in Buddhism. Lessons were held on temple grounds until a new S$35 million five-storey building was completed.

In May 2007, Kwang Sheng released a musical album titled Buddha Smiles. In October 2007, the temple was one of seven religious groups ordered by the Commissioner of Charities (COC) to open their books to auditors. With an annual income of S$14.95 million, it had one of the largest incomes among the charities under the COC's direct purview. Its main income sources were crematorium and columbarium services, prayer services, and donations. Between November 2007 and June 2008, the monastery reportedly gave roughly 200 people free meals daily, clarifying their prayer and meditation practices.

On 21 June 2008, the temple raised over S$1 million for the reconstruction of schools devastated in the 12 May Sichuan earthquake, by organizing the Great Compassion; Great Aspiration Charity Show.

In April 2009, the temple launched Gum, an English-language magazine, to bridge the gap between their older Hokkien-speaking devotees and English-speaking youth. The magazine title is a transliteration of a Hokkien term meaning "to get along" and symbolizes unity within the congregation. In March 2009, local filmmaker Royston Tan established a new production house, Chuan Pictures, to collaborate with the temple on a 15-minute Mandarin short film, "Little Note." It premiered in September 2009 and focuses on a single mother who gave her son inspirational notes.

In December 2014, KMSPKS Youth led their first overseas humanitarian mission into Chiang Mai, Thailand.

== Monastery facilities ==
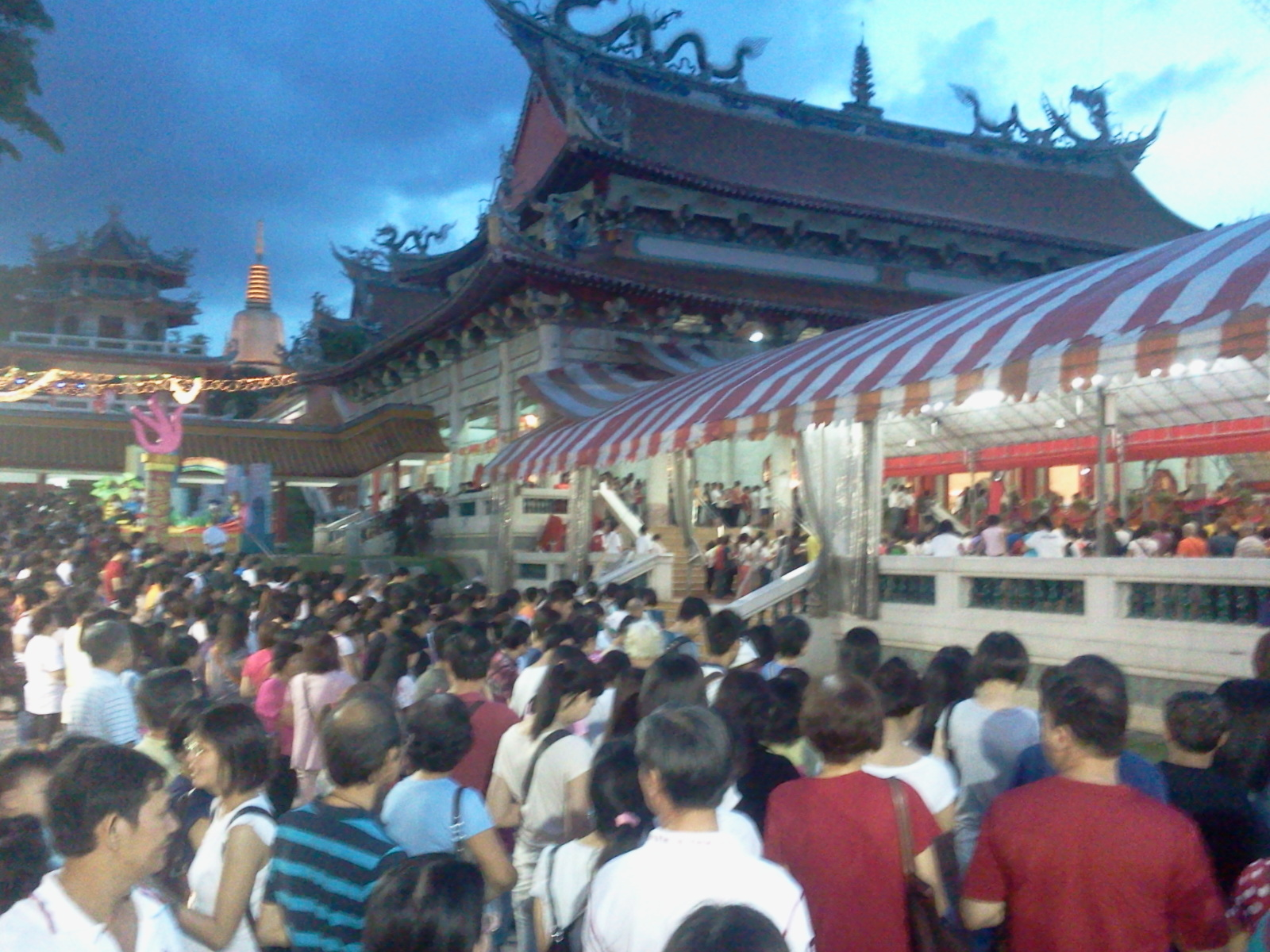
Vesak celebrations at Kong Meng San Phor Kark See

The monastery premises contain stupas, prayer halls, a crematorium and columbarium which houses over 200,000 niches, bell and drum towers, and an outdoor statue of Guanyin (Avalokiteśvara) that stands between the Dharma Hall and the Pagoda of 10,000 Buddhas. The Hong Choon Memorial Hall of the temple was built in 2004.

The large bronze Buddha statue located in the temple's Hall of No Form is one of Asia's largest Buddha statues, with a height of 13.8 meters and weighing 55 tons.

In 2014, a S$12 million four-story carpark with about 200 spaces was added.

A new four-storey, S$1 million eco-friendly burner was installed in 2014 to improve air quality problems during Qingming Festival.

=== Bodhi tree ===
Another notable feature of the monastery is a Bodhi tree, a sapling brought from the sacred Bodhi tree at Anuradhapura, Sri Lanka. This tree at Anuradhapura was brought as a sapling from the sacred Bodhi tree of Bodh Gaya, India, where Shakyamuni Buddha was said to have attained enlightenment.

== Buddhist College of Singapore ==
Kong Meng San Phor Kark See Monastery opened the Buddhist College of Singapore on 13 September 2006. As the country's Buddhist college, it offers a four-year bachelor's degree in Buddhism.

The building was supposed to be completed in 2015, but was delayed due to poor weather and manpower issues. Lessons were held on temple grounds until the $35 million five-storey building was completed in 2016 and opened by Prime Minister Lee Hsien Loong on 10 September 2016.

In 2014, the college announced intentions of accepting female monastics, with the new nunnery campus housed at Poh Ern Shih Temple, taking in 45 students every two years.

== Events ==
The monastery celebrates Vesak Day annually with ceremonies such as "Bathing the Buddha" and "Three-Steps-One-Bow". Other major events include the Qingming Festival.

== See also ==
- Buddhism in Singapore
- List of Buddhist temples in Singapore
- Singapore Buddhist Lodge
- Kek Lok Si, Penang
