= Hai Inn Temple =

Buddhist monastery in Singapore

Coordinates: 1.37607°N 103.73442°E

- Interactive map of Hai Inn Temple

Monastery information
- Order: Mahayana
- Established: 1928

People
- Founder: Tan Fang Swee

Site
- Location: 33 Brickland Road, Singapore 688254
- Website: www.haiinn.org/home.php

Hai Inn Temple (Chinese: 海印古寺), is a Buddhist monastery in Singapore. The present premises are located at Brickland Road in Tengah, Singapore.

== Overview ==
Hai Inn Temple was founded in 1928 and is one of the oldest Buddhist temples in Singapore. Regular activities include dharma classes and monthly chanting sessions. The temple has one of the biggest bells of its kind in Singapore, weighing 7 tonnes, with a height of 2.75 metres and 1.7 metres wide.

== See also ==
- Buddhism in Singapore
