= Karma Kagyud Buddhist Centre =

Tibetan Buddhism Vajrayana centers in Singapore

Religion
- Affiliation: Tibetan Buddhism
- Sect: Karma Kagyu
- Leadership: Shangpa Rinpoche

Location
- Location: Geylang, Singapore
- Country: Singapore

Architecture
- Founder: Rangjung Rigpe Dorje, 16th Karmapa Shamarpa, David Chee Kim Swee
- Established: 1981

Karma Kagyud Buddhist Centre (Chinese: 噶玛迦如佛教中心) is a Buddhist institution in Singapore, established in 1981 by the 16th Gyalwa Karmapa.

== History ==
Karma Kagyud Buddhist Centre was first initiated in 1979, after Kunzig Shamar Rinpoche visited Singapore he advised Mr David Chee Kim Swee and a group of devotees to set up a Buddhist Centre named Karma Kagyud Buddhist Centre (KKBC). A bungalow at No. 17 Jalan Lateh was rented for this purpose.

On 17 April 1981, the Registrar of Societies approved the registration of the centre.

The 16th Gyalwa Karmapa Rangjung Rigpe Dorje visited Singapore from 27 December to 5 January 1981. He gave his blessings for the successful Dharma propagation of the Centre and assured Mr David Chee that he would send a qualified teacher as an advisor to the centre. He conducted the Black Hat ceremony and left a pair of his shoes at KKBC, signifying his return in future.

The first management committee was formed on 11 March 1982. Upon Shamar Rinpoche's request, Shangpa Rinpoche accepted the offer to become the religious advisor of KKBC.

== See also ==
- Buddhism in Singapore
