= Foo Hai Ch'an Monastery =

Buddhist monastery in Singapore

Coordinates: 1.3179°N 103.8885°E

- Location within Singapore

Monastery information
- Order: Mahayana
- Established: 1935

People
- Founder: Venerable Hong Zong
- Abbot: Shi Ming Yi

Site
- Location: Geylang, Singapore
- Public access: yes
- Website: www.foohai.org

Foo Hai Ch'an Monastery (Chinese: 福海禪寺), is a Buddhist monastery in Singapore. The monastery was set up by Venerable Hong Zong of Taiwan and the current abbot is Venerable Shi Ming Yi. The present premises are located at Geylang East Avenue 2, Singapore.

== History ==
Foo Hai Ch'an Monastery was founded in 1935 by Taiwan-born Japan-ordained Venerable Hong Zong who came to popularise Buddhism in Singapore. He was succeeded by Venerable Miao Shou in 1975. The monastery founded the present day Ren Ci Hospital and Medicare Centre at Novena.

In September 1998, the hospital established its affiliate, Ren Ci Day Care Centre for the Elderly.

In 1999, Foo Hai Ch'an Monastery took over the management of 270 beds in 11 single-storey wards which were formerly part of Tan Tock Seng Hospital. It organised fund raising activities such as concerts given by Andy Lau, Liza Wang, Adam Cheng, Roman Tam, and Frances Yip who performed for free.

After its abbot Shi Ming Yi was released from prison, he resumed his abbotship at the monastery and instituted a system of checks evaluating requests for financial assistance. He was however no longer the temple's charity trustee and president.

== Monastery ==
Built in Chan/Zen-style, the Monastery has several structures, statues, Bodhi tree and Buddha relics that are of religious importance and of interest to tourists.

=== Heng Ha Dharmapala Entrance ===
The main entrance of the Monastery has two vajra warriors, also known as Generals Heng and Ha. After the Chinese adoption of Buddhism, under the influence of Taoism and folk religions, where even numbers are considered sacred, two larger-than-life Dharmapala protectors, Heng and Ha, made from metal, are traditionally installed on the main entrance of the monastery.

=== Bell and Drum Towers ===
Inside the boundary wall from the main entrance are two towers, one each on the north and south corners of the platform housing the main monastery building, a Bell gong tower to the north side and drum tower to the south side. In the morning, the gong is played 108 times, descending from louder to gentler sound, to announce the end of the night and to awaken from deep unconscious. In the evening, the gong is played 108 times, ascending from gentler to louder sound. The sounds are played to remind listeners of illusions.

=== Main Monastery Building ===
The multi-storey main monastery building has a large airy 15 m-high prayer hall in the front, which houses a 4-storey-high reception, office, administration, auditorium, meeting rooms and toilets at the back. The main hall houses a 3.3-meter-tall (11 ft) statue of Buddha and a 9.9-meter-tall (32 ft) statue of Guanyin.

==== Foo Hai Ch'an Guanyin ====
Inside the main large prayer hall, there is a 9.9-meter-tall (32 ft) statue of the Thousand-armed manifestation of the bodhisattva Guanyin, who is the Chinese manifestation of the bodhisattva Avalokitesvara. There is a large altar in front of the deity, several ornate statues in the roof, and several rows for praying.

=== Buddha relics at Foo Hai Ch'an Pagoda ===
A five-story high pagoda, built in 2004 by the Siddhartha centre which donated Sg$6 million to Foo Hai Ch'an in 2004, lies in the central north direction. Each floor houses decorated statutes of Buddha in various styles; the top floor houses the sacred Buddha relics.

Following temples in Singapore have the relics associated with Buddha:

- Buddha Tooth Relic Temple and Museum in Little China
- Foo Hai Ch'an Monastery
- Kong Meng San Phor Kark See Monastery in Bishan
- Thekchen Choling at Jalan Besar
- Sri Lankaramaya Buddhist Temple at St. Michael’s Road in Bandemeer

=== Guest House and Teaching Centre ===
Inside the main entrance, to the immediate right side, there is a five-storey above-ground teaching centre, library and guest house building with toilets.

=== Singapore Bodhi Tree ===
Singapore Bodhi Tree is a sacred Bodhi Tree, between the main monastery building and pagoda. It is a gift given to the monastery by the then visiting president of Sri Lanka. It comes from the cutting of Jaya Sri Maha Bodhi tree (planted at Anuradhapura in 288 BC, by king Ashoka's eldest daughter Sangamitta) after taking a sapling cutting from the original UNESCO World Heritage Site Bodhi Tree at Bodh Gaya in India under which Buddha attained the enlightenment.

=== Foo Hai Ch'an Columbarium ===
Foo Hai Ch'an Columbarium, housing urns containing ashes of cremated deceased people, lies in the basement under the pagoda and guest house building.

=== Bodhi tree ===
Foo Hai Ch'an Monastery, houses a revered Bodhi tree propagated from a branch of the Indian Bodh Gaya Bodhi Tree. The sacred Bodhi tree at Foo Hai Ch'an Monastery, from sacred saplings gifted from Sri Lanka's historic Jaya Sri Maha Bodhi lineage, during an official state visit by a President of Sri Lanka.

== Incident ==
In 2007, the abbot, Shi Ming Yi, was investigated for misappropriating funds and giving false information. He was subsequently convicted in 2009 and imprisoned in 2010 after his appeal failed. The Commissioner of Charities suspended him from decision-making positions in Foo Hai Ch'an Monastery and other related organisations.

== See also ==
- Buddhism in Singapore
