= Tzu Chi Singapore =

Humanitarian organization

Tzu Chi Singapore, also the Buddhist Compassion Relief Tzu Chi Foundation (Singapore) (Chinese: 佛教慈济慈善事业基金会（新加坡）), is the Singapore branch of the Tzu Chi Buddhist organisation. The foundation was originally set up by Venerable Cheng Yen and based in Hualien, Taiwan. The present premises of the Singapore branch is located at Elias Road in Pasir Ris, Singapore.

== Overview ==
Tzu Chi Singapore was founded in September 1993 advocating several Buddhist and humanitarian causes within Singapore. Some regular activities being offered and provided in Singapore include free clinics, health checkups and monthly recycling at specific hotspots. A localized journal is also published on a monthly basis by the organization. Tzu Chi members are recognisable via their navy blue collared shirts with white pants. The charity is also represented in local tertiary institutions - also known as the Tzu Chi Collegiate Association Singapore - with youth members typically donning lighter blue collared shirts.

In March 2024, Tzu Chi Singapore established its first Dialysis Centre in Buangkok, providing dialysis services to nearly 100 kidney patients each week.

== See also ==
- Buddhism in Singapore
- DAAI Mandarin
