= Kwang Sheng =

BBM Sik Kwang Sheng
- 释广声
- Title: Abbot

Personal life
- Education: Victoria School

Religious life
- Religion: Buddhism
- School: Mahayana

Senior posting
- Teacher: Hong Choon
- Based in: Kong Meng San Phor Kark See Monastery

Sik Kwang Sheng BBM (Chinese: 释广声) is the current vice president of the Singapore Buddhist Federation, the abbot of Kong Meng San Phor Kark See Monastery, and the founder of the Buddhist College of Singapore.

== Early life ==
Kwang Sheng was educated in Victoria School. He was ordained as a monk in 1980 and became a disciple of Ven Hong Choon.

== Career ==
=== Religion ===
Kwang Sheng has served as the president of the Singapore Buddhist Federation since 2006, and became the sixth abbot of Kong Meng San Phor Kark See Monastery in 2004. He has been the chief administrator of the KMSPKS since 1995 and established the Buddhist College of Singapore in 2005. His previous roles include serving as the president of the Inter-Religious Organization in Singapore and as the chairman of the management committees for Maha Bodhi School, Manjursri Secondary School Manjusri Secondary School, and Mee Toh School. He also holds positions at organizations such as the Singapore Buddhist Free Clinic and chairman of Bright Hill Evergreen Home, which is named after Kong Meng San Phor Kark See Monastery.

Kwang Sheng is also a Buddhist musician and has co-produced several albums such as Reverence, Buddha Smiles, Collection of Buddhist Songs and Om Mani Padme Hum.

=== Politics ===
In July 2015, Singapore’s 7th President, Tony Tan, appointed Kwang Sheng as a member of the Presidential Council for Minority Rights. He was subsequently reappointed in July 2021 by the 8th President, Halimah Yacob, to continue his service. In July 2024, the 9th President, Tharman Shanmugaratnam, reappointed him once again to the council.

== Philanthropy ==
In 2014, Kwang Sheng became the first non-Muslim religious leader in Singapore to make a donation to the Aid to Syrian Refugees in Turkey (Asrit) initiative.

== Honors ==
Kwang Sheng was awarded an honorary doctorate degree in educational administration on 1 May 2011 by Mahachulalongkornrajavidyalaya University of Thailand In recognition of his contributions to Buddhism.

In August 2018, the Singapore government awarded Kwang Sheng the Bintang Bakti Masyarakat (Public Service Star) in recognition of his “concern for the education of the younger generation and his efforts in nurturing future pillars of society.”
