= Buddha of Medicine Welfare Society =

Buddhist monastery in Singapore

- Buddha of Medicine Welfare Society

Monastery information
- Order: Mahayana
- Established: 1995

People
- Founders: Venerable Neng Du, Venerable Jing Cong

Site
- Location: 11 Lorong 25 Geylang, Singapore
- Website: bmws.org.sg

Buddha of Medicine Welfare Society (traditional Chinese: 藥師行願會; simplified Chinese: 药师行愿会), is a Buddhist monastery in Singapore. The society was originally set up by Venerable Neng Du. The present premises are located at Geylang, Singapore.

== Overview ==
Buddha of Medicine Welfare Society was initiated in 1991 and approved as a non-profit in Singapore in June 1995. The current resident teacher as of 2013 is Venerable Neng Du. Politician Lee Bee Wah was appointed as the honorary advisor of the monastery in the 2010s.

== See also ==
- Buddhism in Singapore
