= Vimalakirti Buddhist Centre =

Buddhist organisation in Singapore

- Interactive map of Vimalakirti Buddhist Centre

Monastery information
- Order: Mahayana
- Established: 1961

People
- Founder: Wen Ming Hu

Site
- Location: Geylang, Singapore
- Coordinates: 1.3149°N 103.8849°E
- Public access: yes
- Website: www.vbc.org.sg

Vimalakirti Buddhist Centre (Chinese: 净名佛学社), formerly known as Cheng Beng Buddhist Society, is a Buddhist monastery in Singapore. The foundation was originally set up by Venerable Wen Ming Hu. The centre is located at Geylang, Singapore.

== History ==
Cheng Beng Buddhist Society was founded as Singapore Buddhist Youth Group in 1961 by Wen Ming Hu and other lay Buddhists, and was renamed under its present name in 1962 when it was also relocated at an address offered by Chen Lu Niang. The society was named after the Buddhist bodhisattva Vimalakirti, a householder devotee of the ancient Shakyamuni Buddha.

Building expansion took place from 2002 onwards which saw a six-story building completed.

On 4 March 2012, the present day name of Vimalakirti Buddhist Centre was adopted.

Occasional Buddhist workshops and services catering towards the lay Buddhist community are offered on its premises. The centre also hosts the Cakkavala Meditation Centre.

== See also ==
- Buddhism in Singapore
