= Xie Hua'an =

Chinese botanist

- 谢华安
- Born: August 16, 1941 (age 85); Longyan County, Fujian, China
- Education: Longyan Agricultural School; Fujian Agricultural University
- Scientific career
- Fields: Hybrid rice
- Workplaces: Fujian Academy of Agricultural Sciences

Chinese name
- Simplified Chinese: 谢华安
- Traditional Chinese: 謝華安
Transcriptions
Standard Mandarin
- Hanyu Pinyin: Xiè Huá'ān
Southern Min
- Hokkien POJ: Chiā Hôa-an

Xie Hua'an (Chinese: 謝華安; Pe̍h-ōe-jī: Chiā Hôa-an; born 16 August 1941) is a Chinese agronomist best known for developing the hybrid rice "Shan-You 63". He is an academician of the Chinese Academy of Sciences. He is a member of the Chinese Communist Party. He was a delegate to the 8th and 11th National People's Congress. He was a member of the 9th and 10th National Committee of the Chinese People's Political Consultative Conference.

== Biography ==
Xie was born into a family of farming background in Longyan County (now Xinluo District, Longyan), Fujian, on August 16, 1941. Both his younger brothers died of illness. After graduating from Longyan Agricultural School, he taught at Yong'an County. In the early 1960s, he pursued advanced studies at Fujian Agricultural University. After graduation, in 1964, he taught biology at Yong'an Agricultural Vocational Middle School. During the Cultural Revolution, he forced to work in the May Seventh Cadre School. In the winter of 1972, he was transferred to Sanming Institute of Agricultural Sciences and was sent to Hainan to participate in the research of hybrid rice. In the winter of 1980, he bred the plant line "Ming-Hui 63" with strong blast resistance, strong restoring ability and high combining ability, which is the parent with the largest genetic contribution in the breeding of hybrid rice restorer line, and also the restorer line with the widest application and the longest lasting application in the combination preparation of hybrid rice in China in the 20th century. In the winter of 1980, he cultivated the hybrid rice "Shan-You 63", which was widely cultivated in China. With the advantages of high yield, disease resistance, excellent rice quality and wide adaptability, it became the most widely planted hybrid rice seed in China and ranked first in 16 years in succession. It is the best rice variety in China with the longest extension time, the largest application area and the most significant yield increase. He was promoted to associate researcher in 1987 and to researcher in 1992. In 1996, he was appointed president of Fujian Academy of Agricultural Sciences, a position he held until 2006. In 2008, he became a torchbearer of 2008 Summer Olympics. In 2016, he became a member of the National Committee for the Safety of Agricultural Genetically Modified Organisms.

== Honors and awards ==
- 1988 State Science and Technology Progress Award (First Class) for developing the hybrid rice "Shan-You 63"
- 2003 Science and Technology Progress Award of the Ho Leung Ho Lee Foundation
- 2007 Member of the Chinese Academy of Sciences (CAS)
