= Huang Sian Teh =

Taiwanese general

Huang Sian Teh (Chinese: 黃善德; pinyin: Huáng Shàndé; Pe̍h-ōe-jī: N̂g Siān-tek; March 15, 1919 – November 20, 2013) was a Taiwanese martial artist and former Army general.

== Early life ==
Huang Sian Teh was born on March 15, 1919, in Cai Village, Hui'an County, Fujian Province, China, soon after the fall of the last emperor of the Qing dynasty. This was during the Warlord Era, a dangerous and violent period in Chinese history with much lawlessness and civil war raging throughout the country. Due to the dangerous times, Huang's father sent him to study Northern & Southern Shaolin kung fu at the age of five. During his training Huang learned both northern and southern style martial arts as well as tai chi and qigong.

== Sino-Japanese War ==
In 1937, China was attacked. Huang, like many other young Chinese men, joined the army in order to defend the country from the invading Japanese. During this time, Huang's bravery and courage were recognized, and he was eventually promoted to general of the Chinese Nationalist Army under the Kuomintang. During World War II, Huang was in charge of the "Tiger Division", which fought in over 100 battles. After the war, when the country was weakened and in disarray, the communists eventually forced the Nationalists to withdraw to the island of Taiwan.

== Taiwan ==
Huang came to Taiwan with the Kuomintang in 1949 along with many other top Chinese Martial Arts masters including Chang Dongsheng. They both later went on to teach at Chinese Culture University in Taipei. After arriving in Taiwan, Huang became a police officer to help establish law and order on the dangerous and lawless Island. While working for the police department in Taiwan, Master Huang also served as a hand-to-hand combat teacher at the police academy. Many of the top masters that relocated to Taiwan taught their martial arts to either the military or the police. It was while serving at the Taiwan Police Academy that Huang met and befriended Fan Chi Sau (范之孝), the two would remain friends and leaders of the martial arts community in Taiwan for more than half a century. After retiring from the police service Huang began teaching Shaolin kung fu and later was appointed Chairman of the Taipei Chinese Kung Fu Association in 1967.

== Affiliations ==
Huang Sian Teh was not only a skilled martial artist but also the first Chinese Poet Laureate and a talented painter. Huang was involved in the leadership of the following organizations:

- World Chi Kung Society
- Chinese Martial Arts Association of R.O.C.
- Taipei Chinese Kung Fu Association
- Chinese Medicine Research Association
- Wu Yuen Group
- World Chinese Martial Arts Federation
- National Gymnastics Monthly Magazine
- World Kung Fu Championship

While over the age of ninety Huang remained healthy in both body and mind and was able to continue his responsibilities at the Taipei Martial Arts Association offices on Pa-Teh Road in Taipei. Huang had a sharp memory and could recount nearly a centuries worth of priceless knowledge regarding the history of Chinese martial arts dating back to the Qing dynasty. At the age of 86 Huang was one of the hosts of the first group of Shaolin Monks to visit the Island of Taiwan in 2005, and he continued to be active in the world martial arts community overseeing branches of the World Chinese Martial Arts Federation all over the world. He died in November 2013 at the age of 94.
