= Singapore Buddhist Lodge =

Lay Buddhist and charitable organization in Singapore

- 新加坡佛教居士林
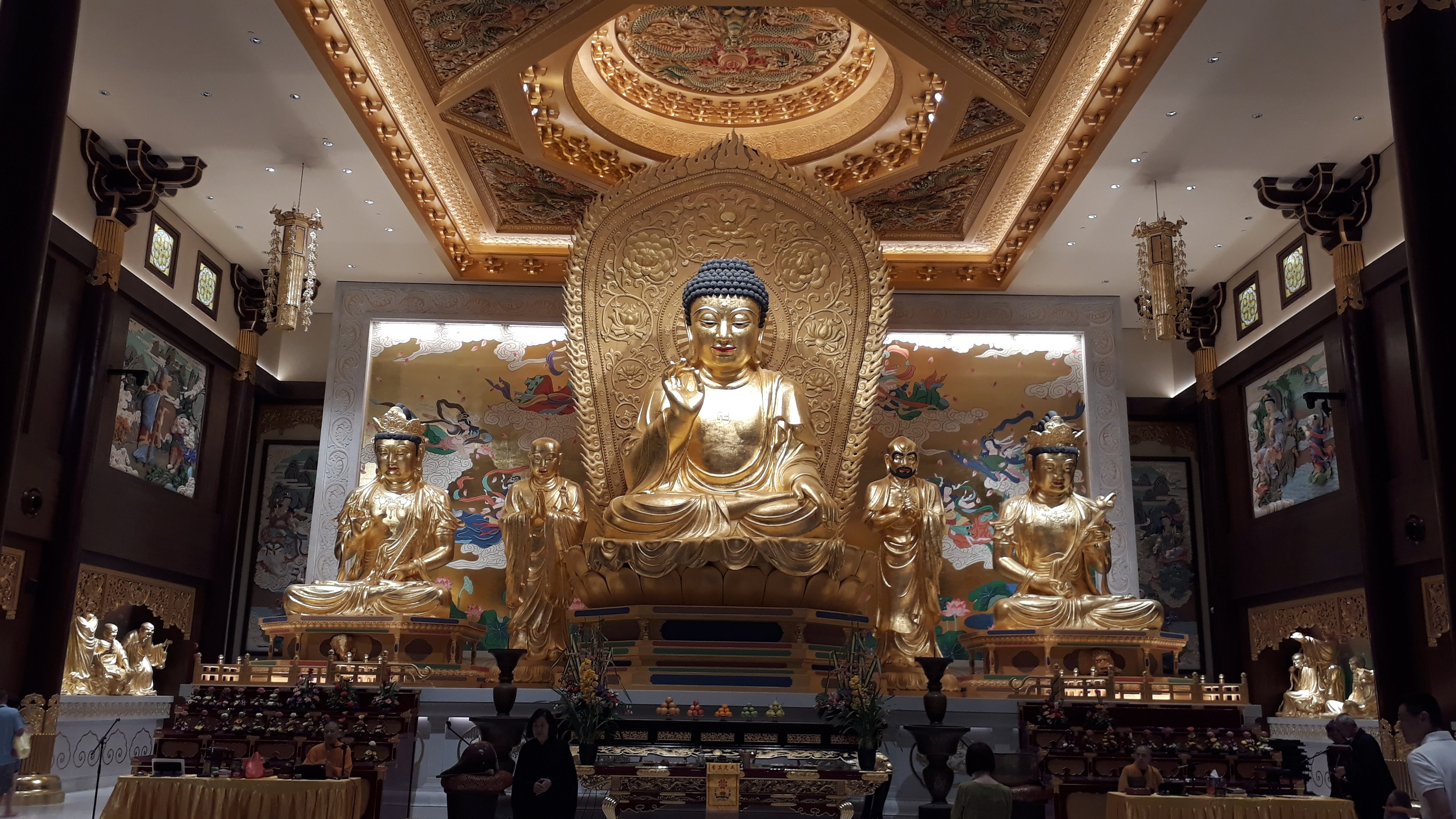
- Main Shrine Hall of Singapore Buddhist Lodge
- Founded: June 17, 1934; 91 years ago
- Location: 17-19 Kim Yam Rd, Singapore 239329
- Chief Executive: Tan Lee Huak (Acting)
- Website: https://www.sbl.org.sg/

The Singapore Buddhist Lodge (SBL; 新加坡佛教居士林) is a lay Buddhist and charitable organization in Singapore. Founded in 1934, it is one of the oldest charities in Singapore.

== History ==
On 16 July 1933, the SBL was founded by the Singapore Buddhist Sutra Circulation Center. The creation of lodge was funded by around 100 philanthropists, including Lee Choon Seng with a donation of around $1,000, to promote Buddhism and the distribution of Buddhist texts. It was officially established on 17 June 1934. The center was originally located at 26 Blair Road.

By 1946, membership of the center increased to 2,000. The center began renting premises at 17 Kim Yam Road to cope with the increase in membership. In 1950, the building was purchased by the center with a donation of $10,000 from Zhang Jiamei and Zhong Tianshui and money obtained in a fundraising drive.

In 2014, the lodge planned to add a new worship hall.

In 2015, the president of the lodge, Lee Bock Guan, died and Simon Kuah took over presidency. Since May 2016, members of the lodge questioned management practices and financial irregularities by the management. In September 2016, the Singapore Buddhist Lodge held a special general meeting to address multiple concerns raised by Lee Jingjing, daughter of former Lodge head Lee Bock Guan, regarding its operations. Lee accused the board of losing credibility, called for its replacement, and indicated plans to lodge a complaint with the authorities. Acting head Simon Kuah maintained that the board was legitimately formed and that disagreements should be resolved internally. Financial issues also sparked controversy, and no consensus was ultimately reached between the parties. In October, the Commissioner of Charities held a meeting with the board and senior managers. In late November, Kuah resigned all his posts with the lodge. Tan Lee Huak took over as acting president of the lodge. The lodge's chief executive, Neo Bee Noi, left in January 2017.

In 2020, during its 85th anniversary celebration, the new worship hall was opened and a new golden Buddha statue was consecrated. Total construction costs of the hall, statue and refurbishment works exceeded $63 million.

On September 14, 2024, then-President of Singapore Tharman Shanmugaratnam officiated the opening ceremony of the Buddhist Lodge’s "Heritage Gallery." The Lodge also commissioned bronze statues of Venerable Zhuan Dao and lay leader Lee Choon Seng.

=== Promotion of Buddhist Education ===
The lodge offers a weekly Dharma class for children aged 6 to 14, with enrolment growing from 25 students in its first intake to nearly 100 by 2024.

=== Charitable Work ===
In 1998, the lodge established the “SBL Vision Family Service Centre” to provide professional counselling and advisory services; in 1999, it launched a Traditional Chinese Medicine (TCM) clinic and a mobile medical service.

=== Poverty Alleviation Efforts in China ===
Since 2002, the Singapore Buddhist Lodge has, in accordance with the will of its first President, Lee Bock Guan, made long-term donations for poverty alleviation to Jinping County and Malipo County in Yunnan, China. These donations have been channeled through the Embassy of the People's Republic of China in Singapore to the Ministry of Foreign Affairs of China.

== Presidents ==
- Lee Bock Guan, 1993–2015
- Simon Kuah, 2015–2016
- Tan Lee Huak (acting), 2016–present

== See also ==
- Buddhism in Singapore
- List of Buddhist temples in Singapore
- List of voluntary welfare organisations in Singapore
- Zhuan Dao
- Religion in Singapore
