= Lin Junde =

Explosives engineer ( 1938 – 2012)

- 林俊德
- Born: March 13, 1938; Yongchun, Fujian, China
- Died: May 31, 2012 (aged 74); Tangdu Hospital, Xi'an, Shaanxi, China
- Resting place: Malan Nuclear Test Base
- Education: Zhejiang University
- Spouse: Huang Jianqin (m. 1967; died 2012)
- Scientific career
- Fields: Mechanics of explosion
- Workplaces: Xinjiang Malan Nuclear Test Base

Lin Junde (Chinese: 林俊德; pinyin: Lín Jùndé; Pe̍h-ōe-jī: Lîm Chùn-tek; 13 March 1938 – 31 May 2012) was a Chinese explosion mechanics scientist and researcher at Xinjiang Malan Nuclear Test Base. He had spent 52 years working in the Gobi Desert in northwest China, participating in the nuclear tests there.

He held the rank of major general (shao jiang) in the People's Liberation Army (PLA). He was a member of the Chinese Academy of Engineering.

== Biography ==
Lin was born in Jiefu Township of Yongchun County, Quanzhou, China on March 13, 1938. After graduating from Zhejiang University in 1960, he was assigned to study at PLA Military Institute of Engineering in Harbin, northeast China's Heilongjiang province. In May 1963 he was transferred to the PLA General Equipment Department, where he headed the development of pressure recorder for measuring nuclear explosion shock wave. From the explosion of China's first atomic bomb in 1964 to the last underground nuclear test in 1996, he participated in all 45 nuclear tests in China.

In 1993 he was promoted to the rank of major general (shao jiang).

In 2001 he was accepted as an academician of the Chinese Academy of Engineering.

On May 31, 2012, he died of cholangiocarcinoma at the Tangdu Hospital, Xi'an, Shaanxi. Before he died, he said: "I've only done one thing in my life, nuclear test. I'm very satisfied."

In February 2013, he was honored as one of the "Ten People Who Moved China".

== Personal life ==
In 1967 Lin married Huang Jianqin (Chinese: 黄建琴), who was his colleague at Xinjiang Malan Nuclear Test Base.

== Awards ==
- 1969 3rd Prize of National Science and Technology Progress Award
- 2013 Order of Heroic Exemplar for Distinguished Scientist (Devoted to the cause of National Defense Technology)
