= Ren Ci Hospital =

Hospital in Singapore

- Ren Chi Hospitals

Geography
- Location: Singapore
- Coordinates: 1.3260°N 103.8509°E

Organisation
- Type: Community hospital
- Religious affiliation: Buddhist

History
- Opened: 1994; 32 years ago

Links
- Website: www.renci.org.sg
- Lists: Hospitals in Singapore

Ren Ci Hospital (Chinese: 仁慈医院) is one of the first few charity healthcare institutions in Singapore to provide affordable healthcare and rehabilitative services in Singapore. Established in 1994, Ren Ci Hospital currently has three facilities Ren Ci Community Hospital, Ren Ci @ Ang Mo Kio and Ren Ci @ Bukit Batok St. 52. Besides government subvention, Ren Ci Hospital also relies heavily on public support and donation.

== History ==
On 30 August 1994, it was announced that Foo Hai Ch'an Monastery will take over the Chronic Sick Unit at Woodbridge Hospital in Hougang, Singapore. The unit was then renamed as Ren Ci Hospital.

Ren Ci Hospital was officially opened on 24 June 1995.

In 2003, Ren Ci Hospital gave up its new community hospital to Tan Tock Seng Hospital to help in the response to the 2002–2004 SARS outbreak in Singapore.

In 2007, the Ministry of Health (MOH) announced that the hospital and its chief executive officer (CEO) Shi Ming Yi are under investigation for 'possible irregularities in certain financial transactions'. An audit found that the charity had made interest-free loans amounting to a few million dollars to various companies since 1996. There were discrepancies between what the charity recorded it lent and what the companies involved recorded as having borrowed.

As the charity's Institute of Public Character (IPC) status was due to expire during the investigation, it was not renewed. On 14 July 2008, Ming Yi stepped down as its CEO. The hospital regained its IPC status on 5 August 2008. After the IPC status was restored, Wong Yue Sia was announced interim CEO with James Toi as deputy CEO. Toi is expected to take over as CEO when Wong stepped down.

In 2009, Ming Yi was convicted on four charges and was sentenced to 10 months in jail for misappropriating Ren Ci funds, making unauthorized loans and giving false information to the Commissioner for Charities. He filed an appeal against the sentence. The appeal was dismissed by Justice Tay Yong Kwang but Tay reduced the sentence from 10 months to 6 months based on Ming Yi's significant contributions to Ren Ci and society.

Loh Kum Mow, a Singapore millionaire who died in December 2016 at the age of 89, divided his fortune in four. After his death he bequeathed large sums of money to the National Kidney Foundation (NKF), Thye Hua Kwan Moral Charities, Ren Ci Hospital and Bo Tien Welfare Services Society. Ren Ci Hospital received close to S$840,000.

== Ren Ci Charity Show ==
In 2002, Ren Ci Hospital collaborated with SPH MediaWorks' Channel U to host a televised charity show, Ren Ci Charity Show, to be held at the National University of Singapore's University Cultural Centre on 12 January 2003. Initially planned for 5 January, it was postponed to avoid clashing with the Jade Solid Gold Best Ten Music Awards Presentation held in Hong Kong. The charity show featured MediaWorks artistes such as Adrian Pang and Darren Lim, who performed stunts, Singapore and Hong Kong stars such as A-do, Andy Lau, Dave Wang, Law Kar-ying, who sung on the show, and actress Nancy Sit with the main cast of Hongkong drama A Kindred Spirit performing a skit. As part of the show, Ren Ci Hospital's CEO, Ming Yi, abseiled down from a 45-storey building at Suntec City, leading to the highest increase in donations during the show.
