= DAAI Mandarin =

- 大愛與您分享
- Country of origin: Indonesia
- Original language: Mandarin

Production
- Running time: 24 minutes

Original release
- Network: DAAI TV
- Release: 3 August 2008 – present

DAAI Mandarin (大愛與您分享 --- Da Ai Yu Nin Fen Xiang) is a Mandarin-language television news program that has been aired on Da Ai TV Indonesia since 3 August 2008.

The program was created to offer news to Mandarin speaking Chinese people living in Indonesia. It is on the 59th UHF Channel. The program highlights various themes such as social-humanitarianism, health, education, and acculturation of Chinese-Indonesian cultures. The program also aims at expanding viewers’ knowledge and providing a Mandarin learning device, enabling viewers to learn Mandarin through its shows.

== Program schedule ==
- First run: Saturday at 18.00 WIB
- Re-run: Next Saturday at 12.30 WIB

== See also ==
- Tzu Chi
- Tzu Chi Malaysia
- Tzu Chi University
