= Hong Choon =

Singapore Buddhist monk

- 宏船法師

Personal life
- Born: 9 October 1907 Jinjiang County, Fujian Province, Qing Empire
- Died: 25 December 1990 (aged 83) Singapore
- Occupation: Abbot

Religious life
- Religion: Buddhism

Senior posting
- Based in: Kong Meng San Phor Kark See Monastery
- Predecessor: Venerable Zhuan Dao
- Successor: Venerable Yan Pei
- Students: Venerable Kwang Phing, Venerable Kwang Sheng, Venerable Kwang Chao

Hong Choon (Chinese: 宏船法師; 1907 – 25 December 1990) was the second president of the Singapore Buddhist Federation and the second abbot of Kong Meng San Phor Kark See Monastery.

== Early life ==
Hong Choon was born in 1907 in Jinjiang, Fujian province, China. In 1922, at the age of 13, he was ordained by Hui Quan at Cheng Tian Temple and was given his Dharma name, Hong Choon. During the Second Sino-Japanese war, Venerable Hong Choon fled southern China with his master, seeking refuge in Singapore.

Hong Choon also studied Feng Shui under Master Yen Ben in the 1950s.

== Career ==
Venerable Hong Choon became the abbot of Kong Meng San Phor Kark See Monastery in 1943, administering the temple and representing it at social and Buddhist functions for over four decades, propagating Buddhism in Singapore. During his leadership, the monastery transformed from two shrine halls into a monastic facility with a total area as large as ten football fields, the largest venue of Buddhist practice in Singapore. He also initiated the monthly Great Compassion Prayer and propagated the Dharma during his charge.

Hong Choon was the President of Singapore Buddhist Federation, and also nominated as the honorary president of several Buddhist temples in Singapore, and in the Southeast Asia region. The Thai King, Bhumibol Adulyadej conferred him the title of Highest Monk, Phra Ajancin Bodhi Sangvara Sinhanakorn Kanachan in 1987.

Ven Hong Choon was also honored as one of the prominent Feng Shui masters of his time.

== Singapore-China Relations ==
Towards his later years, Venerable Hong Choon made eight visits to China between 1982 and 1990. During these pilgrimages, which included visiting sacred Buddhist sites and officiating religious ceremonies, he met Chinese and Buddhist leaders to help restore the monasteries associated with his master Venerable Hui Quan.

== Death ==
Hong Choon died on 25 December 1990, after which a relic stupa and a memorial hall was built at the Phor Kark See Monastery conmemorating him.

== See also ==
- Venerable Zhuan Dao
- Lee Choon Seng
- Buddhism in Singapore
- List of Buddhist temples in Singapore
