= Cai Liusheng =

Chinese physical chemist

- 蔡镏生
- Born: 16 August 1902; Quanzhou, Fujian, Qing China
- Died: 24 October 1983 (aged 81); Changchun, Jilin, China
- Education: Yenching University; University of Chicago
- Scientific career
- Fields: Physical chemistry
- Workplaces: Jilin University

Chinese name
- Simplified Chinese: 蔡镏生
- Traditional Chinese: 蔡鎦生
Transcriptions
Standard Mandarin
- Hanyu Pinyin: Cài Liúshēng
- Wade–Giles: Liu-Sheng T'sai
Southern Min
- Hokkien POJ: Chhòa Liû-seng

Cai Liusheng (Chinese: 蔡鎦生; Pe̍h-ōe-jī: Chhòa Liû-seng; 18 September 1902 – 24 October 1983) was a Chinese physical chemist and an academician of the Chinese Academy of Sciences. He was one of the founders of catalytic kinetics in China. He was a delegate to the 3rd and 5th National People's Congress.

== Early life ==
Cai was born into a peasant family in Quanzhou, Fujian, on 18 September 1902. He studied at Peiyuan High School (培元中学), and became fascinated by chemistry in childhood. In 1924, he graduated from Yenching University, where he majored in the Chemistry.

He arrived in the United States in 1929 to begin his education at the University of Chicago. He returned to China after his graduation and worked at his alma mater. In the spring of 1948, he was invited to the University of Washington as a visiting scholar. In 1949, he gave up the opportunity to be employed as a professor at the Graduate School of St. Louis Medical University and returned to China to become director of the Department of Chemistry at Yanjing University.

In 1952, in response to the call of the Communist government, he went to Northeast Renmin University (later restructured as Jilin University), where he cooperated with Tang Aoqing, Guan Shizhi and Tao Weisun to establish the Department of Chemistry. He joined the Communist Party on 4 May 1982.

On 24 October 1983, he died of illness in Changchun, Jilin, aged 81.

== Recognition ==
- 1957 Member of the Chinese Academy of Sciences (CAS)
