= Shi Ming Yi =

Singaporean Buddhist monk

Ming Yi
- Title: Venerable Shi Ming Yi

Religious life
- Religion: Buddhism
- School: Mahayana

Venerable Shi Ming Yi (Chinese: 释明义; birth name Goh Kah Heng; born 1962) is a Singaporean Buddhist monk, and the abbot of Foo Hai Ch'an Monastery.

== Education ==
Shi Ming Yi received his Masters in Healthcare Management from the University of Wales.

It was reported that the venerable claimed to hold a PhD in Philosophy that was awarded by "Mannin University" in Ireland, a university whose existence could not be verified. Ming Yi's spokesman commented that the research degree was undertaken through distance learning and that the monk never visited the university.

== Life ==
In September 1994, Foo Hai Ch'an Monastery, under the leadership of Ming Yi, established the 175-bed Ren Ci Hospital and Medicare Centre for chronically ill patients among the poor and needy.

In 1996, the Singapore government awarded the Public Service Medal to Ming Yi in recognition of his contributions to Singapore.

Ming Yi took over the abbotship of the Kun Chung Temple in Hong Kong, the Kwan Inn Temple in Petaling Jaya, Malaysia, and the vice-chairmanship of the affiliated Heung Hoi Ching Kok Lin Association.

In November 2007, Ren Ci Hospital and Ming Yi were investigated for irregularities in Ren Ci Hospital's financial transactions. After a five-month probe, Ming Yi was arrested.

On 14 July 2008, Ming Yi stepped down from all his positions regarding charities. His trial commenced on the next day. On 7 October 2009, Ming Yi was convicted of four charges of conspiracy, misuse of funds and forgery. and was sentenced to 10 months in jail. He appealed against the sentence but the appeal was dismissed by Justice Tay Yong Kwang. Tay reduced the sentence from 10 months to 6 months based on Ming Yi's significant contributions to Ren Ci and society; Ming Yi began his jail sentence immediately.

On 26 August 2010, Ming Yi was released from prison after serving four months; he was given one-third remission on his jail term for good behaviour but put on the home detention scheme in which he was electronically tagged and only allowed to leave the house at fixed times. He completed his sentence on 27 September. For the six remaining charges, he was given a discharge amounting to an acquittal for them.

The Public Service Medal awarded in 1996 was then removed by the President of Singapore, S R Nathan, subsequent to Shi Ming Yi's conviction and imprisonment for conspiracy, misuse of funds and forgery with effect from 23 May 2011.

After Ming Yi was released from prison, he resumed his abbotship at Foo Hai Ch'an Monastery, and instituted a system of checks evaluating requests for financial assistance. He was however no longer the temple's charity trustee and president. On 27 April 2015, Ming Yi donated his left kidney to an unnamed young woman at a Singaporean hospital and was discharged three days later.

== Ren Ci Hospital financial irregularities ==
In November 2007, Ren Ci Hospital was investigated by the Commissioner of Charities. Ming Yi was alleged to have made interest-free loans in violation of Ren Ci's own guidelines on Financial Management and Controls and Disclosure and Transparency, and had also served as both Board chairman and CEO of the hospital which was an infringement of existing guidelines since it creates a potential conflict of interest and a lack of check and balances.

In the course of the investigations by the auditing firm Ernst & Young, a few financial transactions could not be satisfactorily explained. The Ministry of Health referred the case to the Commercial Affairs Department in February 2008 and the final outcome of the investigation was completed in March 2008.

Ming Yi was arrested after a five-month probe. On 14 July 2008, he stepped down from all his positions regarding charities. The arrest came five months after he went on long leave when the police were asked to probe the charity's finances. His trial commenced on 15 July 2008. The Ministry of Health found 'possible irregularities' in Ren Ci's records after an audit.

At the heart of the issue were questionable loans made by the hospital, amounting to several million dollars. Some of these loans were allegedly given to companies with links to the venerable. There were also loans given to a helper with the charity as well as investments made over the years in his name. Assets that were questioned also included a multi-million dollar condominium in Singapore, properties in Australia and Seattle, a luxury BMW car, a racehorse named Venezuela, and diving holidays.

On 7 October 2009, Ming Yi was found guilty of misappropriating Ren Ci's funds by approving the loan, falsifying accounts and giving false information to the Commissioner of Charities (COC). He was sentenced to 10 months in jail and appealed the case. On 27 May 2010 Justice Tay Yong Kwang dismissed the appeal but reduced the sentence from 10 months to 6 months based on Ming Yi's significant contributions to Ren Ci and society; Ming Yi began his jail sentence immediately.

On 26 August 2010, Ming Yi was released from prison after serving four months; he was given one-third remission on his jail term for good behaviour but put on the home detention scheme in which he was electronically tagged and only allowed to leave the house at fixed times. He completed his sentence on 27 September 2010. For the six remaining charges, he was given a discharge amounting to an acquittal for them.
