= Zhuan Dao =

- Title: Venerable Sik Zhuan Dao

Religious life
- Religion: Buddhism

Senior posting
- Based in: Kong Meng San Phor Kark See Monastery
- Successor: Venerable Hong Choon

Venerable Zhuan Dao (Chinese: 转道; 1871–1943) was the founder of the Kong Meng San Phor Kark See Monastery in Singapore.

== Biography ==
Venerable Zhuan Dao was born in 1872 and was ordained as a monk at nineteen years old. In 1906, he assisted Venerable Hsu Yun to deliver the royal Tripitaka Volume to a monastery in Yunnan. Poo Thor Jee (普陀寺) was founded in 1911 by Venerable Zhuan Dao at Narcis Street in Tanjong Pagar, which was eventually rebuilt at Yan Kit Road in 1968. Venerable Zhuan Dao was well known within the Chinese community in Singapore for his medical knowledge and often provide free medical services to masses, particularly in curing children's illness. He founded the Phor Kark See Temple in 1920. The temple was built in 1921 on a plot of land donated by Chinese businessman, Tay Woo Seng, and subsequently became known as the Kong Meng San Phor Kark See Monastery, after the location "Bright Hill" that it was built on. In 1926, Venerable Zhuan Dao collaborated with several lay Buddhist leaders and invited several well-known Buddhist monks (like Venerable Tai Xu etc.) to visit Singapore for the propagation of Buddhist Teaching, this eventually led to the establishment of Chinese Buddhist Association (中华佛教会), Singapore Buddhist Sutra Distribution Centre (新加坡佛经流通处) and Singapore Buddhist Lodge (新加坡佛教居士林).

Zhuan Dao died in 1943 at Putuo Monastery at the age of 72 and Kong Meng San Phor Kark See Monastery was succeeded by Venerable Hong Choon.

== See also ==
- Venerable Hong Choon
- Buddhism in Singapore
- List of Buddhist temples
