= Buddhism in Singapore =

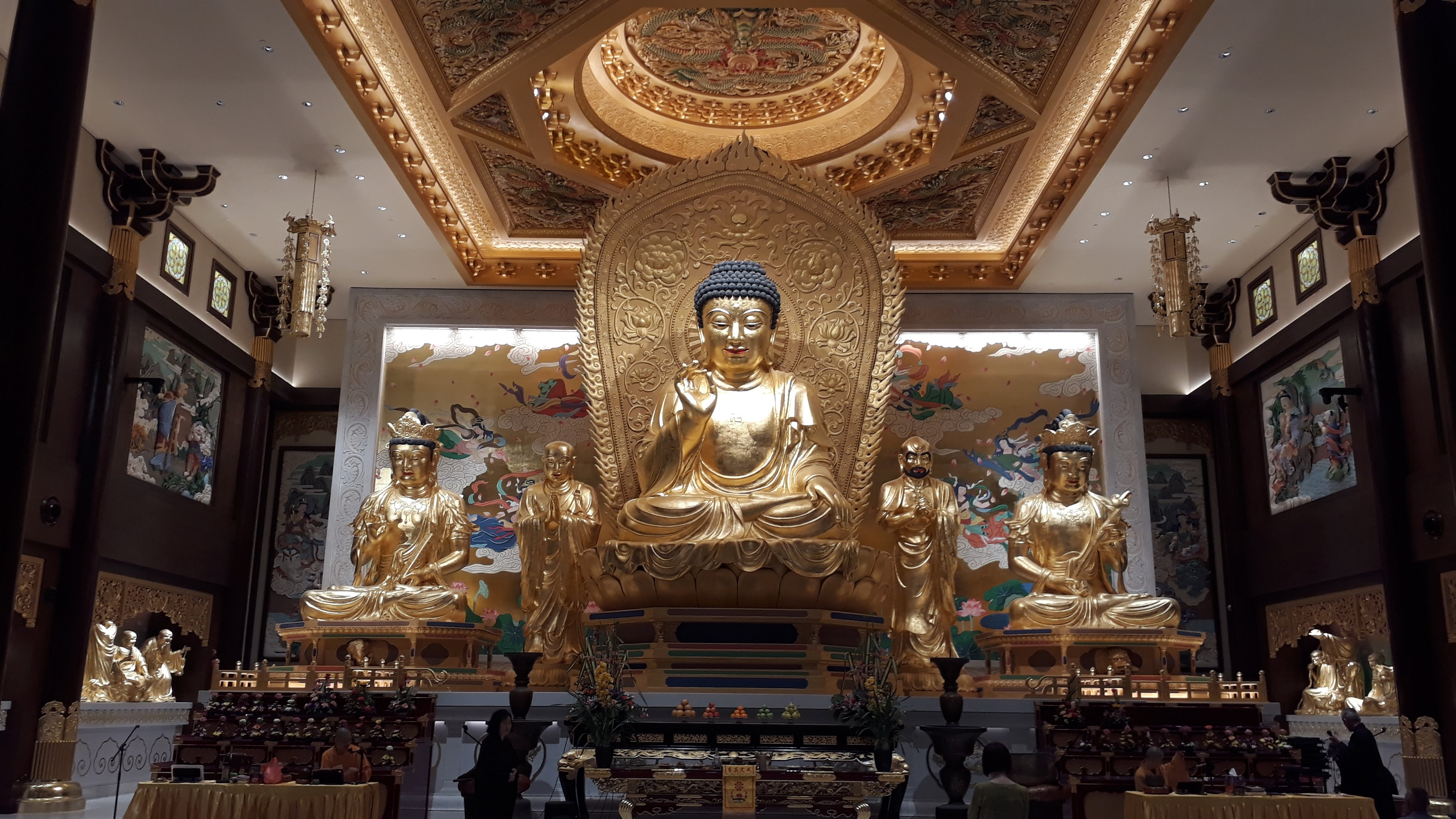
- Main Shrine Hall of the Singapore Buddhist Lodge at River Valley

Total population
- 1,074,159; 31.1% of the resident (Note: In Singapore, the term "resident" refers to both citizens and permanent residents (PRs).) population

Religions
- Chinese Buddhism (predominantly)

Buddhism is the largest religion in Singapore, practiced by approximately 31.1% of the population as of 2020. As per the census, out of 3,459,093 Singaporeans polled, 1,074,159 of them identified themselves as Buddhists.

There are a variety of Buddhist organizations in Singapore, with the more predominant authorities being established ones such as the Singapore Buddhist Federation (SBF).

== History ==
Buddhism was introduced in Singapore primarily by migrants from around the world over the past centuries. The first recorded histories of the Indian religion in Singapore can be observed in early monasteries and temples such as Thian Hock Keng and Jin Long Si Temple that were built by settlers that came from various parts of Asia.

Given the historic status of Singapore as a British trade port and colonial state, as well as a brief period of Japanese colonial rule during World War II, over the centuries a variety of Buddhist lineages from across the globe has appeared gradually on the island. They include Japanese and Western interpretations of the tripitaka, although a substantial local presence have their origins dating back into historic South East and East Asian kingdoms.

== Modern day ==
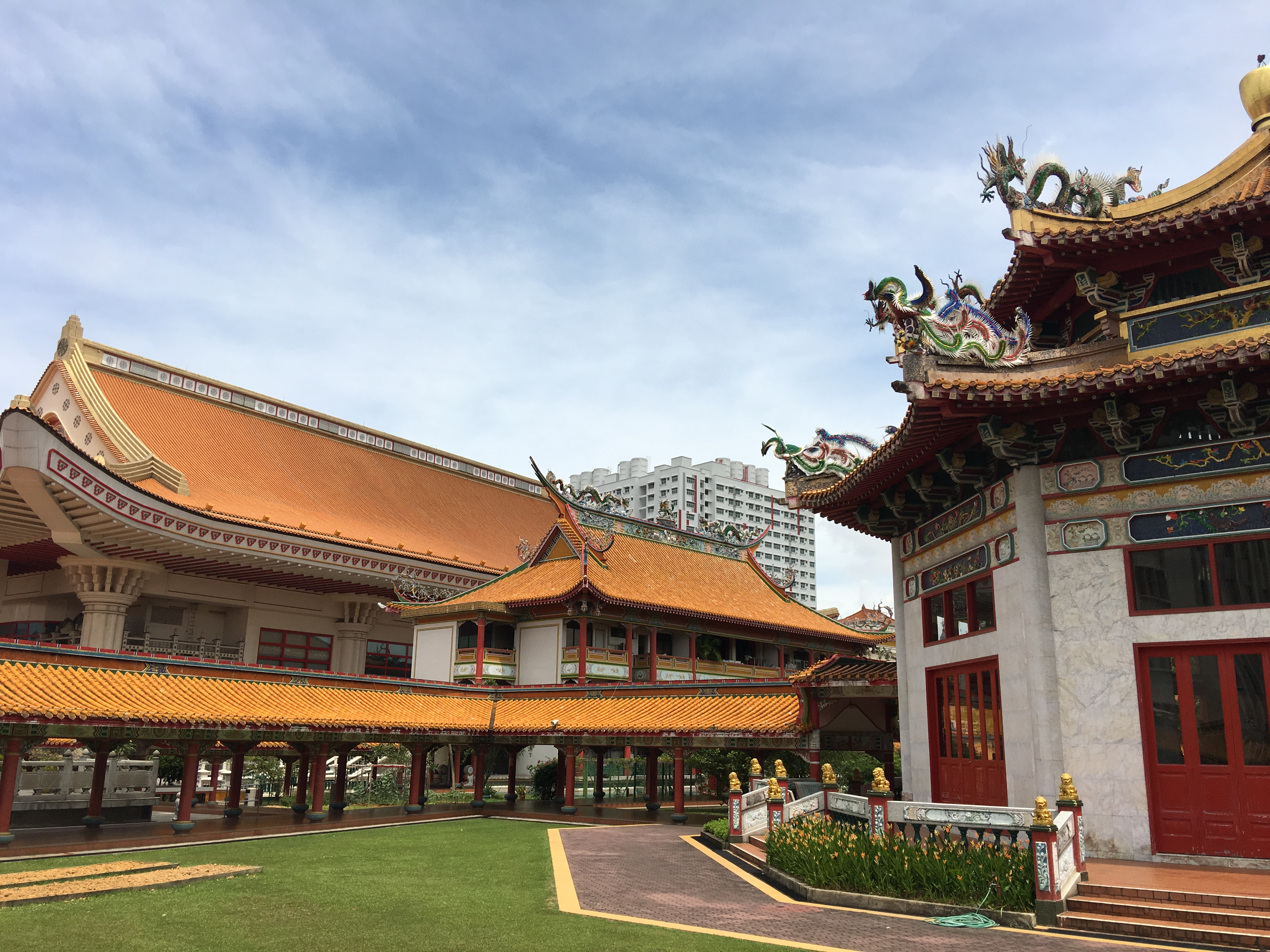
The Kong Meng San Phor Kark See Monastery at Bishan

=== Traditions and branches ===
Buddhists generally classify themselves as either Theravāda, Mahāyāna or Vajrayana practitioners. As the Singaporean Buddhist population predominantly comprises Chinese people, they adhere to Chinese Buddhism (a Chinese form of Mahayana Buddhism), including such branches as Chan Buddhism and Pure Land Buddhism. In recent years, some modernist transnational Mahayana Buddhist organizations have reached Singapore, like the Chinese-origin Buddha's Light International Association (BLIA), Dharma Drum Mountain (DDM) and Tzu Chi Singapore, as well as the Japanese-origin Nichiren Buddhist organizations Nichiren Shōshū Buddhist Association and Soka Gakkai International.

As a result of the activities of Tibetan missionaries, there are adherents of the Gelug, Kagyu and Nyingma schools of the Vajrayana among Singaporeans.

There are also Buddhists in Singapore that come from other ethnic groups such as the Thai, Sinhalese and Burmese, and practised the Theravādin Buddhist tradition with their own temples in Singapore like Wat Ananda, Sri Lankaramaya Buddhist Temple and Burmese Buddhist Temple.

=== Institutions ===
The Singapore Buddhist Federation (SBF, Xinjiapo fojiao zonghui 新加坡佛教總會), a national umbrella institution to represent the Buddhist community, was established in 1949.

The first existing Sunday Dhamma School was organised by late Mahaweera Maha Nayaka Thero in 1940, the syllabus was set according to the standard of Young Men's Buddhist Association (YMBA) of Colombo in Sri Lanka. In 1982, a 3-storey annex was built in Mangala Vihara to cater for the rapidly expanding Sunday Dhamma School. The Buddhist and Pali College of Singapore was set up in 1993 at Mangala Vihara, it is to cater for the religious and educational needs of Singaporeans who seek to widen and deepen their understanding and knowledge of Buddhism. Kong Meng San Phor Kark See Monastery has also established another institution known as The Buddhist College of Singapore in 2006.

=== Youth groups ===
Buddhism in Singapore has been experiencing a revival after the implementation of Religious Knowledge as compulsory programme in all secondary schools from 1984 to 1989. There are youth groups set up in various Buddhist Temples and Centres like Wat Ananda Youth, Young Buddhist Chapter (YBC), Mangala Vihara Youth Circle, Singapore Buddhist Mission Youth and Buddhist Fellowship Youth etc. Buddhist societies are established in various tertiary institutions like NUS Buddhist Society (NUSBS), NTU Buddhist Society (NTUBS), SMU Dhamma Circle (SMUDC), SIM Buddhist Bhavana (SIMBB), Ngee Ann Polytechnic Buddhist Society (NPBS) and Singapore Polytechnic Buddhist Society (SPBS). There are also many foreign students in tertiary institutions joining and involving in these Buddhist societies.

=== Buddhist events ===
In the early eighties, Sri Lankan Buddhist monk and scholar Ven K. Sri Dhammananda and several other Buddhist monastic members were frequently invited to Singapore to conduct English public talks and forums. There were also some famous Chinese Mahayana monks from Taiwan that are invited to conduct Mandarin or Hokkien public talks at the same period too. Singapore Buddhist Youth Mission once organised a large Mandarin public talk in 1999 by Ven Hui Lui from Taiwan at Singapore Indoor Stadium.

Since Ajahn Brahm was invited to be the Spiritual Patron of the Buddhist Fellowship in Singapore, he has frequently conduct English public talks in various locations of Singapore like Chui Huay Lim Club, Singapore Conference Hall and Ren Ci Hospital auditorium. In recent years, several monks from Thai Forest Tradition have been invited to conduct public talks in Singapore; Ajahn Jayasaro was invited to conduct a teaching tour in Singapore in 2017 and Ajahn Sumedho was invited to conduct a public talk at the auditorium of Kong Meng San Phor Kark See Monastery in 2019.

Since 2009, Buddhist film festivals were also organised in Singapore.

== Inter-faith ==
Singapore is a society of diverse religious traditions. The Buddhist community in Singapore has contributed much to the Singapore society. One example is the Buddhist Free Clinic. The Buddhist Free Clinic has multiple outlets across Singapore, providing free healthcare services to the public, regardless of the patients' ethnicity or beliefs. This demonstrates how Buddhism is part of the religious fabric in Singapore and how multiple faiths in Singapore get along with one another.

== Controversies ==
Venerable Ming Yi of Foo Hai Ch'an Monastery as of 2015 was imprisoned in a high-profile corruption scandal a few years ago. Ming Yi had been sentenced to 10 months in jail in November 2009 after being convicted on four charges of fraud, falsifying documents, misappropriating funds and giving false information to the Commissioner of Charities in 2008. Resulting from criminal charges and investigation, the Commissioner of Charities then suspended him from decision-making positions in Foo Hai Ch'an Monastery; Foo Hai Ch'an Buddhist Cultural and Welfare Association; Singapore Buddhist Free Clinic; the Singapore Regional Centre of the World Fellowship of Buddhists; and the Katho Temple.

Venerable Guo Jun, former abbot of the Mahabodhi Monastery in Bukit Timah, has drawn criticism for owning a property in Sydney worth more than A$500,000 (S$514,000) and for not wearing his monk's robe on at least one occasion in public and staying in Marina Bay Sands (MBS) integrated resort. Guo Jun also faced a lawsuit from a trustee Lee Boon Teow of the monastery, who has filed a Corrupt Practices Investigation Bureau (CPIB) report against him.

== See also ==
- Zhuan Dao
- Hong Choon
- Kong Meng San Phor Kark See Monastery
- List of Buddhist temples in Singapore
- Singapore Buddhist Lodge
- Buddhist Research Society
- Siong Lim Temple
