= Architecture of Singapore =

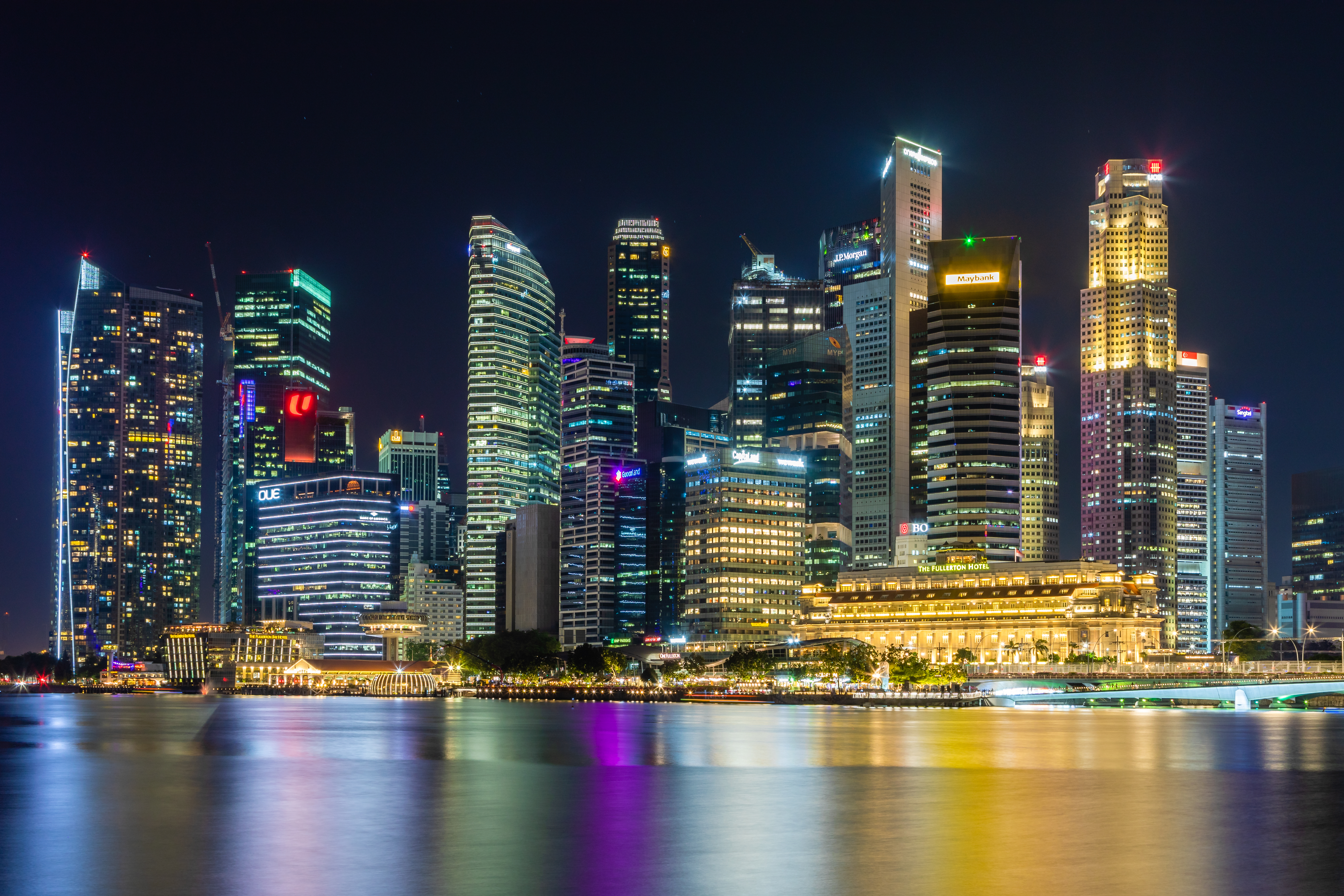
Skyline of the Downtown Core

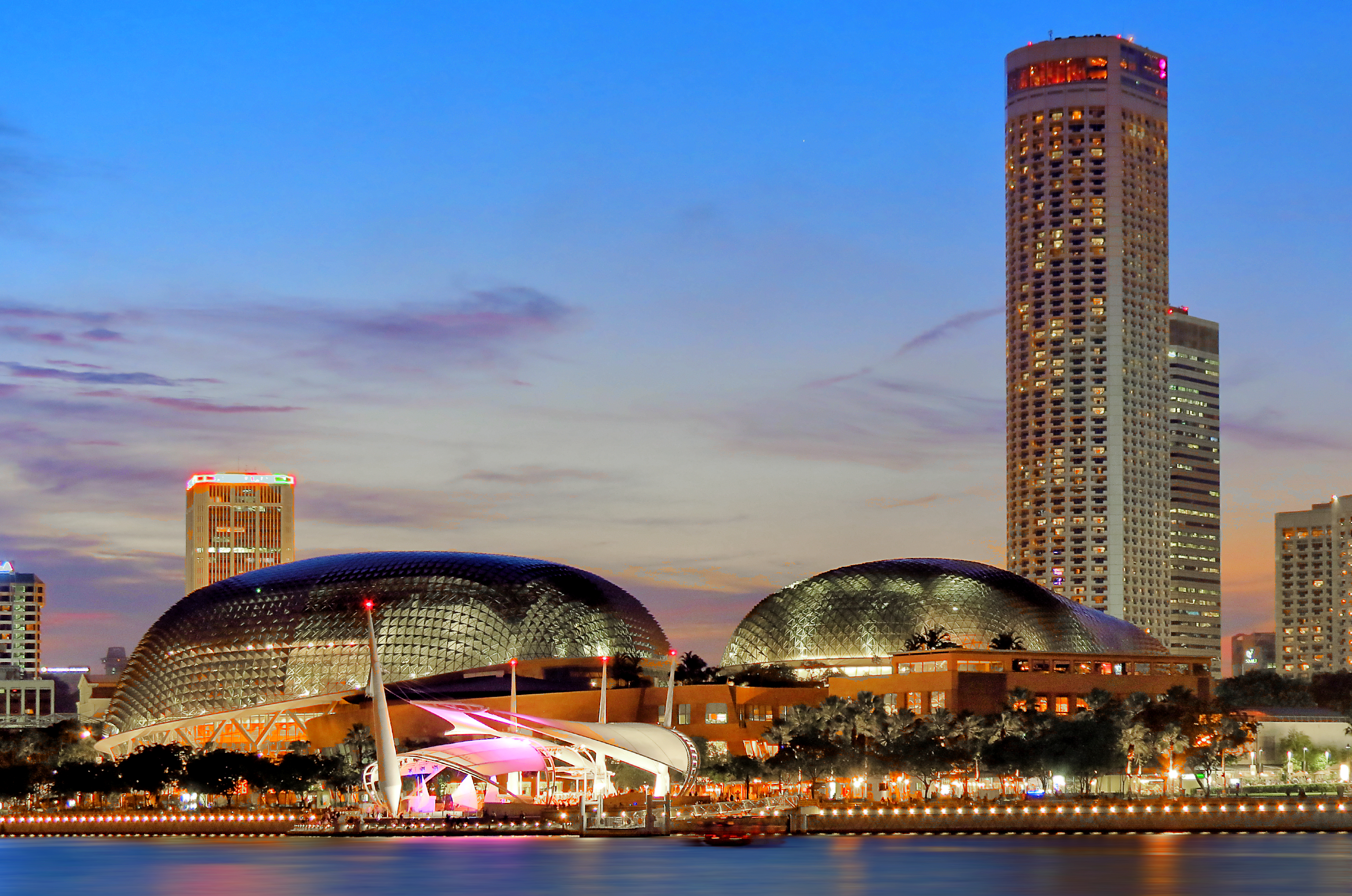
The Esplanade during the blue hour

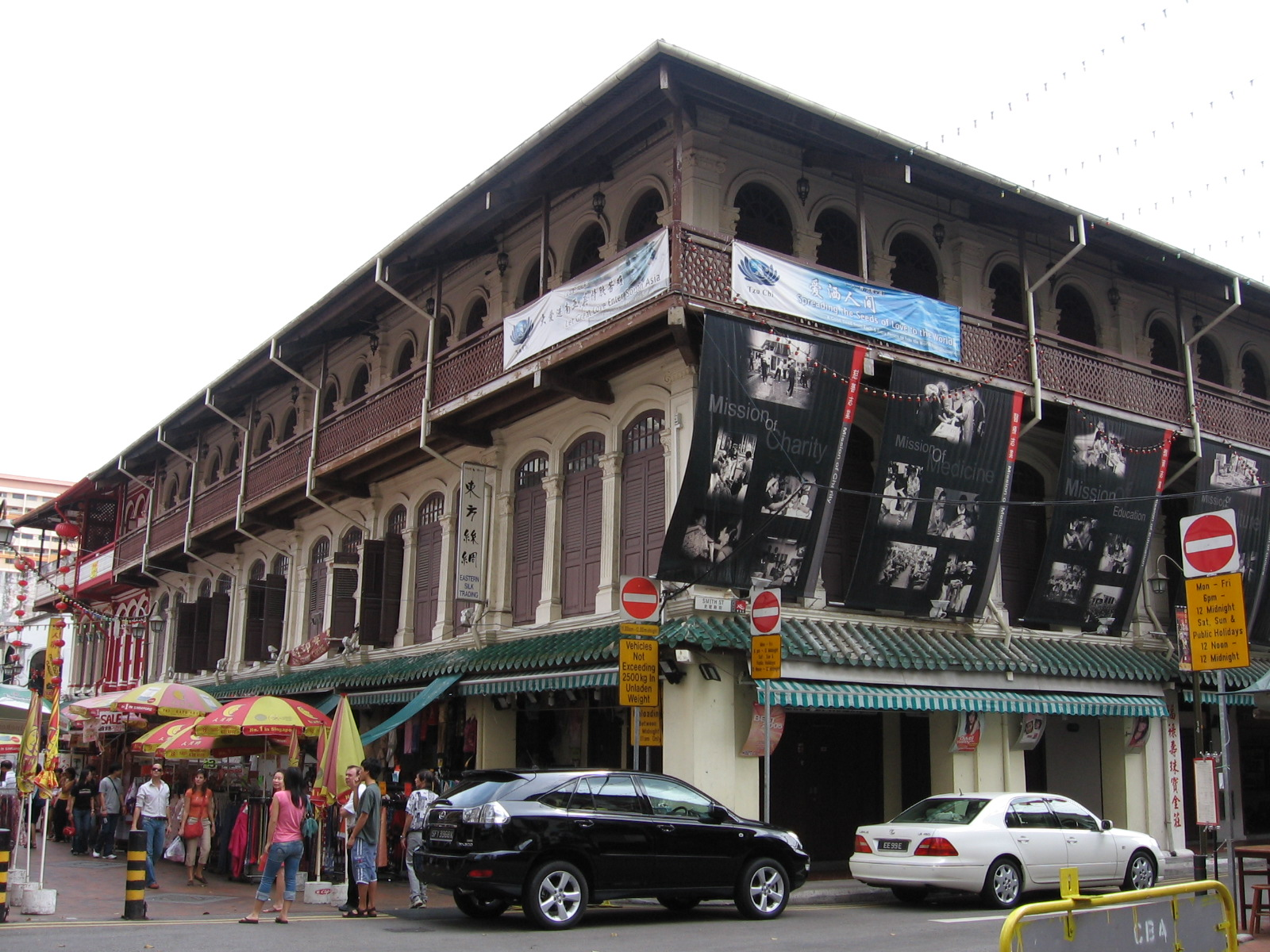
Lai Chun Yuan opera house in Chinatown.

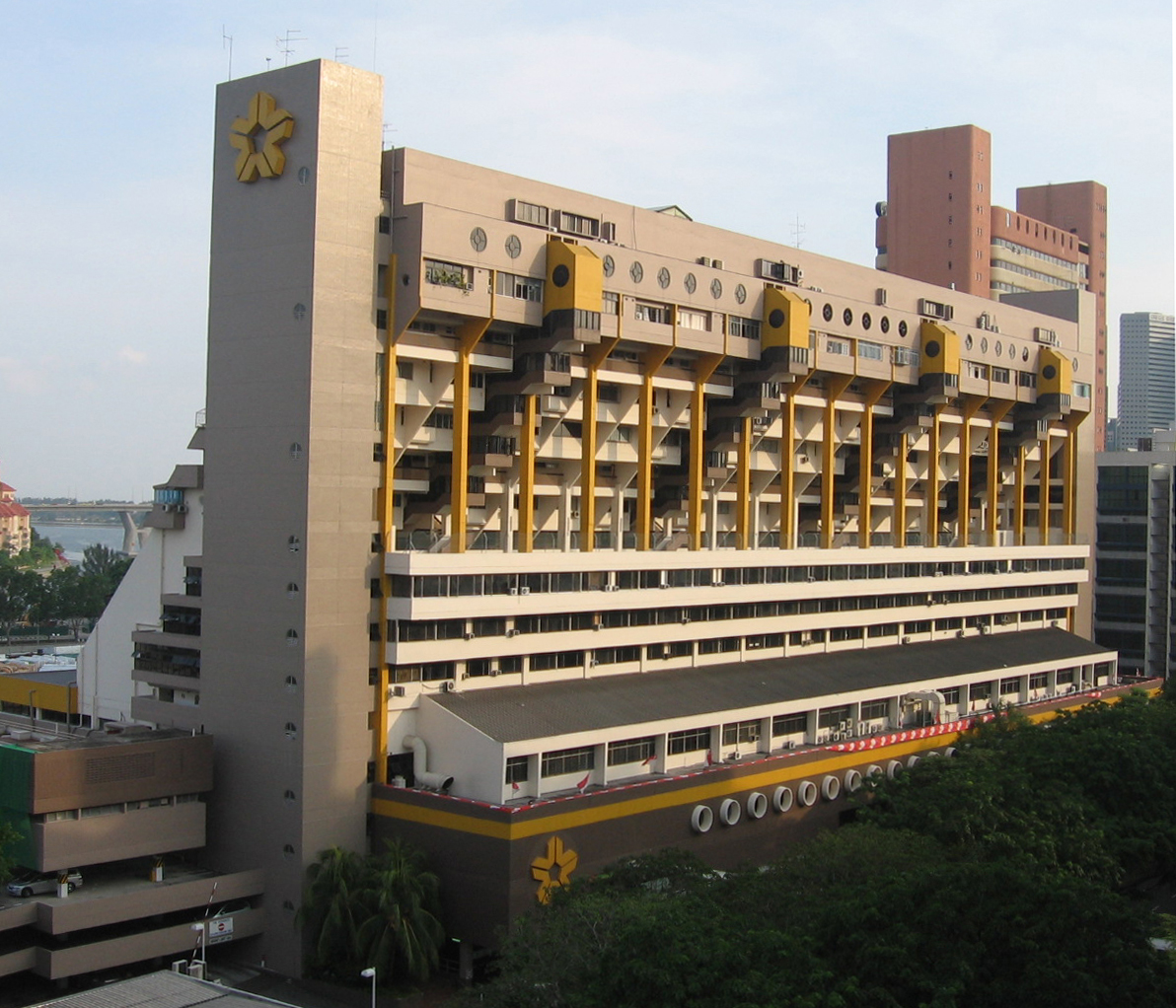
Golden Mile Complex

The architecture of Singapore displays a range of influences and styles from different places and periods. These range from the eclectic styles and hybrid forms of the colonial period to the tendency of more contemporary architecture to incorporate trends from around the world. In both aesthetic and technological terms, Singapore architecture may be divided into the more traditional pre-World War II colonial period, and the largely modern post-war and post-colonial period.

Traditional architecture in Singapore includes vernacular Malay houses, local hybrid shophouses and black and white bungalows, a range of places of worship reflecting the ethnic and religious diversity of the city-state as well as colonial civic and commercial architecture in European Neoclassical, gothic, palladian and renaissance styles.

Modern architecture in Singapore began with the transitional Art Deco style and the arrival of reinforced concrete as a popular building material. International Style modern architecture was popular from the 1950s to the 1970s, especially in the public housing apartment blocks. The Brutalist style of architecture was also popular in the 1970s. These styles coincided with the great urban renewal and building boom periods in Singapore history, and consequently these are the most common architectural styles seen on the island. Some of the more architecturally significant works of this period include Pearl Bank Apartments by Tan Cheng Siong, and the People's Park Complex and Golden Mile Complex by Design Partnership.

Post-modern architecture experiments, in both the 'historicist' and deconstructivist modes made an appearance in the 1980s, though the style was relatively muted in its expression. Another architectural trend has been the rediscovery of Singapore's architectural heritage, leading to an active conservation programme as well as a booming industry in the restoration of historic buildings, often adapting them to new uses. A recent example is the National Museum of Singapore.

An important area of local innovation has involved seeking to develop a form of modern architecture appropriate to Singapore's tropical climate. This climatically sensitive approach to architecture traces its roots back to the vernacular Malay houses and through to experiments by British colonial architects and early local nationalist architects to devise an authentically local architecture using modern construction methods. In the 1980s and especially from the late 1990s, this has led to a proliferation of what might be called 'modern tropical' architecture, or neo-tropical architecture. It involves a return to clean and simple rectilinear modernist forms, coupled with an emphasis of lush landscaping and sleek sun-shading in the form of metal or wood louvres, instead of the modernist glass curtain wall, which admits and traps solar heat. These architectural efforts have taken on a new relevance and urgency due to concerns about global warming, climate change and environmental sustainability, especially given that air conditioning in buildings is one of the largest consumers of electricity in Singapore, which is mostly generated by fossil fuels.

From the late 1990s, like many other global cities and aspiring global cities, the Singapore government consciously launched a drive to develop 'iconic' landmarks in the city to strengthen the Singapore brand identity as well as to attract foreign tourists, skilled immigrants, investments and buzz. Several such landmark projects have since been developed, sometimes through open or closed architectural design competitions. These include the Esplanade - Theatres on the Bay arts centre, the Supreme Court of Singapore, the new National Library, Singapore, the Marina Bay Sands Integrated Resort and the Singapore Flyer.

== Pre-colonial architecture ==
Malay houses on stilts, Kampong Bahru in Singapore, c. 1888.

Prior to the British establishment of a settlement in 1819, architecture followed the pattern of the surrounding region. Vernacular architecture was primarily village (or 'kampong') houses built in the Malay tradition. Malay kampong houses were built on stilts and raised above the ground (or water, depending on their location). The house was erected around a skeletal structure of tropical hardwood posts and beams, usually chengal. Medium hardwoods, like meranti, were used as floor boards, roof rafters and door and window frames. The roof itself was made of layers of palm frond thatch, while the walls were either made of woven bamboo strips or meranti planks. The basic form of the house was simple, but additional rooms could be added according to the requirements and wealth of the family. Likewise, the architectural ornament, in the form of carved wood fascia boards, screens and panels, could be quite elaborate.

Apart from this domestic rural architecture, there is evidence that more substantial buildings may have been built on the island. A nearby example of similar classical Hindu-Buddhist Malay architecture is Candi Muara Takus in the Riau province of Sumatra. Like the Singapore example, it also featured the use of sandstone as well as terraces. Stone foundations on Fort Canning Hill were discovered by the British soon after they arrived. Although they have since been destroyed and removed, the officials who discovered them speculated they were part of Hindu or Buddhist temples and/or a royal palace. The superstructure of these buildings would have been timber (as suggested by holes found in the foundations). However, these had long since disappeared by the time the foundations were discovered in 1819. Apart from some archaeological fragments, like jewellery, porcelain, coins and an inscribed stone, there few material artefacts from the pre-colonial period, and no buildings or even ruins remaining today.

== Colonial period ==
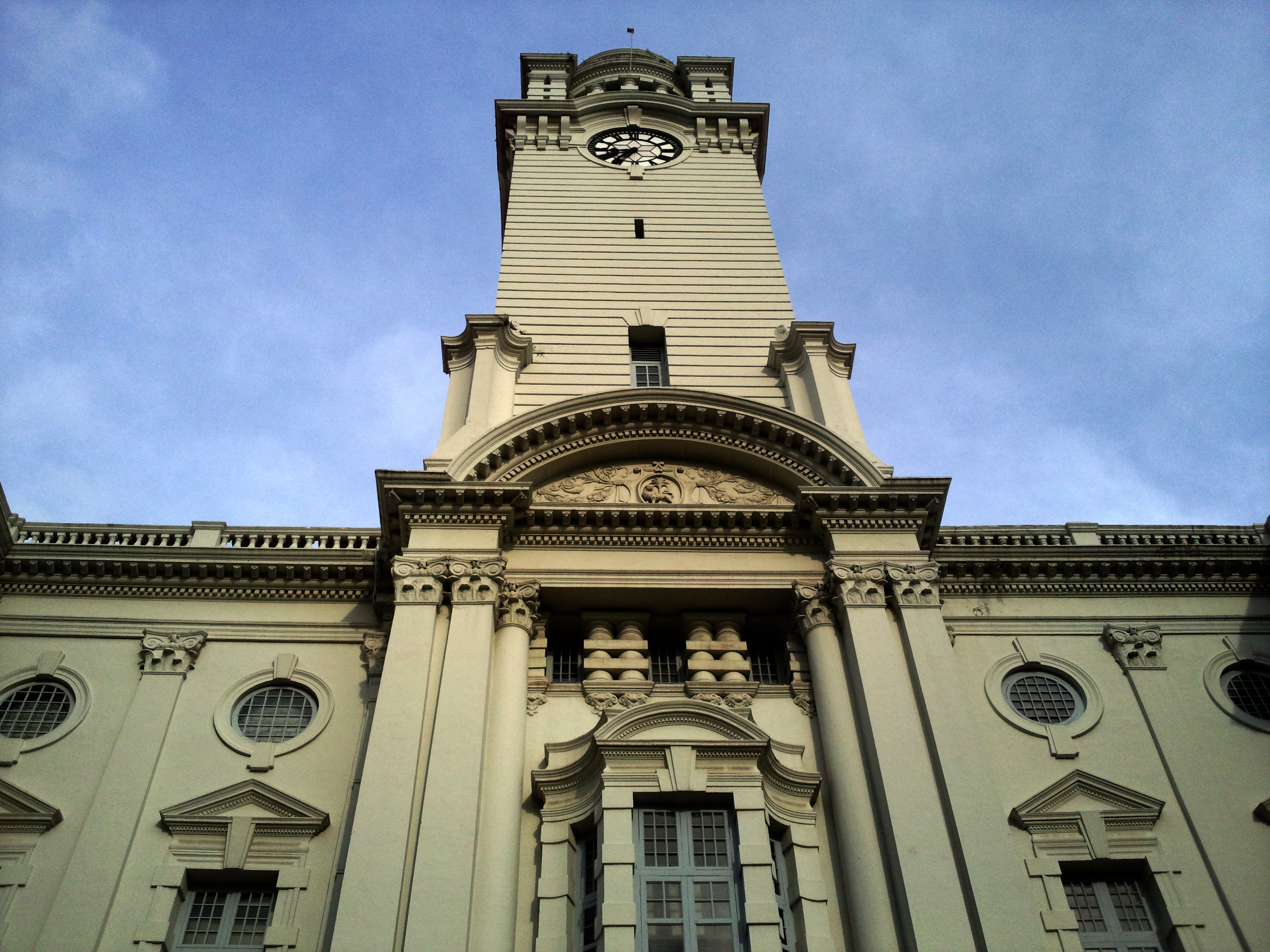
Victoria Theatre and Concert Hall

The city of Singapore was planned by Sir Stamford Raffles in 1822, and his layout for the city, the Raffles Plan of Singapore, largely survives to this day, even if the city has expanded greatly through the years. Raffles specified the area for government offices, various ethnic communities, religious buildings, commerce and education, as well as a Botanic Garden. Raffles planned the city down to the size of the house, the widths of the streets, and the material to be used. Raffles' regulations for the city also has some influence over the architecture, and some of their effects may still be seen in the shop houses; for example it is stipulated that they should not be over 3 stories high, and needed to have an obligatory five foot way. Raffles himself opted for a Malay style house made of wood and atap (Raffles House on Bukit Larangan or Fort Canning Hill, once called Government Hill), other Europeans of the period however preferred European style buildings of brick and stucco.

Singapore's most prominent architect in the early colonial era was George Drumgoole Coleman, who was responsible for many of these early European style buildings, few of which survived. Those that did include the old Parliament house and Caldwell House at CHIJMES.

In the 19th century, two hybrid building typologies evolved in Singapore. While their origins can be traced elsewhere, these building types underwent significant local adaptation and modification before spreading regionally. As a result, they are Singapore's earliest known architectural innovations and exports. These hybrid building typologies were the shophouse and the black and white bungalow.

=== Shophouse ===
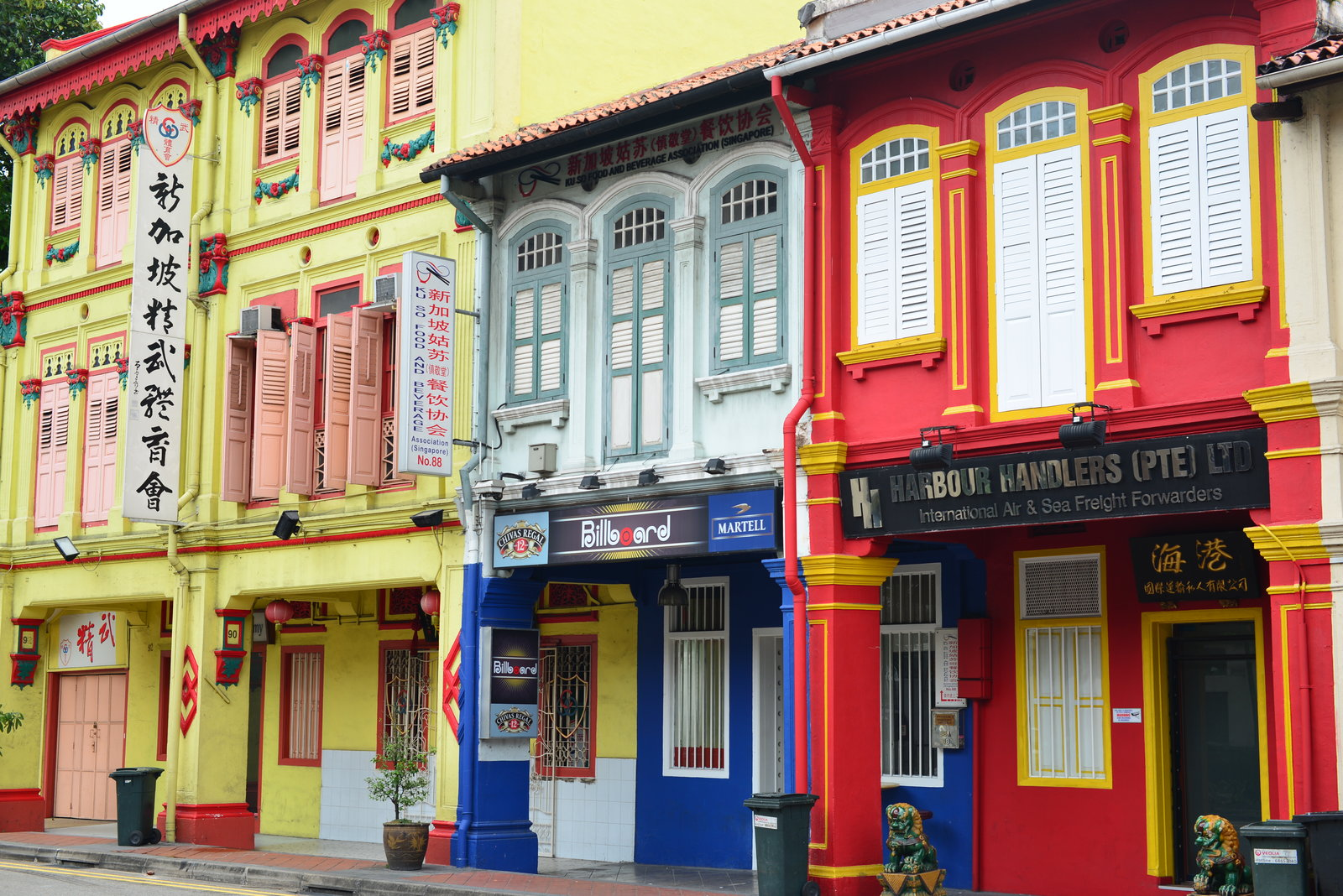
Shophouses in Singapore

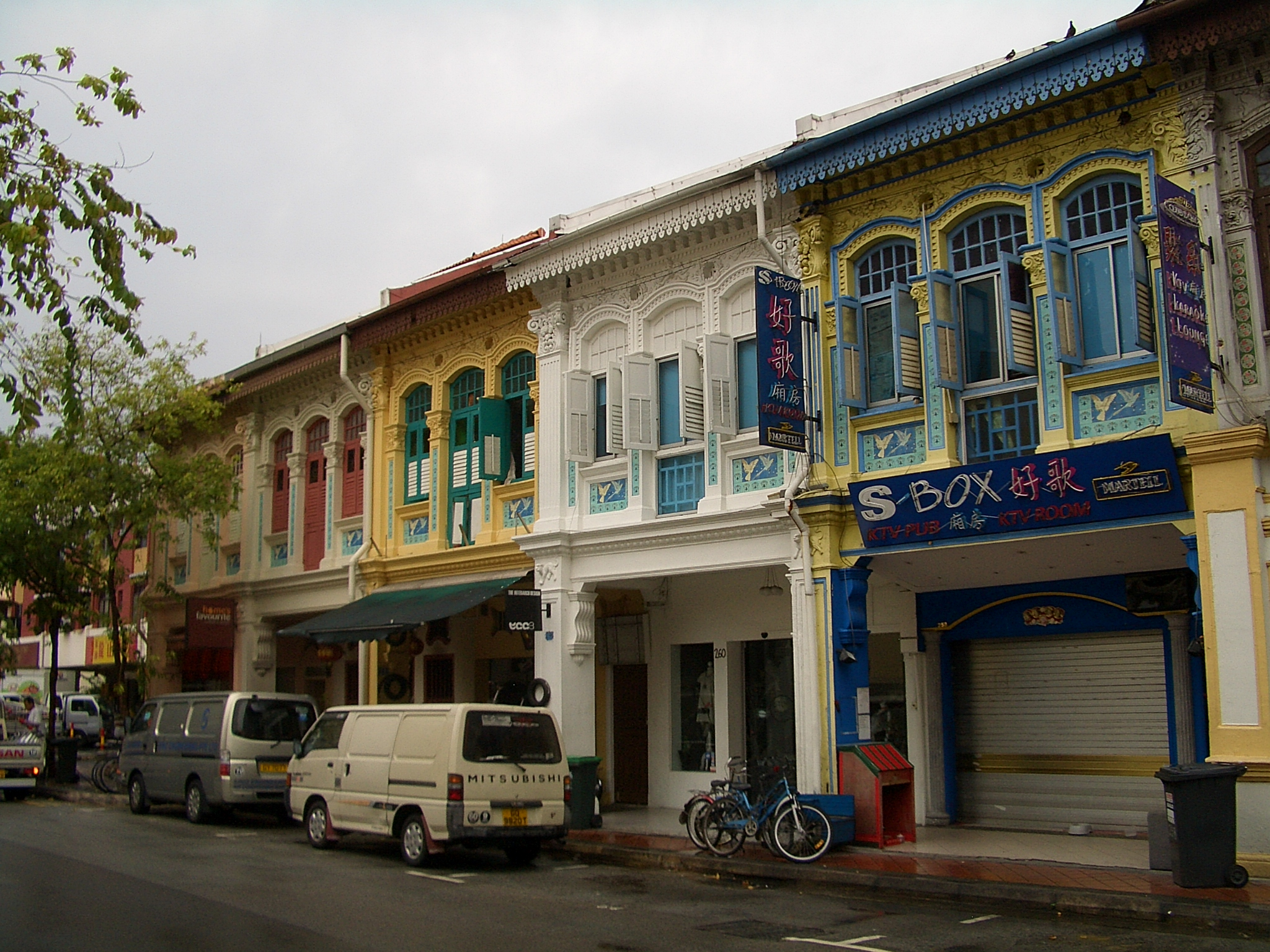
Shophouses in Singapore

The old style shophouses are shops with one or more stories of living accommodation above it. These shophouses typically have a so-called five foot way which is a covered walkway located in front of the shop doors, with the upper floors shielding the pedestrians from the elements. This is a result of the Raffles Town Plan (1822) for Singapore with the stipulation that "all houses constructed of brick or tiles have a common type of front each having an arcade of a certain depth, open to all sides as a continuous and open passage on each side of the street".

=== Black and white bungalow ===
The black and white bungalows were once the residences of the wealthy, colonial government officials or members of the British army. These buildings typically have whitewashed walls, and black painted wood or detailing.

=== Traditional places of worship ===
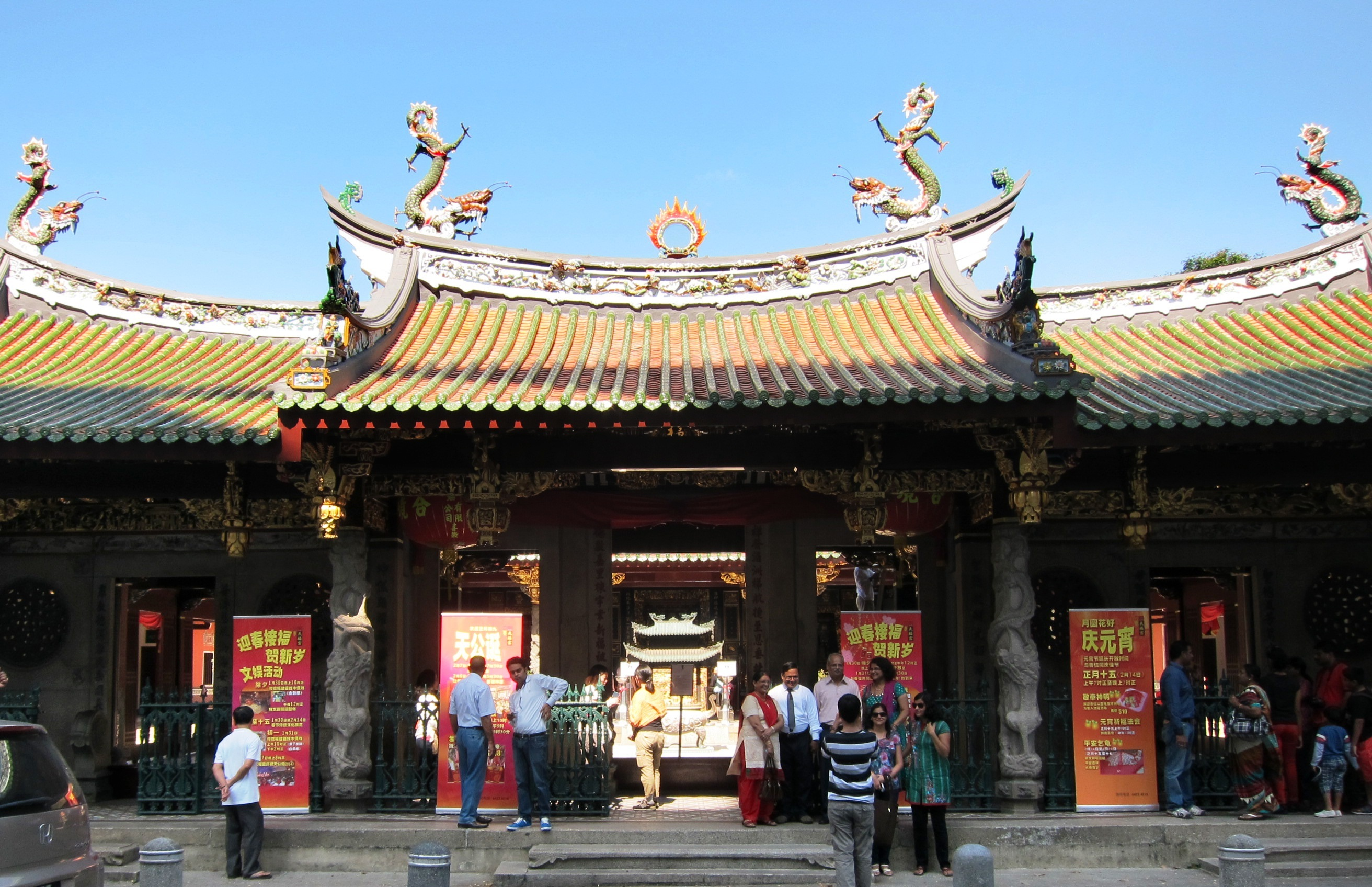
Thian Hock Keng Temple

Another prominent category of buildings in the colonial period were places of worship. As a multi-religious port-city, with migrants from all over the world, a variety of different immigrant communities lived and worked in Singapore. These groups often banded together to raise funds to erect their own places of worship, including a variety of syncretic Chinese temples, Hindu temples, Sikh temples, Jewish synagogues, Catholic, Protestant and Orthodox Christian Churches as well as Sunni and Shia mosques.

Apart from being devoted to the various sects and denominations within each religious tradition, these buildings were often built to serve ethnic groups and sub-groups. For examples, while most Muslims in Singapore were and are Malay, some mosques were built in the South Indian style to serve Tamil Muslims. Likewise, several churches were built in a distinctly Chinese style, serving ethnic Chinese congregations.

Several of the oldest and most important places of worship in Singapore have been designated National Monuments of Singapore, and they include the Cathedral of the Good Shepherd, Armenian Church, St Andrew's Cathedral, Thian Hock Keng Temple, Lian Shan Shuang Lin Monastery, Sultan Mosque, Sri Mariamman Temple, Jamae Mosque and Telok Ayer Chinese Methodist Church, amongst others.

=== Civic and commercial buildings ===
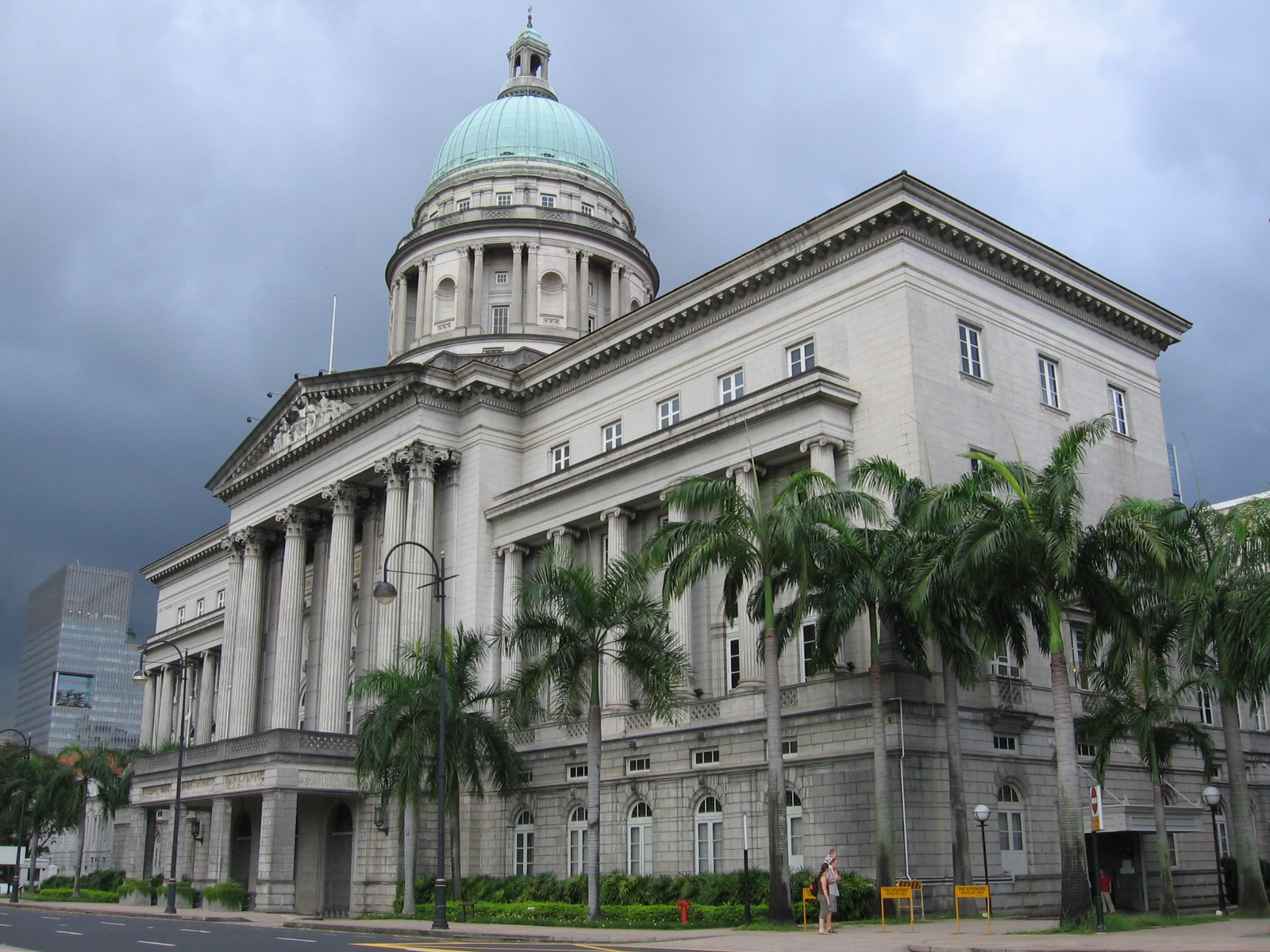
Old Supreme Court Building

Another important group of historic buildings were those built by the colonial government. These were often built in one or another European architectural style, which was in fashion at the time, such as the Palladian, Renaissance, or Neoclassical styles. Some of the more important buildings included the Victoria Theatre and Concert Hall, the Fullerton Building, old Supreme Court Building, City Hall, Singapore, National Museum of Singapore, old Parliament House, Old Hill Street Police Station, Central Fire Station, old Raffles Institution buildings, Changi Prison, old NCO club and numerous other schools, post offices, military camps and police stations around the island.

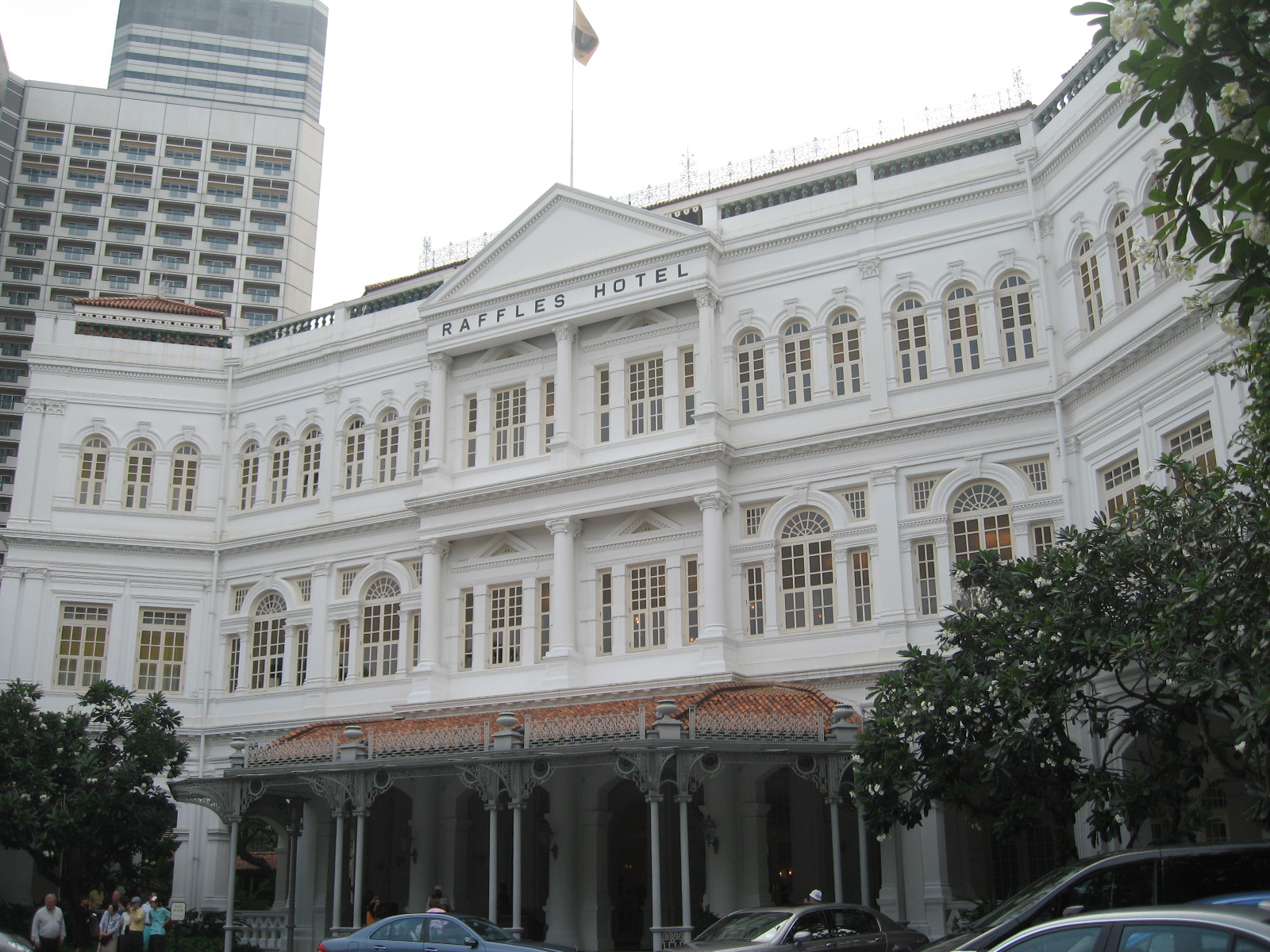
Raffles Hotel

Major commercial buildings, often erected by European businesses as well as mission schools and other civic groups, also adopted these styles, such as the Raffles Hotel, Convent of the Holy Infant Jesus (now CHIJMES), old St Joseph's Institution and old Tao Nan School. Often the approach to matters of style was highly eclectic, and builders combined a variety of stylistic elements from various European, and some non-European, sources in the same building. Many colonial-era buildings are still found in the city, as a result of aggressive conservation efforts of Singapore's built heritage since the 1980s.

=== Art Deco architecture ===
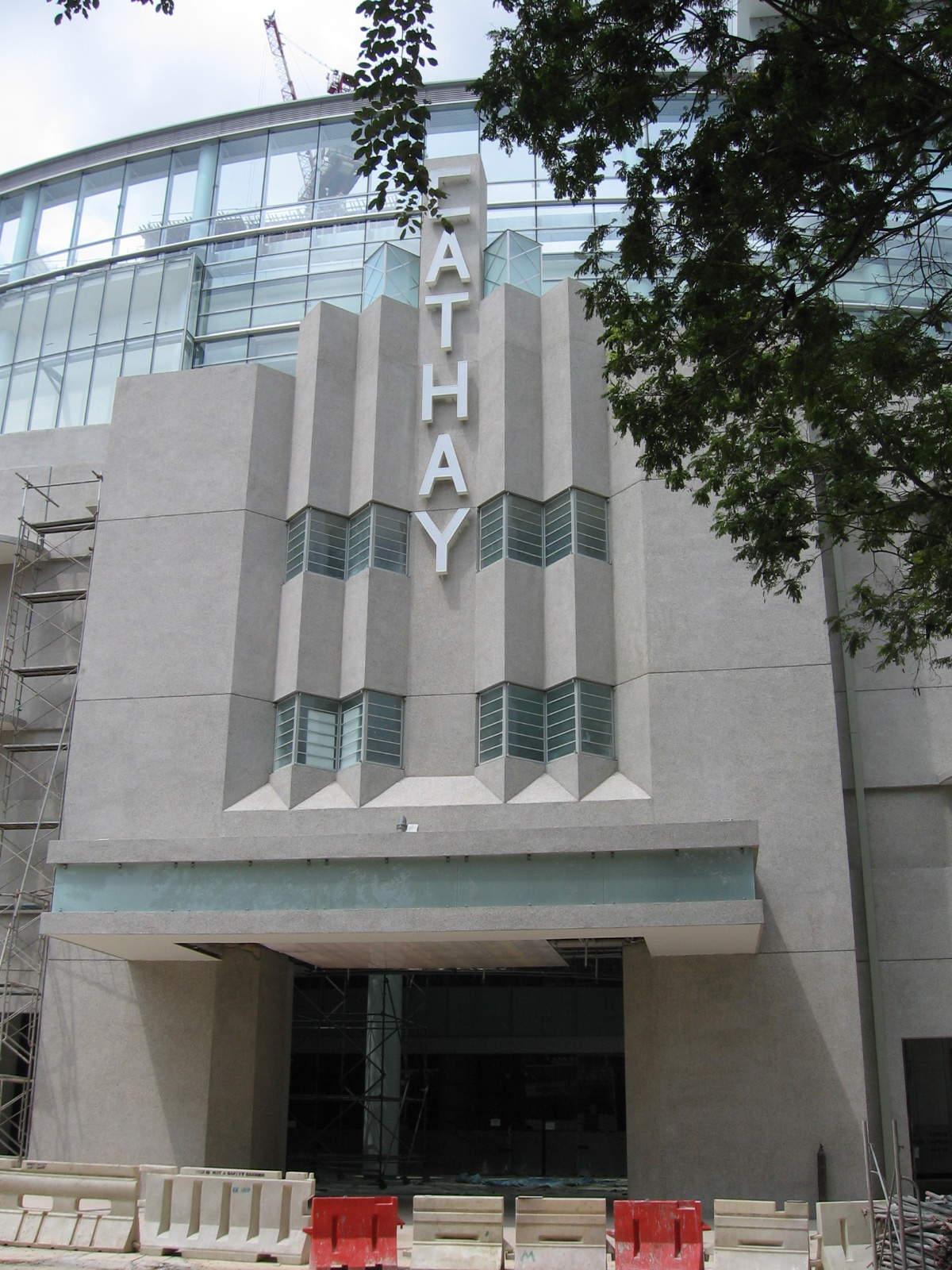
Cathay Building

Singapore has a wealth of Art Deco architecture, dating mainly from the 1920s and 1930s. The style was especially popular in commercial architecture, like factories and offices. Often, Art Deco style ornaments and elements were applied onto otherwise typical shophouses or bungalows. In other cases, Art Deco was applied to newly emergent types of buildings, like Kallang Airport (by the Public Works Department), the Ford Factory (by Emile Brizay), or the Cathay Building (by Frank Brewer) and the Asia Insurance Building (by Ng Keng Siang). Features of this style in the local context included a penchant for inscribing the date of the erection of the building prominently on its facade, the use of projecting horizontal fins as sun shading devices over windows and the use of flagpoles. Quite apart from the aesthetics of this style, the Art Deco period also marked the introduction of modern construction technologies like reinforced concrete in Singapore.

== Post-colonial modern architecture ==
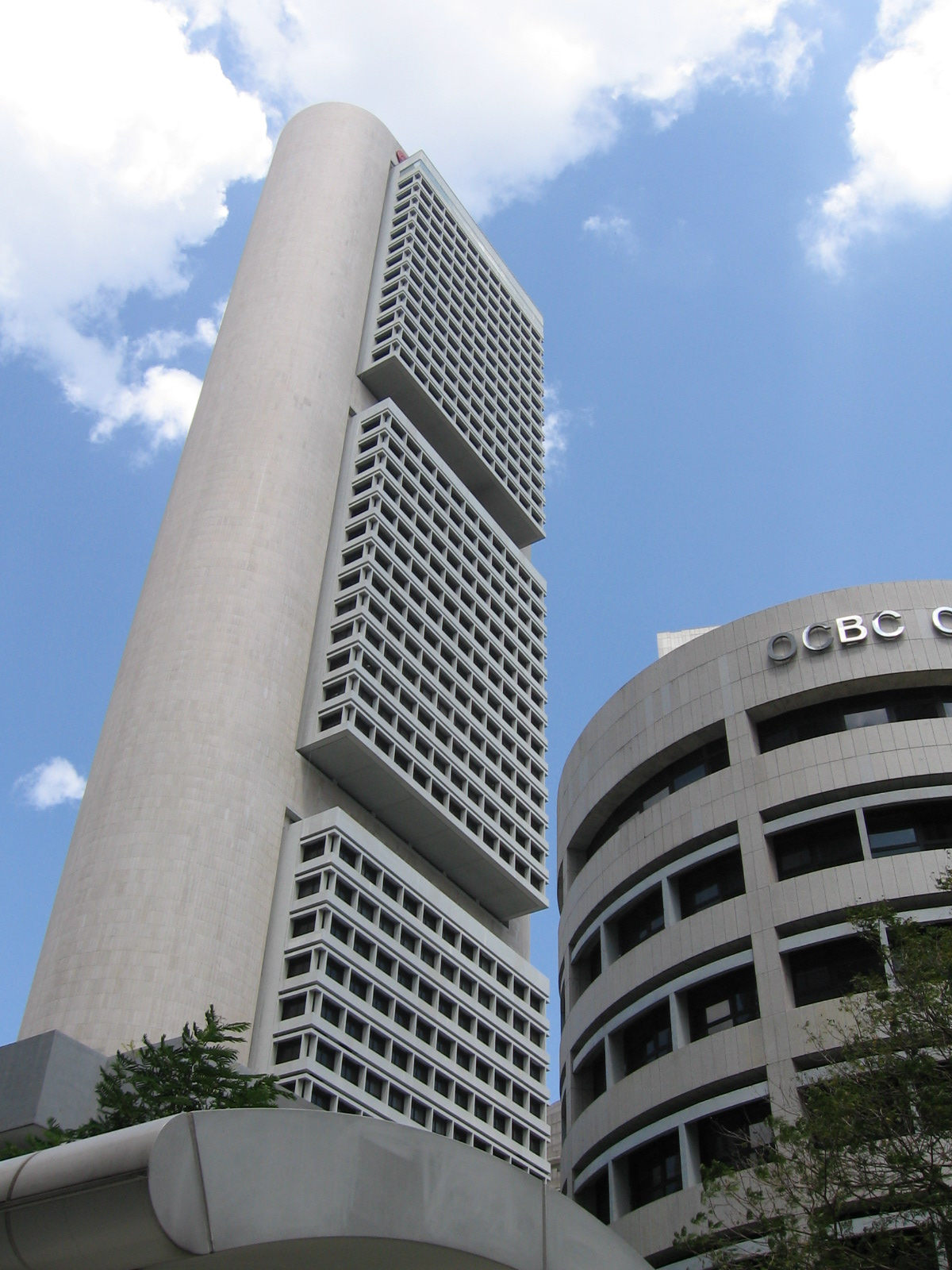
OCBC Centre

Following the Neoclassical and Art Deco phases, Singaporean architecture moved in a decidedly modernist direction after the war. Post-war austerity encouraged the use of clean, stark and simple modernist forms and surfaces devoid of ornament. Modernist architecture was also preferred for the many 'cookie-cutter' or standardised design public buildings being built at the time, such as schools, clinics, factories and especially public housing.

=== Public housing ===
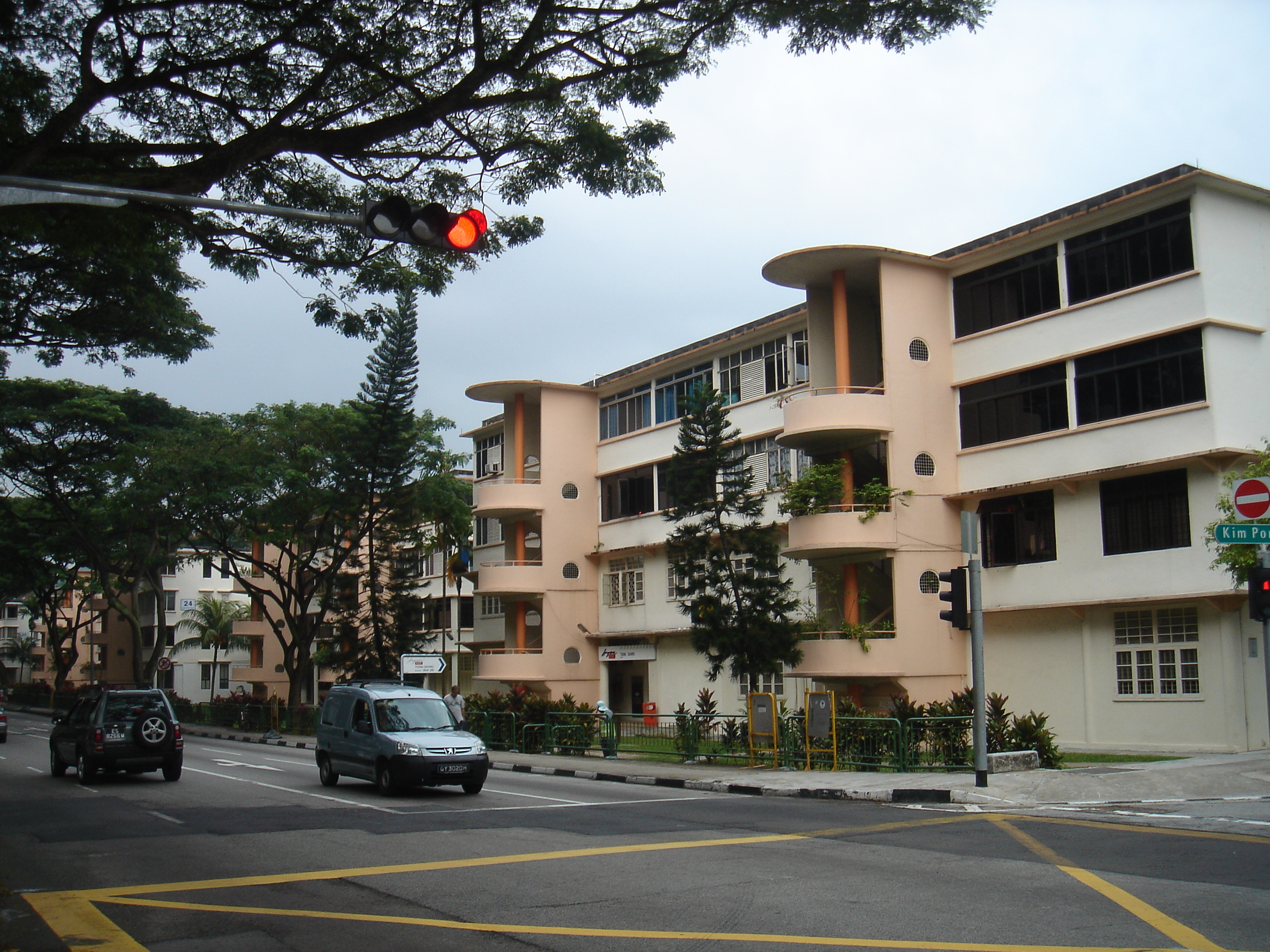
Tiong Bahru SIT-built blocks

Public housing architecture in Singapore dates back to the 1930s with the Singapore Improvement Trust (SIT), a colonial government agency, embarked on a building programme to address a shortage of affordable housing in Singapore. Initially, the SIT focussed on housing middle and lower-middle class Asians. The most prominent example of their pre-war efforts was the Tiong Bahru estate, where many low-rise, four-storey Art Deco style apartment blocks, shops, markets and other amenities were built on the city fringe. This programme continued after the war, with the Art Deco style exchanged for a simple modern aesthetic. Although the estate was popular and praised for spacious and green communal areas as well as attractively designed blocks, the rate of construction was slow in relation to the scale of the housing shortage in Singapore.

After the People's Action Party came to power in 1959, it embarked on a massive public housing programme, which was one of its signature campaign promises. It replaced the SIT with the Housing and Development Board (HDB). The HDB was given the legal tools and financial resources needed to make great progress in speeding up the building of public housing. Architecturally, this resulted in a relatively homogenous suburban landscape, where satellite new towns (modelled after the British), were built with seemingly endless stacks of slab blocks housing tens of thousands of peoples in small two and three-bedroom flats.

=== Skyscrapers ===
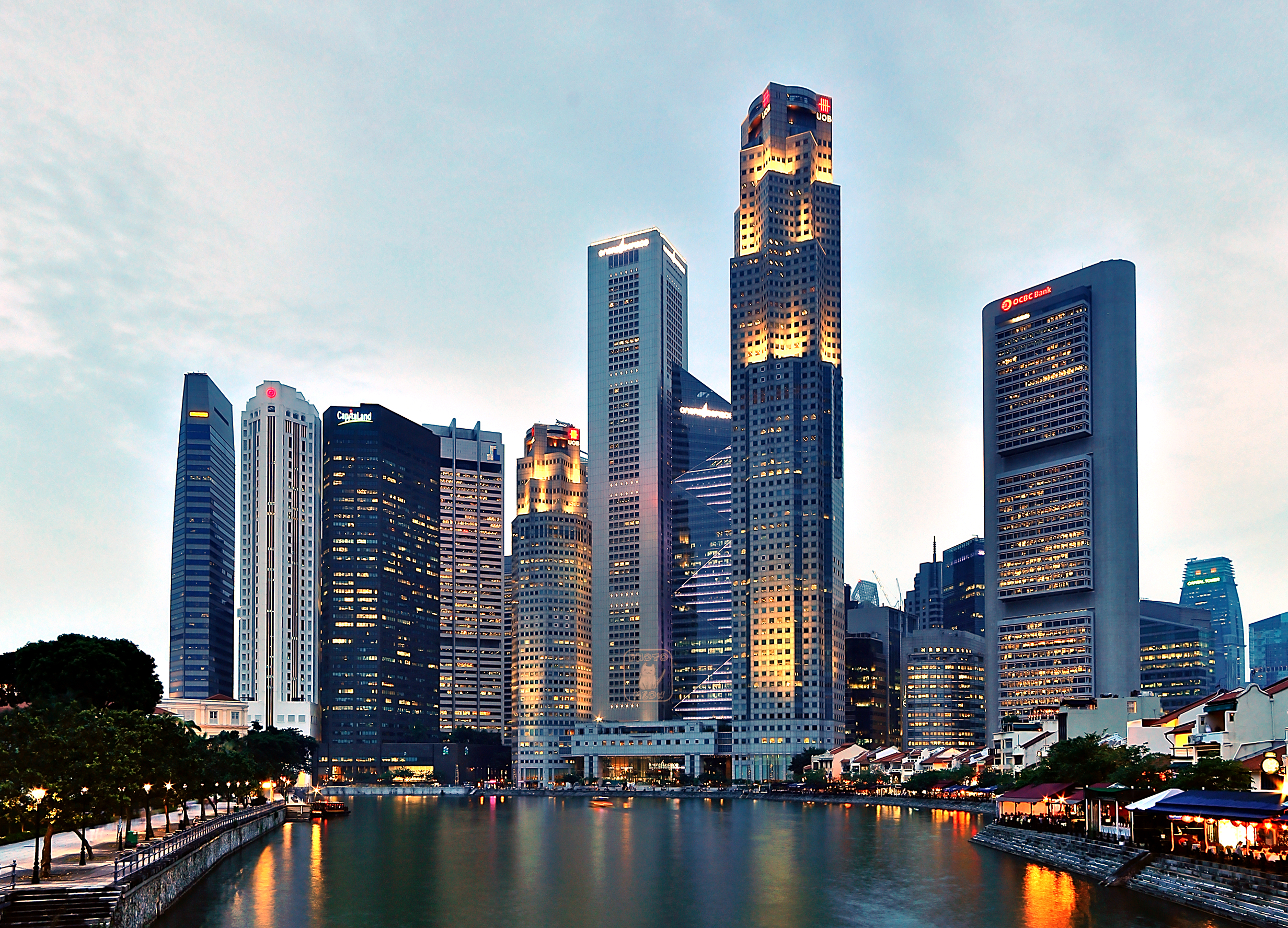
A view of the skyline of Singapore

From the 1970s to late 1980s the city was dominated by modern architecture, particularly the Brutalist style. This is seen in some of the older commercial skyscrapers, such as the OCBC Centre by I. M. Pei, as well as many buildings built to house governmental offices and government-linked companies, including the Singapore Land Tower, Temasek Tower, DBS Building, and the CPF Building. Changing international architectural trends also introduced some architectural styles (particularly the postmodernist style) here.

Among the tallest buildings in Singapore are One Raffles Place, Republic Plaza, and the twin towers of UOB Plaza. In 2016, the tallest building Tanjong Pagar Centre was built. Due to the proximity to Paya Lebar Airbase, buildings were limited to a height of 280 metres, except for Tanjong Pagar area. The tallest residential building in Singapore is the Marina Bay Tower.

== Contemporary architecture ==
In the 21st century, Singapore architecture has embraced international architectural stylistic movements from postmodernism and high-tech architecture. In addition, local variants of Critical regionalism have been developed, taking into account Singapore's unique tropical climate and dense urban fabric.

=== Distinctive structures ===
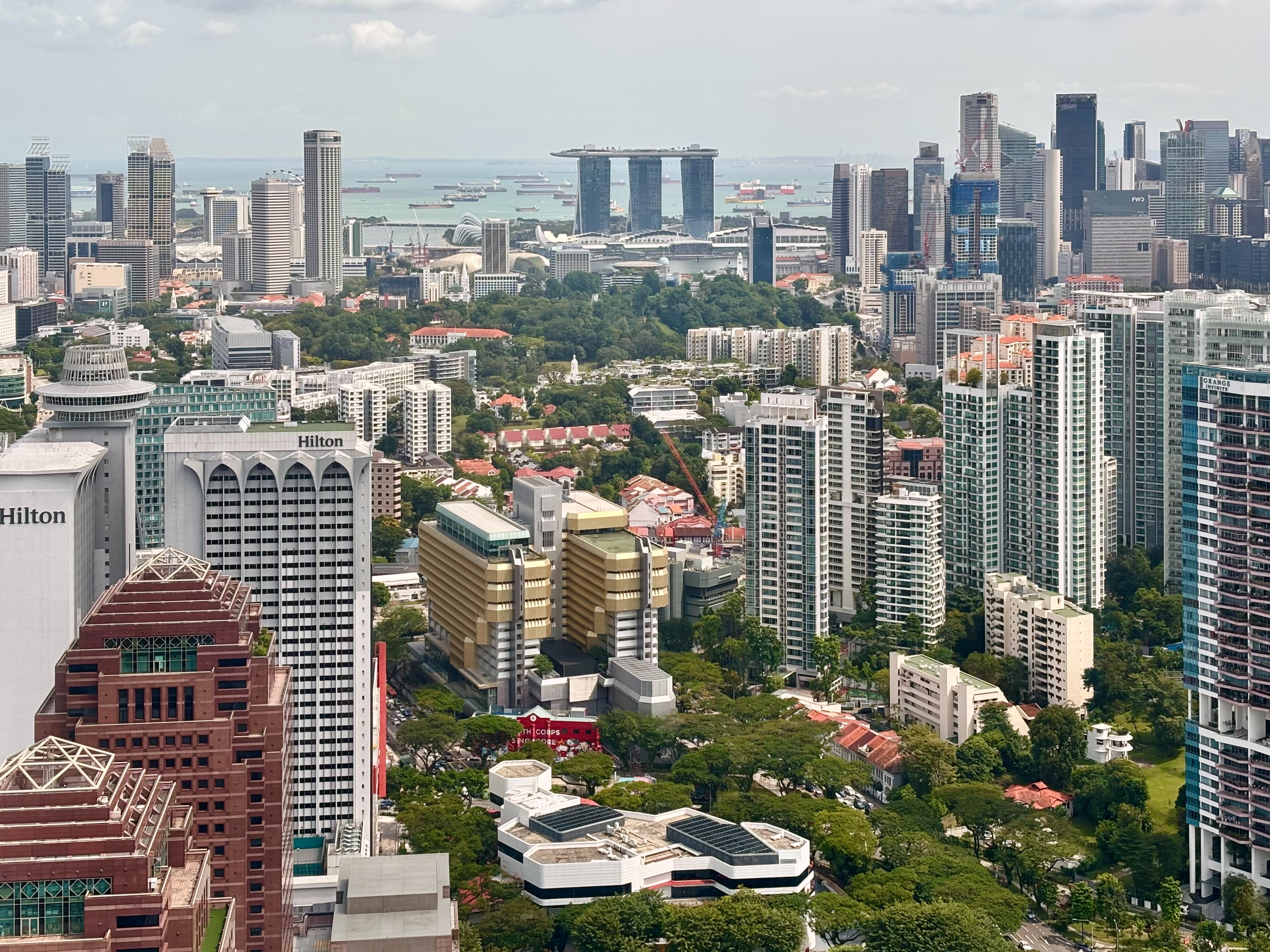
Cityscape from ION Orchard with three towers of Marina Bay Sands visible

A number of projects were initiated to create distinctive landmark buildings, unique structures, as well as interesting features and attractions in Singapore. Many of these developments can be found in the Marina Bay area, where one objective in its master plan is to create a distinctive image for the waterfronts as international landmarks. These developments include Marina Bay Sands, ArtScience Museum, the Helix Bridge, Gardens by the Bay, and in particular, the show piece arts centre Esplanade - Theatres on the Bay.

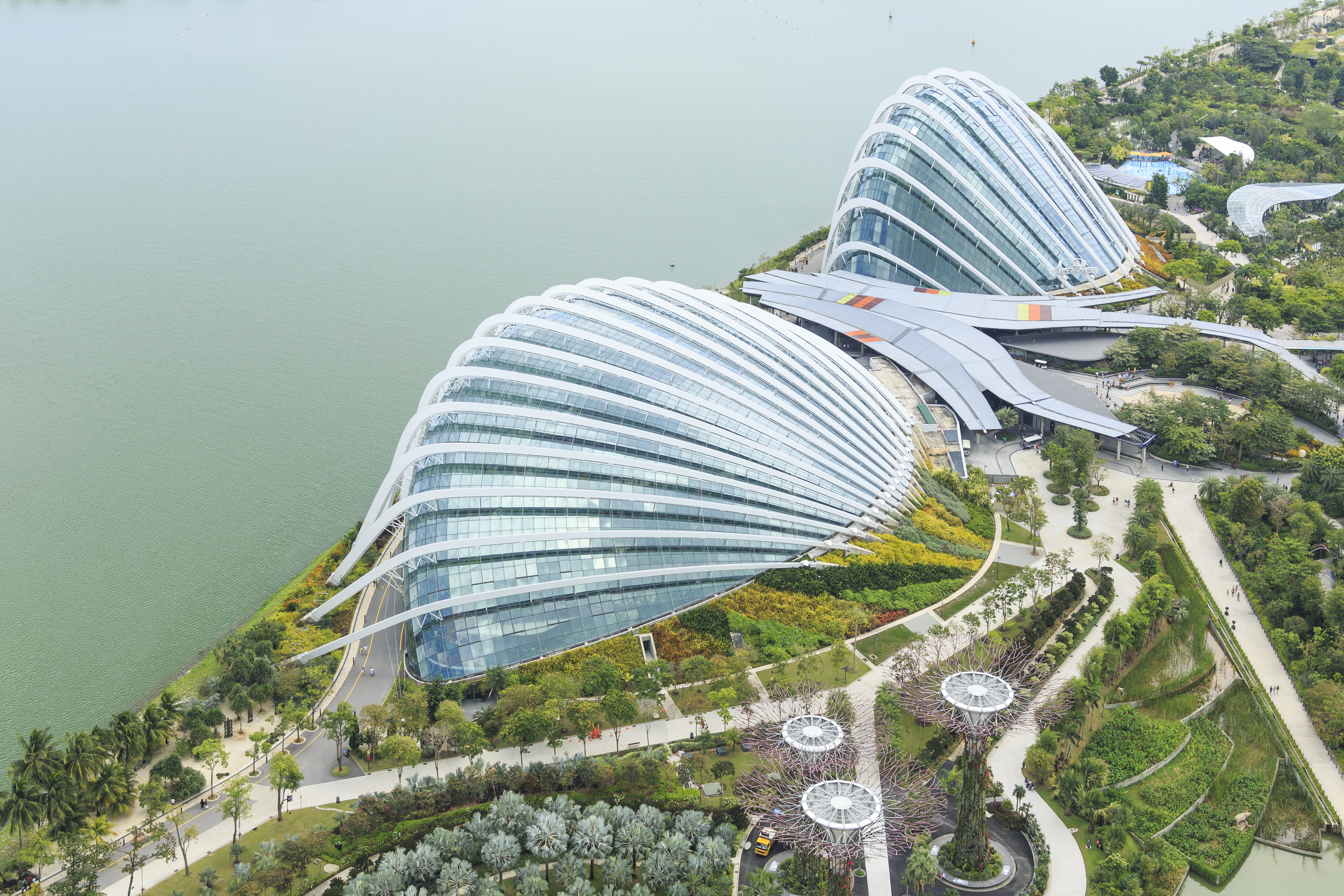
Gardens by the Bay

Others include residential complexes, such as Reflections at Keppel Bay and The Interlace, and public projects, such as Southern Ridges.

=== Critical regionalism ===
Architects in Singapore during the early 21st century were among the early proponents of Critical regionalism, as architects in Singapore's hot and humid tropical climate realised that the glassy, unadorned International Style buildings being proliferated across the world by globalism were not appropriate for the local climatic or cultural context. Architects such as Kerry Hill pioneered this form of modern tropical architecture, blending the architectural vernacular of Modernism with naturally-ventilated tropical spaces and Asian cultural references.

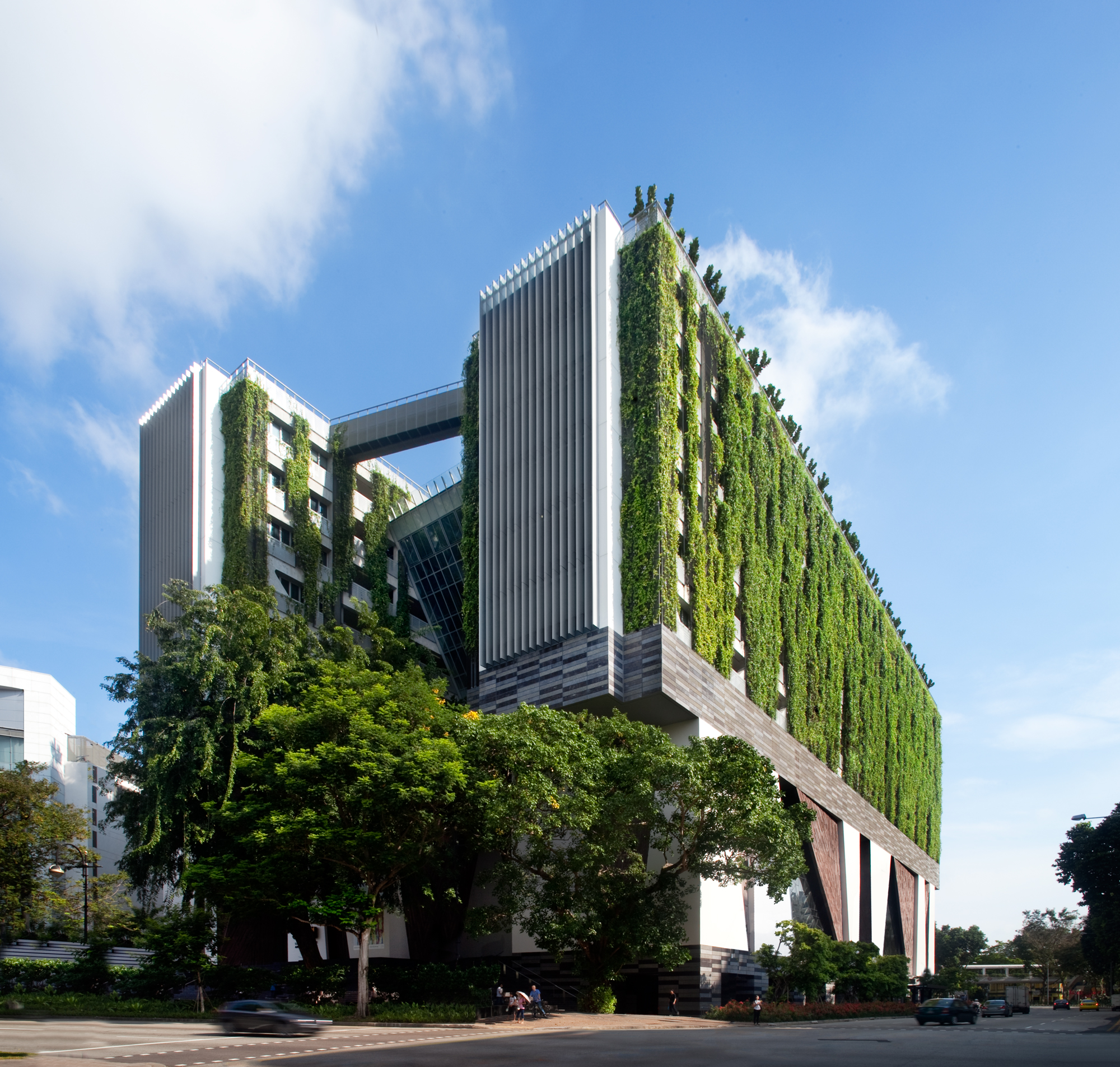
School of the Arts, Singapore 2005–2010

Contemporary Singaporean architects are developing a local form of Critical regionalism in line with the Singapore government's ambitions to create a 'City in a Garden', where development sites commonly yield more public green space than the site area itself. Designers including international award-winning WOHA Architects have pioneered developing new types of green skyscrapers.

== Historic preservation ==
The Urban Redevelopment Authority has designated 94 conservation areas that preserve the built heritage of Singapore. These areas protect 7,091 buildings across the city that showcase distinct and historic architecture. Developers must take conservation guidelines into account to retain historic buildings' original structure and elements, ensuring period styles are maintained.

The National Heritage Board has designated more than 70 specific buildings and landmarks as national monuments for their special value, many for their architectural significance.

== See also ==
- Landmark sites in Singapore
- List of buildings and structures in Singapore
