= List of buildings and structures in Singapore =

This is a list of buildings and structures in Singapore. See respective sections for more detailed lists.

== Singapore from end to end ==
- Tiger Sky Tower

== Arts venues ==
- Esplanade - Theatres on the Bay
- Parliament House, Singapore

== Bridges ==
- List of bridges in Singapore

== Convention centres ==
- Changi Exhibition Centre
- Singapore Expo
- Suntec Singapore International Convention and Exhibition Centre

== Government buildings ==
- City Hall, Singapore
- Istana (as Government House from 1867 to 1959)
- Police Cantonment Complex
- Sri Temasek

=== Former government buildings ===
- Victoria Theatre and Concert Hall
- Old Supreme Court Building, Singapore

== Health specialist centres ==
- List of hospitals in Singapore

== Hotels ==
- List of hotels in Singapore
- Parkroyal on Pickering
- Raffles Hotel
- Raffles The Plaza
- Swissôtel The Stamford
- Gallery Hotel

== Libraries ==
- List of libraries in Singapore
- National Library, Singapore

== Military ==
- Fort Canning

== Museums and memorials ==
- List of memorials in Singapore
- List of museums in Singapore
- Asian Civilisations Museum
- Raffles Museum of Biodiversity Research
- Singapore Science Centre
- Sun Yat Sen Nanyang Memorial Hall

== Prisons ==
- Changi Prison

== Railway stations ==
- List of Singapore MRT stations
- List of Singapore LRT stations
- Tanjong Pagar railway station

== Religious sites ==
=== Buddhist temples ===
- Burmese Buddhist Temple
- Foo Hai Ch'an Monastery
- Hai Inn Temple
- Kong Meng San Phor Kark See Monastery
- Lian Shan Shuang Lin Monastery
- Palelai Buddhist Temple
- Poh Ern Shih Temple
- Sakya Muni Buddha Gaya Temple
- Singapore Buddhist Lodge
- Sri Lankaramaya Buddhist Temple
- Wat Ananda Metyarama Thai Buddhist Temple

=== Chinese religious pilgrimage site ===
- Kusu Island

=== Chinese temples ===
- Ang Chee Sia Ong Temple
- Chan Chor Min Tong
- Fo Shan Ting Da Bo Gong Temple (Pulau Ubin)
- German Girl Shrine (Pulau Ubin)
- Hong San See
- Jin Long Si Temple
- Kwan Im Thong Hood Cho Temple
- Tan Si Chong Su
- Thian Hock Keng
- Tou Mu Kung Temple
- Yueh Hai Ching Temple

=== Churches ===
- List of Roman Catholic churches in Singapore
- Saint Andrew's Cathedral, Singapore
- Kampong Kapor Methodist Church
- Orchard Road Presbyterian Church
- Prinsep Street Presbyterian Church
- Telok Ayer Chinese Methodist Church
- Wesley Methodist Church, Singapore

=== Indian temples ===
- Sri Mariamman Temple

=== Mosques ===
- List of mosques in Singapore
- Masjid Al-Istiqamah
- Masjid Hajjah Fatimah
- Masjid Jamae
- Masjid Sultan

== Schools ==
- List of schools in Singapore

== Stadiums ==
- List of stadiums in Singapore
- National Stadium, Singapore

== Other structures ==
- 124 and 126 St. Patrick's Road
- Merlion
- Pearl Bank Apartments
- Singapore Flyer

== See also ==
- Black and white bungalow
- National Monuments of Singapore
- Shophouse
- List of tallest buildings in Singapore
- List of buildings
