= Singapore Sports Museum =

Museum in Singapore

Coordinates: 1°18′2.5″N 103°52′27.2″E

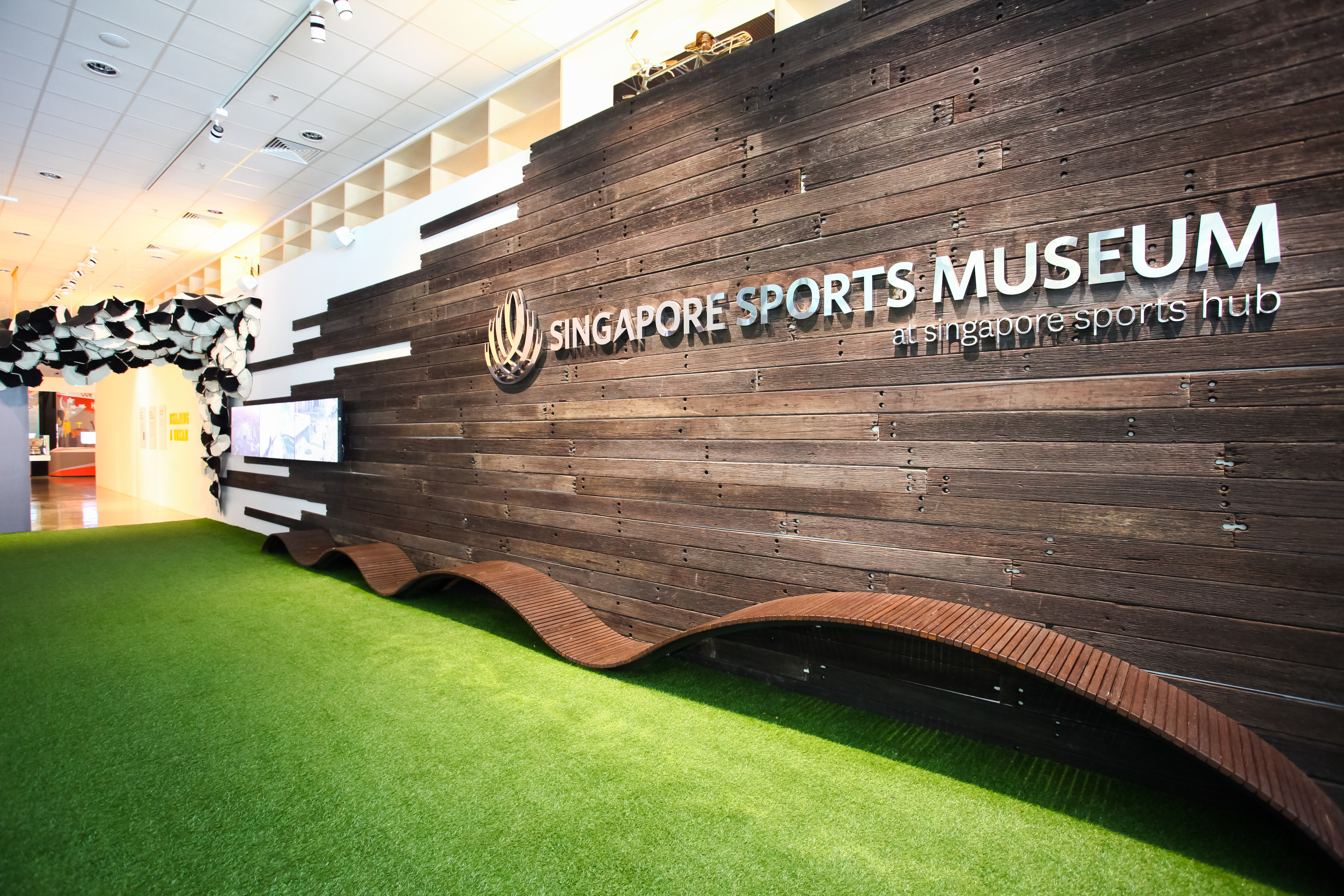
The Singapore Sports Museum at the National Stadium, Singapore.

The Singapore Sports Museum is a sports museum in Singapore, located at the Singapore Sports Hub in Kallang.

The Singapore Sports Museum is affiliated to the International Association of Sports Museums and Hall of Fame (IASMHF) based in the United States since 1984. It is also a member of the Museum Roundtable, set up by the National Heritage Board.

== History ==
The Singapore Sports Museum was established in 1983 at the former National Stadium to preserve and showcase Singapore's sporting heritage. It was opened to the public in May 1983 to coincide with the staging of the 1983 Southeast Asian Games in Singapore. In 2007, its collection was temporarily moved to the Singapore Sports Council's (SSC) temporary office and heritage corners of selected SSC sports and recreation centres such as Jurong West and Sengkang, while a new iteration of the museum was constructed as part of the Singapore Sports Hub project, originally expected to be completed by 2011.

The rebuilt museum reopened on 6 October 2014, which added new interactive exhibits, an exhibit paying tribute to the former National Stadium, and a new Singapore Youth Olympic Museum.

== Galleries ==
In total, there were 6 galleries. Displays at the Sports Museum included both Olympic and non-Olympic sports, along with traditional and indigenous games and pastimes:

- Gallery 1: Sports in Colonial Times
- Gallery 2: Sports in Independent Singapore
- Gallery 3: Indigenous and Traditional Sports
- Gallery 4: Hall of Fame
- Gallery 5: Olympism & Regional/International Games
- Gallery 6: Roll of Honour

== See also ==
- List of museums in Singapore
