= Richard Tenguerian =

Armenian American architect

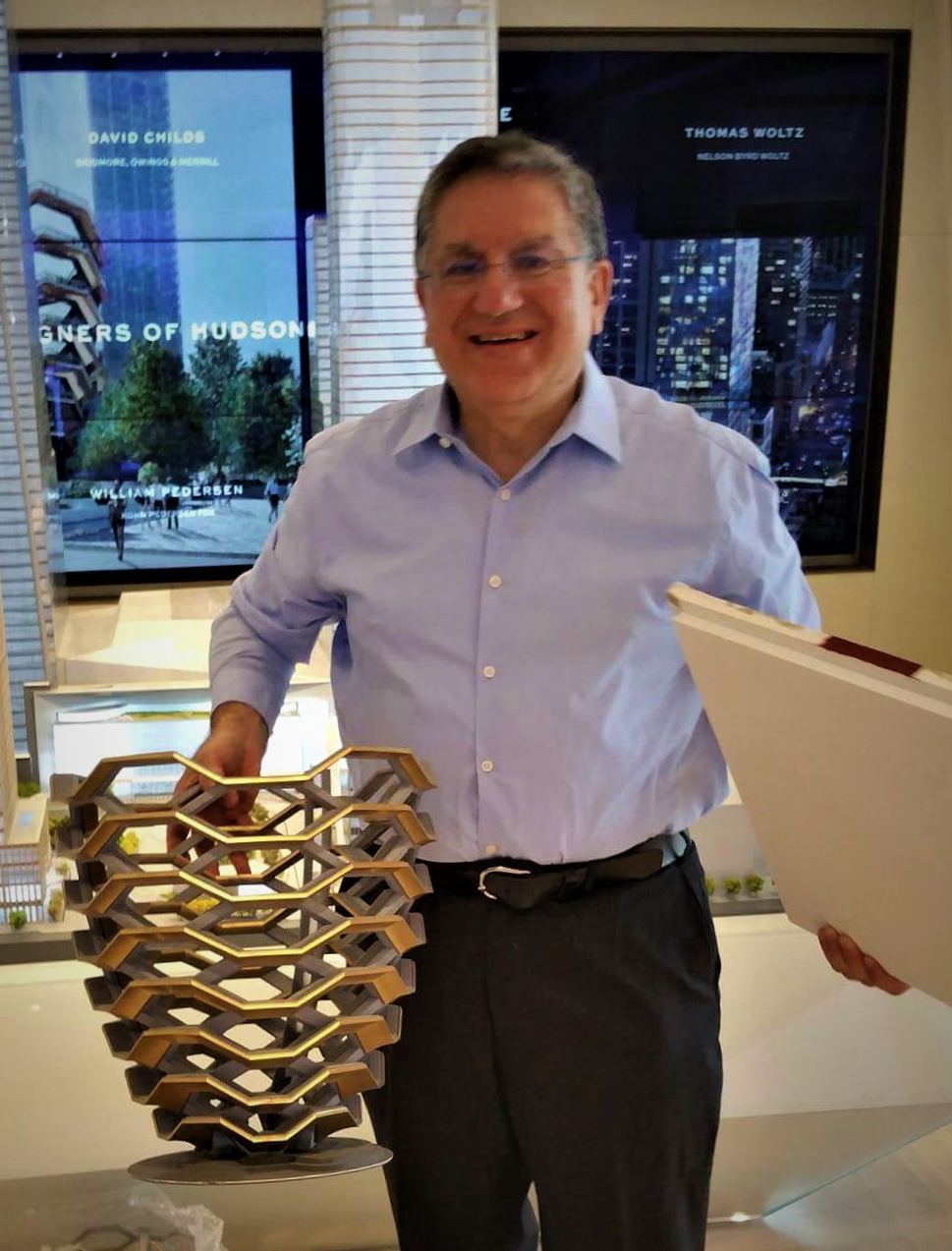
- Richard holding a model he created for the Vessel in NYC
- Born: 3 August 1955 (age 71); Aleppo, Syria
- Occupation: Architect

Richard Tenguerian (Armenian: Տիգրան Թընկըրեան; born, August 3, 1955) is an architectural model maker of Armenian descent. Some of his notable physical models include the Kingdom Center in Riyadh (1998), Yankee Stadium in New York (2006), The Sail @ Marina Bay in Singapore (2007), and Comcast Center in Philadelphia (2008). More recently, he has made architectural models for the New Tappan Zee Bridge in New York (2013), CBS Sixty Minutes, and the Hudson Yards Redevelopment Project in New York (2014). He is the founding principal of Tenguerian Models and resides in New York City.

== Early life ==
Richard Tenguerian was born in Aleppo, Syria. His parents are survivors of the Armenian genocide. His father, Antranig Tenguerian, was a sculptor and his mother, Mary Tenguerian, was a fashion designer who worked for Chanel Studio in Lebanon.

At age 14, while working at an architectural office in Lebanon, Tenguerian made his first architectural model. He applied to the American University in Beirut, but the 1975 Lebanese Civil War thwarted his intentions.

== Career ==
At age 21, Tenguerian moved to New York City, where he worked as a model maker while studying architecture at the Pratt Institute. He began working as a model maker, and built a reputation in the architectural community, which helped him finance his undergraduate education. He earned a bachelor's degree in architecture from the Pratt Institute.

Encouraged by the high demand for model makers in the architectural community, Richard started his own company, becoming a pioneer in the field. During his career, Tenguerian collaborated with architects including Philip Johnson, Aldo Rossi, Bernard Tschumi, Emilio Ambasz and Robert A. M. Stern.

Tenguerian has produced architectural models for projects in the United States and internationally, including developments in Dubai, Singapore, Vietnam and other markets.

== Selected models ==
- Riverside Office Building, Burbank (1997)
- Kingdom Center, Riyadh (1998)
- Newseum, Washington, D.C. (2006)
- Yankee Stadium, New York (2006)
- Sail @ Marina Bay, Singapore (2007)
- Comcast Center, Philadelphia (2008)
- Qatar Financial Center, Doha (2009)
- Sabah al-Salem University, Kuwait (2009)
- Lincoln Center Development (2009)
- New York City Police Academy, New York (2012)
- Tappan Zee Bridge, New York (2013)
- Hudson Yards Redevelopment Project, New York (2014)
- Empire State Building, New York (2019)
