= List of museums in Singapore =

This is a list of museums in Singapore:

== National museums ==
- 8Q SAM
- Asian Civilisations Museum (ACM)
- National Gallery Singapore
- National Museum of Singapore
- Peranakan Museum
- Singapore Art Museum (SAM)

== Other museums ==
- Air Force Museum
- ArtScience Museum (Marina Bay Sands)
- Baba House (National University of Singapore)
- The Battle Box
- Children's Museum Singapore
- Fort Siloso (Sentosa)
- Former Ford Factory
- Fuk Tak Chi Museum
- Images of Singapore (Sentosa)
- The Intan
- JCU Museum of Video and Computer Games
- Lee Kong Chian Natural History Museum (National University of Singapore)
- Little Mori's Silkworm Museum
- Madame Tussauds Singapore (Sentosa)
- Mint Museum of Toys
- NUS Museum (National University of Singapore)
- Red Dot Design Museum Singapore
- The Republic of Singapore Navy Museum
- Sports Museum
- The Gem Museum
- Trick Eye Museum
- The Live Turtle and Tortoise Museum
- Buddha Tooth Relic and Temple Museum
- Hell's Museum
- Museum of Ice Cream Singapore
- Fort Canning Heritage Gallery
- Singapore Musical Box Museum
- MINT Museum of Toys
- Ode To Art
- Singapore Chinese Opera Museum
- Vintage Camera Museum

== Heritage institutions ==
- Chinatown Heritage Centre
- Chinese Heritage Centre
- Civil Defence Heritage Gallery
- Heritage Conservation Centre {HCC)
- Indian Heritage Centre (IHC)
- Malay Heritage Centre
- National Archives of Singapore (NAS)
- Police Heritage Centre
- Reflections at Bukit Chandu (RBC)
- Science Centre Singapore
- Singapore Chinese Cultural Centre
- Singapore City Gallery (URA)
- Singapore Discovery Centre
- Sun Yat Sen Nanyang Memorial Hall
- Eurasian Heritage Gallery

== See also ==
- List of memorials in Singapore
- List of tourist attractions in Singapore
