= Vintage Camera Museum =

Singaporean camera museum

Vintage Camera Museums
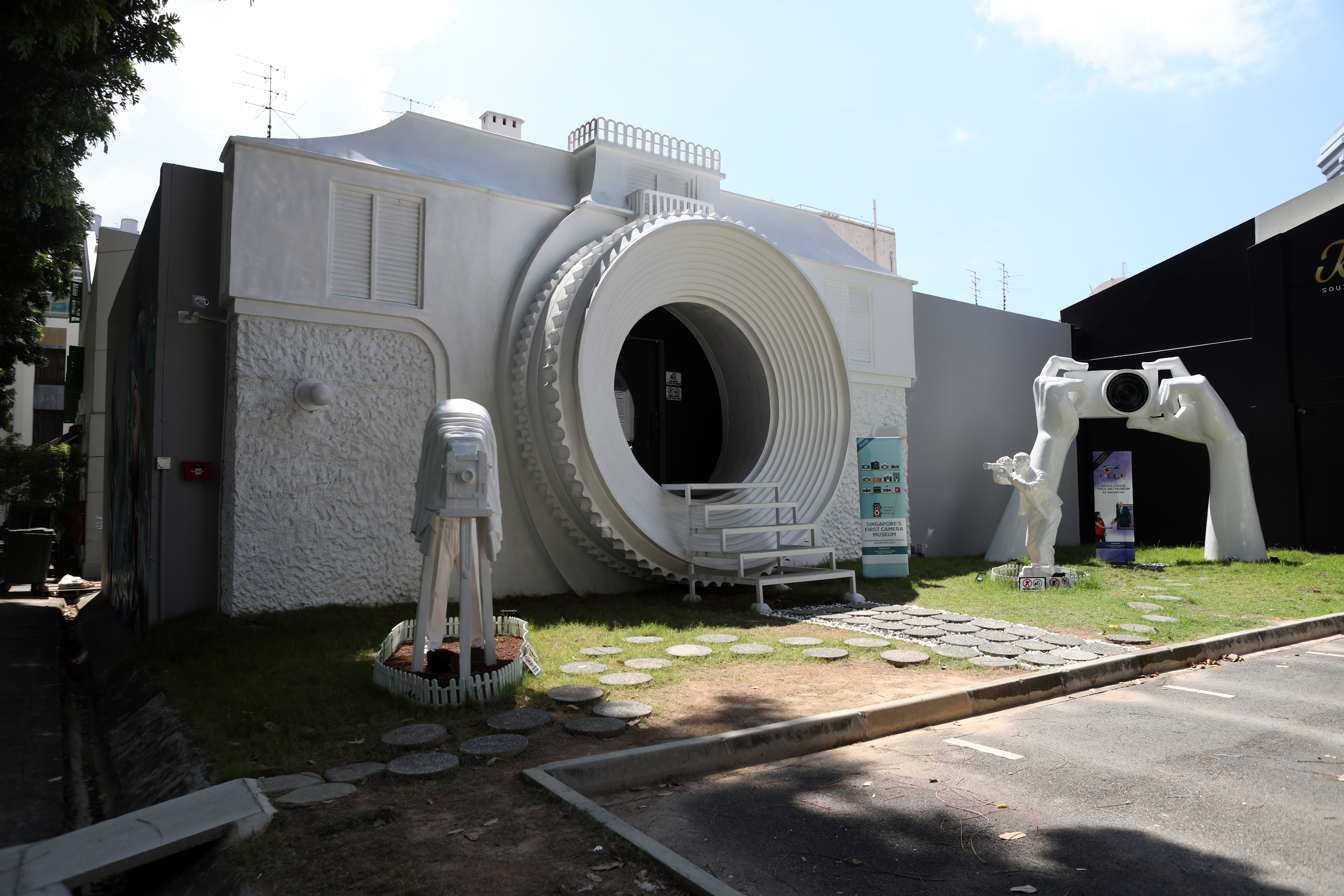
- Facade of the Vintage Camera Museum

- Location within Singapore
- Established: 1 June 2017; 9 years ago
- Location: 8C Jalan Kledek, Singapore 199263
- Coordinates: 1.303486°N 103.8568053°E
- Type: Camera museum
- Founders: Solaiyappan Ramanathan; A.P. Shreethar
- Curator: Solaiyappan Ramanathan
- Website: www.vintagecamerasmuseumsg.com

The Vintage Camera Museum is a camera museum in Kampong Glam which is a neighbourhood and ethnic enclave in Singapore.

== History and background ==
Started by steel trader Solaiyappan Ramanathan and his cousin (and artist) A.P. Shreethar, the camera museum opened on 1 June 2017. It was started to educate people the evolution of camera. The exhibits consist of approximately 1,000 cameras from the personal collections of Ramanathan and Shreethar, who both collectively own 7,000 cameras. The cameras are from as far back as the late 19th century all the way to the early 2000s, and include pigeon camera, a Minox spy camera, and Rokuoh-sha Type 89 'Machine Gun' camera that was used by the Japanese as a training weapon during World War II.

The museum was affected by the onset of COVID-19 pandemic in Singapore which it saw a 90% drop in traffic, forcing it to be temporarily closed in 2020.

== Architecture ==
Ramanathan bought a building located at Jalan Kledek and retrofitted it. The façade of the building is shaped after a Rollei camera, and is thus called as the 'world's biggest camera-shaped building'. Housed in the 2,500 sq ft (230 m^{2}) building are the Vintage Camera Museum, and Click Art Museum, which showcases Shreethar's artwork while allowing visitors to experiment photography with the art pieces.

The museum is housed in a white camera-shaped building with a total floor area of 2,500 square feet, divided into two museums – Vintage Camera Museum and Click art Museum.

== See also ==
- List of museums in Singapore
