= List of memorials in Singapore =

This is a list of memorials in Singapore:

- Bukit Batok Memorial
- The Cenotaph
- Civilian War Memorial
- Elephant statue at the Old Parliament House
- Dalhousie Obelisk
- Former Indian National Army Monument
- Kranji War Memorial
- Lim Bo Seng Memorial
- Nanyang University Memorial
- Raffles' Landing Site Statue
- Sun Yat Sen Nanyang Memorial Hall
- Tan Kim Seng Fountain
- SGH War Memorial

== See also ==
- List of museums in Singapore
