= The Sail @ Marina Bay =

Residential skyscraper in Singapore

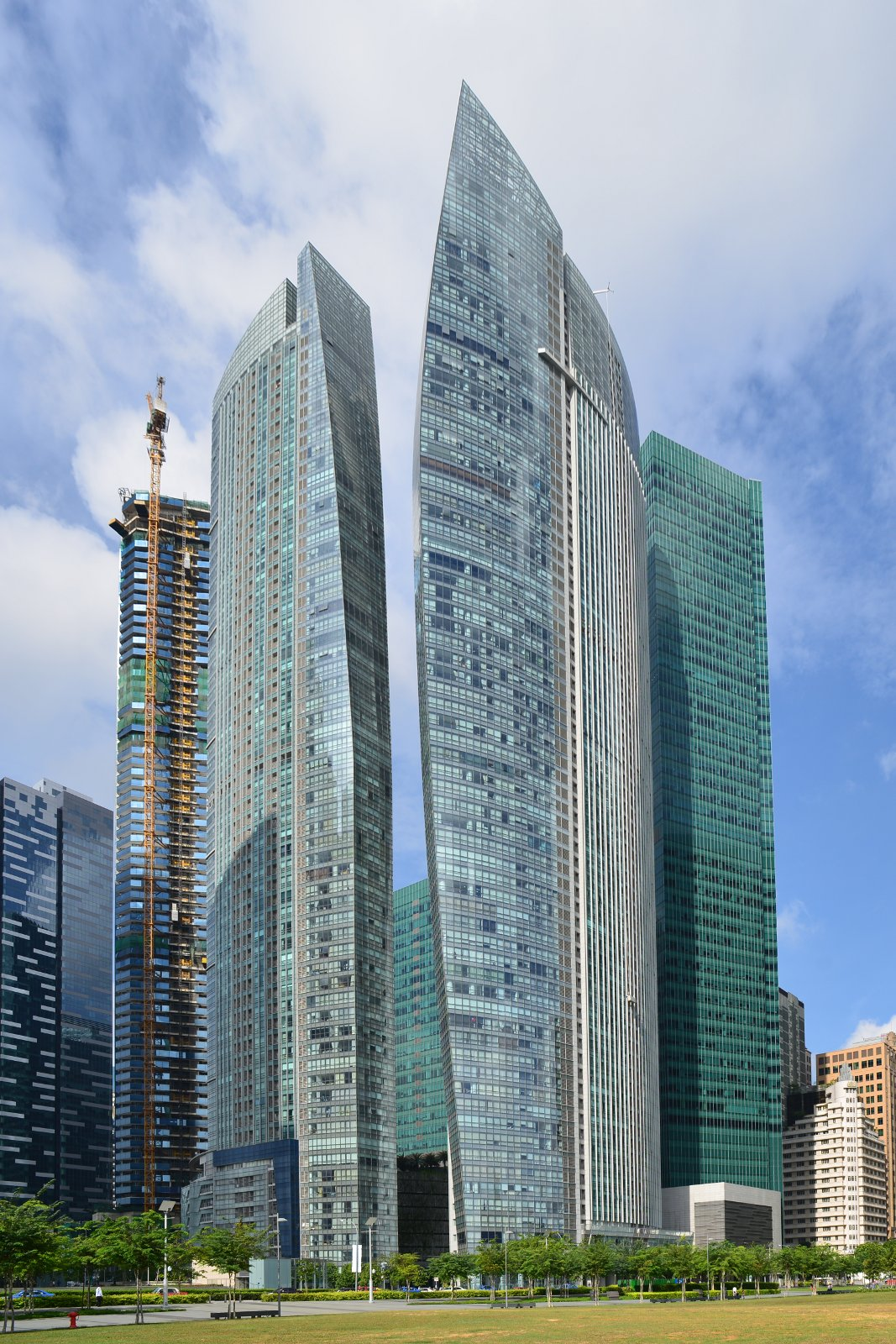
- Interactive map of the The Sail @ Marina Bay area

General information
- Status: Completed
- Type: Residential
- Architectural style: Modernism
- Location: Marina Boulevard, Downtown Core, Singapore
- Coordinates: 1°16′51.97″N 103°51′10.06″E
- Construction started: 2004
- Completed: Marina Bay: 2008; Central Park: 2009
- Owner: City Developments Limited; AIG Global Real Estate
- Operator: City Developments Limited; AIG Global Real Estate

Height
- Roof: Marina Bay: 245 m (804 ft); Central Park: 215 m (705 ft)

Technical details
- Floor count: Marina Bay: 70; Central Park: 63

Design and construction
- Architects: NBBJ; Team Design Architects
- Developer: City Developments Limited; AIG Global Real Estate
- Main contractor: Dragages Singapore Pte Ltd subsidiary of Bouygues

The Sail @ Marina Bay is a waterfront lifestyle condominium located in the Marina Bay area in Singapore. It was completed in 2008. The first tenants moved into Central Park Tower in July 2008. Residents moved into Marina Bay Tower a few weeks later. The structure of The Sail is 245 m (804 ft) with 70 storeys and is one of Singapore's tallest condominia/apartment buildings. This development offers panoramic city view of Marina Bay and the sea. It is close to some of Singapore's famous landmarks such as Suntec City, Marina Bay Sands, Esplanade, Telok Ayer Market and the Singapore River. The Downtown MRT station is built a few meters to the West of the building. The building was erected on reclaimed land, and the Central Linear Park is built on the South Side next to the building.

== History ==
Before the site was sold to developers, City Developments Limited and AIG Global Real Estate, the .90909 ha (2.2464 acres) land parcel was sold as a "white site", which means the developer is free to use the site for commercial and/or residential use, by the URA. After the sale, the developer indicated their intention to use it predominantly for residential use with the first level or two for shop units. Their plan was approved by the government. Once completed, it included the first residential development in the New Downtown and is also the tallest predominantly residential development in the city.

The 99-year leasehold site was launched for public tender on 14 March 2002.

The original design for the building was 69 storeys for Marina Bay Tower, and 58 storeys for Central Park Tower. After the design was finalised by the NBBJ, the number of storeys was revised upwards to 70 storeys for Marina Bay Tower, and 63 storeys for Central Park Tower.

== Design ==
The condominium was designed by Peter Pran and Timothy Johnson with leading design firm NBBJ. The two buildings include a glass facade, sculpted Marina Bay Tower to look like a sail, and configured the complex representative of a huge canyon, reflecting his utilisation of inspirations by the sun, the wind, and the water respectively.

The site area is .90909 ha (2.2464 acres) with a maximum permissible gross floor area of 118,182 m^{2} (1,272,100 sq ft). It has 2,700 m^{2} (29,000 sq ft) of retail space, and an underground link to Raffles Place MRT station, offering 1,111 99-year leasehold residential units, 438 one-bedroom units, 418 two-bedroom units, 175 three-bedroom units, 75 four-bedroom units, and five penthouses, with the largest almost 840 m^{2} (9,000 sq ft).

The architectural model of the structure was made by Richard Tenguerian.

== Construction ==
- The main-contractor, Dragages Singapore Pte Ltd, has allowed for many technical innovations in the design of the towers: seismic design - the towers can resist to earthquakes (although unknown to date in Singapore), construction over the MRT line, construction on a very unstable soil.
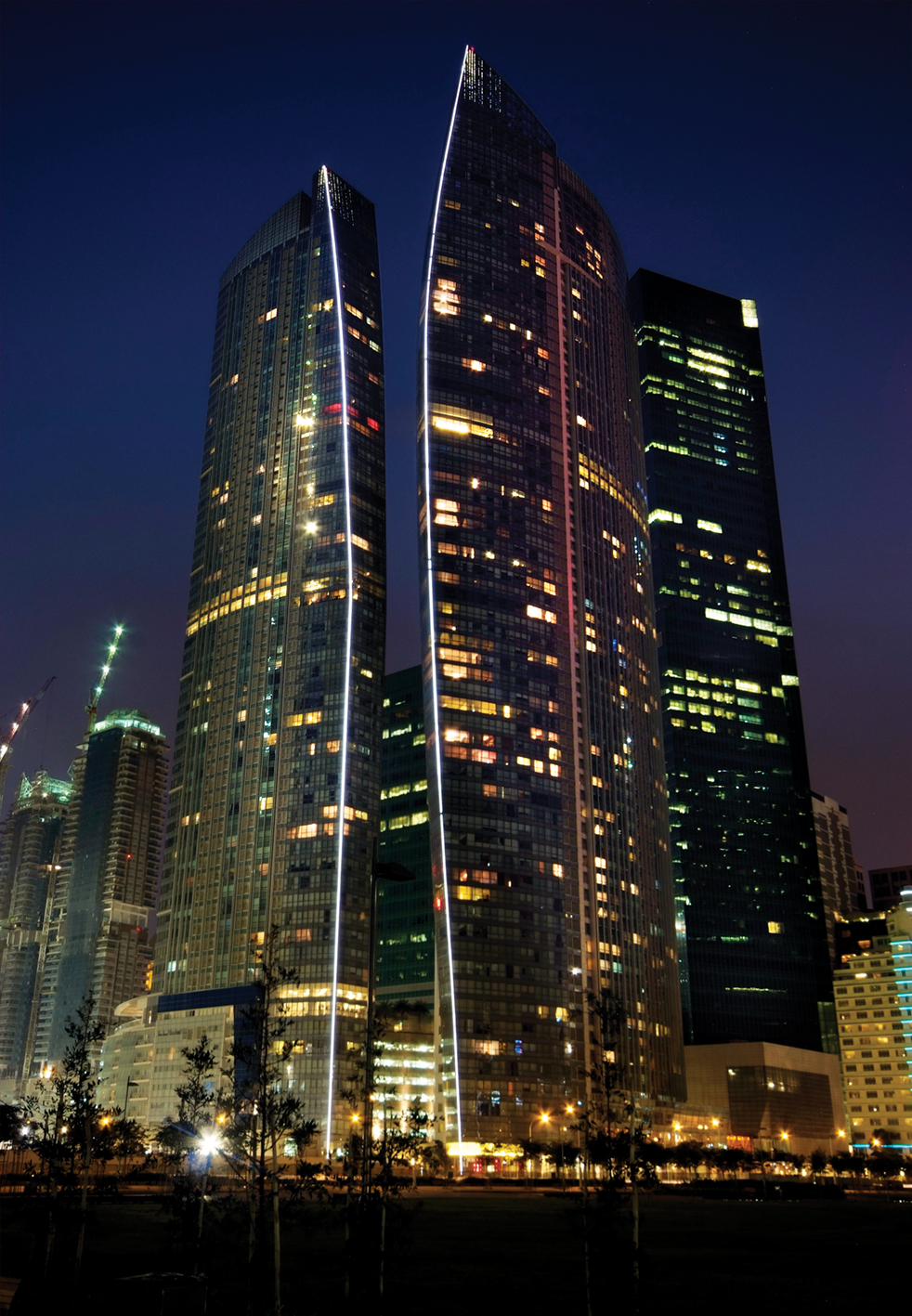
The Sail @ Marina Bay at night

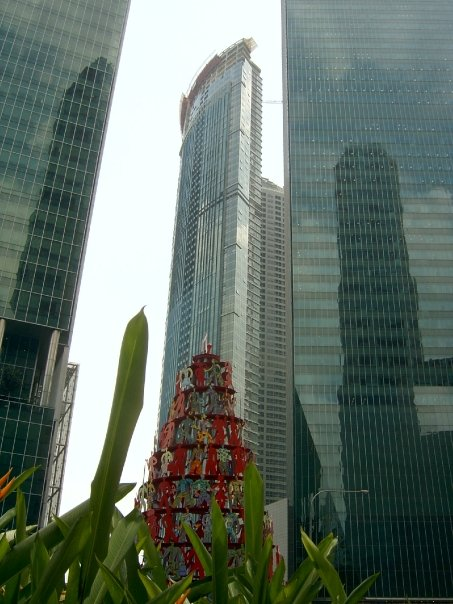
Taken on January 15, 2008 from Raffles Place

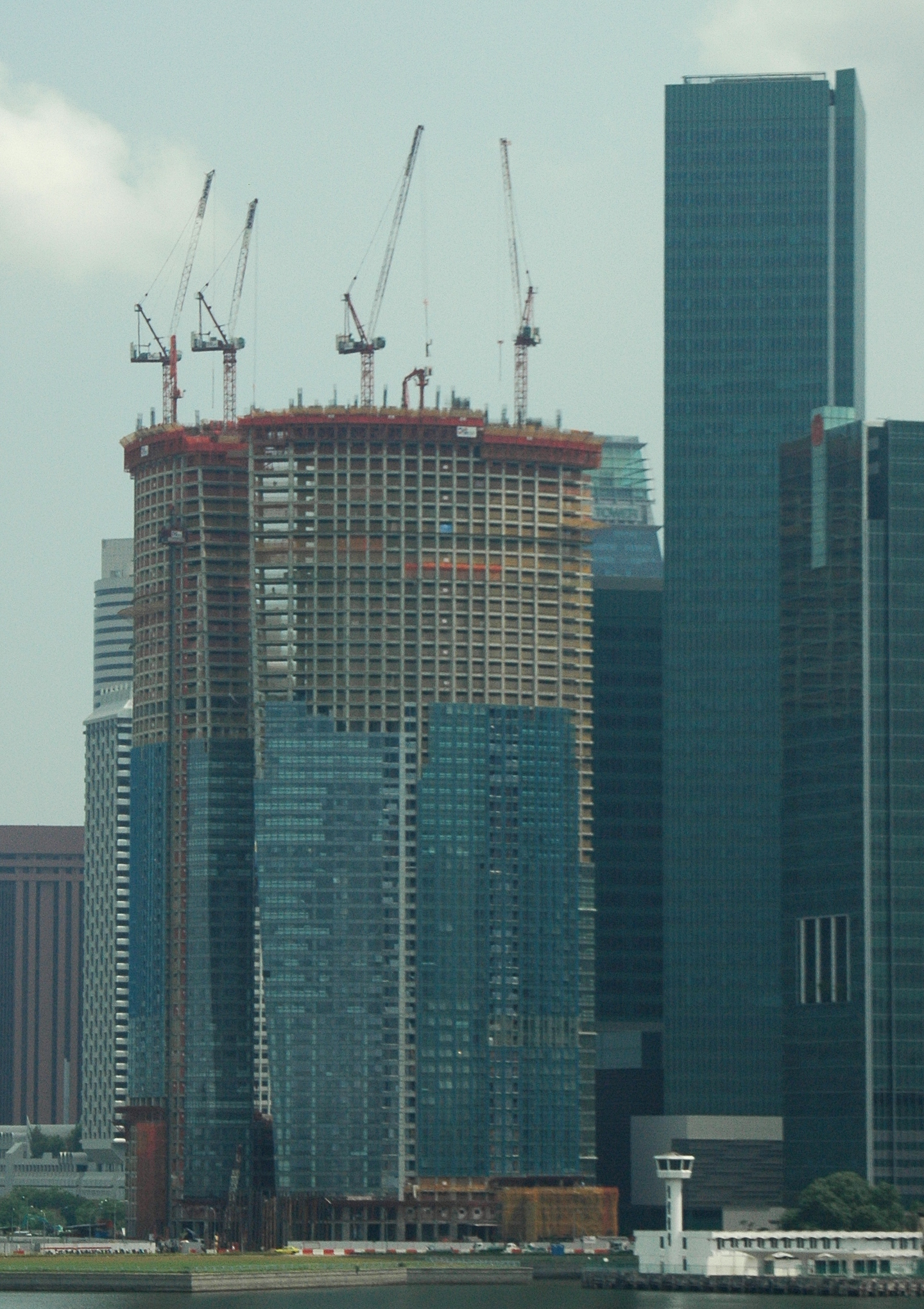
Construction progress on The Sail@Marina Bay, as of 29 June 2007.

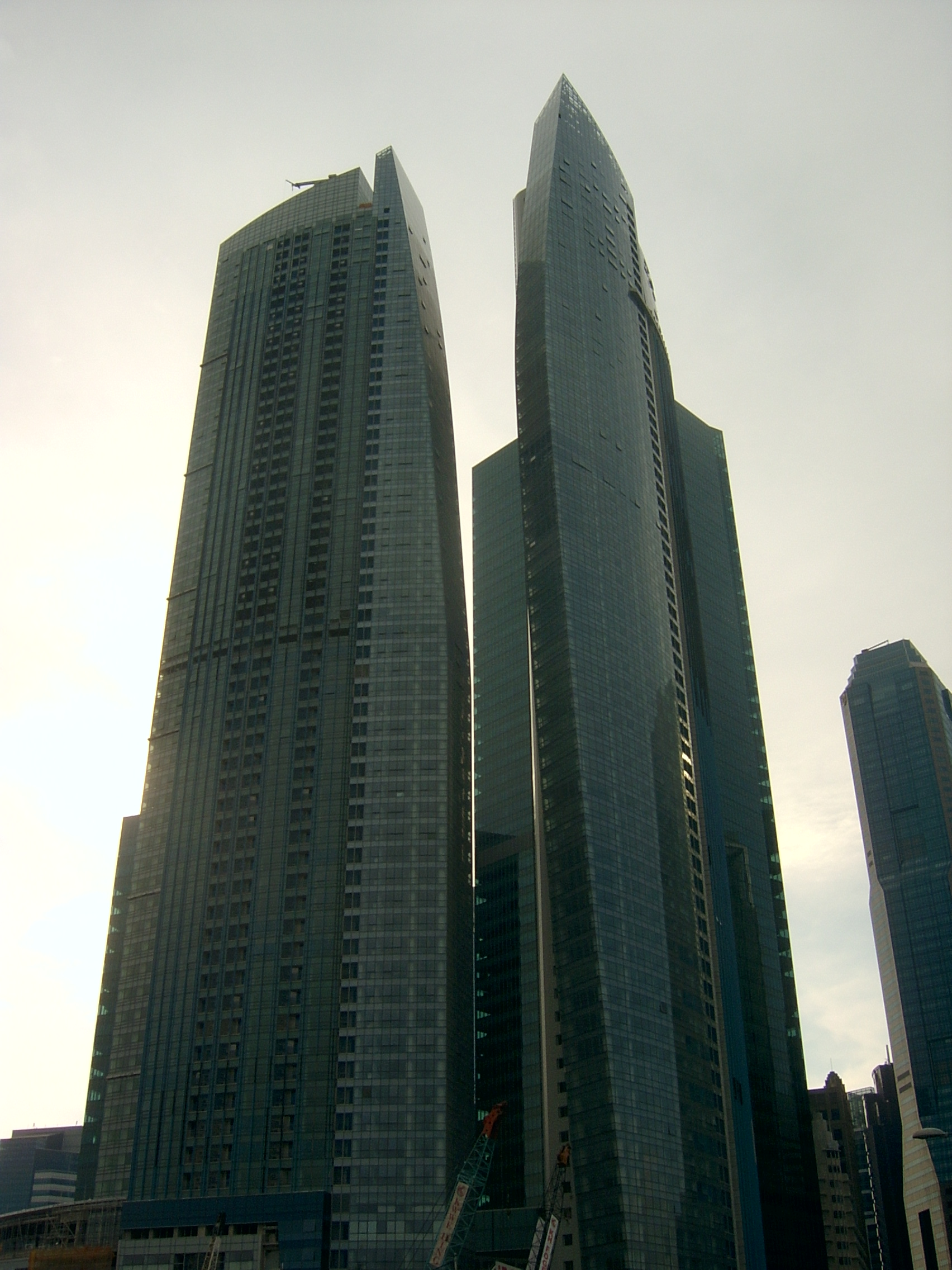
This is also from the Downtown MRT station on March 23, 2008.

== See also ==
- Tall buildings in Singapore
- List of tallest buildings in the world
