= Sport in colonial Singapore =

Sports in Singapore can be traced back to the colonial times where the earliest official records on sports were found. Sports had an important role to play as it helped to fill the idle hours for the colonials who had to wait for months for news of home from mail ships. It also offered an alternative to other activities such as the amateur local theatre scene and the "stiff dinner parties".

In colonial Singapore, the development of sports were shaped by diverse cultural backgrounds and a hierarchical social structure. Sports during those times was very much a luxury and was only for the privileged few. The average local had few, if any, opportunities to indulge in sporting activities. For most, simply trying to make a living took up most of their time. Moreover, the older sports clubs were established mainly for the colonials. Early sporting events were marked by limited participation and segregation along racial lines.

== Early history ==
One of the earliest large-scale sporting events was the New Year Sea and Land Sports, where participants could engage in various recreational activities. This event, held at the Padang, began in 1839, likely evolving from the New Year Sea Sports established in 1834, which was labelled as “New Years’ Day Regatta” was organised by merchants with races for Malay sampans, Tamil tongkangs and Europeans. The celebrations for New Year Sea and Land Sports in 1839 included a variety of races and games, such as horse racing, wrestling, biscuit-eating contests, running, diving for coins in molasses, walking on greasy poles, tug-of-war, sack races, three-legged races, and even goose hunts or pig races. However, there was also a sense that these festivities, though entertaining, involved a degree of exploitation, as the indigenous and migrant populations were often manipulated for the amusement of young civil servants and mercantile assistants rather than for their own enjoyment. New Year Sea sports became a regular occurrence until the arrival of the Japanese in 1942. Over time, the character of these events shifted. Initially organized by the mercantile community to entertain the local population, by the 1870s, separate programs were introduced for Europeans and locals. The introduction of monetary prizes and betting opportunities contributed to the growing popularity of the sports, drawing large crowds.

In 1842, the establishment of the Singapore Sporting Club marked a significant milestone in the colony's sporting history. The Singapore Sporting Club became the first institution dedicated to promoting sporting ideals in colonial Singapore. Founded to promote horse racing and improve horse breeding, the club played a crucial role in the development of organized sports in colonial Singapore. By offering prizes, the club encouraged participation and elevated horse racing to a favoured pastime among the affluent European settlers.

As the colony evolved, more organized sports began to emerge, reflecting the growing colonial presence and societal changes. The greater ease of travel from Europe to Singapore in the aftermath of the 1869 opening of the Suez Canal led to some of the most formative decades in modern Singaporean sport. After the arrival of Raffles, it took ten years for the first sporting club to be established in Singapore. The first organization devoted exclusively to games was the Billiard Club.

With the influx of Asian immigrants, various communal clubs began to sprout to serve their respective communities, such as the Chinese Swimming Club, the Indian Association, the Ceylon Sports Club and others. These, together with the colonial clubs played a key role in the development of sports in those days.

Associations for specific sports were also formed such as the Singapore Rifle Association, Football Association of Singapore, Singapore Rugby Union and others. Many more such sports clubs, established during this period, eventually became National Sports Associations.

With the growing interest in sports, the British Colonials built a number of public sports facilities during the 1930s to 50s e.g. Mt. Emily Swimming Complex, Farrer Park Sports Complex, Yan Kit Swimming Complex and others. Some of these facilities have since undergone major changes.

== Japanese occupation and aftermath ==
During the Japanese occupation, sport was prioritised by the government. By 1945, the British resumed control of Singapore.

Before the 1948 Summer Olympics organised by Britain, Britain sent out invitations to its colonies and dependencies to participate in the Games. However, due to a lack of an Olympic Council, Singapore, despite being a Crown Colony, was omitted. This led to the formation of Singapore Olympic and Sports Council on 27 May 1947. It was planned that the Council will merge with a similar Olympic Council of Malaya.
