= Thais in Singapore =

Thailand citizens living in Singapore

Thais in Singapore คนไทยในสิงคโปร์
- (Thailand) (Singapore)
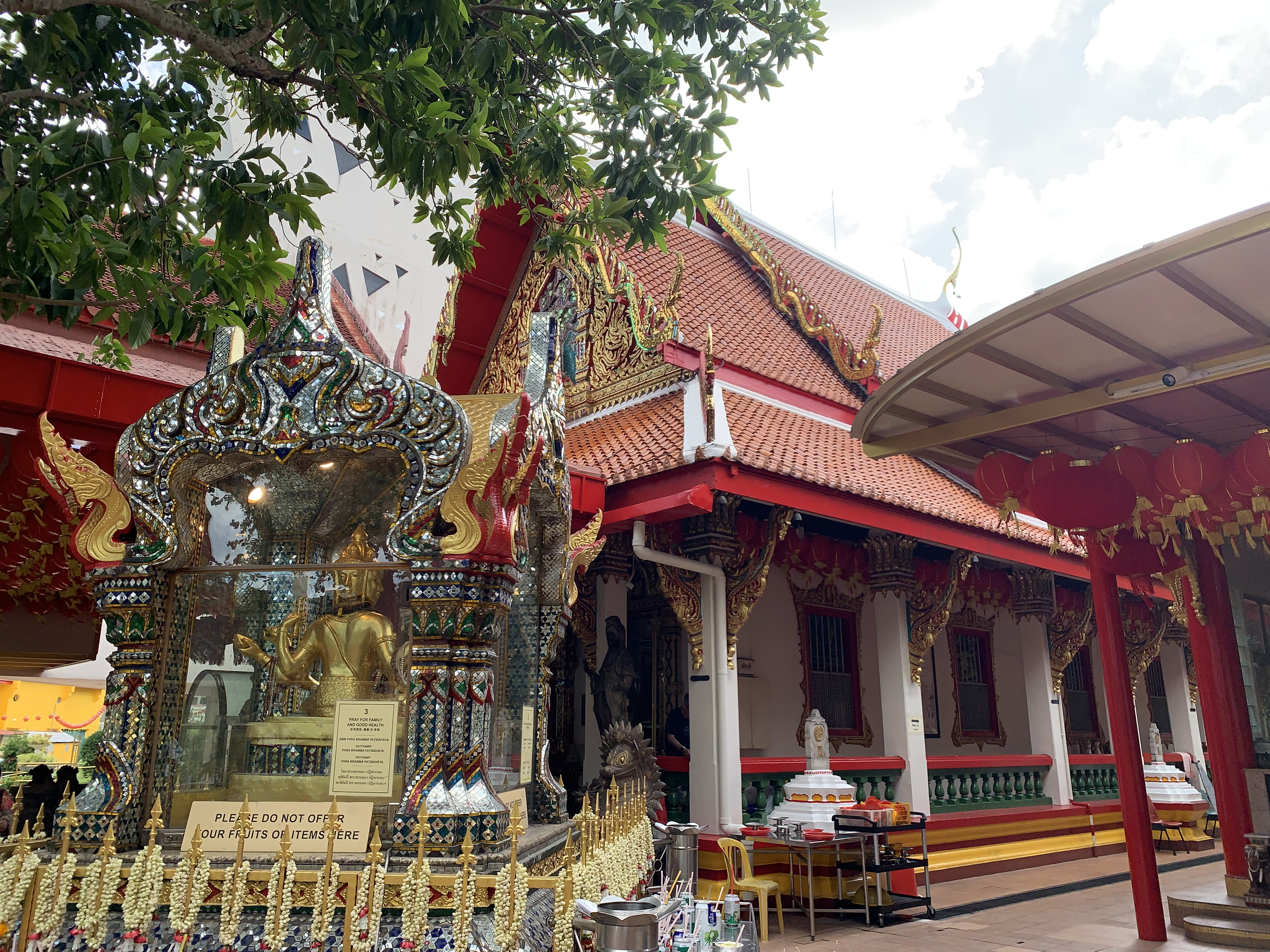
- Wat Ananda Metyarama Thai Buddhist Temple, the oldest Thai temple in Singapore

Total population
- 47,700 (2012)

Languages
- Thai language, Mandarin Chinese, English

Religion
- Theravada Buddhism

Related ethnic groups
- Thai diaspora

Thais in Singapore refers to people who are holding Thai citizenship or people of Thai descent who were born or residing in Singapore. With a population of 47,700 in 2012, according to Thailand's Thai Consular, they are the 8th largest overseas Thai community and 2nd largest in Southeast Asia.

== History ==
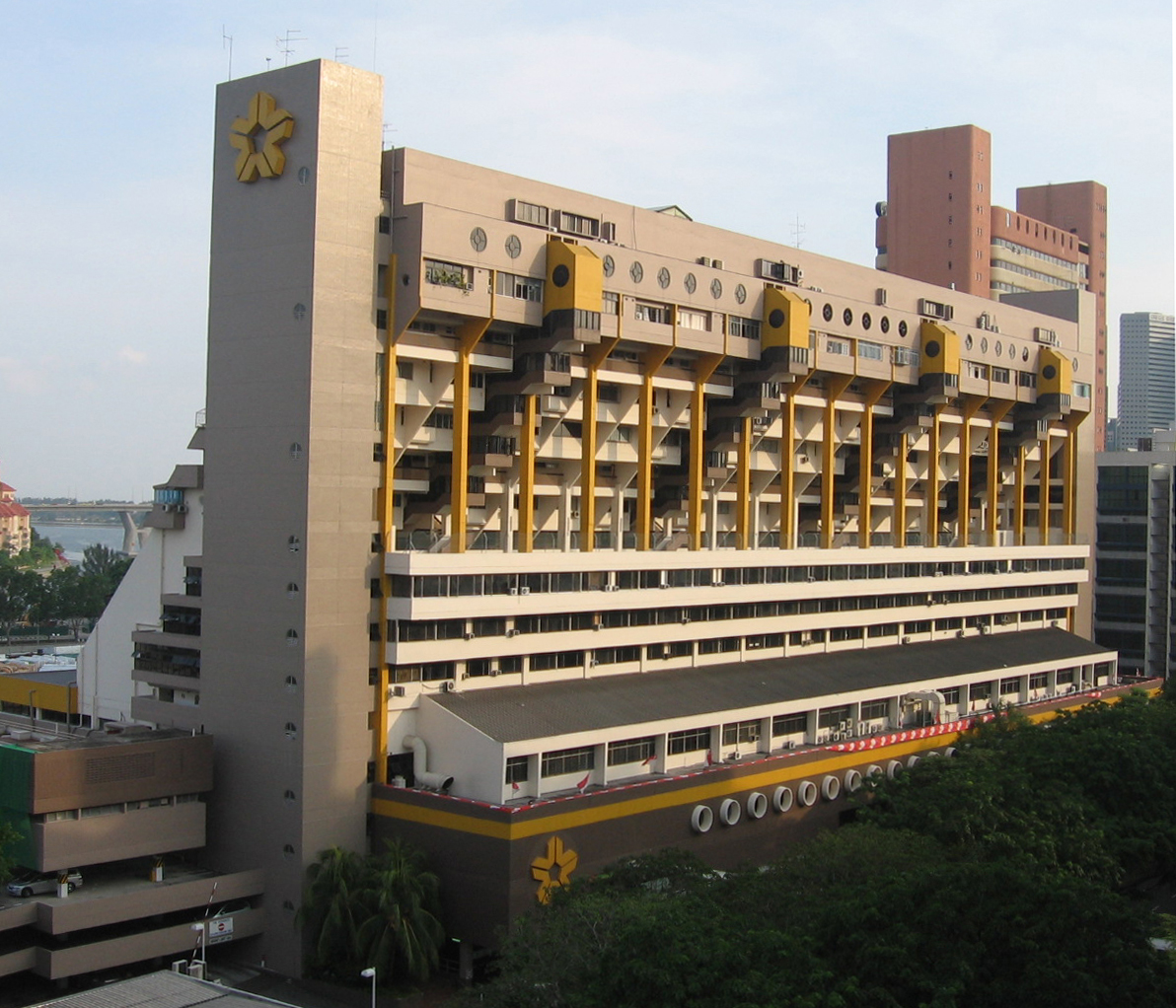
Golden Mile Complex was home to many Thai restaurants and is also known as Singapore's Little Thailand.

During Singapore's construction boom in the 1980s and early 1990s, Thai migrant workers made up the bulk of foreign construction workers in the country. They arrived by bus into Singapore by the thousands from Thailand to work on infrastructure projects around the country. Golden Mile Complex was a common pick up and drop off point for these buses resulting in the emergence of more Thai businesses such as restaurants, tour agencies, Thai newspaper stands around the area and the place was colloquially known by locals as 'Little Thailand'.

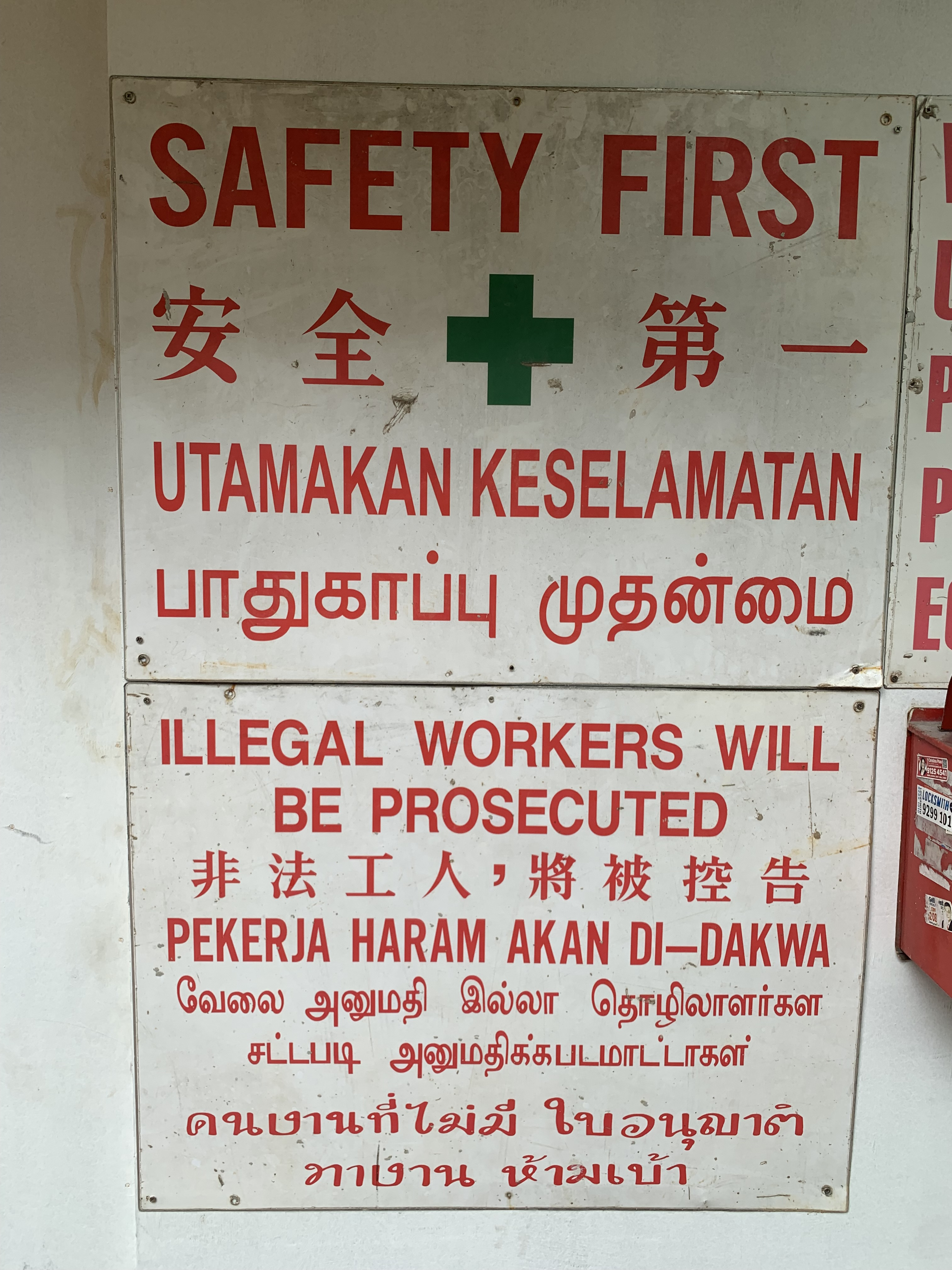
A sign at a construction site in Chinatown with five languages; Thai and the four national languages

Today, there are lesser Thai construction workers in Singapore as the construction workforce relies more on workers from China and South Asia.

== Notable Thai temples in Singapore ==
- Wat Ananda Metyarama Thai Buddhist Temple, oldest Theravadin Buddhist Temple in Singapore
- Palelai Buddhist Temple
- Uttamayanmuni Buddhist Temple, of Kelantanese Thai origin
- Kancanarama Buddhist Temple, joint with a Taoist temple under the same temple complex

== Notable people ==
- Ben Davis, a Thai footballer playing for Uthai Thani FC.
- Pornsak Prajakwit, a Thai Chinese actor based in Singapore.
- Vanessa-Mae, a British violinist with a Thai father and Singaporean mother.
- Vernetta Lopez, a Singaporean actress and DJ.

== See also ==
- Thai people
- Thai diaspora
- Thais in Hong Kong
- Malaysian Siamese
- Singapore–Thailand relations
