= Burmese people in Singapore =

Burmese in Singapore
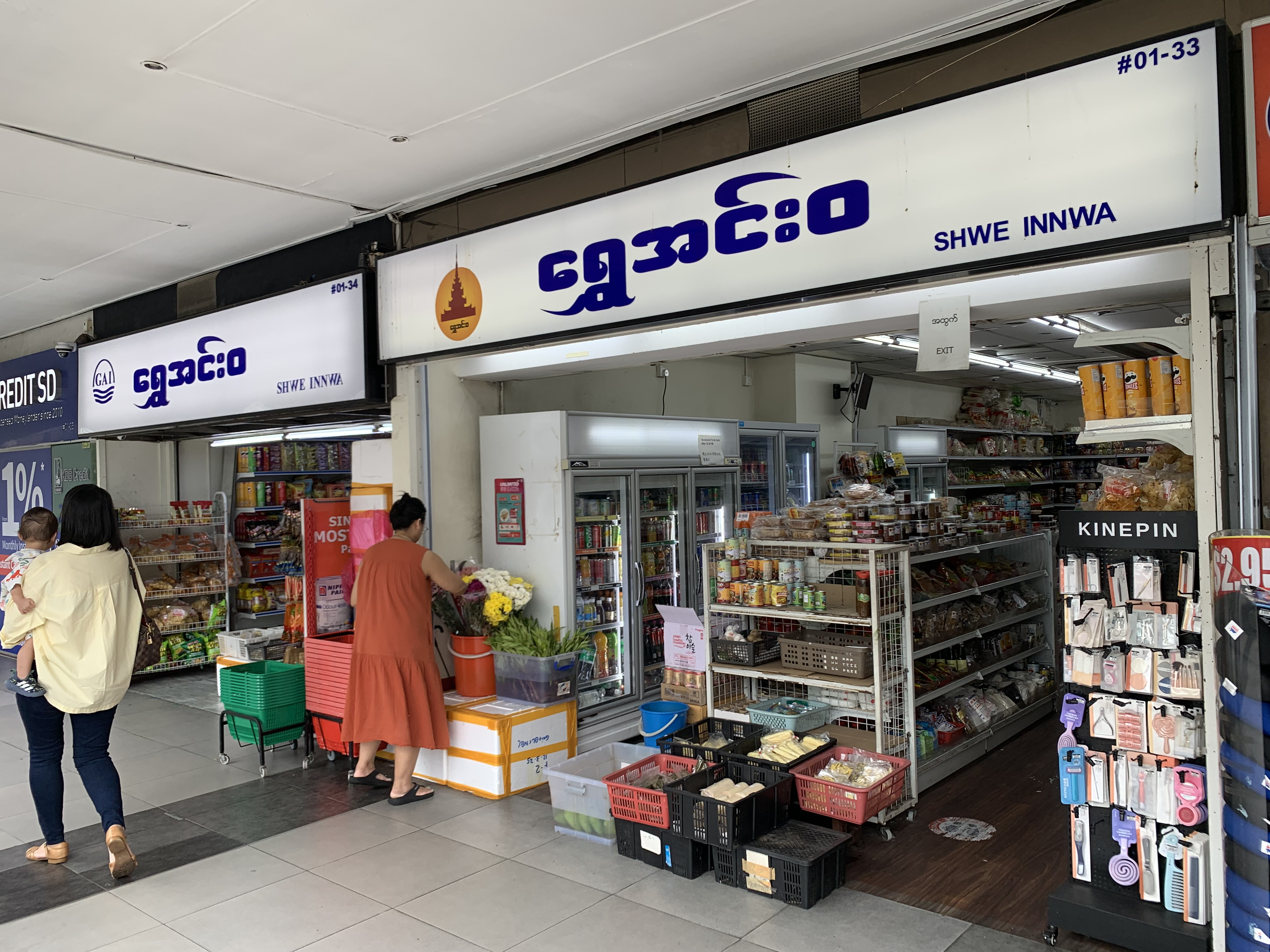
- Burmese stores in the Peninsula Plaza

Total population
- c. 200,000

Languages
- Burmese, English; some study Mandarin as a second language

Religion
- Buddhism; Catholicism; Protestantism

Related ethnic groups
- Burmese diaspora

Burmese in Singapore consist mainly of Myanmar expatriates. The Myanmar community in Singapore is estimated to number 200,000, made up of students, healthcare workers and foreign domestic workers, as well as skilled professionals.

The Burmese Buddhist Temple in Singapore is Singapore's oldest Theravada institution, founded in 1875 by a Burmese emigrant. The 10-tonne Buddha image within the temple was transported from Mandalay in 1921. Today, it remains the only Burmese Buddhist temple built in the traditional Burmese style and serves as a landmark for many Burmese immigrants in Singapore.

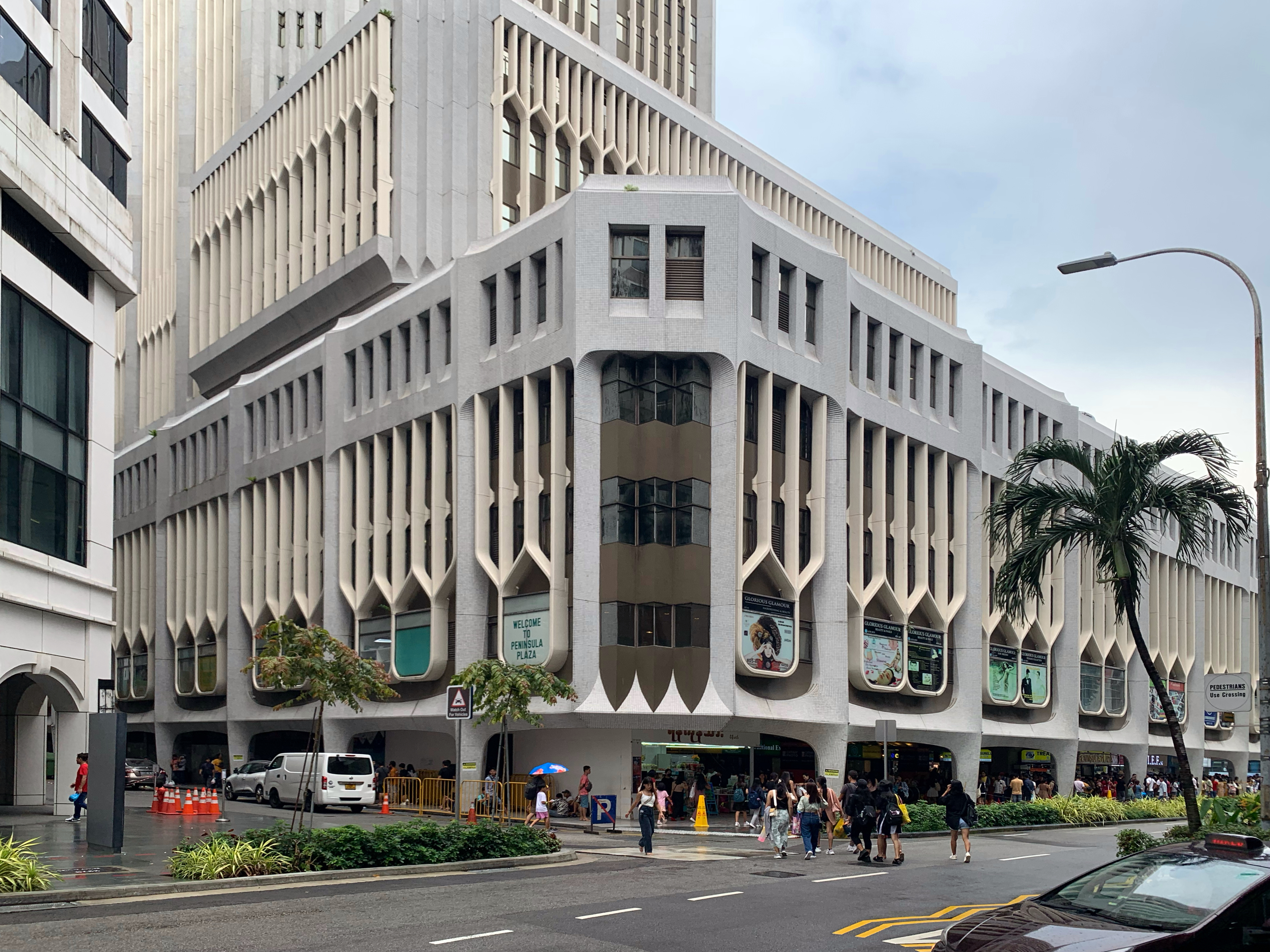
Peninsula Plaza, Singapore

Peninsula Plaza, located close to Singapore's former City Hall is home to a Burmese enclave with traditional wear, Burmese restaurants and stores located inside the plaza's mall. The area was once home to Tan Kim Ching and the Peninsula Plaza was built in 1979 and was designed to preserve the sea view from Fort Canning. It eventually became a hub for the local Myanmar community in the 1990s, with early businesses and a Burmese-language library opening in the Plaza.

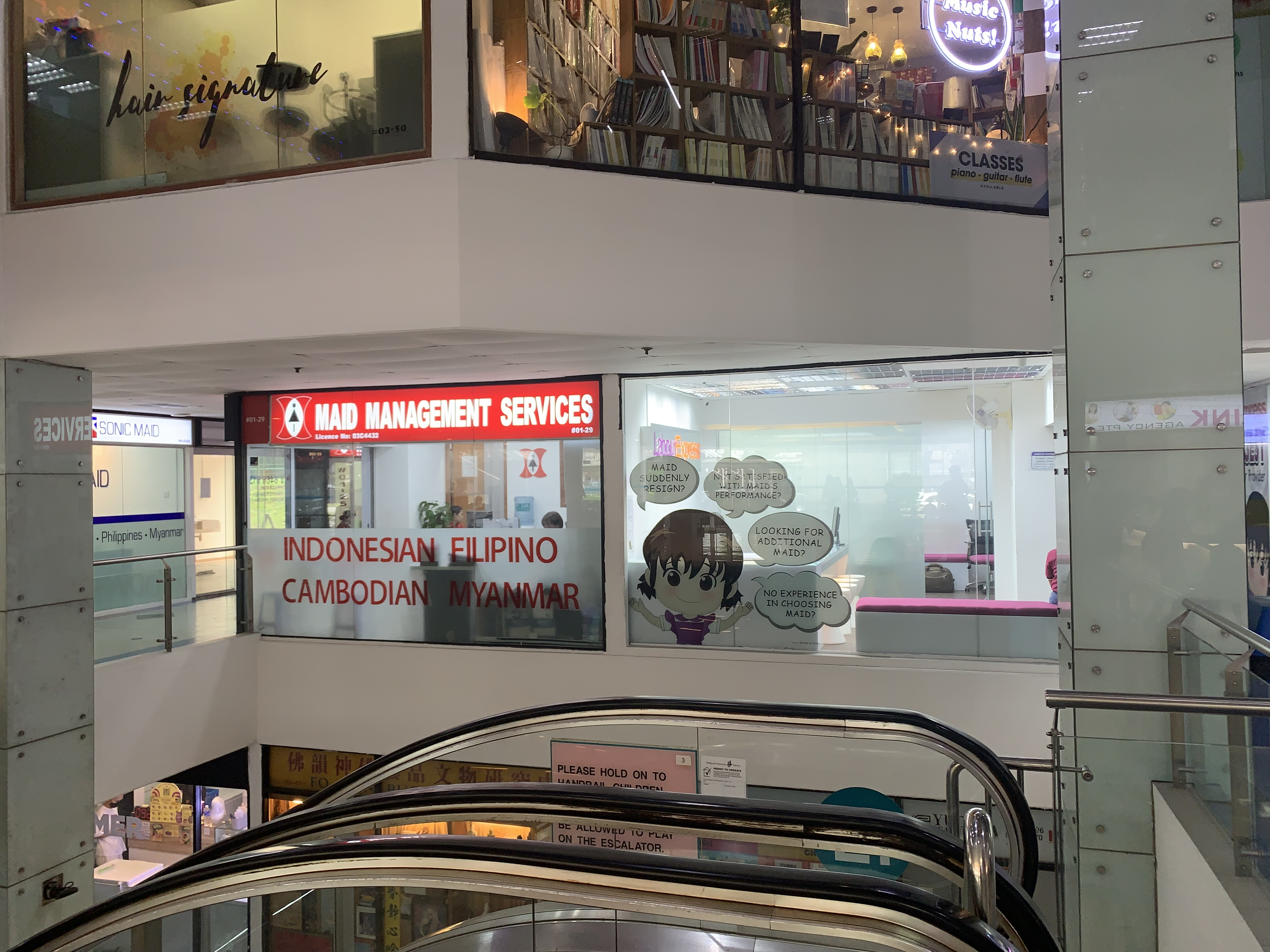
Maid agencies in Bukit Timah with Burmese workers advertised

Myanmar nationals in Singapore often work as maids, who are cheaper than their counterparts, mainly because they typically lack full knowledge of the English language. These Burmese maids form their own communities, including four Chin language Christian Churches within Singapore.
