= Thai diaspora =

Thai

Overseas Thai or Thai diaspora (Thai: คนไทยพลัดถิ่น, คนไทยในต่างแดน) number approximately 1.1 million persons worldwide. They can be roughly divided into two groups:

A "non-resident Thai" is a citizen of Thailand who holds a Thai passport and has temporarily emigrated to another country for employment, residence, education or any other purpose. The Bank of Thailand estimates that, as of 2016, 1,120,837 Thais worked overseas.

- Israel: As of 2018, a total of 24,746 Thais, mostly agricultural workers, temporarily resided in Israel. They reportedly earn a minimum of about 47,000 baht a month.

- South Korea: As of September 2018, there were reportedly 192,163 Thais living in South Korea. The Korean Justice Ministry estimates that the number of illegal Thai residents soared from 68,449 in 2017 to 122,192 as of August 2018.

A "person of Thai origin" is a person of Thai origin or ancestry who was or whose ancestors were born in Thailand or other countries under Thai ancestry and holds non-Thai citizenship. A person of Thai origin might have been a citizen of Thailand and subsequently taken the citizenship of another country.

== Overseas Thai communities ==
- Luk khrueng
- Thai Americans
- Thai Australians
- Thai Canadians
- Thais in India
- Thais in Japan
- Malaysian Siamese
- Thai New Zealanders
- Thais in Hong Kong
- Thais in Singapore
- Thais in the United Kingdom
- Siamese Cambodians
- Tanintharyi Thai
- Yodaya people
