= Wat Ananda Metyarama Thai Buddhist Temple =

Theravada Buddhist monastery and temple in Singapore

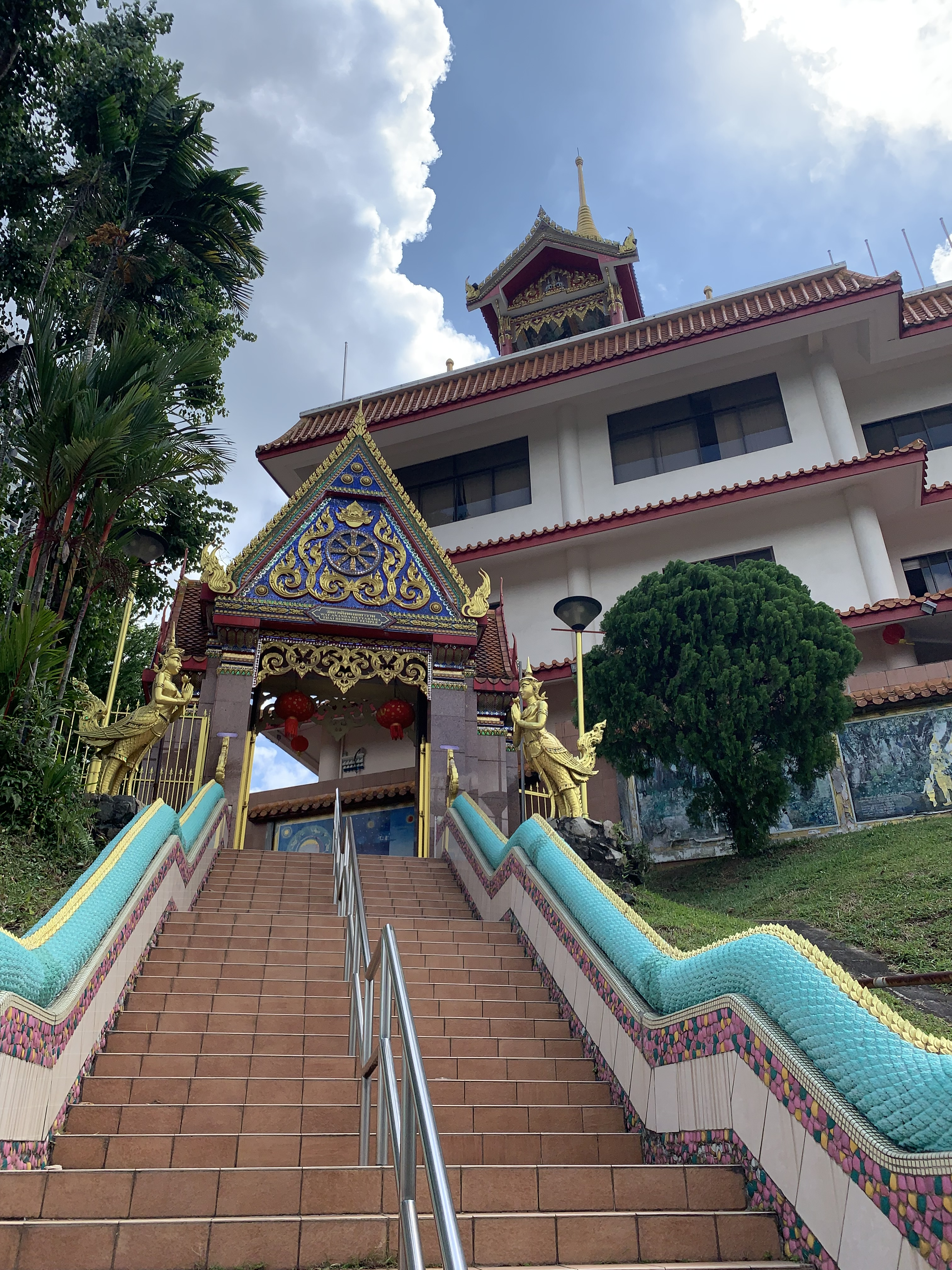
- Staircases flanked by two Phaya Naks at the entry to Wat Ananda Metyarama Thai Buddhist Temple from Jl Bukit Merah
- Interactive map of Wat Ananda Metyarama Thai Buddhist Temple

Monastery information
- Full name: Wat Ananda Metyarama Thai Buddhist Temple
- Order: Theravada
- Established: 1920s

People
- Founder: Venerable Luang Phor Hong Dhammaratano
- Abbot: Venerable Chao Khun Phra Tepsiddhivides
- Important associated figures: Venerable Phra Rajayankavee, Venerable Phra Maha Amnad Ithiyano, Venerable Phraku Bisaldhammanides, Venerable Chao Khun Phra Tepsiddhivides

Site
- Location: 50B Jalan Bukit Merah, Singapore
- Coordinates: 1°16′43″N 103°49′45″E
- Website: www.watananda.org

Wat Ananda Metyarama Thai Buddhist Temple (Thai: วัดอานันทเมตยาราม; RTGS: wat anantha mettayaram) is a Theravada Buddhist monastery and temple in Singapore. The monastery was originally set up by Venerable Luang Phor Hong Dhammaratano with his disciple Samanera Boonler. The temple is located at 50B Jalan Bukit Merah.

== Overview ==
Founded in the 1920s, Wat Ananda Metyarama Thai Buddhist Temple is the oldest Thai Theravada Buddhist temple in Singapore. Originally situated at 83 Silat Road, it was renovated in 1953 under the then-abbot Venerable Phra Rajayankavee, with further renovations as well as new construction between 1975 and 1997 under present-day abbot Venerable Chao Khun Phra Tepsiddhivides. In the 21st century, the monastery underwent a major construction exercise which concluded with a brand new building at 50B Jalan Bukit Merah in 2014.

On 5 January 2014, the new extension were officially opened by Indranee Rajah. The new building features a Dhamma hall, Meditation hall, Cultural center (museum), conference room, dining hall, rest area, Sunday classroom, and the monks' abode. The new Julamanee Prasat Theravada Columbarium was opened on 15 June 2014 at the temple.

== Wat Ananda Youth Group ==
Wat Ananda Youth (WAY) is an organisation founded in 1966 by Venerable Phraku Bisaldhammanides. It was formerly known as the Ananda Metyarama Buddhist Youth Circle. After Bisaldhammanides left for Bangkok in 1974, WAY continued holding most of its activities in the Temple.

== Dhamma Wisdom Centre ==
Regular events are conducted at the Dhamma Wisdom Centre at 27 Jalan Senyum.

== Gallery ==
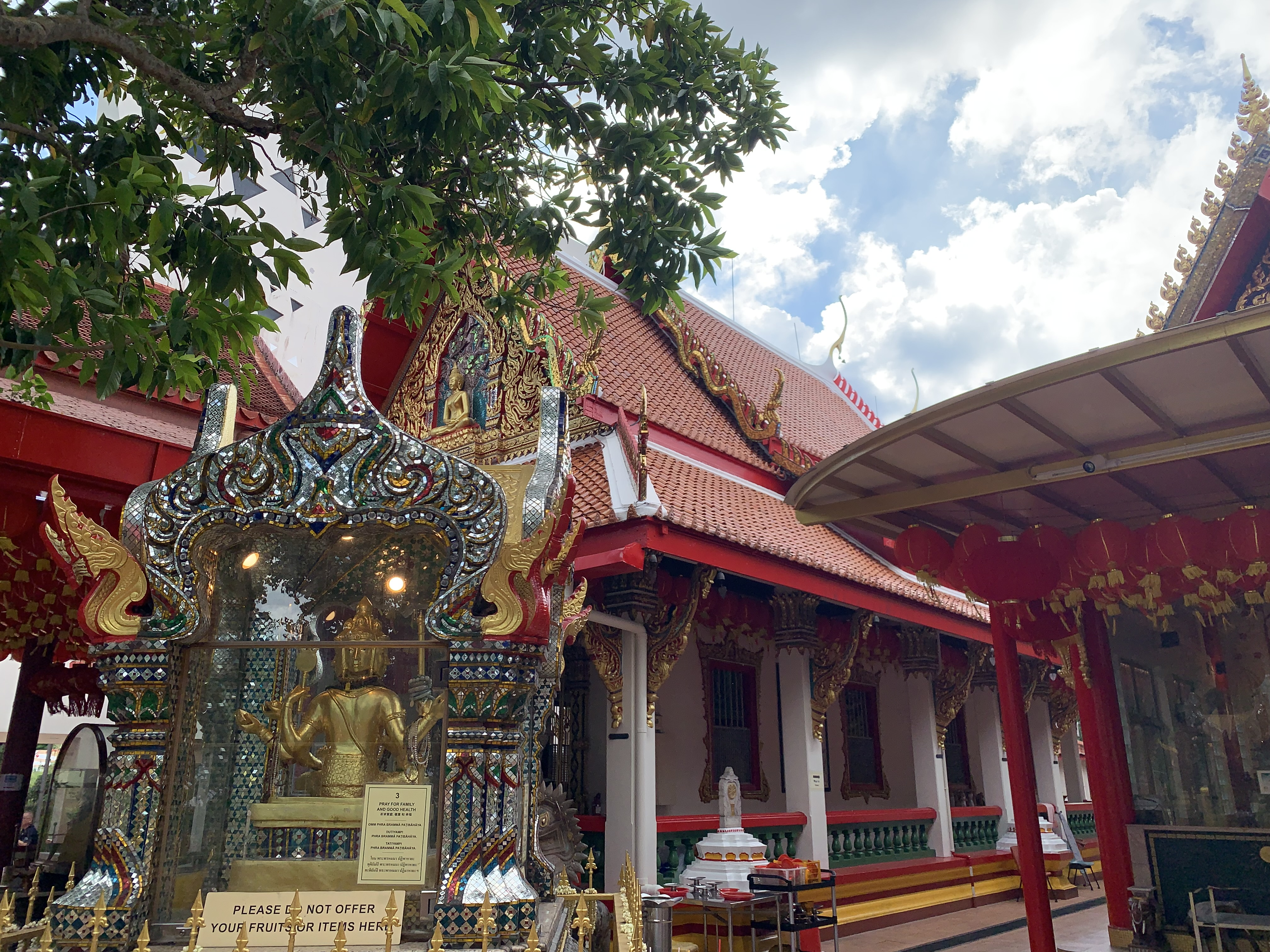
Ubosot building and the shrine to Phra Phrom

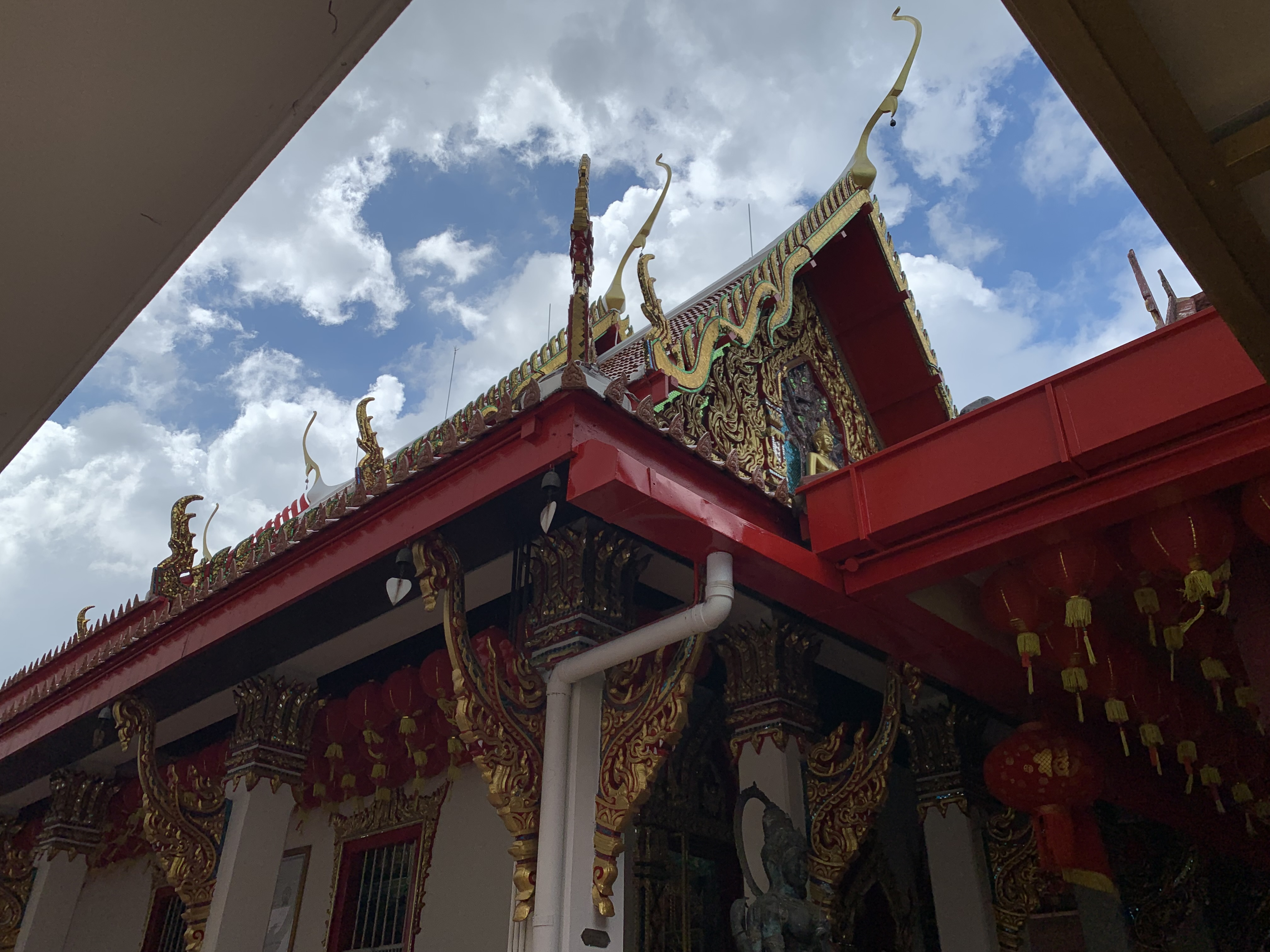
Roof details of the Ubosot

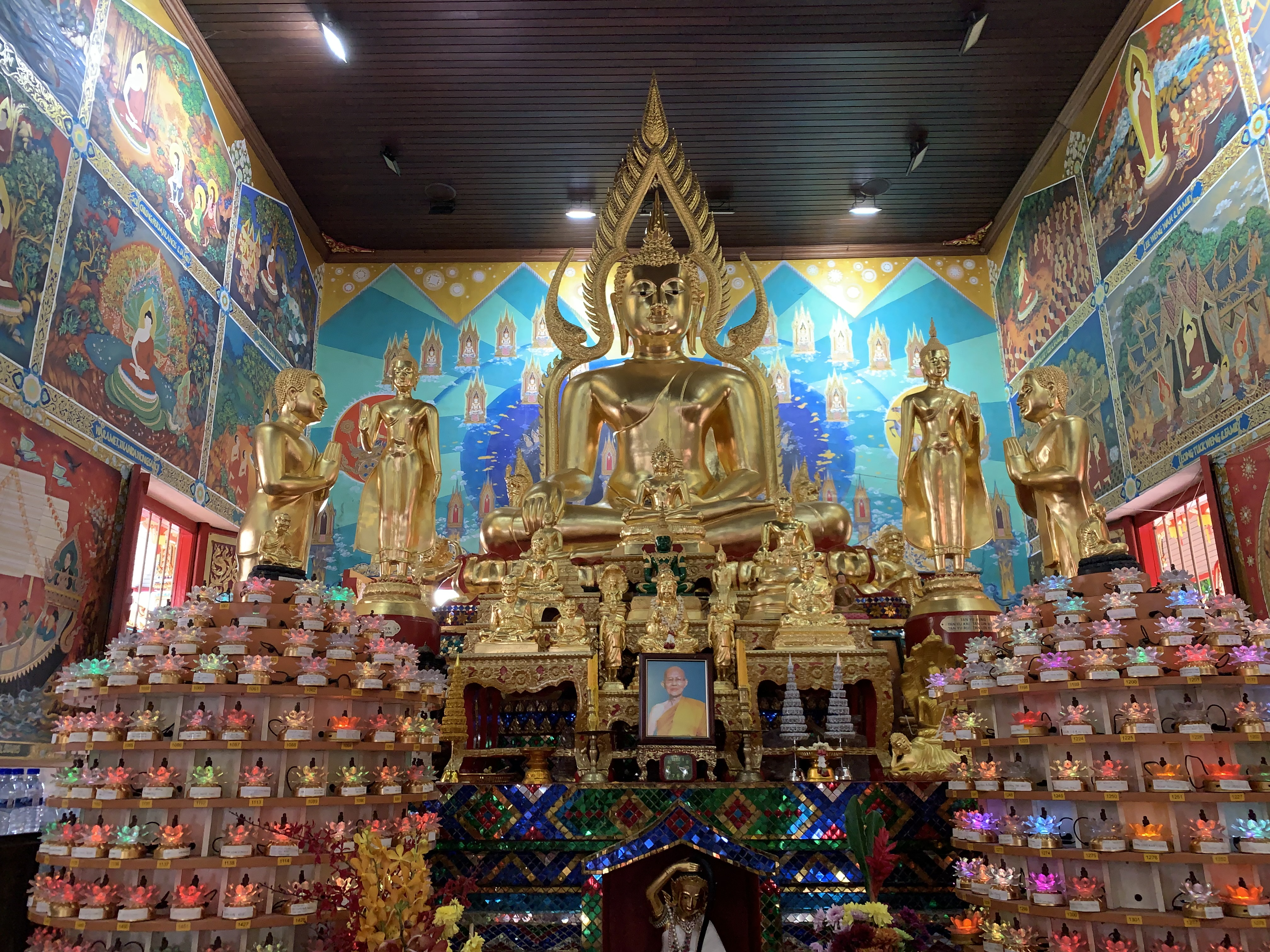
Interior of the Ubosot

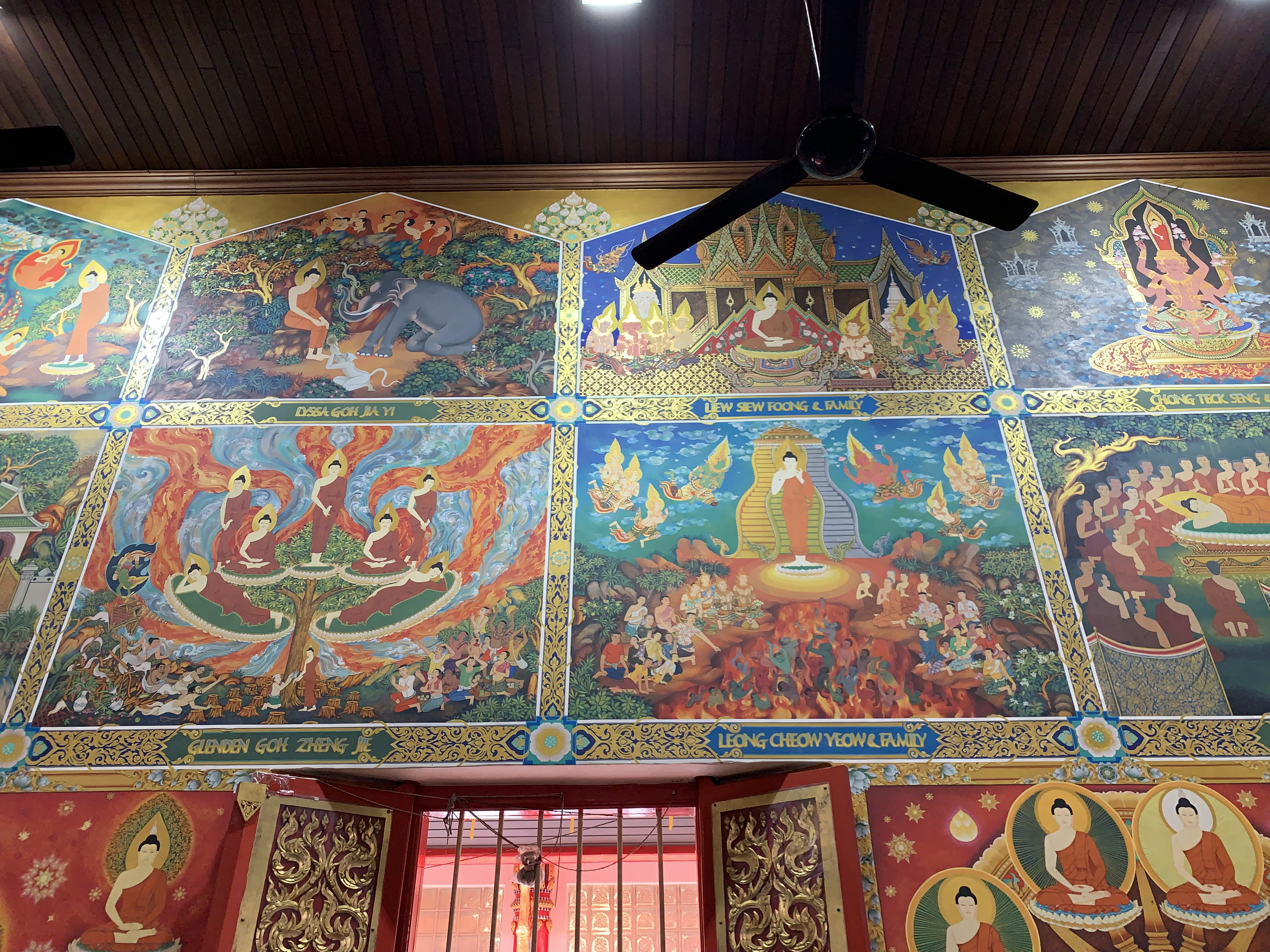
Murals in the Ubosot depicting the Buddha's life

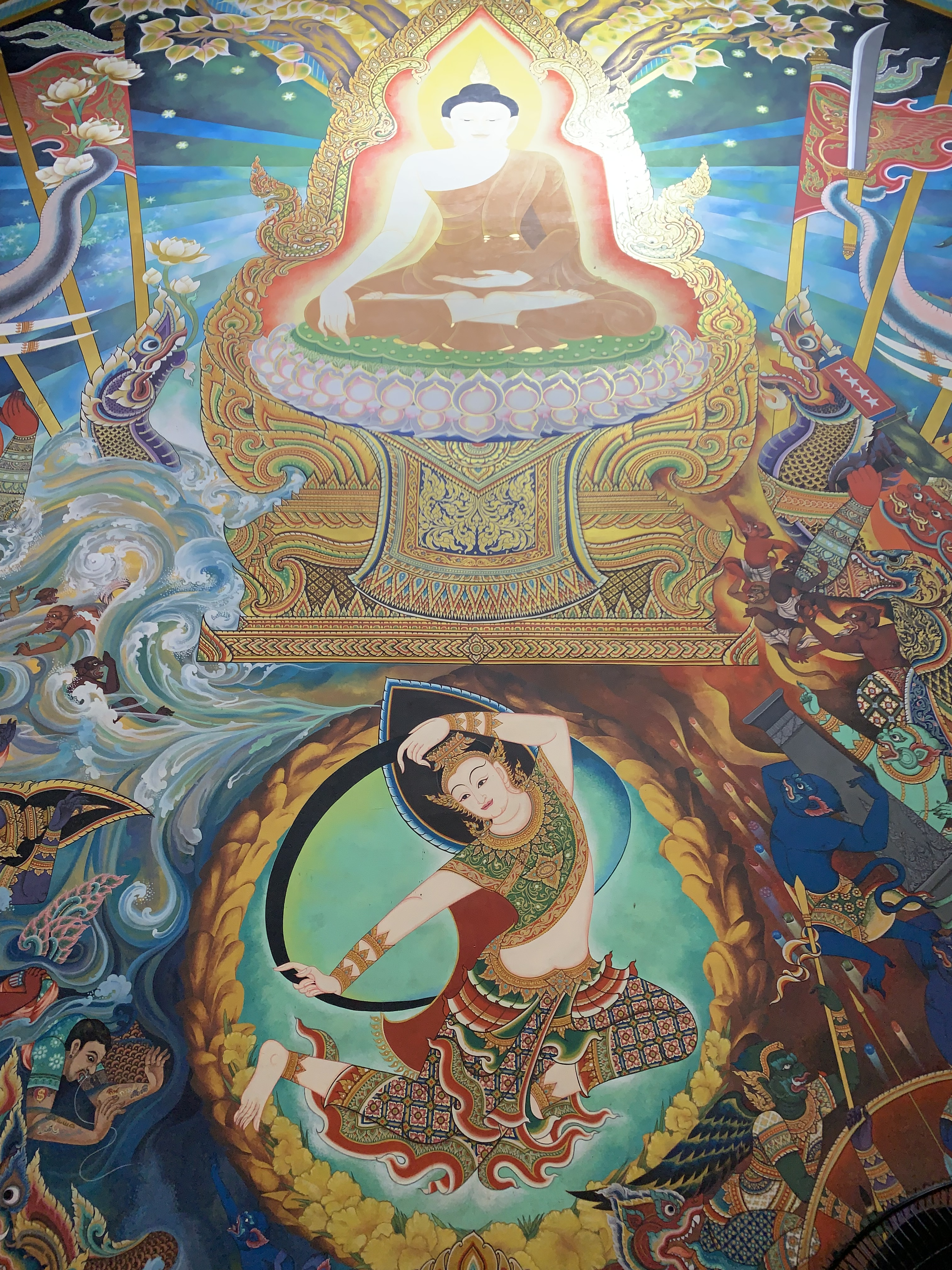
Murals in the Ubosot depicting the scene of the Buddha's victory over the Māras

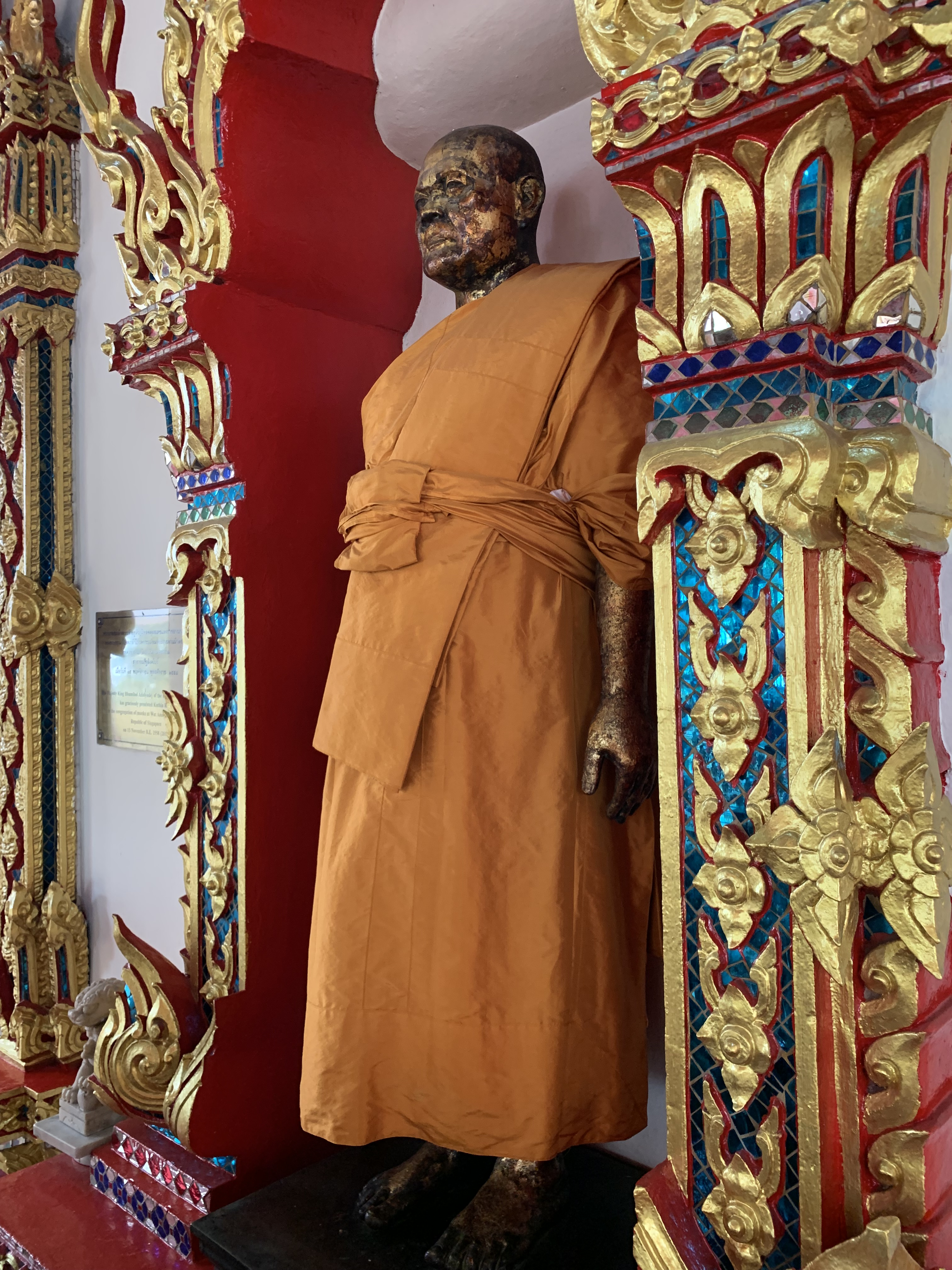
Statue of Luang Por Hong, the founder, at the front of Ubosot

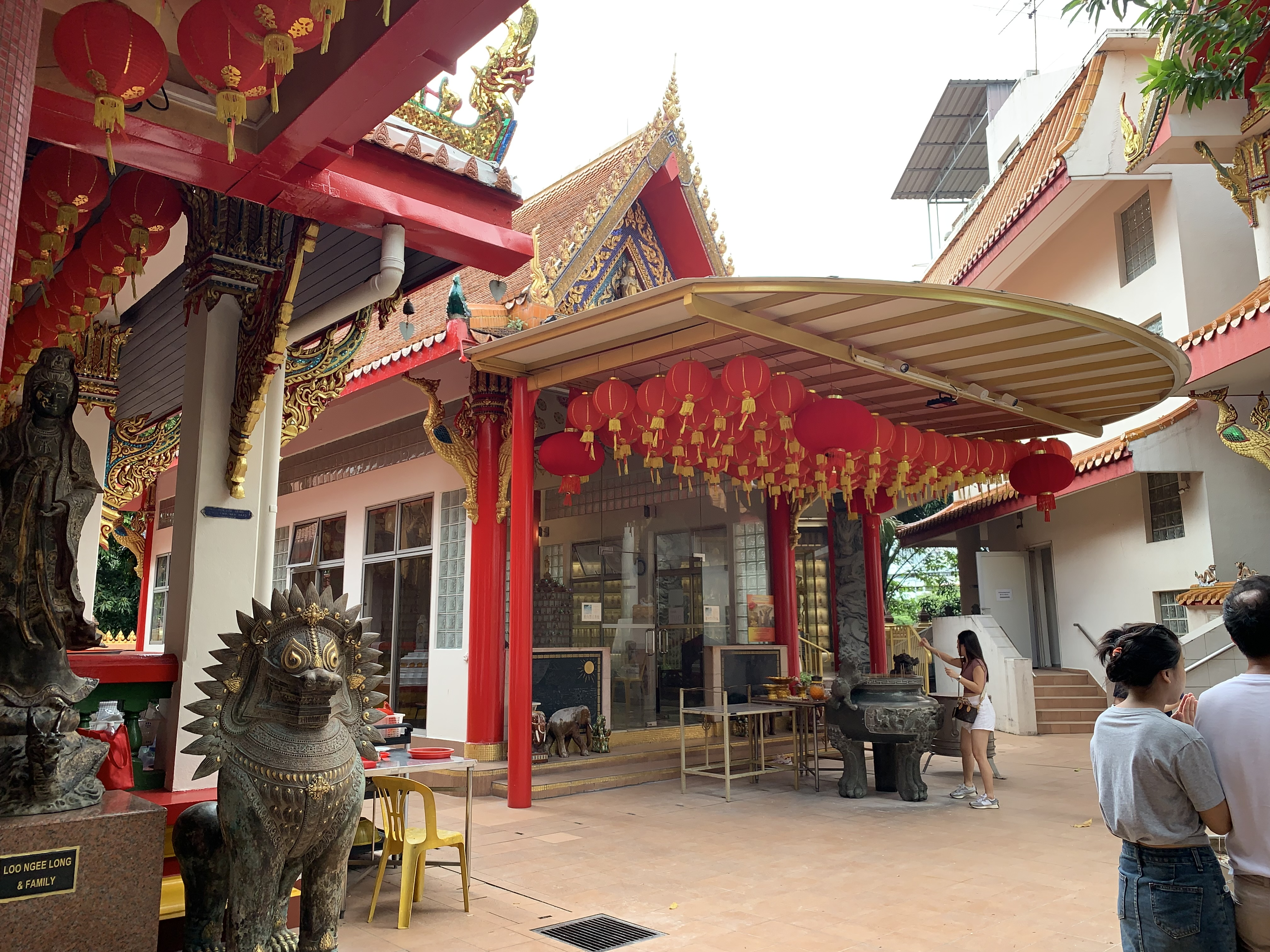
Shrine to Guan Yin

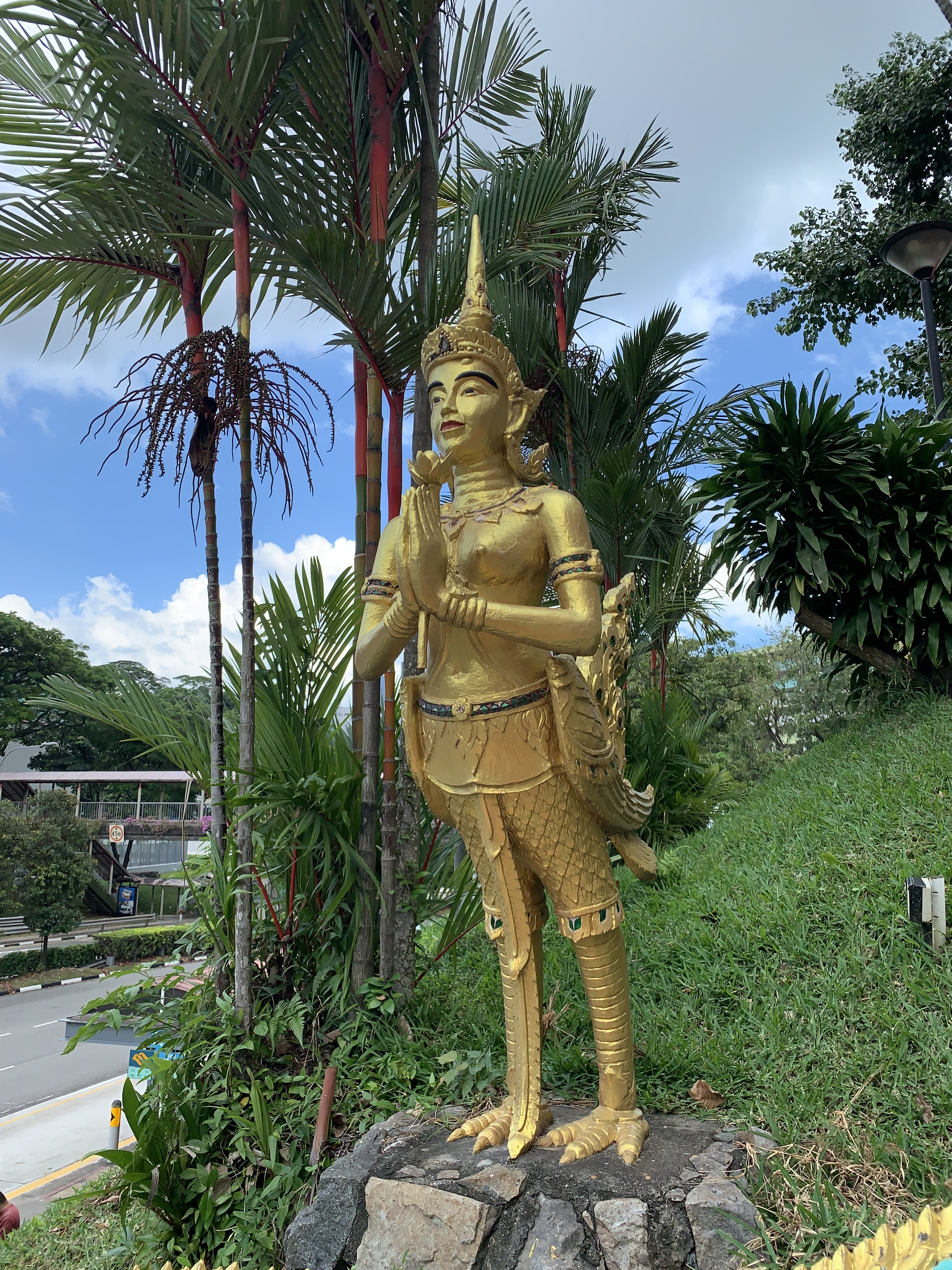
Kinnari statue at the entrance

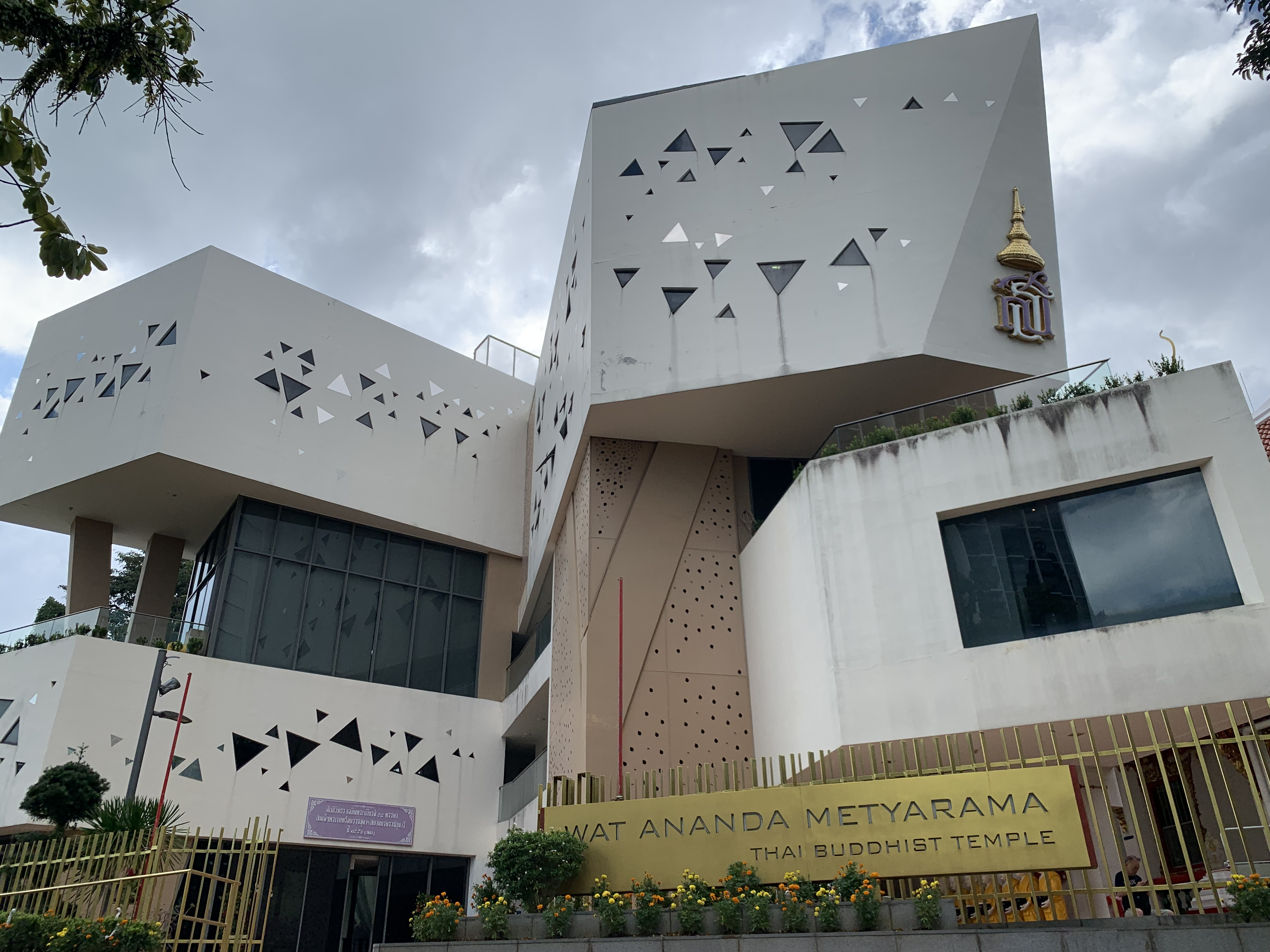
Sirindhorn Building

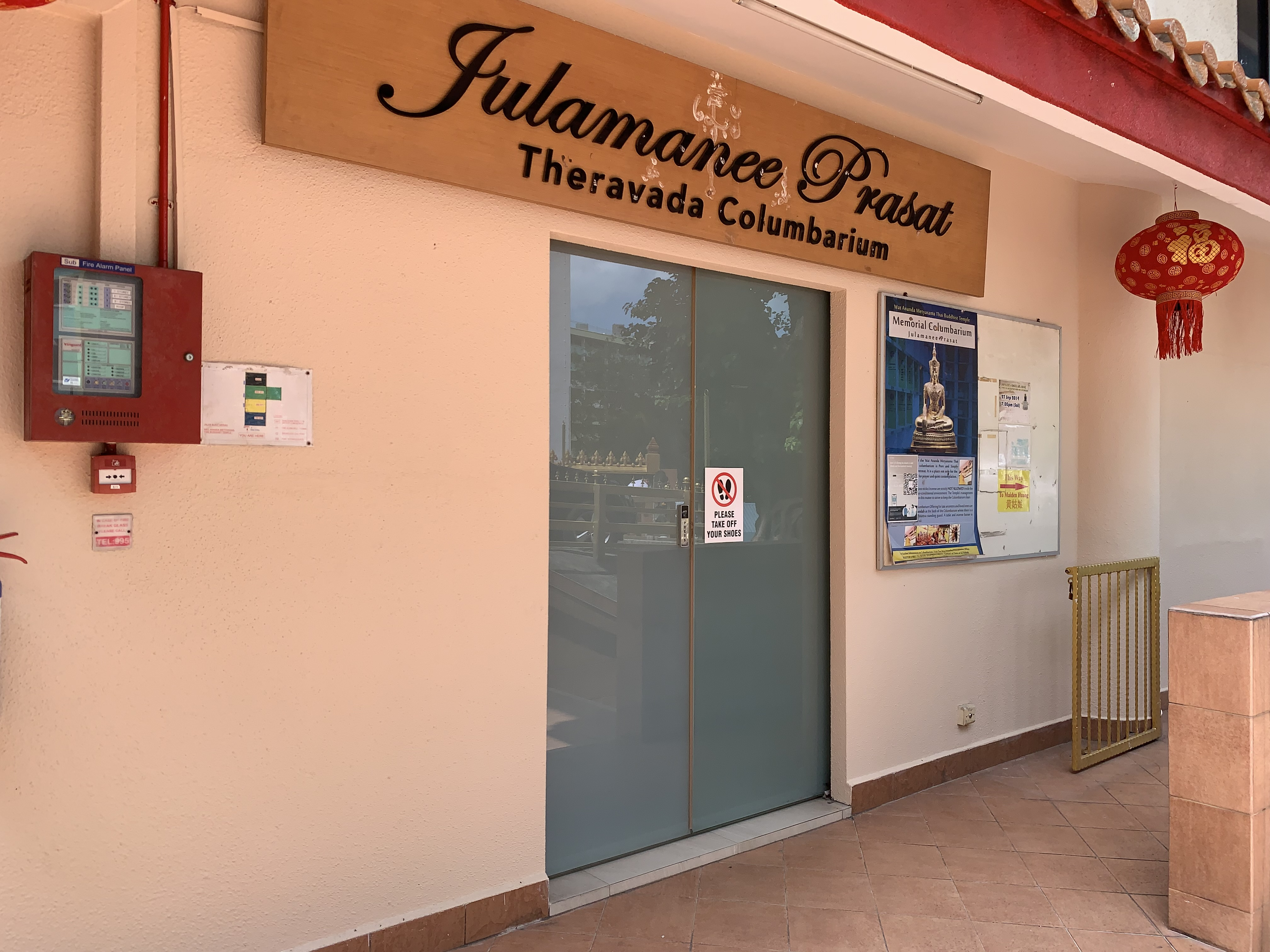
Julamanee Prasat, the Columbarium

== See also ==
- Wat Ananda Youth
- Palelai Buddhist Temple
- Burmese Buddhist Temple
- Sri Lankaramaya Buddhist Temple
- Ti-Sarana Buddhist Association
- Vipassana Meditation Centre
- Buddhism in Singapore
- Thais in Singapore

== News articles ==
- "Oldest Thai Buddhist temple in Singapore turns 100; PM Lee attends celebration". The Straits Times (online). 13 May 2018.
- "Singaporeans join Thais to pray at Bukit Merah temple". The Straits Times (online). 16 October 2016.
