= Jalan Bukit Merah, Singapore =

Jalan Bukit Merah

Name transcription(s)
  - Chinese: 红山路
  - Malay: Jalan Bukit Merah
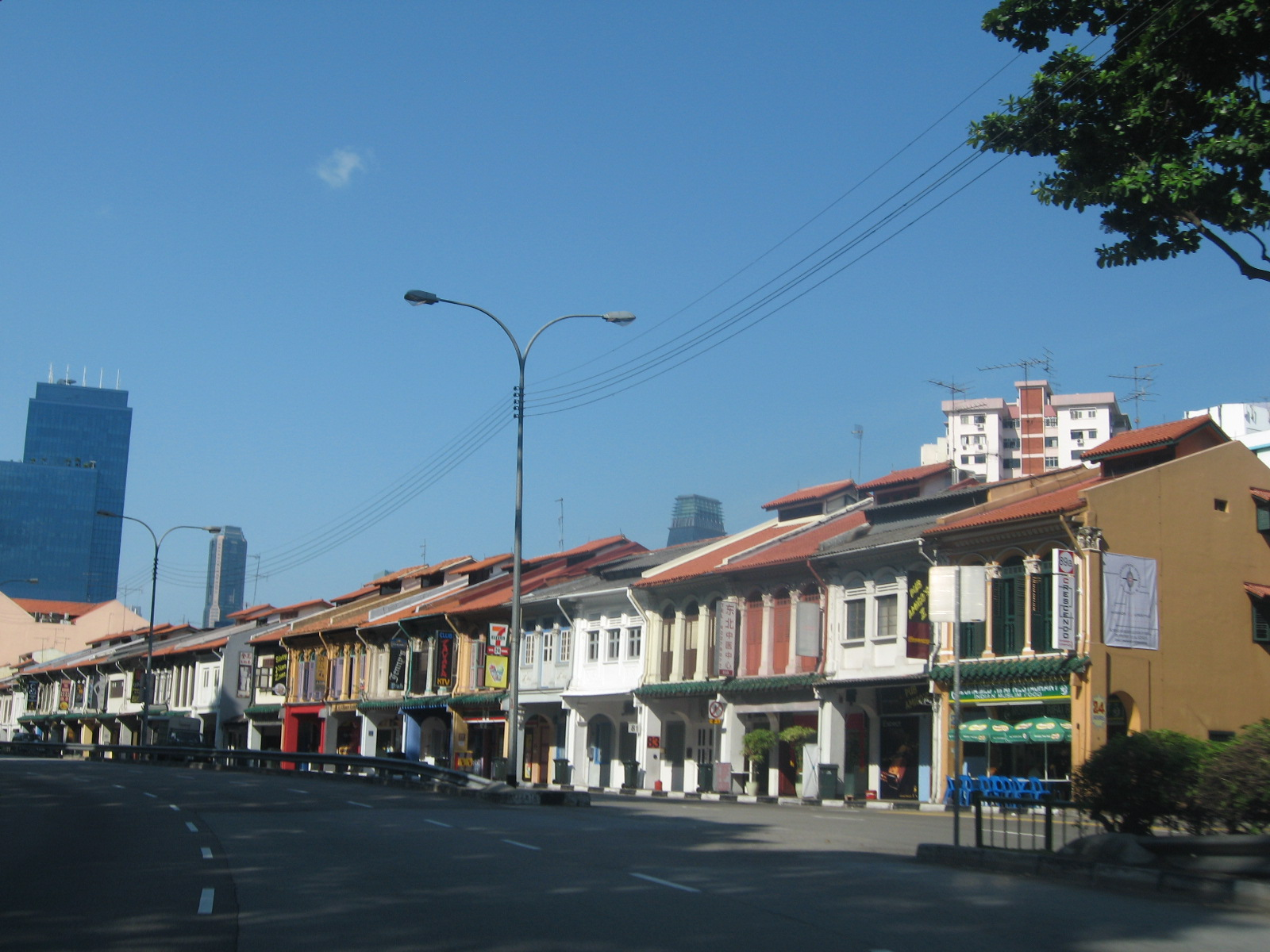
- Shophouses along Jalan Bukit Merah
- Interactive map of Jalan Bukit Merah
- Coordinates: 1.283°N 103.82°E
- Country: Singapore

Jalan Bukit Merah (Chinese: 红山路) is a major arterial road in Singapore. The road starts from the junction of Alexandra Road and Queensway in the west before ending at the junction of Kampong Bahru Road.

== Etymology and History ==
Jalan Bukit Merah was previously an unnamed dirt track before it was widened and paved over sometime in 1962. It was officially opened on December 15, 1963 by then Minister of Labor, Jek Yeun Thong. Being a state of Malaysia at that time, the road was named, "Jalan Bukit Merah", meaning "Red Hill Road" in Malay.

== Today ==
As a major arterial road cutting through Bukit Merah New Town, it can get very congested, especially during peak hours. Jalan Bukit Merah is lined up with a mixture of residential, industrial and other amenities like Wat Ananda Metyarama Thai Buddhist Temple, Kai San Tenple, and Silat Road Sikh Temple.

== Gallery ==
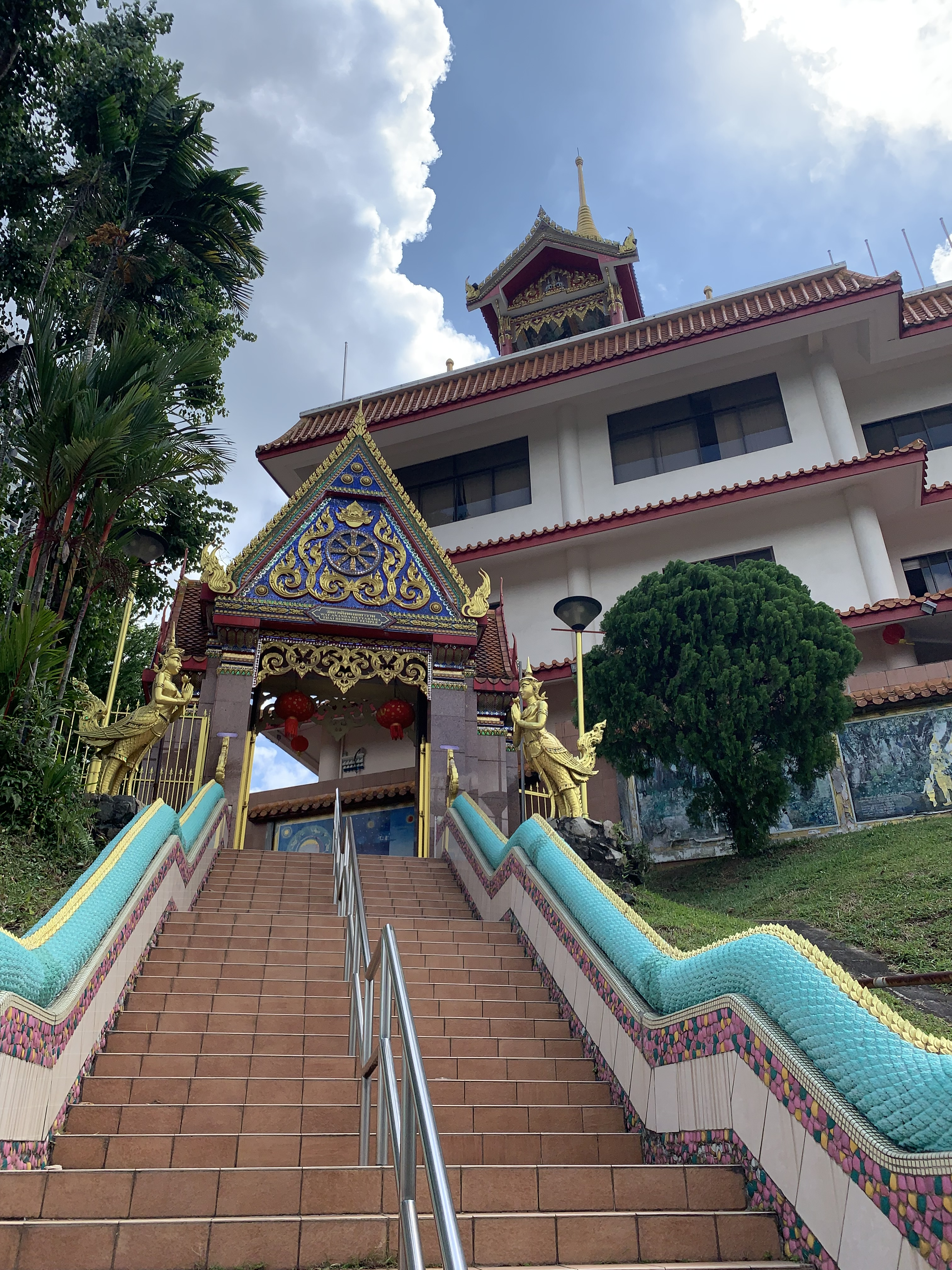
Wat Ananda Metyarama Thai Buddhist Temple

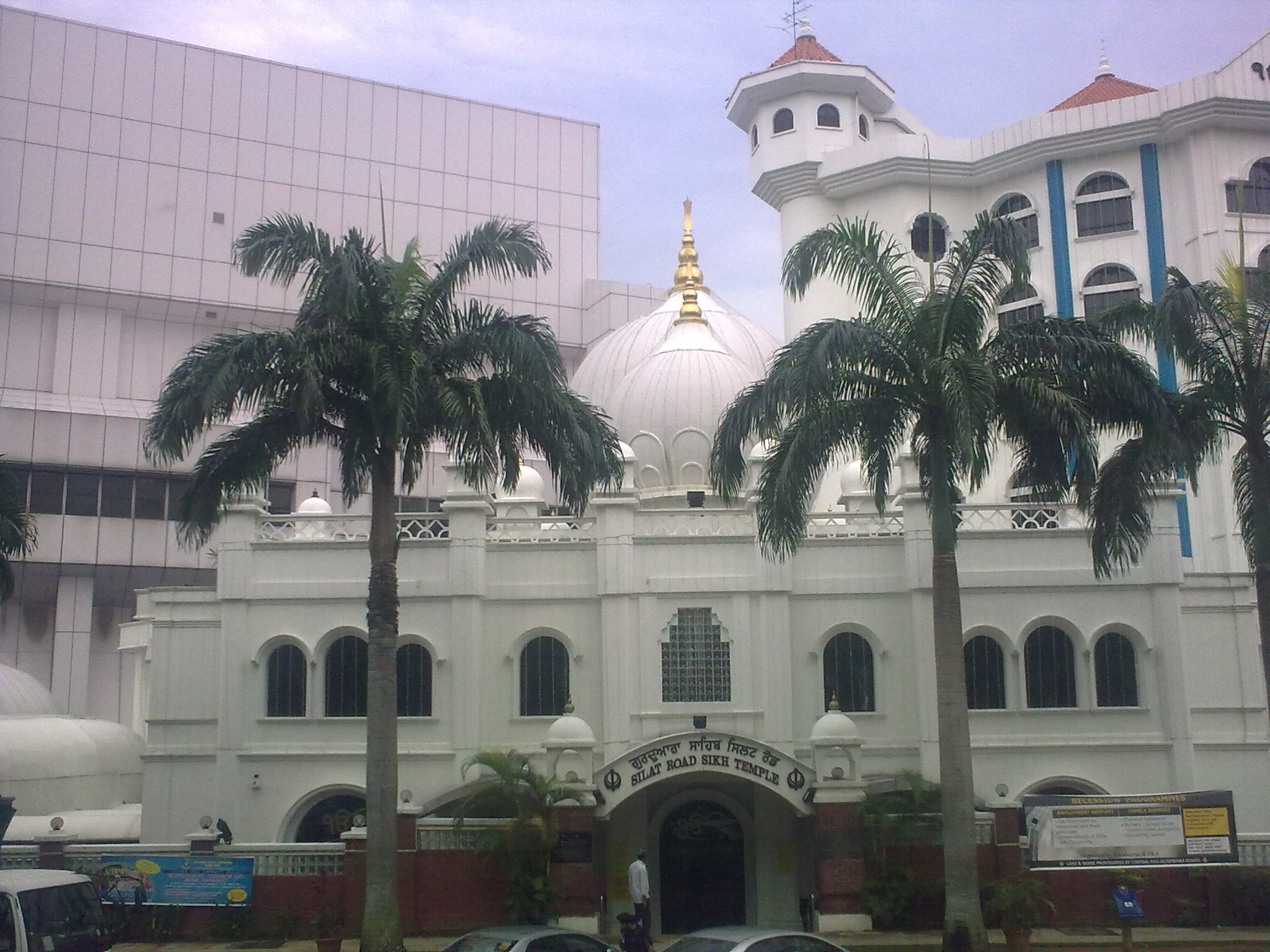
Silat Road Gurdwara
