= Vipassana Meditation Centre =

Buddhist centre in Singapore

Coordinates: 39.80006°N 75.46900°W

- Vipassana Meditation Centre (Singapore)
- Abbreviation: VMC
- Formation: 1993
- Type: Theravada
- President: U Ko Sun
- Affiliations: 268A Balestier Road, Singapore
- Website: pabha.com/vmc

Vipassana Meditation Centre is a Buddhist centre in Singapore set up in 1993 to propagate and perpetuating Theravada Buddhism and provide opportunity for the practice of Vipassana meditation in Singapore. This group is not related to non-sectarian society "Vipassana International Center (Singapore)", which offers 10 Day residential meditation courses, taught by SN Goenka, in the tradition of Sayagyi U Ba Khin.

== Overview ==
Vipassana Meditation Centre was founded in 1993 as a non-profit organization with the objective of providing opportunities and a venue for all Buddhists and non-Buddhists alike in cultivating their dhamma practice.

Notable advisors and teachers affiliated with the meditation centre include Ovadacariya Sayadaw U Panditabhivamsa. There are several meditation locations across the world (Examples: Singapore, Australia, China, South Korea)

== See also ==
- Burmese Buddhist Temple
- Palelai Buddhist Temple
- Wat Ananda Metyarama Thai Buddhist Temple
- Sri Lankaramaya Buddhist Temple
- Ti-Sarana Buddhist Association
- Vipassana meditation
- Vipassana movement
- Mindfulness (psychology)
- Acceptance and commitment therapy
- Mindfulness-based stress reduction
- Neural mechanisms of mindfulness meditation
