= Pannavamsa =

Burmese Buddhist missionary monk (1928-2017)

Sayadaw U Pannavamsa
- Title: Agga Mahā Paṇḍitā; Agga Mahā Saddhamma Jotika

Personal life
- Born: 10 January 1928 Wakema, British Burma
- Died: 24 November 2017 (aged 89) Georgetown, Penang, Malaysia

Religious life
- Religion: Buddhism
- Temple: Dhammikarama Burmese Temple, Penang, Malaysia
- School: Theravada
- Dharma name: Paññāvaṃsa

Senior posting
- Awards: Sasanadaja Siripavara Dhammacariya (1953)

U Paññāvaṃsa (Burmese: ဦးပညာဝံသ; Pyinnyawuntha), commonly known as the Penang Sayadaw and officially titled Bhaddantapaññāvaṃsa) was a prominent Burmese Buddhist monk, known for his missionary work, particularly in Sri Lanka and Malaysia. He was first selected to perform missionary work on Coco Islands on behalf of the Burmese government. He was the chief abbot of the Dhammikarama Burmese Temple in Penang, Malaysia, where he resides. He was also abbot over the Burmese Buddhist Temple in Singapore.

== Biography ==
Venerable Sayadaw U Paññāvaṃsa was born at Wakema, Myanmar on 10 January 1928. He was ordained as a novice at the age of fourteen and received higher ordination as Bhikkhu on 16 April 1948. He studied Pali and Buddhism in Wakema, Rangoon and Mandalay's Masoyein Monastery, alongside U Kovida. In 1953, he passed Dhammacariya, the highest monastic examination in Pali, with distinction. The government of Burma awarded him the degree of Sasanadaja Siripavara Dhammacariya (Blessed Noble Dharmafarer, Banner of the Teaching)

In 1954, he was selected by the government of Myanmar for missionary work in Cocos Island, and extended subsequently to Sri Lanka, Andaman Islands and Malaysia. In 1961, the Burmese government sent him to become the chief abbot of the Dhammikarama Burmese Temple in Penang, Malaysia. In Malaysia, from 1970 to 1979, he served as a religious advisor to the Young Buddhist Association of Malaysia and as chief examiner of the Malaysia Buddhist examination syndicate. He founded the Sunday Buddhist Institute, an organization for the study of Buddhism and meditation. In 1979, he became a lecturer in Buddha Abhidhamma at the University of Oriental Studies, Los Angeles.

He has built eight Burmese Buddhist monasteries in cities worldwide like Los Angeles, Sydney, Chicago, Toronto, Singapore, Kuala Lumpur, Rangoon and Auckland between 1979 and 2002. He has written over 9 books in English including titles such as Maha Paritta Pali Sacred Verses, The Dawn of Buddhism and The Ten Perfections. In recognition for his works, the Myanmar government conferred on him the religious titles of Agga Maha Pandita (Foremost Great Wise One) and Agga Maha Saddhamma Jotika (Foremost Great Light of the Sublime Dharma) in 1994 and 1998 respectively.

== Death ==
Paññāvaṃsa died on 24 November 2017 from chronic kidney disease in Penang, Malaysia.
