= Thai New Zealanders =

Thai ethnic group in New Zealand

Thai New Zealanders ไทยนิวซีแลนด์
- (Thailand) (New Zealand)

Total population
- 10,251 (2018 census)

Regions with significant populations
- Wellington

Languages
- New Zealand English, Thai

Religion
- Buddhism, Theravādin, Christianity

Related ethnic groups
- Thai diaspora

Thai New Zealanders are New Zealanders who are of Thai ancestry and Thailand-born immigrants and their descendants born in New Zealand. There could be as many as 50,000 New Zealanders of Thai descent, with a confirmed Thai-born population of 10,251 in the 2018 census.

In 1961, only 41 people were recorded as having been born in Thailand, but this figure rose to over 6,100 in the 2006 NZ census. Some 500 of these live in Wellington, and have their own temple in Karori

Thai New Zealanders are usually Theravādin Buddhists or, more rarely, Christian.

== See also ==
- Demographics of New Zealand
- Immigration to New Zealand
- History of New Zealand
- New Zealand–Thailand relations
- Thai Australians
