= Hong Kong–Thailand relations =

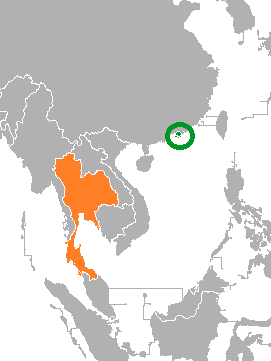
- Hong Kong: Thailand

Hong Kong–Thailand relations are bilateral relations between Hong Kong and Thailand.

== Official relations ==
Thailand has a Consulate-General in Hong Kong, the Royal Thai Consulate-General in Hong Kong, as part of the country's series of diplomatic missions on foreign soil. The first Consul to Hong Kong was appointed in 1868.

The Consulate-General locates at 8 Cotton Tree Drive, Central, Hong Kong Island. Hong Kong has autonomy in the conduct of its external commercial relations, as well as relations in a broad range of appropriate fields.

Hong Kong was represented by the Hong Kong Economic and Trade Office, Singapore in the member states of the ASEAN, including Thailand. The Office have been granted certain privileges and immunities by respective host governments to facilitate the Office to discharge their duties without intervention. Broadly speaking, the privileges and immunities enjoyed by the Office mainly include the inviolability of premises, official correspondence, archives and documents as well as the exemption of premises and representatives from taxation. After the signing of a Free Trade Agreement between Hong Kong and the ASEAN in November 2017, the Hong Kong government announced that they would set up an Economic and Trade Office in Thailand to facilitate further co-operation between the two sides.

== Commercial and social ==
Hong Kong is Thailand's fifth largest export market in 2014, while Thailand is Hong Kong 16th largest export market. Hong Kong occupied 5% of Thai export market, while Thai contributed 0.8% of Hong Kong's data.

Around 30,000 Thais lived in Hong Kong. Among those, many worked as household maids. Thailand is a popular holiday destination for Hongkongers. Hong Kong-Thailand Business Council, chaired by Bernard Charnwut Chan, is a leading Thai business council in Hong Kong.

== Incidents ==
Thaksin Shinawatra was a Thai exiled former prime minister. He was overthrown in the 2006 Thai coup d'état on 19 September 2006. Afterwards, he was in a self-imposed exile. Thai politicians fly to Hong Kong regularly to meet with Thaksin Shinawatra since his exile.

In the Causeway Bay Books disappearances, a Hong Kong bookseller, Gui Minhai, was taken from his home in Pattaya, Thailand, by an unknown man on 17 October 2015 and later reappeared in China as a defendant. Speculation suggested that the Thai government was under Chinese pressure to allow the kidnap of a Hong Kong liberal to happen in Thailand. The Guardian noted that the military junta was becoming increasingly accommodating to Chinese demands, observing that the Thai government had done little to advance the case.

On 5 October 2016, a Hong Kong pro-democracy activist, Joshua Wong, was barred from entering Thailand and deported. He had been invited by a Thai student activist, Netiwit Chotiphatphaisal, to address students at Chulalongkorn University to mark the 40th anniversary of the Thammasat University massacre in 1976. Wong said there had been no explanation for his detention. Thai officials admitted pressure from the Chinese government. Protests were made to the Royal Thai Consulate-General in Hong Kong: 30 Hong Kong Legislative Councillors demanded an explanation and apology from the Thai government.

On 27 April 2017, the Hong Kong Chief Executive, CY Leung, met the Thai Deputy Prime Minister, Somkid Jatusripitak, at Government House, Hong Kong. They exchanged views on Hong Kong's free trade agreement negotiations with the Association of Southeast Asian Nations.

On 4 August 2017, the newly elected Chief Executive of Hong Kong, Carrie Lam, visited Thailand and paid her respects to the late King of Thailand.

== See also ==
- Foreign relations of Hong Kong
- Foreign relations of Thailand
- Thais in Hong Kong
