= Sri Lankaramaya Buddhist Temple =

Buddhist temple in Singapore

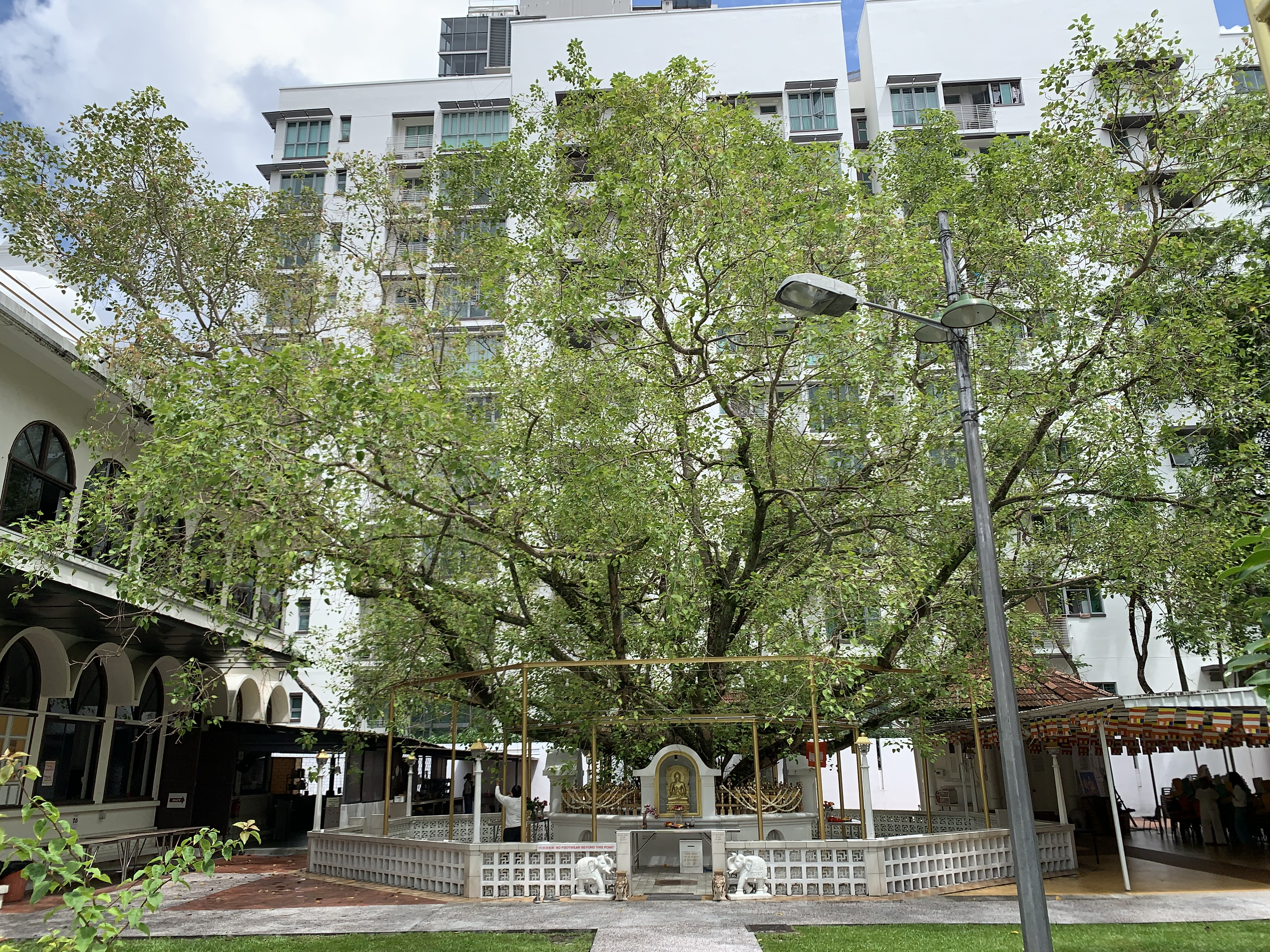
- The Bodhi Tree at Sri Lankaramaya Buddhist Temple in Singapore

- Location within Singapore

Monastery information
- Order: Theravada

Site
- Location: Bendemeer, Singapore
- Coordinates: 1.3269°N 103.8629°E
- Public access: yes
- Website: www.srilankaramaya.sg

The Sri Lankaramaya Buddhist Temple (also known as St Michael Buddhist Temple) is located at St. Michael's Road in Bendemeer, Singapore. The temple is the primary Sri Lanka Buddhist temple of its kind in Singapore. It is one of the Theravada Buddhist temples in Singapore which is founded years back from Buddhist monks from Sri Lanka. It is operated by the Singapore Sinhala Buddhist Association which was established in 1920.

== Brief history ==
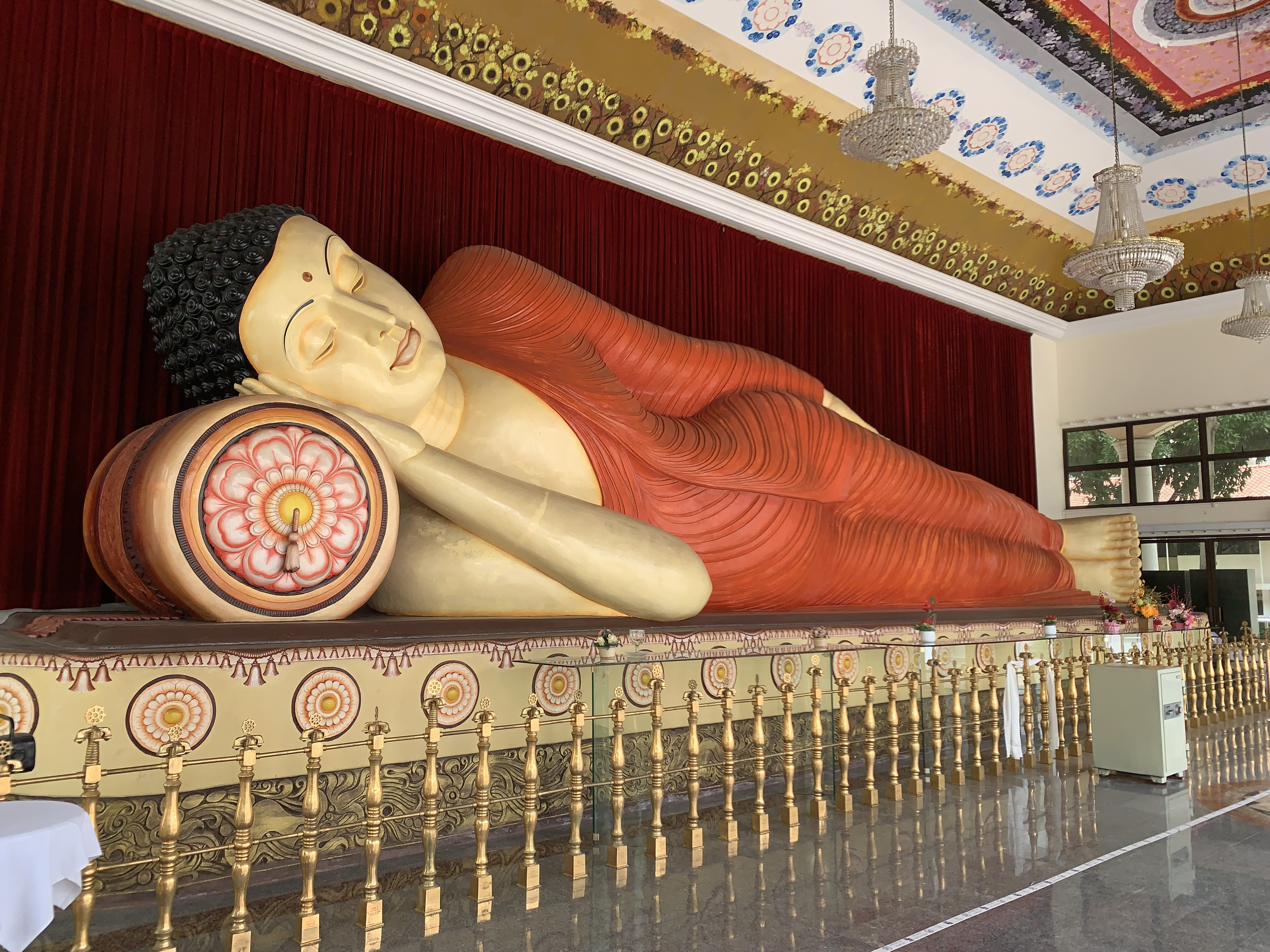
Reclining Buddha at Sri Lankaramya Buddhist Temple, Singapore

Early Sinhalese Buddhist migrants who arrived in Singapore from Sri Lanka sometime in 1920 formed the Singapore Sinhala Buddhist Association and set up the temple giving its name as Sri Lankaramaya Buddhist Temple. Having no fixed place to house the temple initially, the Association moved from pace to place in Short Street, Race Course Road, Dhoby Ghaut, Niven Roa, Wilkie Road and Spottiswood Park to conduct its service. Sometime in 1938, the Association purchased the premises at 263, Outram Road and moved to house the temple where it remained for a few years until the place was overcrowded with the increased number of members and devotee gatherings, thus leaving little space to conduct services. This initiated the move by members of the Association to look for a new and larger temple area. The move was made possible with the arrival of the members of the Ceylon Pioneer Corps to Singapore from Sri Lanka with Lord Mountbatten’s British Forces at the end of World War II in 1945, after surrender of the Japanese. Members of the Ceylon Pioneer Corps, who were ardent Buddhist themselves, sought the vacant piece of land at St Michael’s Road and advised the Association to acquire the two acre land. They also eventually, together with the local Sinhala Buddhist community and well-wishers contributed toward the purchase of the land at St Michael’s Road, with their meager salary and hand Sri Lankaramaya temple moved to where it is today. The first foundation stone of Sri Lankaramaya temple at the new piece of land was laid by his Excellency the late Sir Franklin Gimson, the then British Governor of Singapore on 24 February 1949. The birth of Sri Lankaramaya temple at the new site took place on 11 February 1952 with the brass Buddha statue, which was donated by the late Jawalahal Nehru, the then Prime Minister of India and now sited at the Bodhi Shrine of the temple, was brought in a procession from 263, Outram Road to the new temple premise. The first pile for the temple’s extension programme was driven in by the late Most Venerable Seck Hong Choon, the Chief Abbot of Kong Meng San Phor Kark See Temple on 15 January 1987. Sri Lankaramaya all throughout since its birth has been based and remained on the Theravada Buddhist traditions as practiced in Sri Lanka, with the resident Monks from the Theravada School of Traditions in Sri Lanka, being engaged on yearly term basis to conduct the temple’s religious services and ceremonies.

== Buddha relics ==
Following temples in Singapore have the relics associated with Buddha:

- Buddha Tooth Relic Temple and Museum in Little China
- Foo Hai Ch'an Monastery near Paya Lebar MRT Exit C
- Kong Meng San Phor Kark See Monastery in Bishan
- Thekchen Choling at Jalan Besar
- Sri Lankaramaya Buddhist Temple at St. Michael’s Road in Bandemeer

== Bodhi tree ==
A Bodhi tree (Ficus religiosa), a direct descendant of Indian Bodh Gaya Bodhi tree through Sri Lankan Jaya Sri Maha Bodhi lineage, can be seen in the compound of the temple, with four Buddha images placed on each direction.

== Activities and management ==
The monks conduct regular Dhamma events including sutta discussions, meditation practices, chanting, pujas and blessings for devotees all year round. This temple is also a center for Sri Lankans to celebrate their cultural activities such as New Year in April. Other than that Buddhist festivals are celebrated in each year including Vesak Festival.

== See also ==
- Wat Ananda Metyarama Thai Buddhist Temple
- Burmese Buddhist Temple
- Palelai Buddhist Temple
- Ti-Sarana Buddhist Association
- Vipassana Meditation Centre
- Buddhism in Singapore
