= Burmese Buddhist Temple (Singapore) =

Buddhist temple in Singapore

- 缅甸玉佛寺
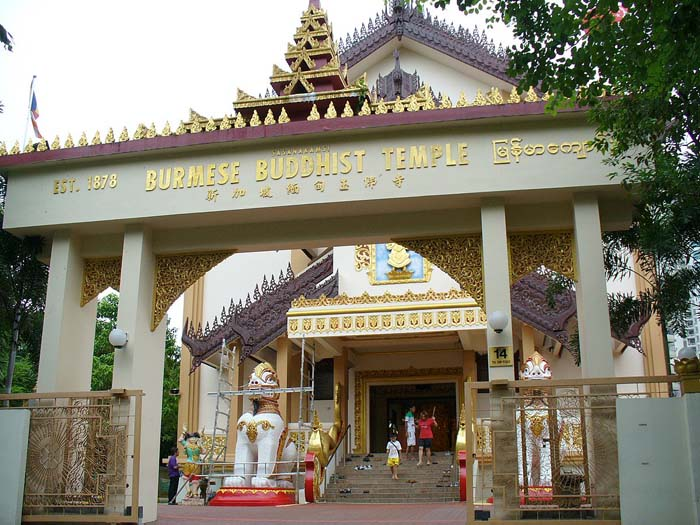
- The Burmese Buddhist Temple at 14 Tai Gin Road
- Interactive map of Burmese Buddhist Temple

Monastery information
- Full name: Maha Sasana Ramsi
- Order: Theravada
- Established: 1875

People
- Founders: U Thar Hnin, U Kyaw Gaung
- Abbot: Sayadaw U Pannavamsa

Site
- Location: Novena, Singapore
- Coordinates: 01°19′42.30″N 103°50′48.74″E
- Public access: yes

The Burmese Buddhist Temple (also known as Mahā Sāsanā Raṃsī; Burmese: မဟာသာသနာ့ရံသီ မြန်မာဘုရားကျောင်း; Chinese: 缅甸玉佛寺; pinyin: Miǎndiàn yùfósì) is the oldest Theravada institution and the only Burmese Buddhist temple of its kind in Singapore. Founded in 1875, the temple moved from its original Kinta Road premises to Tai Gin Road off Ah Hood Road in Novena in 1988. The temple houses the largest pure white marble statue of the Buddha outside Myanmar, and has become a religious landmark for Burmese and Singaporean devotees to make merit and take part in merit-sharing activities alike.

== History ==
The Burmese Buddhist Temple (BBT) was founded by a Burmese man named U Thar Hnin, also known as Tang Sooay Chin, at 17 Kinta Road (off Serangoon Road) in 1875. In 1878, U Thar Hnin donated the temple to U Kyaw Gaung (also known as Khoo Teogou), a traditional Burmese physician. The temple houses the largest pure white marble statue of the Buddha outside of Myanmar. It is also the only Burmese Buddhist temple built outside of Myanmar in the traditional Burmese architectural style.

=== Mission ===
U Kyaw Gaung, also known as Khoo Teogou, was born in Mandalay, Myanmar in 1866. He arrived in Singapore at an early age and was later joined by his wife Daw Khin Mae and their three children. Coming from a land of great Buddhist influence, it was U Kyaw Gaung's ambition to introduce Theravada Buddhism in Singapore.

In 1907, he was elected as trustee of the temple. While administering the temple, he dreamt of acquiring a sizable marble Buddha statue such as those seen in Myanmar. Undaunted by limited funds, U Kyaw Gaung pledged to carry out the mammoth task. He raised funds from his own earnings and public donations. After several trips to Myanmar, an immense piece of marble weighing more than 10 tons from Sagyin Hill, 50 kilometres (31 mi) north of Mandalay, was sighted. Sagyin Hill was famous in Myanmar for its superior quality marble. The stone was bought for Rs1,200 and delivered to Mandalay, a city reputed for its skilled craftsmanship. Eventually, a Buddha image measuring 3 metres (9.8 ft) in height was sculpted out from the stone in 1918.

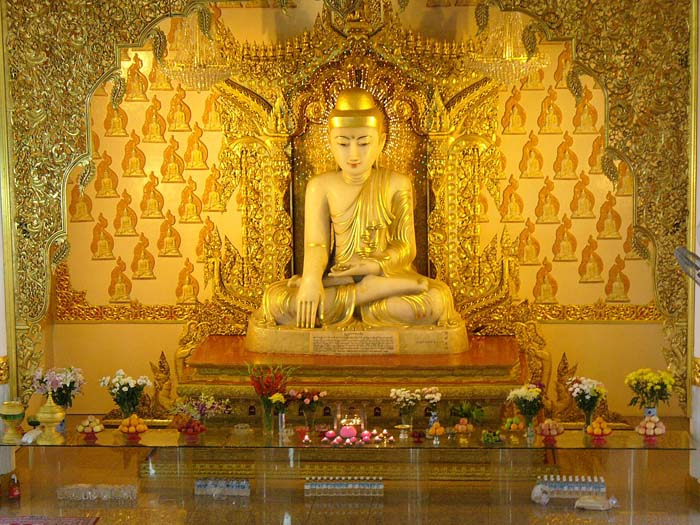
The white marble Buddha statue inside the main Shrine Hall is the largest of its kind outside Myanmar

Despite the lack of modern transportation and heavy machinery at that time, and the numerous challenges he faced during the arduous 2,500 kilometres (1,600 mi) journey over land and sea, U Kyaw Gaung successfully transported the completed Buddha statue to Singapore in 1921 intact with assistance from the late Aw Boon Par of Tiger Balm fame and the royal patronage of the Minn family. The marble statue was at first housed in a shed known as "Buddha Wehara". In 1925, it was moved to Kinta Road where it was housed in a private chamber. This chamber became a shrine hall where devotees paid homage to the Buddha. In 1935, U Kyaw Gaung died at the age of 69 and the temple was partially converted into a private residence. Today, it is under the custody of the Minn family.

=== Relocation ===
In 1981, the family of the late U Kyaw Gaung was served a notice by the Urban Redevelopment Authority to vacate their house. Following the Government's resettlement programme, the temple was relocated on Tai Gin Road in 1988 where it stands today. Under the guidance of the temple's Spiritual Advisor, Sayadaw U Pannavamsa, together with the combined efforts of the resident monks, members of the public, and well-wishers, the new temple building was officially opened in 1991. The temple has intricate Burmese architectural style with teak wood carvings that were donated by the Tripitaka Nikaya Main Ministrative Body (Ti Ni) of Myanmar.

== Bodhi tree ==
A Bodhi tree (Ficus religiosa), can be seen in the compound of the temple. It was grown from a seed from its parent tree at Mangala Vihara Buddhist Temple at 30 Jalan Eunos, Singapore. A Buddha image is placed under the Bodhi tree to remind people that Sakyamuni Buddha attained Enlightenment while meditating under a Bo tree at Bodh Gaya, in the Ganges valley, around 600 BCE. It was nurtured by the late Madam Boey, a devotee of Mangala Vihara Temple. Its parent tree was a sapling brought to Singapore from Sri Lankan Jaya Sri Maha Bodhi lineage by Venerable Mahinda, the son of Ashoka the Great of India, which was a descendant of the Bodh Gaya Bodhi tree under which the Buddha attained Enlightenment.

== Activities and management ==
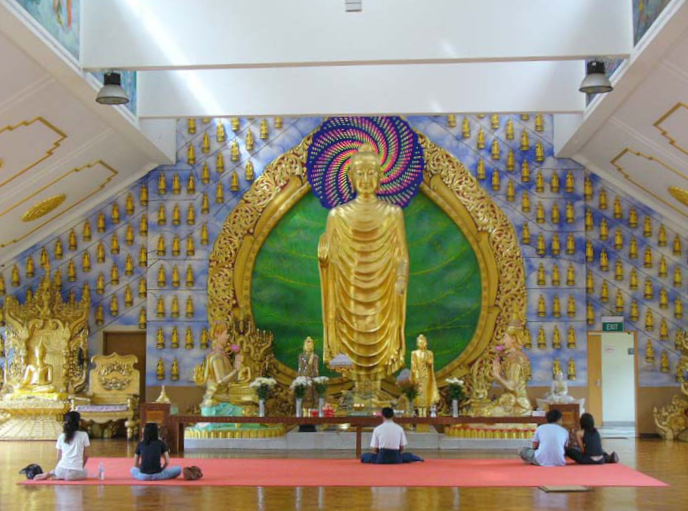
The Meditation Hall of the temple allows devotees to practise Vipassana (insight) meditation in quiet surroundings

The temple's resident Sangha consists of four Burmese monks headed by Sayadaw U Pannavamsa while the management of the temple's operations is run by a management committee that consists of devotees from the Burmese and Singaporean communities. The monks conduct regular Dhamma talks, chants and blessings for devotees all year round. Its annual calendar of events includes New Year special offering to the Sangha; Chinese New Year's Eve chanting; observances of the Water Festival (Thin Gyan) and Vesak Day; the Vassa (Rain Retreat) offering of robes; the Kathina celebration; and a novitiate programme. Weekly activities include Dharma and Abhidhamma classes, puja, meditation and Dhammacakka chanting.

== See also ==
- Sayadaw U Paññāvaṃsa
- Wat Ananda Metyarama Thai Buddhist Temple
- Palelai Buddhist Temple
- Sri Lankaramaya Buddhist Temple
- Ti-Sarana Buddhist Association
- Vipassana Meditation Centre
- Buddhism in Singapore
- Dhammikarama Burmese Temple, Penang

== Bibliography ==
- Burmese Buddhist Temple Newsletter, vol. 10, no. 1, July 1996.
- Burmese Buddhist Temple Newsletter, vol. 21, no. 2, January 2007.
- Ong, Y. D. (2005). Buddhism in Singapore – A Short Narrative History. Singapore: Skylark Publications. ISBN 978-981-05-2740-2.
- Than, Mya (2001). In Commemoration of the Grand Opening of Burmese Buddhist Temple. Singapore: Burmese Buddhist Temple.
