= Palelai Buddhist Temple =

Buddhist temple in Bedok, Singapore

- Location within Singapore
- Interactive map of Palelai Buddhist Temple

Monastery information
- Full name: Palelai Buddhist Temple
- Order: Theravada
- Established: 3 April 1962; 64 years ago

People
- Founder: Phrakhru Prakassa Dhammakhun

Site
- Location: 49 Bedok Walk, Singapore 469145
- Country: Singapore
- Coordinates: 1°19′52.30″N 103°56′47.05″E
- Public access: Yes
- Website: www.palelaibuddhisttemple.org

Palelai Buddhist Temple is a Buddhist temple located in Bedok, Singapore. It was founded in 1962 by Phrakhru Prakassa Dhammakhun (known mostly as Luang Phor).

== History ==
Palelai Buddhist temple was originally located at 9 Jalan Nipah and subsequently moved to 49 Bedok Walk to accommodate the growing number of members and devotees. When the temple building was first built at Jalan Nipah, it occupied a land area of only 6 metres by 12 metres. This was sufficient to house three Thai bhikkhus and samaneras. The building was compartmentalised into three sections: one section for the main shrine hall, another section as a multipurpose hall, and the rear section as living quarters. A Thai-style pavilion was added to the building in 1967 with the intention of using it as a proper shrine hall.

This building served to facilitate the study and learning of the Dhamma in the Thai tradition. Sunday school as well as Dhamma talks on the life of the Buddha and on Buddhism were conducted regularly at the temple. These served to propagate the Buddhist teachings to the community. To cope with the need of the growing number of Buddhists, Luang Phor had contemplated buying the neighbouring land to increase the land area. However, because the seller asked a high price for the land and the government had zoned the area for road enlargement, the plan was put on hold.

Moving Palelai Buddhist Temple to Bedok Walk was mooted in 1968. That year Luang Phor met a wealthy Singaporean, Wee Thiam Siew, who was a Buddhist and owned the plot of land at Bedok Walk that the temple currently occupies. Through his charitable generosity, he sold the plot of land at half the original price. The purchase of the land was funded by voluntary contributions from Thai, Malaysian, and Singaporean Buddhists.

Construction of the temple was made possible through financial support from the Buddhist communities in Singapore, Malaysia, and Thailand, with some assistance from the Department of Religious Affairs of Thailand. Construction took place in 1970 with the foundation stone laid by the Supreme Patriarch Punnasiri Mahathera of Wat Phra Jetuphon in Bangkok. The building was completed in phases and finally consecrated in May 1973. This new location allowed more devotees to participate in the regular Buddhist activities organized at the temple.

In 2004, the Executive Committee decided to build an additional building to support the growing number of activities and interests of members and devotees in the areas of meditation and Buddhist education.

== See also ==
- Wat Ananda Metyarama Thai Buddhist Temple
- Burmese Buddhist Temple
- Sri Lankaramaya Buddhist Temple
- Ti-Sarana Buddhist Association
- Vipassana Meditation Centre
- Buddhism in Singapore

== External references ==
- sites.google.com/site/watpalelai/home
