= Thais in Hong Kong =

- (Thailand) (Hong Kong)

Total population
- 30,000 (2011 Census)

Religion
- Theravada Buddhism

Related ethnic groups
- Thai people

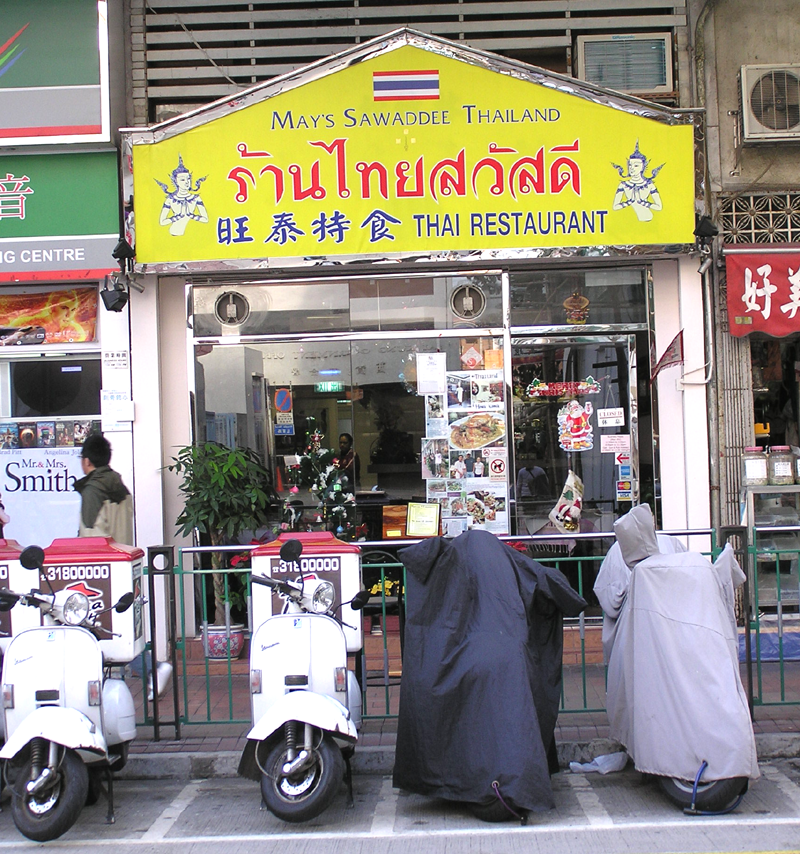
A Thai-owned restaurant in Sai Kung

Thais in Hong Kong form one of the smaller populations of ethnic minorities in Hong Kong, and a minor portion of the worldwide Thai diaspora.

== Migration history ==
Beginning in the 1970s, there was a trend for some Hong Kong men to marry Thai women living in Kowloon City. Yet their reason for immigration is not only for marriage. Historically, Thailand has had both high women’s workforce participation and a history of migration. It is common for Thais to engage in migration, seeking specialised skills, better land or enhanced household resources. Also, in the 1990s the labour demand in the Asia region increased for the political situation of Asian region like Hong Kong was seen as “safer” than the Middle East so more women migrated here to work. Thai Chinese also emigrated to Hong Kong in the 1980s and 1990s.

According to the Hong Kong census, Thais are one of the few ethnic minority groups in Hong Kong whose population has fallen in the past decade. The 2001 census recorded 14,342, or about 4.2% of the total non-Chinese population of 343,950. The 2006 Hong Kong by-census reported 11,900, or 3.5% of the total non-Chinese population of 342,198. The 2011 Hong Kong census recorded 11,213 Thais making up around 2.5% of the total non-Chinese population of 451,183.

Thai politicians regularly fly to Hong Kong to meet with exiled former prime minister Thaksin Shinawatra.

== Employment ==
According to the 2006 Census report, the Thai working force in Hong Kong forms about 7,414 people out the whole Thai population of 11,900 in Hong Kong. 71.9% of the working force consists of domestic helpers, whose median income is $4,000. Due to the rapid growth of Thailand's economy, labor costs for Thais have increased significantly and enhanced job opportunities back home meant that few Thais went overseas as domestic helpers. Consequently, the majority of households in Hong Kong employs domestic helpers from countries with cheaper wages such as the Philippines and Indonesia. The minimum wage for domestic helpers in Hong Kong is HKD3,270 as of 2005, adjusted downwards from HKD3,670; an additional levy on the salary is supposed to be paid by the employer, but the Thai Ministry of Labour reported in 2005 that employers often forced the employee to pay this levy instead.

Other common professions include cleaners, waiters/waitresses, hairdressers, and bank officers. A minority of Thais in Hong Kong, such as the Sophonpanich family, Kanjanapas family and Chearavanont family are businesspeople or investors; a large proportion of Thailand's outward investment in newly industrialised economies goes to Hong Kong. Direct investment by Thais in Hong Kong peaked in 1996 and then fell due to the 1997 East Asian financial crisis.

== Festivals and religion ==
The majority of Thais in Hong Kong are adherents of Theravada Buddhism. In Hong Kong, there are four Thai Buddhist temples altogether and they are located in Ngau Tam Mei of Yuen Long, Shun Shan San Tsuen of Shap Pat Heung, Ha Pak Nai of Tuen Mun and Tai Po Tai Wo. Thais celebrate their new year on 13 to 15 April in the "Songkran Festival". According to the Thai calendar, 13 April is the end of the old year while 15 April is the beginning of a new year. 14 April is usually regarded as the preparation for the new coming year. On this festival, there would be celebration by splashing water to each other. It signifies the washing-away of bad luck and welcoming good luck, prospects and happiness. They also put some bath powder on their face, which traditionally means protecting their skin. On the Sunday that is nearest to Songkran Festival, some of them will visit the temple for merit-making while a majority of Thai people living in Kowloon City process through Tak Ku Ling Road, proceed along the Kai Tak Road and Lung Kong Road and continuously splash water for an hour.

== Community organisations ==
Thai Regional Alliance (TRA) is an organisation which helps Thai foreign domestic helpers in Hong Kong to gain rights and to educate them about workers’ situation in both Hong Kong and Thailand (e.g. providing welfare services such as counselling and legal support). It links up with different Thai groups, NGOs and individuals both in Thailand and in Hong Kong and also in other parts of the world. The TRA is one of the founders and remains to be an active member of the Asian Migrant’s Coordinating Body (AMCB) and has been greatly involved in many coalition’s campaigns and activities (e.g. helping to gain minimum allowable wage, the suspension of the levy). By convincing Thai migrant workers to join and be active in their campaigns, TRA has enhanced the coherence between them and the foreign labour campaigns in Hong Kong to a certain extent.

Besides taking part in labour movements, TRA aims at enhancing the Thai community spirit and promotes friendship in Hong Kong. To ally the Thai migrant groups, TRA organises functions regularly, for instance, the celebration of SongKran Festival in April annually. Moreover, to assist Thais to obtain better job and employment opportunities, the TRA conducts language courses (English and Cantonese) for them, especially for domestic helpers. In 2008, there were around 120 people who attended the English class while 13 people went to the Cantonese class. They also conduct Thai massage workshops for Thai workers. Their objective is to help migrant workers with skills for their use back to Thailand. Many domestic helpers who have children at their employers’ homes would also like to join the computer basic workshops too.

== See also ==
- Hong Kong–Thailand relations
