= Sembawang (disambiguation) =

Sembawang is a planning area and residential town located in the North Region of Singapore.

Sembawang may also refer to:

- Sembawang Air Base, a military airbase of the Republic of Singapore Air Force (RSAF)
- Sembawang Bus Interchange, a bus interchange in Sembawang, Singapore
- Sembawang circuit
- Sembawang Constituency, a single member constituency in Sembawang, Singapore
- Sembawang Group Representation Constituency, a Group Representation Constituency (GRC) in the northern area of Singapore
- Sembawang Hot Spring Park, a natural hot spring and a public park in Singapore
- Sembawang Library, a public library in Sembawang, Singapore
- Sembawang MRT station, a Mass Rapid Transit (MRT) station in Sembawang, Singapore
- Sembawang Naval Base
- Sembawang Park, a 15-hectare park situated in Sembawang
- Sembawang Primary School
- Sembawang Rangers FC, a professional football club in Singapore
- Sembawang Secondary School, a co-educational government secondary school in Sembawang, Singapore
- Sembawang Shopping Centre, a four-storey commercial development
- Sembawang tree
