= Canberra MRT station =

Mass Rapid Transit station in Singapore

Canberra NS12 坎贝拉 கென்பரா
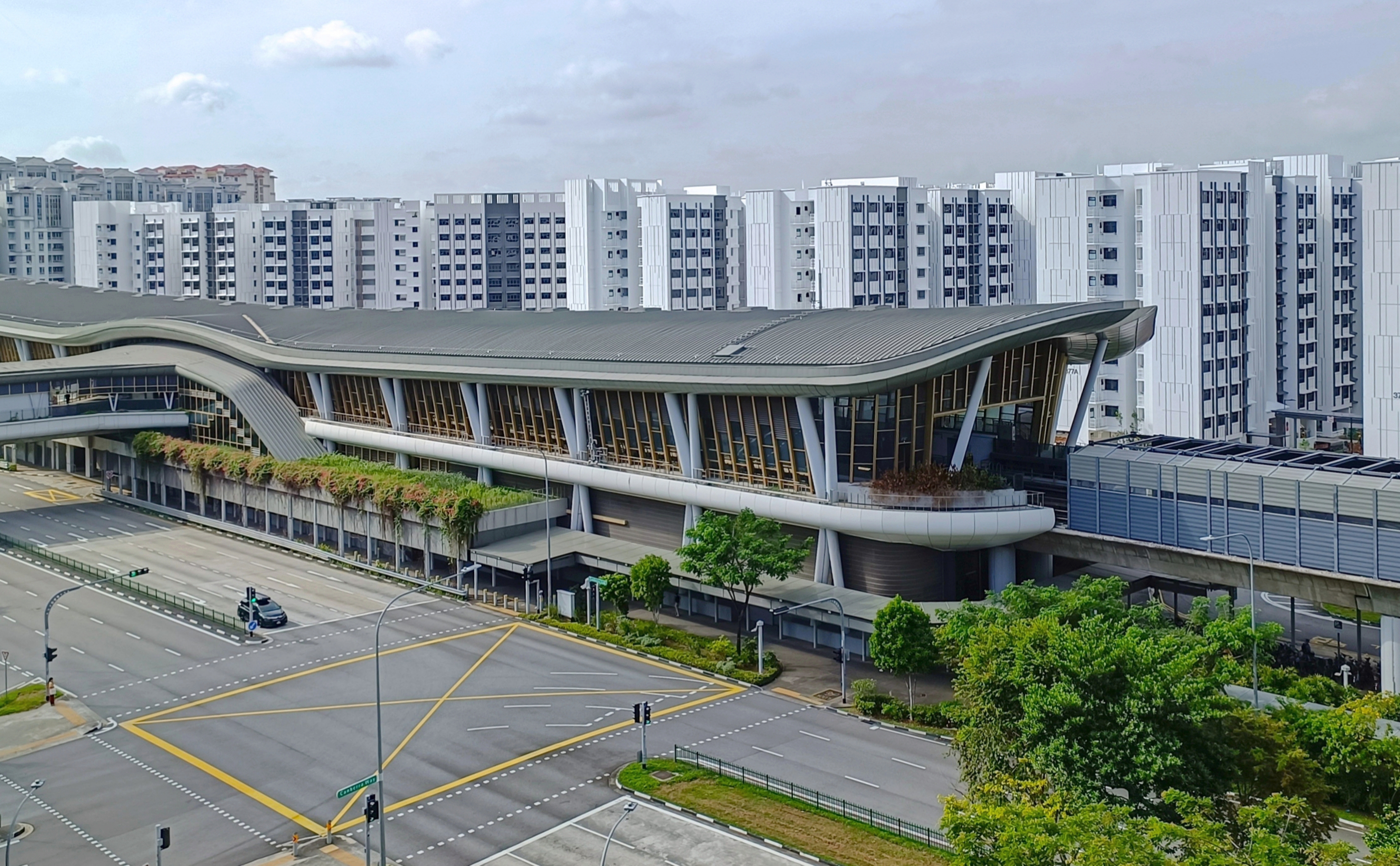
- Exterior of Canberra station

General information
- Location: 11 Canberra Link, Singapore 756972
- Coordinates: 01°26′35″N 103°49′47″E
- System: Mass Rapid Transit (MRT) station
- Owner: Land Transport Authority
- Operator: SMRT Trains
- Line: North–South Line
- Platforms: 2 (2 side platforms)
- Tracks: 2
- Bus routes: 117, 117M, 169, 861, 883, 883M
- Connections: Bus, Taxi

Construction
- Structure type: Elevated
- Platform levels: 1
- Cycle facilities: Yes (~500 lots)
- Accessible: Yes
- Architect: RSP Architects Planners & Engineers

Other information
- Station code: CBR

History
- Opened: 2 November 2019; 7 years ago
- Electrified: Yes (Third rail electrification)

Passengers
- June 2024: 15,240 per day

Services
Preceding station	Mass Rapid Transit	Following station
Sembawang towards Jurong East	North–South Line	Yishun towards Marina South Pier
Track layout
Location
- Location within Singapore Rail

Canberra MRT station is an elevated Mass Rapid Transit (MRT) station on the North–South Line, located along Canberra Link at the junction with Canberra Way in Sembawang, Singapore. It is the second infill station on the MRT network (after Dover MRT station), and the first in Singapore with a platform linked directly to an overhead bridge at the same level. With several green features included in the station during construction, it was also the first MRT station to be awarded Platinum for the Building and Construction Authority's Green Mark for Transit Stations, as a result of the construction team's efforts to integrate landscaping and using eco-friendly materials in the construction of the station.

An infill station between the Sembawang and Yishun MRT stations was included as part of the 2013 Land Transport Master Plan. Following feasibility studies by the Land Transport Authority (LTA), construction of the station started in April 2015. Canberra station opened on 2 November 2019, with the mall opposite the station, Canberra Plaza, opening on 18 December 2020.

== History ==
=== Planning ===
External images
- Artist impression of Canberra MRT station and image of the station's construction progress in April 2018 Source: LTA
- Annex of the location of crossover track at Canberra MRT station Source: LTA

The North–South Line, Singapore's first MRT line, opened in stages in 1987. The stations from Yew Tee to Sembawang were later opened in 1996 as part of the Woodlands Extension, with missing station codes NS6 and NS12 (initially N19 and N13 respectively) reserved for future stations along the line.

Both the Land Transport Master Plan 2013 (launched by then-Minister for Transport Lui Tuck Yew in October) and the Draft Master Plan 2013 (unveiled by the Urban Redevelopment Authority during a public exhibition in November) mentioned the possible addition of a new MRT station between Sembawang and Yishun stations. After a year of review, the Draft Master Plan 2013 was officially gazetted to become the Master Plan 2014 in June of that year.

Between January 2013 and June 2014, in response to these master plans, the Land Transport Authority (LTA) started feasibility studies for a new station between Sembawang and Yishun stations in tandem with developments in the northern part of Singapore. Minister Lui concluded that the station could be built, and on 1 August that year, Canberra station was officially announced by the LTA.

=== Construction ===
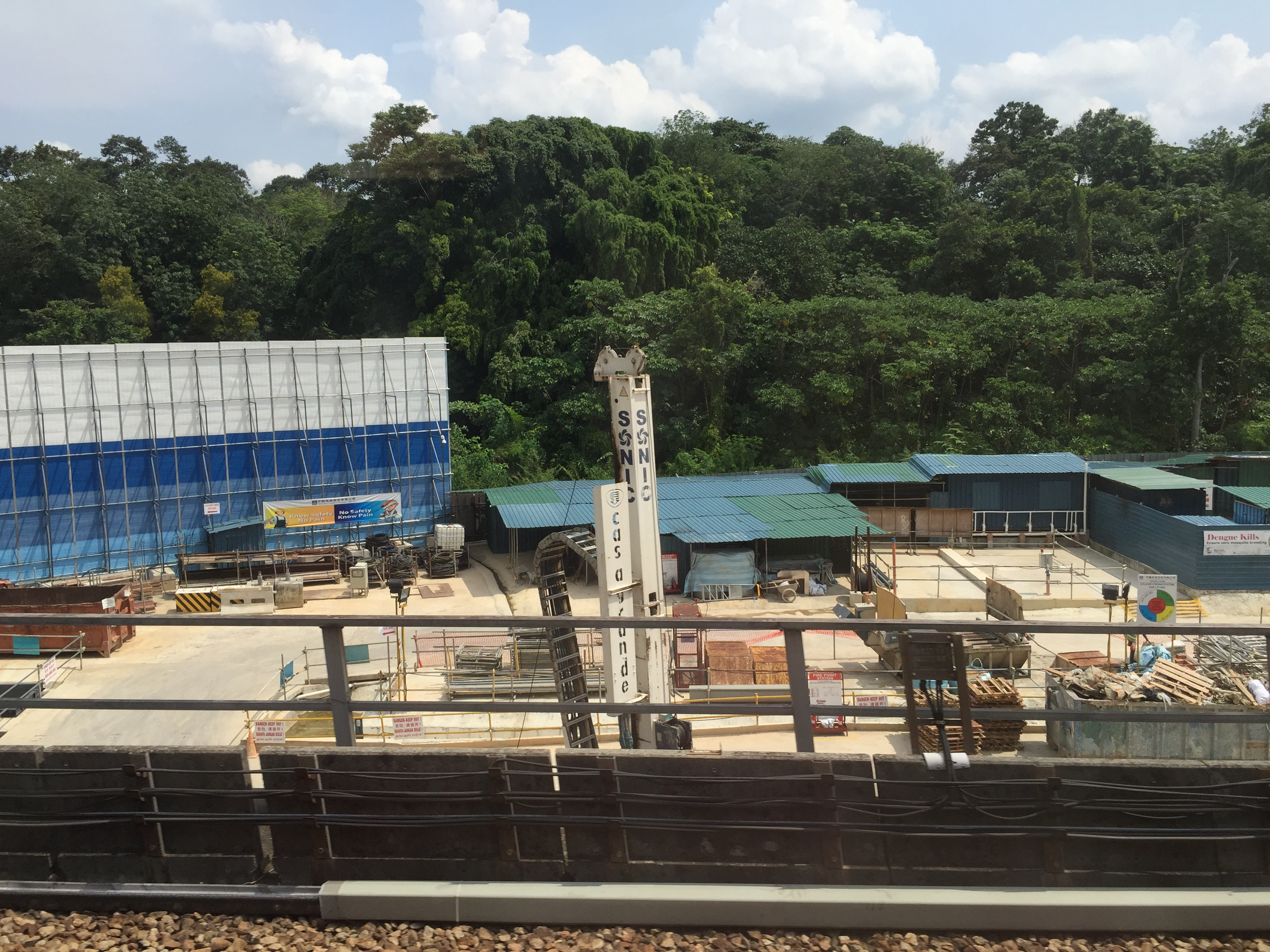
Construction site of the station in July 2016.

The estimated cost for the entire station was S$228 million (US$169.04 million). On 27 April 2015, LTA awarded Contract 158 to China State Construction Engineering Corporation (Singapore Branch) for the design and construction of Canberra Station at a contract sum of S$90 million (US$65.46 million).

Heavy construction work began on 26 March 2016, following the fatal Pasir Ris rail accident on 22 March where two SMRT maintenance workers were killed by an incoming train while performing maintenance on the tracks. This tragedy shined a spotlight on the need for safety for all rail operations involving workers working close to an operational line. As a result of the accident, LTA and SMRT implemented several measures to improve safety such as limiting major work to non-service hours, sheltering the tracks with a temporary enclosure during the roof's construction and creating a full-scale mock-up of the station structure and roof to determine the safest method of construction.

By September 2017, the station was 40% complete, with its deep foundation works in place and construction proceeding to the next stage where platform slabs were cast. By May 2018, the station was 55% complete, with most of its roof structure in place. Between 18 and 20 May 2019, a 72-metre-long (236 ft) rail crossover track was constructed at the northern end of Canberra station to connect the two tracks. The crossover track was built partly to reduce the impact of future rail disruption, such as the power outage that occurred on 7 July 2015, by allowing trains to switch to the unaffected track using the crossover.

During a visit to the station's construction site on 20 May 2019, Minister for Transport Khaw Boon Wan announced that the station would open on 2 November that year. An official opening ceremony, inaugurated by Khaw, was held on the day before its opening. In 2021, the construction of the station won the Construction Excellence Award awarded by the Building and Construction Authority of Singapore.

== Station details ==
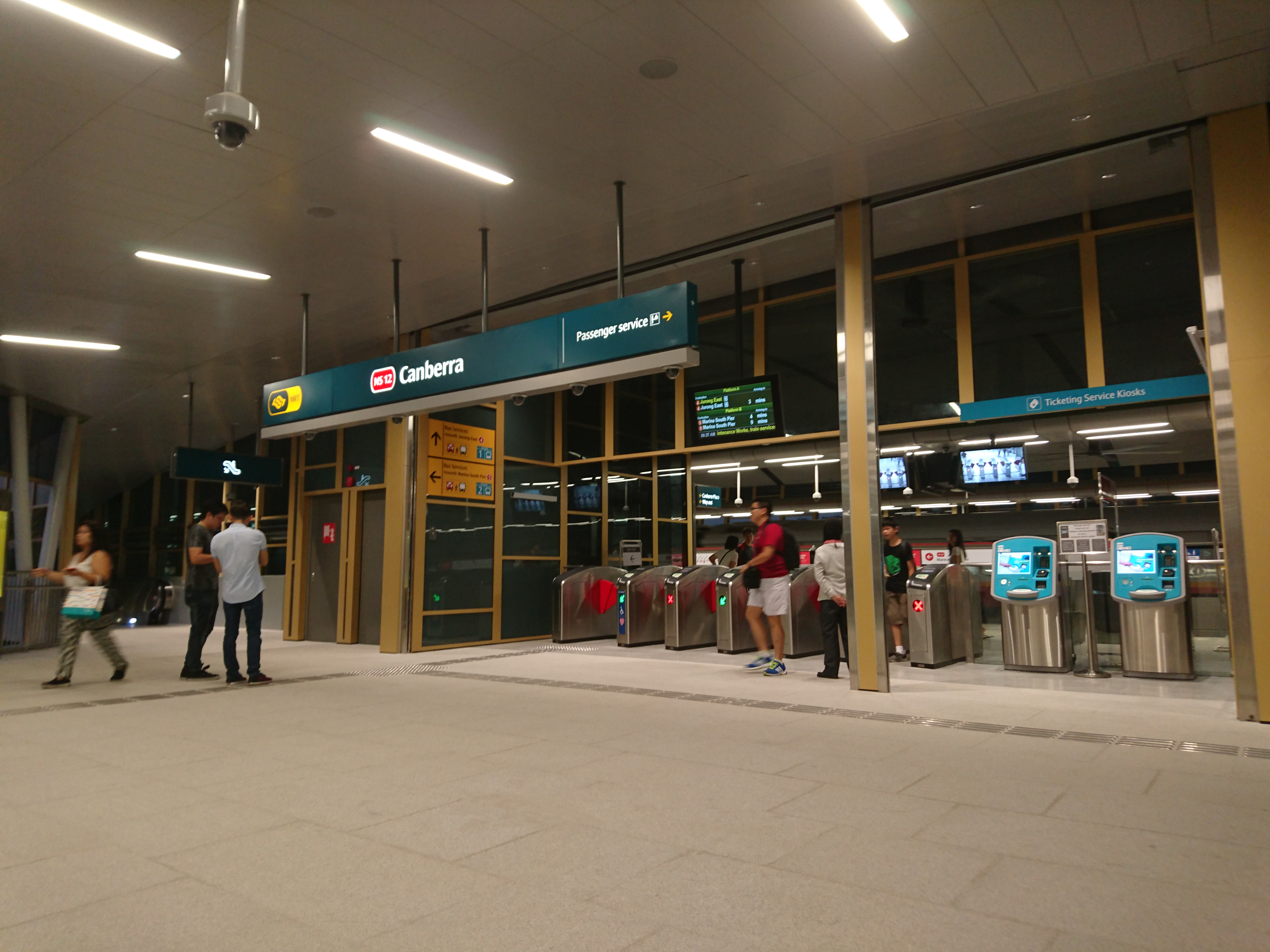
A ticket concourse of the station directly linking it to the Marina South Pier-bound platform. The entrance is connected to the Canberra Plaza via an elevated overhead bridge.

Canberra station is located in the eastern part of Sembawang, next to the residential town of Yishun and near Sungei Simpang Kiri river. An estimated 17,000 households are expected to benefit from the station. The station takes its name from Canberra Link, the road beside which it is located. This road is named after Canberra, the capital of Australia. The station serves the North–South Line, and is situated between the Sembawang and Yishun stations. The official station code is NS12.

RSP Architects Planners & Engineers and KTP Consultants (the latter of which is now a subsidiary of Surbana Jurong) designed the station with a nautical theme; thus, the station is shaped like a ship when viewed from the outside. This design was inspired by Sembawang's historical role as a British naval base. The station's roof is modelled after wind blades to convey the speed of Singapore's public transportation. The sides of the station were constructed using glass rather than concrete to allow natural light to enter. Louvers were installed to provide ventilation. For the construction team's efforts to integrate landscaping and the use of eco-friendly materials, the station was awarded a Platinum certification under the Building and Construction Authority's new Green Mark scheme for transit stations. Canberra station is the first MRT station to attain such a rating.

The artwork in the station, Symbiosis, was painted by Singaporean artist Tan Zi Xi. It aims to emphasise the symbiotic relationship between flora and fauna. Residents and stakeholders from the nearby Sembawang Group Representation Constituency contributed to the artwork by drawing imaginative plants and animals after a workshop that involved a nature walk. Tan developed her drawings further to suit the lively design of the station.

A mural created by Kevin Lee and edited and designed by Monica Lim and Chris Lim. As a part of the heritage-themed Comic Connect public art display by SMRT, the mural depicts a juxtaposed version of Beaulieu House as a naval office in the past and part of Sembawang Park in the present, Sembawang Hot Spring Park, and Bukit Canberra.

The station has five entrances. Four of these are connected by covered pathways to a pair of bus stops, two passenger drop off and pick-up points and parking for over 500 bicycles. The fifth is a sheltered footbridge built across Canberra Link which allows passengers to bypass the concourse level and access the Marina South Pier-bound (city-bound) platform directly. The bridge is linked to Canberra Plaza, a three-story shopping mall project by the HDB as part of a mixed-use transit-oriented development.
