= Canberra (disambiguation) =

Canberra is the capital city of Australia. It may also refer to:

== Aircraft ==
- English Electric Canberra, a British jet bomber
  - Martin B-57 Canberra, a version produced in the United States
- de Havilland DH.72 Canberra, an experimental biplane bomber
- de Havilland Giant Moth or Canberra, a 1920s biplane transport
  - Canberra, a Giant Moth used by Les Holden for a charter operation based in Sydney, Australia

== Ships ==
- HMAS Canberra (D33), a County-class cruiser launched in 1927
- HMAS Canberra (FFG 02), an Adelaide-class guided missile frigate launched in 1978
- HMAS Canberra (L02), lead vessel of the Canberra-class landing helicopter docks, launched in 2011
- PS Canberra, a paddle steamer built in 1912
- SS Canberra, an ocean liner that served in the Falklands war
- USS Canberra (CA-70), a Baltimore-class cruiser of the United States Navy
- USS Canberra (LCS-30), a littoral combat ship of the United States Navy

== Places ==
- Civic, Australian Capital Territory, Canberra's central business district
- Division of Canberra, an Australian electoral division
- Canberra Avenue, Canberra
- Canberra Parish, a former parish of Murray County, New South Wales, Australia
- Canberra MRT station, Singapore
- Canberra railway station, Canberra, Australia

== Sports ==
- Canberra Raiders, an Australian rugby league club
- Canberra FC, an Australian football club
- Canberra International, a women's tennis tournament held in Canberra, Australia (2001–2006)

== Other uses ==
- University of Canberra
- Hotel Canberra, Canberra, Australia

== See also ==
- Bukit Canberra, integrated sports and community hub, Singapore
- Canberra Deep Space Communications Complex, Tidbinbilla, near Canberra, Australia
- Canberra distance, a distance function
- City of Canberra (disambiguation)
