= Murder of Yuen Swee Hong =

2009 murder of a taxi driver in Singapore

Yuen Swee Hong
- Born: Yuen Swee Hong; 4 July 1951; Singapore
- Died: 11 April 2009 (aged 57); Sembawang, Singapore
- Cause of death: Murdered
- Occupation: Taxi driver
- Employer: SMRT
- Known for: Murder victim
- Spouse: Chan Oi Lin
- Children: 2

On 11 April 2009, 57-year-old SMRT taxi driver Yuen Swee Hong (Chinese: 袁水鸿; Jyutping: Jyun4 Seoi2 Hung4; pinyin: Yuán Shuǐhóng) was robbed and murdered in his taxi. After killing Yuen, the culprit, 29-year-old Chinese national Wang Wenfeng (Chinese: 王文锋; pinyin: Wáng Wénfēng; Pe̍h-ōe-jī: Ông Bûn-hong), called Yuen's family demanding for ransom.

Wang was found guilty of murder and initially condemned to death in September 2011, but was re-sentenced to life imprisonment and 24 strokes of the cane in November 2013.

== Crime ==
=== Robbery and murder ===
In the early hours of 11 April 2009, Wang left his home with a haversack containing a knife, a pair of cotton gloves and a small bottle of water. He walked to Sun Plaza in Sembawang, planning to rob a taxi driver, where Yuen picked him up. Wang directed Yuen to the vicinity of Sembawang Park. As they approached the dead end of Jalan Selimang, Wang put on his gloves and took out his knife. He ordered Yuen to turn off the engine; Yuen initially resisted but eventually complied. He then demanded that Yuen hand over his money, which Yuen complied. Following this, Wang released his grip and lost his balance, and Yuen grabbed Wang's left hand which was holding the knife. A struggle ensued; due to Wang's inconsistent testimonies and Yuen's highly decomposed body being unable to provide much forensic evidence, the sequence of events from this point on is unclear and was heavily debated in court.

=== Ransom demands ===
When Yuen, who usually returned home at 8am every morning after finishing his night shift, had not returned that day, his wife Chan Oi Lin (Chinese: 曾爱琳; pinyin: Zēng Àilín; Pha̍k-fa-sṳ: Chhèn Oi-lìm) attempted to call him. After several attempts, her call was answered by Wang, who said that Yuen was in his hands and demanded for $150,000 for his release. Chan pleaded with him to reduce the sum as she did not have enough money. Chan then contacted her daughter and Yuen's sister before calling the police.

Wang called and instructed her to deliver the money to Sengkang MRT station by 3pm. At about 3.00pm Chan received another call. This time, she told Wang that her relatives from Malaysia were coming with the money and she needed more time. Wang said he would call again the next day.

The next day, Wang called again at about 10am. This time, she was told to deliver the money at Marsiling MRT station. Upon arriving, Chan waited for an hour before Wang contacted her again. He sent a SMS of a bank account number and instructed her to remit the money into the account. Chan did not comply as she felt Wang would not release Yuen.

=== Police investigations ===
While ransom negotiations were ongoing, police were using GPS to search for Yuen's taxi. It was eventually found at 11.35pm on 11 April, abandoned in a multi-storey car park at Canberra Road. The cabin was stained with a large amount of blood. From here, police knew Yuen was very badly injured and they had to find him quickly.

Wang was arrested on 13 April at Pearl's Centre, just as he had collected his flight ticket back to China. During interrogations, he was initially uncooperative and completely denied his involvement in Yuen's disappearance, while making up stories and led the police on several wild goose chases. Wang would only lead the police to Yuen's body on 17 April, six days after he was killed. At this point, the body was heavily decomposed and the forensic pathologist, Dr Gilbert Lau, was unable to certify the cause of death.

== Background of Wang Wenfeng ==
Wang Wenfeng was born sometime in 1979 in Fujian, China. In 2000, he married Gong Wenying, who was from Hubei. They have a daughter who was born in 2002. Wang first came to Singapore to work in 2005 but returned to China after one and a half years due to meagre wages. He returned to Singapore in early 2008 and worked as a carpenter. However he was unable to secure a permanent job and could only get casual work. In April 2008 he returned to China and came back to Singapore with his wife, Gong, with a view to her working here as well. In Singapore the couple lived separately, only meeting once or twice a month. Gong worked in a factory on a permanent night shift while Wang took up any manual job he could find.

== Trial and proceedings ==
=== Initial trial and death sentence ===
On 20 September 2011, Wang Wenfeng stood trial in the High Court for the murder of Yuen Swee Hong, with judge Lee Seiu Kin presiding over the case. The prosecution consisted of Eugene Lee, Lin Yinbing and Ilona Tan, while Wang was represented by defence lawyers Cheong Aik Chye and Chong Thiam Choy.

In Wang's statements to the police and his evidence in court, he did not give a consistent version of the sequence of events in the taxi after the robbery. The prosecution arranged for a similar taxi to be brought to the court premises for Wang to demonstrate the sequence of events, from which the court could assess the range of movement possible in the confined space within the taxi.

The defence submitted that death by natural causes cannot be ruled out. Forensic pathologist Dr Lau had sent the deceased's bone marrow, skeletal muscle and scalp hair for toxicological analysis, which yielded negative results. There were also no records that he had a medical condition that could have caused or contributed to his sudden death. The large amount of blood found in the taxi, convinced Justice Lee that Yuen died due to heavy bleeding from the stab wound(s) caused by Wang, and not due to some other medical condition.

Although it could not be ascertained how many times Wang had stabbed Yuen, Justice Lee found that the number of stab wounds was inconsequential. By pulling that knife towards Yuen against the resistance exerted by him, with the tip of the knife pointing at Yuen's chest, Wang could only have done it to inflict injury, one that was sufficient in the ordinary course of nature to cause death. As such, he found Wang guilty of murder under Section 300(c) of the Penal Code and sentenced him to death.

=== Appeal ===
Wang appealed against his death sentence. His appeal was heard by Chief Justice Chan Sek Keong and Judges of Appeal Andrew Phang and V. K. Rajah.

Wang questioned Justice Lee's findings that Yuen had suffered heavy blood loss, suggesting that the blood could have been diluted with the water he used to wash and clean up the taxi in the car park at Canberra Road. He questioned why Dr Tay did not conduct a Kastle-Meyer test on the stain on the rubber mat on the floor of the taxi to determine whether it was in fact caused by blood. Dr Tay rebutted this argument, stating that the stains on the rubber mat would have looked distinctly different if it had been soaked in a diluted mixture instead of pure blood. Besides, there were also heavy blood stains on other parts of the taxi, which was also evidence of heavy blood loss, and the blood could only have belonged to Yuen from Wang's own admission that Wang himself was not injured.

The defence also argued that Justice Lee had erred by not considering the number of stab wounds inflicted on Yuen, as this was important in determining whether Wang intentionally or accidentally stabbed Yuen; a single stab wound could be accidental while five stab wounds are almost certainly intentional. Wang continued to assert that he had only stabbed the victim once, while Dr Tay's evidence showed that there were five cuts on Yuen's shirt, all of which had clean-cut edges and were consistent with stabs.

On 23 August 2012, Wang's appeal was dismissed by the appeal judges.

== Re-sentencing ==
With new changes to Singapore's death penalty laws in January 2013, Wang was re-tried for Yuen's murder on 7 February 2014. In the re-trial, the prosecution consisted of Bala Reddy, Ilona Tan and Kelly Ho, while Wang was represented by Wendell Wong and Alfian Adam Teo. Justice Lee Seiu Kin, who previously sentenced Wang to death in 2011, presided over the re-trial as well.

DPP Bala Reddy, who led the prosecution, argued in that trial itself that Wang's case deserved the death penalty because Wang had shown a high degree of premeditation and planning in committing the crime. He chose to commit the crime at 4am when it was least likely to be detected. The prosecution examined Wang's post-murder actions and argued he was unremorseful. Particular attention was paid to how Wang robbed Yuen after he killed him, took steps to conceal the murder, attempted to extort money from Yuen's family, prepared to flee from Singapore and, even after arrest, led the police on a wild goose chase and gave several false statements. Hence there should be a deterrence of future crimes committed against public transport workers, especially taxi drivers; and the courts should severely punish those who commit violent, opportunistic and heinous offences.

Wang's defence lawyer Wendell Wong meanwhile, argued for a life term with not more than 10 strokes of the cane. He cited lack of any premeditation to inflict the fatal injuries. What happened was a sudden and unexpected struggle, during which Wang stabbed the victim spontaneously.

Justice Lee found that Wang had not set out with the intention to kill, but with the intention to commit robbery, armed with a knife, and for this reason, re-sentenced Wang to life imprisonment and 24 strokes of the cane.

The prosecution initially filed an appeal against Wang's life imprisonment sentence, however in 2015 the prosecution dropped its appeal, finalising Wang's sentence of life imprisonment and resulting in Wang escaping the gallows.

== Aftermath ==
In 2012, Singaporean crime show Crimewatch re-enacted the murder of Yuen Swee Hong in the seventh episode that year. The episode first aired on 30 September 2012.

In 2013, another crime show In Cold Blood re-enacted the case in the sixth episode of the show's third season.

== See also ==
- List of major crimes in Singapore
- List of cases affected by the Kho Jabing case
- Capital punishment in Singapore
