= Beaulieu House =

Beaulieu House, from the French for "beautiful place", may refer to:

in England

- The Palace of Beaulieu, Boreham, Essex, the surviving north wing of the Tudor structure now part of the Roman Catholic independent New Hall School

in Ireland

- Beaulieu House and Gardens, an early Georgian historic estate in County Louth; open to the public

in Singapore

- Beaulieu House, in Sembawang Park

in the United States of America

- Beaulieu House, Newport, private former home of John Jacob Astor III, Cornelius Vanderbilt III and his wife Grace Vanderbilt

== See also ==
- Beaulieu Palace House, in Hampshire, England
- Beaulieu (disambiguation)
