= Canberra Station =

Canberra Station may refer to:

- Canberra railway station in Kingston, Australian Capital Territory
- Canberra MRT station, a MRT station in Sembawang, Singapore
