= SBPL =

SBPL may refer to:

- Petrolina Airport, Brazil, ICAO airport code
- Sembawang Public Library, a public library in Sembawang, Singapore
