= Ghib Ojisan =

Japanese travel YouTuber based in Singapore

Ghib Ojisan ジブおじさん
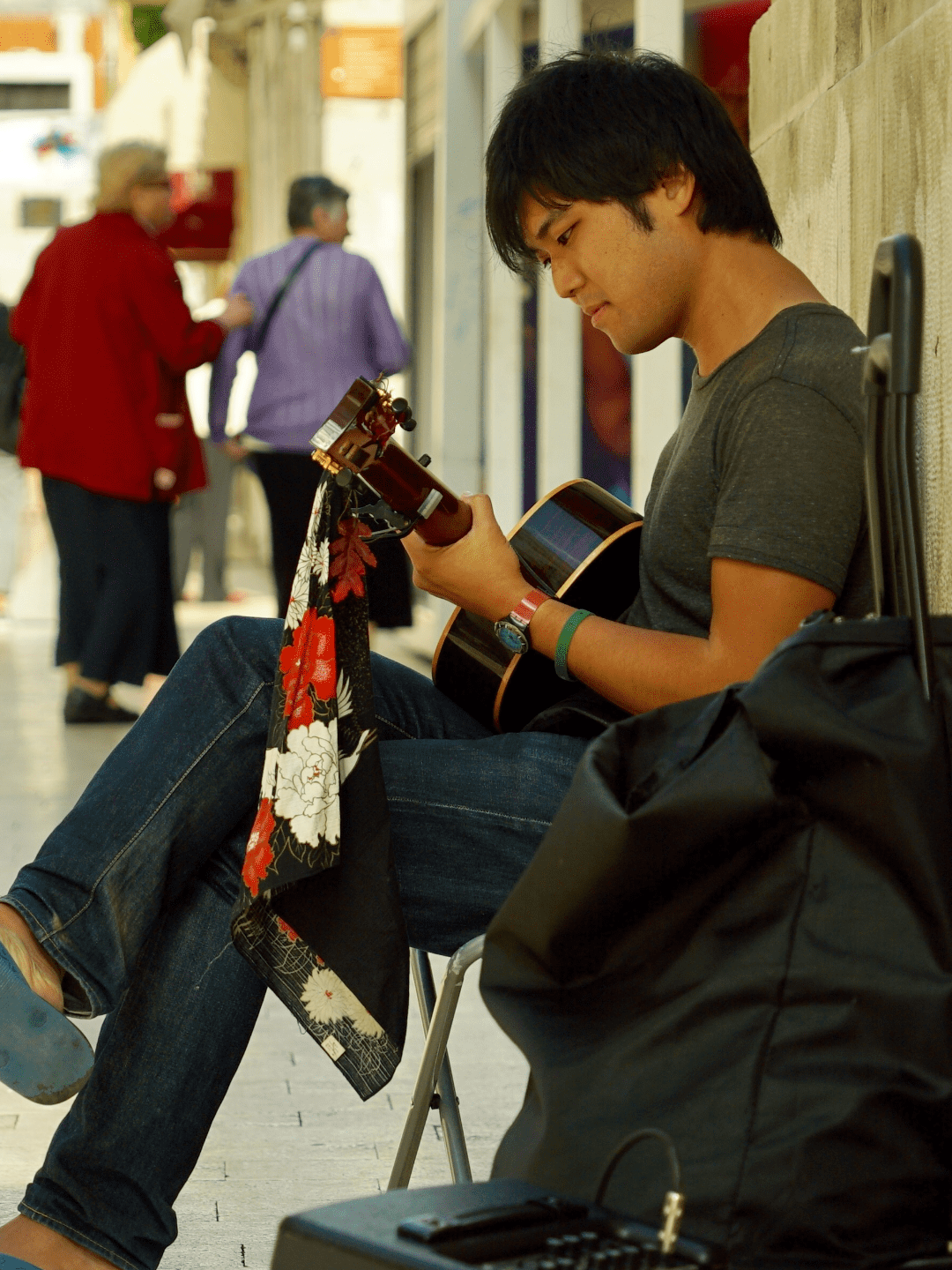
- Ghib Ojisan busking with his guitar in Croatia in 2017
- Born: Ken; 1990 (age 35–36); Osaka Prefecture, Japan
- Years active: 2017–present

YouTube information
- Channels: Ghib Ojisan; The Lost Ojisan
- Genre: Traveling
- Subscribers: 354k (Ghib Ojisan); 48.3k (The Lost Ojisan)
- Views: 106 million (Ghib Ojisan); 10.9 million (The Lost Ojisan)
- Last updated: 12 December 2025

Ken, also known as Ghib Ojisan (ジブおじさん; born in 1990) or Ghibli Ojisan, is a Japanese travel YouTuber based in Singapore. His name, Ghib Ojisan, is a pseudonym for his YouTube channel which he chose because he was inspired by Studio Ghibli's animations.

Born in Osaka Prefecture in Japan, Ghib Ojisan lived in California between the ages of two and 19 as his parents worked in the state. After graduating from Keio University's Faculty of Environment and Information Studies, he had brief stints at a manufacturing company's personnel and sales departments. In 2017, he quit his job with the goal of traveling the world for a year on a budget of ¥1,000,000 (US$6,316). Ghib Ojisan visited 27 countries and busked with his acoustic guitar, videos of which he uploaded to a YouTube channel he created in 2017.

While visiting Singapore, Ghib Ojisan met a Singaporean woman. He later married her and decided to settle in the country. Ghib Ojisan made videos of his experiences living as a Japanese person in Singapore. He made a video about Yishun, which had media coverage indicating it was a dangerous place to live. His video received a large amount of media attention and led to a large increase in YouTube subscribers from outside Japan, which had until then been his primary audience. Ghib Ojisan speaks in Japanese and English in his videos, and includes captions in both languages, with occasional Singlish phrases that contains Mandarin and Malay.

He has mostly made videos over aspects of Singaporean culture and history such as hawker centres, the Sembawang Hot Spring Park, Sentosa and the Japanese occupation of Singapore during World War II. In the midst of the COVID-19 pandemic, Ghib Ojisan's YouTube channel was among the 10 channels with the highest increase in Singaporean subscribers.

== Early life and career ==
Ken, known professionally as Ghibli Ojisan, was born in 1990 in Osaka Prefecture in Japan. Translated from Japanese to English, his name means "Uncle Ghib". When he was a teenager, he really enjoyed the Japanese film Spirited Away and was inspired by Studio Ghibli's animations so chose Ghib Ojisan as his YouTube channel's name. As a fan of the Japanese rock group Bump of Chicken, Ghib Ojisan taught himself how to play the guitar using his brother's guitar.

Ghib Ojisan lived in California between the ages of two and 19 until he finished high school owing to his parents' having jobs in the state. In high school, he participated in soccer and tennis tryouts but did not make the sports teams. His parents enrolled him in Japanese language school, which he begrudgingly attended once a week, allowing him to keep up his Japanese language skills. Ghib Ojisan subsequently attended Keio University in Minato, Tokyo in Japan where he joined a brass band and studied at the university's Faculty of Environment and Information Studies. Upon his college graduation, Ghib Ojisan worked in Japan at a manufacturer in the personnel department, an experience he did not like, so he transferred to a sales role. He worked there until 2017 when he quit his job with the aim of traveling the world for a year on a budget of ¥1,000,000 (US$6,316). Prior to completing his university studies, Ghib Ojisan had not gone traveling but became inspired to after reading the Kotaro Sawaki book Midnight Express about a man who went on bus trip from New Delhi to London. During his one-year stint of backpacking visits to 27 countries, he did street performances with his guitar of video game, anime, and movie song covers and uploaded YouTube videos of those performances. Through his guitar performances, he was able to cover over half of his travel costs.

== YouTube career ==
Ghib Ojisan makes YouTube videos in which he speaks in English and Japanese and includes subtitles in both languages. In addition to his guitar videos, he makes videos sharing his thoughts on Singaporean eateries and discussing where Japan and Singapore are different and the same.

Uploaded in July 2017, Ghib Ojisan's first YouTube video featured him playing the Final Fantasy X theme song "To Zanarkand" on his acoustic guitar in Uzbekistan. At the beginning of 2018, Ghib Ojisan returned to Japan and began uploading to YouTube the videos of his travels. His videos received few views at the beginning but in June 2018, the number of views increased substantially and he was named a YouTube "Creator on the Rise". In two weeks, his subscriber count grew from 100 to 20,000. In December 2018, Ghib Ojisan visited Singapore to make travel videos. He met and married to a Singaporean woman in 2019 and decided to stay in the country. He began working at a Singaporean company but resigned after half a year as he became concerned that he was uploading fewer YouTube videos. He continued to upload videos of guitar covers and began producing content about Singapore. When he transitioned to a channel centered on Singapore's sights and experiences, he initially received pushback from his subscribers who wanted him to post more guitar playing or travel content. Ghib Ojisan initially posted videos in which he visited the Merlion Park, Marina Bay Sands, and Chinatown. The videos received little attention. After he adjusted the focus of his videos to what it is like to live in Singapore, his channel started doing better.

Ghib Ojisan set a goal of making one video every other day. Sengkang was the first place in which he showcased on YouTube the experience of living in Singapore. The Sengkang video increased the number of views and comments by threefold. His video about his Housing and Development Board flat caught the attention of his Japanese watchers, drawing numerous reactions from people wondering why the flat had a bomb shelter. He next made a video about Yishun and hawker centres in which he used a combination of English, Singlish, and Japanese. Ghib Ojisan had reviewed an article that described assaults of police officers with stun guns, murders, and cats being slaughtered, occurring in Yishun, which portrayed it a risky place to live in. In Yishun, he visited a pasar malam which sold fried food and observed stray cats, temples, roast duck rice, and friendly locals. He visited the Yishun MRT station, where he heard the vibrant sounds of cars, people, and pianos. Ghib Ojisan observed 35 surveillance cameras that covered all of the station, which would make it challenging to violate the law without being seen. Ghib Ojisan found a Yishun sign posted by the Singapore Police Force warning that 60 shoplifters had been caught and noted it was the only sign of any crime in the town. Following an uneventful visit, he praised the town for being "home to nice people and cute cats". The video received a large amount of attention online and a large number of people from Malaysia, Singapore, and the United States began watching his videos. As he gained 2,000 subscribers from the video, his Japanese subscribers decreased to 30% of the total subscriber base. Louis Ng and Lee Bee Wah, members of the Parliament of Singapore who were part of the Nee Soon Group Representation Constituency, responded positively to Ghib Ojisan's video. In December 2019, he made a video titled "What did Japan do to Singapore?" about Sook Ching and the Japanese occupation of Singapore during World War II. In January 2020, he filmed his visit to Sembawang Hot Spring Park where he attempted to cook an egg through the spring water. In June 2020, he made a video in People's Park Centre in Chinatown of his getting a "Singapore-style haircut", which means "tightly-tapered sides and back and a neater top". Relying on translations from his phone, he used Mandarin to communicate with the Vietnamese barber who had only basic English-speaking capability.

During the COVID-19 pandemic in Singapore, Singapore implemented "circuit breaker" measures that banned people from meeting in public and at work. Ghib Ojisan uploaded a video titled "Singapore Semi-Lockdown Diary Day 0" on 7 April 2020, depicting crowded supermarkets and customers following social distancing of 1 metre (3.3 ft). Ghib Ojisan, who makes a living from the money generated from the ads YouTube runs on his videos, found a 30% to 40% decline in earnings in the several months before the "circuit breaker" measures. He did not receive any COVID-19 relief funds from Singapore since he works for himself and is a foreign national. Ghib Ojisan's YouTube channel was among the 10 channels that had the highest increase in Singaporean subscribers during the pandemic. During the pandemic, he made a video of his checking up on the health of his Bangladeshi friend, a migrant worker in Singapore whom he had first encountered in 2019. The duo had previously visited a Paya Lebar bazaar and eaten sushi together.

Ghib Ojisan created a second YouTube channel focused on food as he enjoys eating. He started the website Nekkyo Singapore to share with Japanese readers what is like to visit or live in Singapore.

== Personal life ==
Ghib Ojisan travelled to Singapore to make travel videos and met a Singaporean woman. Despite his tight budget and Singapore being a relatively expensive place for a backpacking style of travel, he remained in the country for two months to be with her. In 2019, Ghib Ojisan married the woman and they had two wedding ceremonies, one in Japan and one in Singapore. The couple chose to remain in Singapore. They lived with her parents for two years.

Around September 2020, Ghib Ojisan and his wife purchased a public housing flat with four bedrooms for about S$500,000 (US$447,761). He began learning Mandarin Chinese with the assistance of his mother-in-law and Duolingo. He wanted to be able to converse with the Mandarin-speaking workers at the hawker centres who could not speak English, and he wanted to travel to mainland China and Taiwan to produce vlogs. In 2021, he applied for permanent residency in Singapore, and stated that he is in the midst of eventually taking up Singaporean citizenship; his application for permanent residency was approved in 2022. After having received the COVID-19 vaccine and a booster dose, Ghib Ojisan tested positive for COVID-19 in the days leading up to the 2022 Chinese New Year and quarantined in his home gym for seven days.
