= Sun Plaza, Singapore =

Coordinates: 1°26′54.142″N 103°49′11.329″E

Sun Plaza 太阳广场
- Location: Sembawang, Singapore
- Address: 30 Sembawang Drive, Singapore 757713
- Opened: November 1999; 27 years ago
- Developer: Canberra Development Pte Ltd
- Manager: Koh Brothers Group and Heeton Holdings
- Owner: Koh Brothers Group and Heeton Holdings
- Num. of stores: 91
- Num. of anchor tenants: 4 NTUC Fairprice; Koufu; Hai Di Lao Hotpot; Sembawang Library
- Floor area: 30,100 square metres (324,000 sq ft) (total); 14,700 square metres (158,000 sq ft) (retail)
- Floors: 14 [12 floors (6 retail + 7 residential) + 2 basements]
- Parking: 260 lots
- Public transit: NS11 Sembawang
- Website: Sun Plaza

Sun Plaza (Chinese: 太阳广场) is a mixed-use residential and commercial development located along Sembawang Drive in the heart of Sembawang, Singapore, between Sembawang MRT station and Sembawang Bus Interchange. It is one of the two shopping malls in Sembawang, serving the needs of the local residents.

== History ==
Sun Plaza was developed as a joint venture between Koh Brothers and Heeton Holdings and was completed in November 1999. Like other suburban malls at that time, it had an Eng Wah cinema, an NTUC FairPrice supermarket, the Sembawang Library, the local post office, a Kopitiam food court and 93 specialty shops. Above Sun Plaza are two seven-storey tower blocks composed of 76 residential apartments, which were completed in 2001.

In January 2009, the cinema was closed due to expiry of lease and was left vacant. The mall also suffered declining patronage too, due to competitions from Causeway Point, Northpoint, the then newly reopened Sembawang Shopping Centre, and a lack of well known anchor tenants. As a result, some tenants started moving out, such as Popular bookstore being replaced by Gain City.

The mall underwent major refurbishment works in 2014, when it was reclad with a new yellow exterior facade and a change in interior layout, as well as installation of an outdoor escalator. The vacant cinema premises was converted to educational use, with Level 4 housing a bunch of tuition and enrichment centres and the entirety of Level 5 housing the new Sembawang Public Library, having relocated from its original premises at Level 3. Basement 1 was reconfigured to include more food and beverage options. The post office was relocated to the nearby Sembawang HDB branch office. Kopitiam was relocated to the other end of its original premises at Level 3 and the atrium was relocated to Level 2. The mall reopened in August 2015 with a net increased lettable area of 5772 sq ft and 103 speciality shops. In 2018, Hai Di Lao Hotpot opened in the mall, taking over the space vacated by children's department store Tom & Stefanie. In May 2021, Koufu opened in the mall, taking over the food court space formerly occupied by Kopitiam, which ceased operations in November 2020.
