= Sembawang Library =

Public library in Singapore

Coordinates: 1°26′54.142″N 103°49′11.329″E

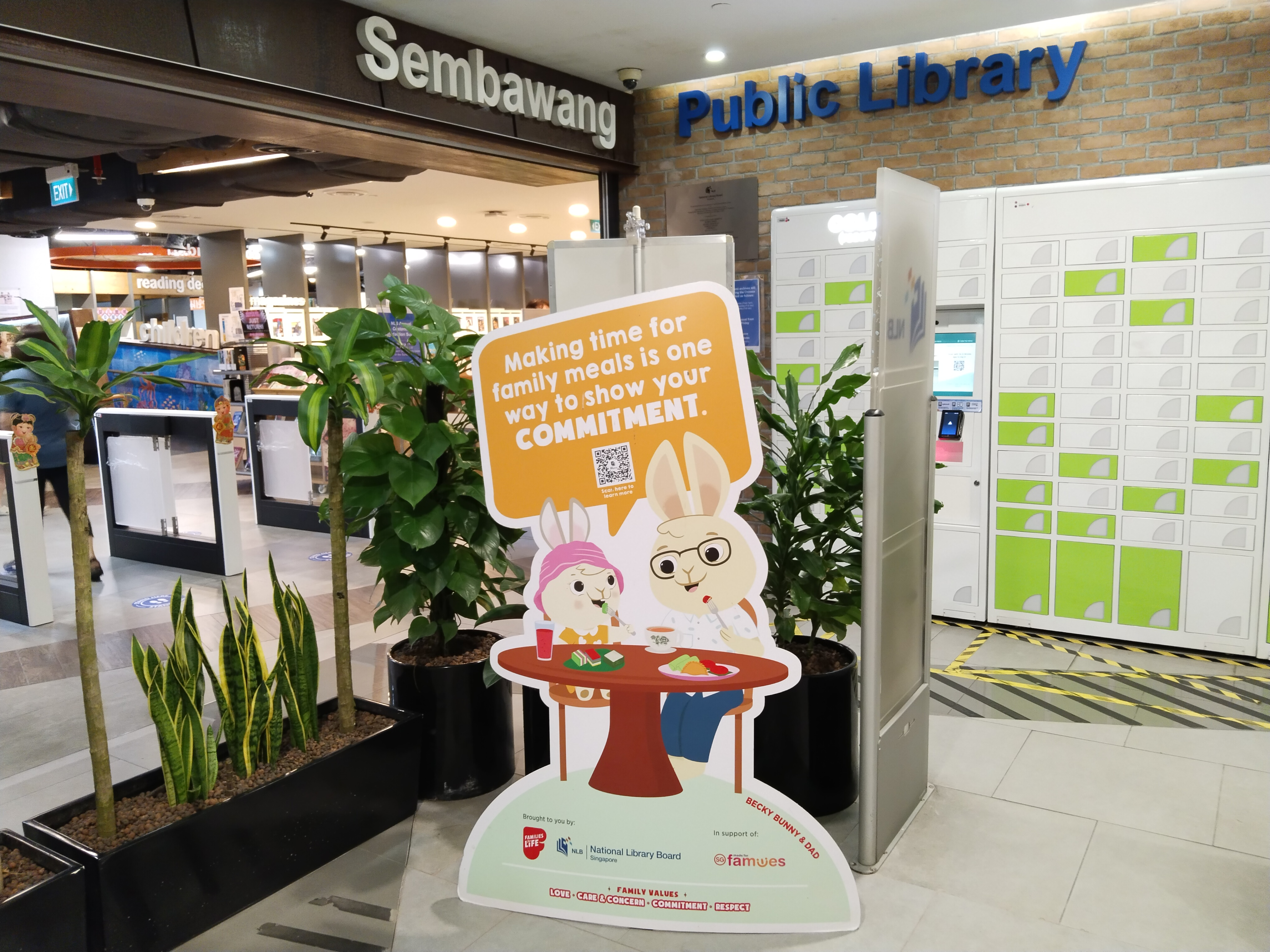
- Sembawang Library in January 2025
- Location: 30 Sembawang Drive, #05-01, Sun Plaza, Singapore 757713, Singapore
- Type: Public library
- Established: 11 August 2000; 25 years ago
- Branch of: National Library Board

Collection
- Size: 150,000

Sembawang Library is a public library located in Sun Plaza shopping mall at Sembawang, Singapore. It was officially opened on 11 August 2000 by K. Shanmugam, Minister of Parliament for Sembawang Group Representation Constituency. The library relocated to Level 5 of Sun Plaza Shopping Mall, and was reopened on 5 November 2014 by Associate Professor Muhammad Faishal Ibrahim, Parliamentary Secretary, Ministry of Health & Ministry of Transport.

The library occupies the entire fifth storey with a floor area of 1,607 square metres. It serves residents in the North West areas of Lim Chu Kang, Mandai, Sembawang, Simpang, Sungei Kadut, Woodlands and Yishun, and has a wide-ranging collection size of 150,000 for users of all age groups.

== Access ==
The library is served by the Sembawang MRT station and Sembawang Bus Interchange near Sun Plaza shopping mall.

== See also ==
- List of libraries in Singapore
