= City of Canberra =

City of Canberra may refer to:

- Canberra, the capital city of Australia
- City of Canberra, a Boeing 707 formerly operated by Qantas on display at the Qantas Founders Museum in Longreach, Queensland
- City of Canberra (aircraft), a Boeing 747-400 formerly operated by Qantas on display at the Historical Aircraft Restoration Society museum at Illawarra Regional Airport, New South Wales
- Civic, Australian Capital Territory, the central business district of Canberra
- No. 28 Squadron RAAF, a squadron of the Royal Australian Air Force Reserve also known as No. 28 "City of Canberra" Squadron
