= Sungei Simpang Kiri =

River in Singapore

Coordinates: 1°27′32″N 103°50′42″E

Sungei Simpang Kiri (Note: IPA: /ˈsʊŋaɪ ˈsɪmpɑːŋ ˈkɪri/ SUUNG-eye SIM-pahng KIH-ree) is a river located in eastern part of Sembawang, Singapore. The river starts near Canberra Link and discharges into the Straits of Johor.

== Location ==
Sungei Simpang Kiri is a river located in eastern part of Sembawang. The river starts at the intersection where Yishun Avenue 2 and Canberra Link and ends at People's Association Water Venture (Sembawang). It discharges into the Straits of Johore. The river is named after the maritime Suku Seletar tribe who used to live along the river banks.

== History ==
In 1970, the river banks were used extensively for rubber plantations and mangrove swamps surrounded the river. There were also villages close to the river. After urban development, the river was straightened and turned into a concrete canal. A 3 km (1.9 mi) linear park was also constructed to run across the river banks. A section of the river, known as Sungei Simpang Kanan, is slated to undergo another redevelopment under the Public Utilities Board Active, Beautiful, Clean (ABC) program and the redevelopment is expected to end in 2019.

== Ecology ==
The river is home to apple snails as well as horseshoe crabs. Species of birds such as egrets and kingfishers can be found on the river banks. The secondary forests at the estuary of the river constitute the habitat of species such as Coelognathus flavolineatus.
