= Sembawang Bus Interchange =

Bus interchange in Sembawang, Singapore

Sembawang Bus Interchange 三巴旺巴士转换站 Pusat Pertukaran Bas Sembawang
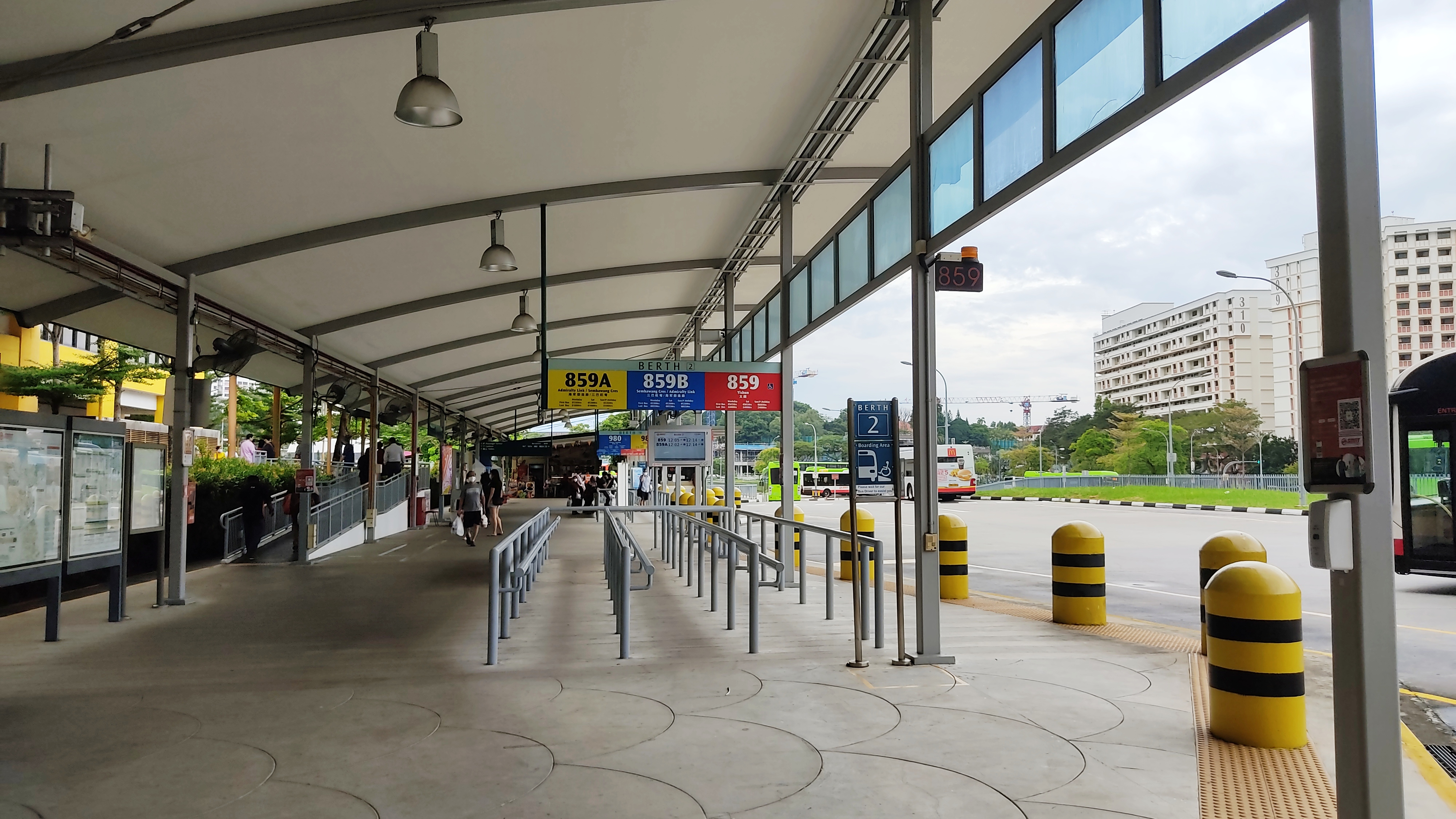
- Sembawang Bus Interchange.

General information
- Location: 11A Sembawang Vista, Singapore 757527
- System: Public Bus Interchange
- Owner: Land Transport Authority
- Operator: Tower Transit Singapore Pte Ltd (Transit Systems)
- Bus routes: 10 (Tower Transit); 2 (SBS Transit)
- Bus stands: 3 Boarding Berths; 2 Alighting Berths
- Bus operators: Tower Transit Singapore Pte Ltd; SBS Transit Ltd
- Connections: NS11 Sembawang

Construction
- Structure type: At-grade
- Accessible: Accessible alighting/boarding points Accessible public toilets Graduated kerb edges Tactile guidance system

History
- Opened: 20 November 2005; 20 years ago

Key dates
- 20 November 2005: Commenced operations

Sembawang Bus Interchange is a bus interchange located in Sembawang, Singapore. Opened on 20 November 2005, it provides hassle-free transfer to the nearby Sembawang MRT station.

This is one of the interchanges in a residential estate to not have any feeder services.

== History ==
Before the opening of Sembawang Bus Interchange, various bus services terminated at scattered parts of Sembawang town. These include Admiralty Road West Bus Terminal for Service 980, Sembawang Road End Bus Terminal (near Sembawang Park) for Service 167 and the pair of bus stops outside Sembawang MRT station for Service 981.

When Sembawang bus interchange opened, these bus services, along with Service 859, which operates from Yishun Bus Interchange, were amended to terminate at the newly opened bus interchange.

Bus Service 882 was introduced to replace the lost link between Sembawang and Sembawang Park along Sembawang Road End (via Wellington Circle and Montreal Link). The link by former services to the former Admiralty Road West Bus Terminal from Sembawang were covered by Service 856 and Service 981. Service 856 passes by both places along its route between Yishun Bus Interchange and Woodlands Bus Interchange, while Service 981 passes by both place on its route to Senoko Industrial Estate.

Since then, due to the Bus Service Enhancement Programme Singapore (BSEP), four new bus services were introduced to Sembawang: Service 859A & 859B in 2014 as supplementary services, Service 117 to Punggol in 2015 and Service 883 to loop at Yishun Central 2 in 2016. Service 883M was introduced in 2020, looping at Yishun Avenue 5 to supplement Service 883, while Service 117M was introduced in 2021. Services 117M & 883M were not introduced under the BSEP. Service 167 was degraded several times since COVID-19 pandemic, with the frequency dropping to 30 minute intervals on 17 December 2023.

On 15 September 2024, Bus service 861 was introduced, looping at Khatib MRT station, connecting Canberra with Yishun East & Khatib. This is the first bus service introduced under the Bus Connectivity Enhancement Programme (BCEP), which was launched by the LTA on 30 July 2024.

== Management ==
Since 3 October 2021, Sembawang Bus Interchange is managed by Tower Transit on a five year term.

== Bus contracting model ==
Under the bus contracting model, all bus services operating from Sembawang Bus Interchange were divided into two bus packages, operated by two bus operators.

=== List of bus services ===
Operator	Package	Routes
SBS Transit	Sengkang-Hougang	117, 117M
Tower Transit Singapore	Sembawang-Yishun	167, 859, 859A, 859B, 861, 861A, 861C, 861M, 882, 882A, 883, 883M, 980, 981
