= Sembawang Park =

Park in Singapore

Coordinates: 1°27′39.77″N 103°50′11.48″E

Sembawang Park (Chinese: 三巴旺公园; Malay: Taman Sembawang) is a 15-hectare park situated in Sembawang, in the north of Singapore facing the Straits of Johor overlooking Malaysia. It is located at the end of Sembawang Road, where the former Sembawang Road End Bus Terminal was.

== History ==
Sembawang Park got its name from the Sembawang Tree (Malay for Mesua Ferruginea). There is one Sembawang tree at the centre of the car park C1 close to the Sembawang Bus terminal. The Sembawang park has many interesting connections to Singapore's historical past. The pathways inside the park are old roads, that have recently been repaved with asphalt.

=== Singapore Naval Base ===
Located on the west of the park is the Sembawang Shipyard, which was His Majesty's Naval Base (HM Naval Base) of the British Royal Navy from the 1920s until Singapore's independence. The busy and geographically advantaged port in Singapore and the urgent need for a naval base made the British decide to establish a Naval Base in Singapore. In 1923, the construction of Naval Base began in Sembawang and was completed in 1938. In between it slowed due to the Naval Disarmament Treaty. The fully operational Naval Base was opened by Sir Shenton Thomas, the then Singapore Governor on 14 February 1938; it was the largest Dockyard outside the British Naval Base. The battleship HMS Prince of Wales and the battlecruiser HMS Repulse with four destroyers forming the "Z" force landed in Singapore's Naval Base on 2 December 1941. Following the Pearl Harbor attack, the Japanese also bought Johore coastlines just opposite the Naval Base and attacked the two warships unexpectedly. The two warships sank on 10 December 1941, in whose memory a Sembawang Memorial was unveiled in Sembawang wharves in 2005.

The Dockyard was closed down in January 1942 realising that Japanese could use the Naval Base. The British surrendered to Japanese on 15 February 1942, whose details could be found much more from Memories at Old Ford Factory museum where the surrender was signed. For the following three years, until 1945, the Japanese used the naval base to service and repair their navy ships. On 6 September 1945, the Japanese surrendered to the British in Sembawang fleet shore accommodation, now called HMS Terror. From 1968, the naval base was converted and came to use as Sembawang Shipyard. The attacks and operations of the Naval Base at Sembawang are closely connected to the Jetty, Pier and accommodation at the Sembawang Park itself.

== Attractions ==
=== Sembawang Jetty ===
In the 1940s, the British started building a 30m long jetty, and later abandoned it during the Japanese occupation. The Japanese completed the construction of the jetty. The private jetty stands in complete shape only from the efforts of these once warring colonial forces. Now, it is a popular fishing ground.

=== Seletar Pier ===
Seletar Pier was used for transport of construction materials during Naval Base construction in the early 1920s. On 20 January 1942, the pier was bombed by Japanese, and only the remains of the Seletar pier stands at the end of Sembawang Road.

=== Sembawang Beach ===
Sembawang Beach is one of the few natural sandy beaches remaining in Singapore. The other natural sandy beach is Changi. The Labrador Beach is also natural but rocky.

In January 2025, Sembawang Beach was graded as fair and the public is advised against exposing their whole face or body to the water but other water activities were allowed to be carried out. IN January 2026, it was given a good rating and all water activities were allowed.

=== The Beaulieu House ===
The Beaulieu House is a house built in the 1910s, as a seaside house for a David family. When the Sembawang Naval Base construction began in 1923, the British took over the house. It served as a residence for the senior engineers during construction, and during operation of the Naval Base, the senior officers resided at the Beaulieu House. Admiral Layton, the most senior Naval Officer in Singapore lived in this house for the periods of two years from 1940 to 1942. He also hosted tennis parties near the house. After the war, it served as residence of Senior Fleet Officers like the Chief of Staff, who return the salute at the Sembawang Jetty right in front of the house. Now, the house is gazetted as a Conservation Area by the Urban Redevelopment Authority. It houses a seaside restaurant and venue for weddings and parties.

== Renovations ==
In 2011, the National Parks Board had started its renovations on parts of Sembawang Park, including the beach, the barbecue pits, the jetty and a playground which was located near the car park. In July 2011 onwards, the barbecue pits are closed for booking. The jetty was closed from 21 May 2012, for improvement works and was reopened on 7 June 2012. The date of completion is unknown.

== Surrounding areas of interest ==
The Sembawang Park and its surrounding areas are surrounded by sites where there was the Kampong Wak Hassan, with old Malay Kampong houses and many roads with old black and white colonial houses. There are around 20 roads which are named after the British colonies like Delhi Road, Pakistan Road, Kenya Crescent, Madras Road, Africa Road and so on.

The Navy museum preserves a collection of Singapore's navy and also the Royal Navy. The museum contains historical exhibits of the Naval Base, photographs, badges, medals, documents and nautical objects.

The Andrew Avenue just west to the Sembawang Road traces a calm secluded road to Bottle Tree Village. On the way is a mosque named Melayu Perempatan Masjid built in the 1970s, surrounded by remnants of air raid shelters and lush secondary vegetation.

Remnants of air raid shelters could also be found in Maltat Crescent.

The Old Admiralty House, one of 52 national monuments of Singapore, is present 3.5 km from the park in Old Nelson Road. The 'arts and crafts' style building designed by Sir Edwin Lutyens is now a spa resort known as the Admiral Hill Country Club.

The Sembawang Memorial at the Sembawang wharfs was opened in 2005 to commemorate the 60th anniversary of the end of World War II and in memory of the brave men of the two HMS war cruisers which sunk during the Japanese attack in 1941.

== Fauna and flora ==
There are more than 40 bird species recorded in this area by the Nature Society of Singapore. The cannonball tree is an attraction in the park, though non native. The fruits are woody and large reminding of cannonballs in size and weight.

== Getting there ==
The closest MRT station is Sembawang MRT station. Prior to the opening of Sembawang Bus Interchange in 2005, bus service 167 used to call at the former Sembawang Road End Terminal. It is also served by bus service number 882.

== See also ==
- List of parks in Singapore
- National Parks Board
