= Sembawang Shopping Centre =

Shopping center in Sembawang, Singapore

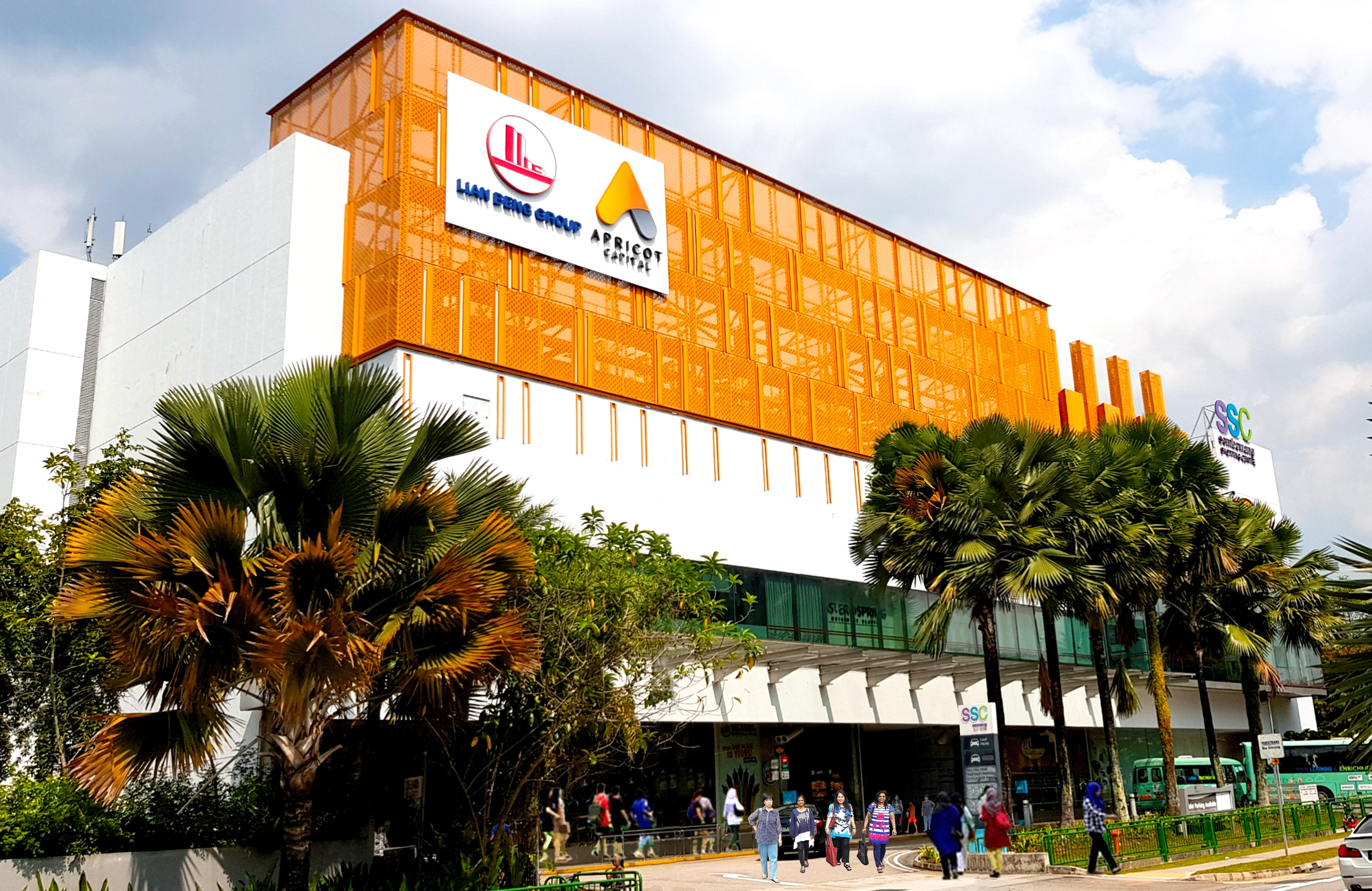
- Location: Sembawang, Singapore
- Address: 604 Sembawang Road, Singapore 758459
- Opened: 1986; 40 years ago (original); December 2008; 17 years ago (refurbished)
- Developer: CapitaLand Mall Trust
- Manager: Knight Frank
- Owner: Lian Beng-Apricot Sembawang
- Architect: DCA Archietects
- Num. of anchor tenants: 4
- Floor area: 197,676 square feet (18,364.7 m^{2}) (total); 134,534.99 square feet (12,498.710 m^{2}) (retail)
- Floors: 3 with 1 basement (1 retail basement)
- Parking: 165 lots
- Public transit: 167, 856, 858/858A, 859, 980
- Website: www.sembawangsc.com.sg

Sembawang Shopping Centre is a four-storey commercial development located along Sembawang Road in Sembawang Spring Estate of Sembawang, Singapore. It was first opened in 1986 and underwent a refurbishment in 2007 and reopened in December 2008. In April 2018, the Centre was sold to Lian Beng-Apricot Sembawang.

== History ==
Sembawang Shopping Centre was developed by CapitaLand Mall Trust on a freehold land. It consists of four retail stories (including one basement). It has a total floor area of 197,676 square feet (18,364.7 m^{2}), of which 134,534.99 square feet (12,498.710 m^{2}) are used for commercial purposes.

The mall underwent a refurbishment in 2007 and reopened in December 2008. The architectural firm involved in the redesigning of the mall is DCA Architects.

In April 2018, with Colliers International as the estate agent, the Centre was sold to a joint venture of Lian Beng Group and Apricot Capital (Lian Beng-Apricot Sembawang) in an attempt to diversify the portfolio of CapitaLand Mall Trust. The shopping centre was sold for $$248 million, which was double the valuation of the mall at that time. After the purchase, Knight Frank Property Asset Management Pte Ltd is the managing agent for the mall.

== Locality ==
The shopping mall is a landmark along Sembawang Road, and is located within the vicinity of landed Sembawang Spring Estate.

== Awards ==
Year	Award	Awarding agency	Ref.
2009	BCA Green Mark Gold Award (Category: Buildings)	Building & Construction Authority of Singapore (BCA)	
