= Kayea ferruginea =

Conservation status
- Least Concern (IUCN 3.1)

Scientific classification
- Kingdom: Plantae
- Clade: Tracheophytes
- Clade: Angiosperms
- Clade: Eudicots
- Clade: Rosids
- Order: Malpighiales
- Family: Calophyllaceae
- Genus: Kayea
- Species: K. ferruginea

Binomial name
- Kayea ferruginea Pierre

Synonyms
- Kayea acuminatissima Merr.; Kayea macrocarpa Pierre; Mesua acuminatissima (Merr.) Kosterm.; Mesua ferruginea (Pierre) Kosterm.; Mesua macrocarpa (Pierre) Kosterm.

Species of flowering plant

Kayea ferruginea is a species of flowering plant belonging to Calophyllaceae family. It is a free native to southern Indochina (Cambodia, Thailand, and Vietnam), Peninsular Malaysia, Singapore, and Borneo. It grows in lowland tropical moist forests, typically along streams at low elevations.

The local or common name has been said to be Sembawang tree in a paper. Thus, giving the area of Sembawang its name.

It grows 8 to 12 metres tall. The fruits are 6 cm across, enveloped in four loose leathery fleshy sepals. Flowers found in short, axillary panicles and leaves are elliptic of 8 x 3 to 12 x 4.5 cm size.

In Peninsular Malaysia the species has been recorded in Eastern Johore, Sungei Endau southwards, Pahang, Ayer Etam, Kelantan, Temangan.

The species was described by Jean Baptiste Louis Pierre in 1885.
