= Sembawang MRT station =

Mass Rapid Transit station in Singapore

Sembawang NS11 三巴旺 செம்பாவாங்
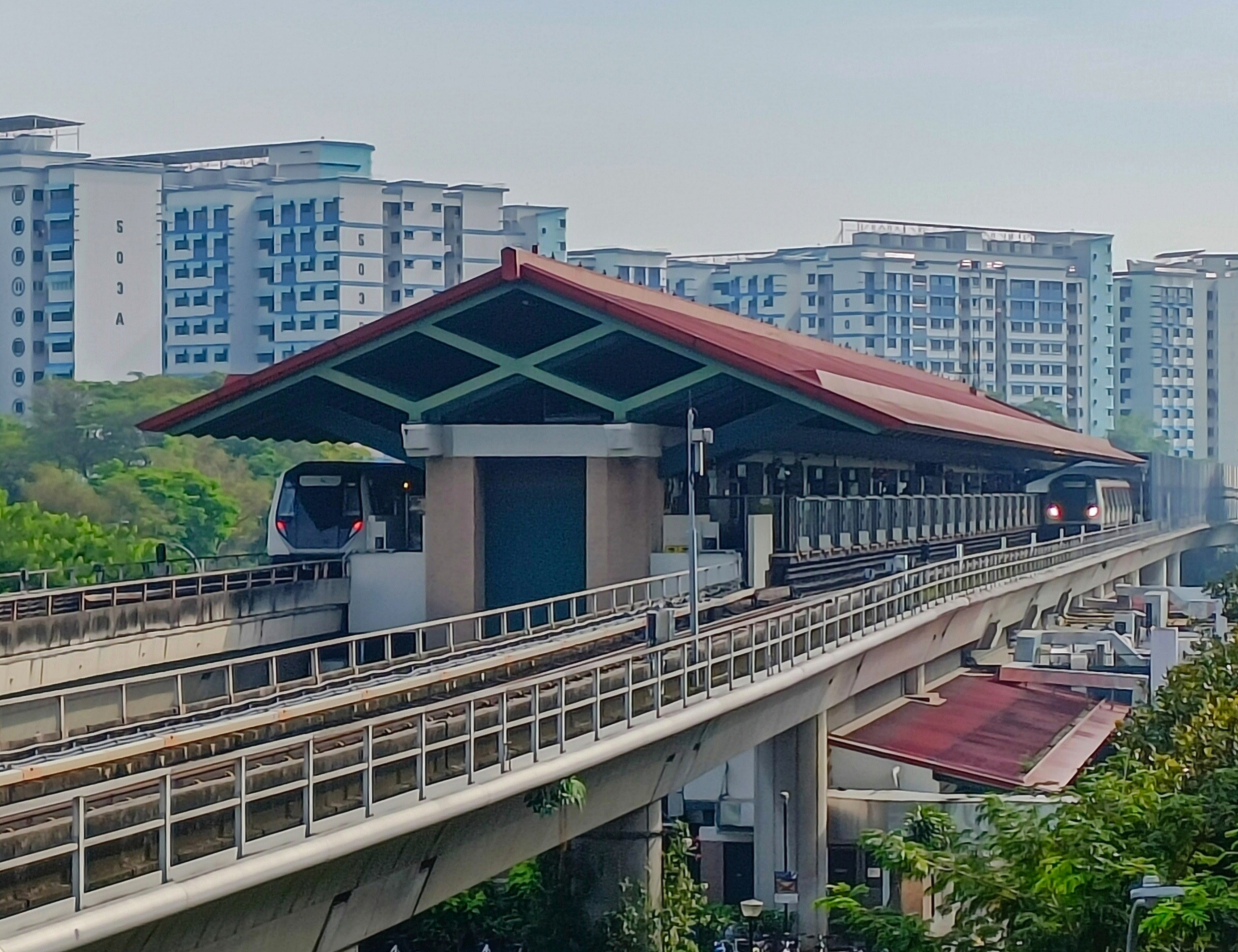
- Exterior of Sembawang MRT station

General information
- Location: 11 Canberra Road, Singapore 759775
- Coordinates: 01°26′56.49″N 103°49′12.55″E
- System: Mass Rapid Transit (MRT) station
- Owner: Land Transport Authority
- Operator: SMRT Trains
- Line: North–South Line
- Platforms: 2 (1 island platform)
- Tracks: 2
- Connections: Sembawang, Taxi

Construction
- Structure type: Elevated
- Platform levels: 1
- Parking: Yes
- Cycle facilities: Yes
- Accessible: Yes

Other information
- Station code: SBW

History
- Opened: 10 February 1996; 30 years ago

Passengers
- March 2021: 31,026 per day

Services
Preceding station	Mass Rapid Transit	Following station
Admiralty towards Jurong East	North–South Line	Canberra towards Marina South Pier
Track layout
Location
- Location within Singapore Rail

Sembawang MRT station is an elevated Mass Rapid Transit (MRT) station on the North–South Line (NSL). Located in Sembawang, Singapore along Sembawang Road, the station is close to the Sun Plaza shopping centre and Sembawang Bus Interchange. The station is operated by SMRT Trains.

Originally planned to be built later than the other stations of the Woodlands extension, the station's construction was brought forward when plans were revised in November 1992. Completed along with the other Woodlands extension stations on 10 February 1996, Sembawang station has the most number of bicycle stands for cyclists working at Sembawang Shipyard. The number of bicycle parking spaces further increased through the National Cycling Plan in 2010. The station features a kampung-style roof and is also integrated with other transportation modes.

== History ==
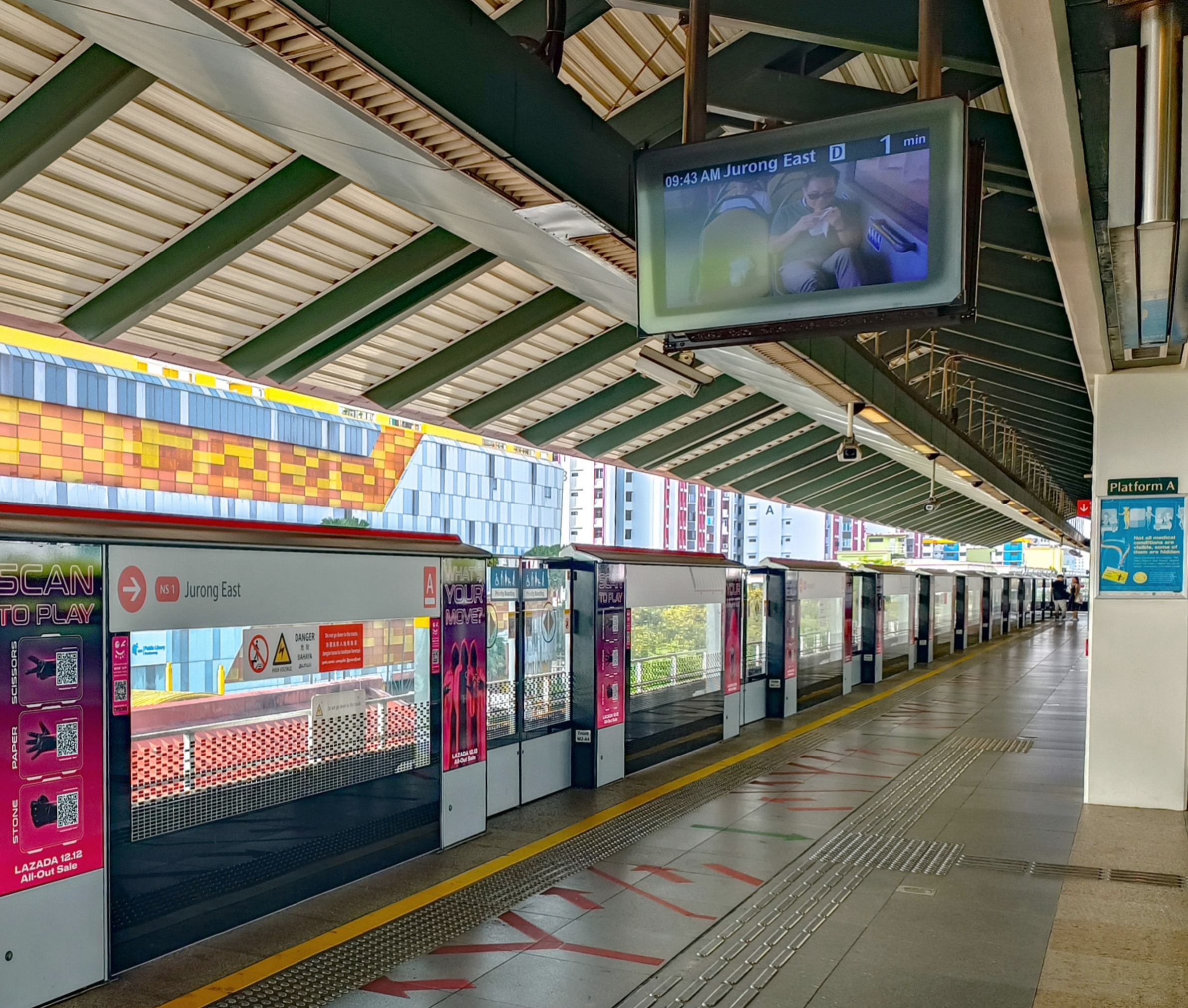
Platform of the station

After the Branch line (from the Jurong East to Choa Chu Kang stations) opened in 1990, the Woodlands MRT line was envisioned so as to connect between Yishun and Choa Chu Kang stations. The station was among the six Woodlands line extension stations announced in November 1991. In June 1991, the station's location was moved south from its original location so as to minimise destruction to the Senoko Bird sanctuary. It was initially planned to build the station at a later stage along with the Kadut station.

In November 1992, however, the station's construction was brought forward to serve more residents moving into the Woodlands area. The contract for the construction of Sembawang station, along with the Marsiling, Admiralty and Woodlands stations and 8.7 kilometres (5.4 miles) of track work, was awarded to a joint venture between Hyundai Engineering and Koon Construction and Transport Co in December 1992 at a contract sum of S$233.1 million (US$143.1 million). During the construction, a section of Canberra Road had to be temporarily closed from 4 to 6 May 1994 to install the construction beam between the Sembawang and Yishun stations.

Then-communications minister Mah Bow Tan made a few visits to the station site, first in May 1993 and on 13 January 1996. The station opened on 10 February 1996 along with the other stations on the Woodlands Extension.

Sembawang station was part of the first batch of ten stations to have additional bicycle parking facilities (Note: The other stations are: Admiralty, Aljunied, Boon Lay, Chinese Garden, Khatib, Lakeside, Sengkang, Simei and Yishun.) under the National Cycling Plan announced in 2010. In 2012, half-height platform screen doors were installed at this station as part of the Land Transport Authority's (LTA) programme to improve safety in MRT stations. Between 2012 and 2013, high-volume low-speed fans were installed at this station to improve ventilation at the elevated station's platforms. To facilitate the construction of the 72-metre-long (236 ft) long rail crossover track between this station and the new infill station Canberra, Sembawang station was closed from 18 to 20 May 2019.

== Details ==
Sembawang station serves the North–South Line (NSL) and is situated between the Admiralty and Canberra stations. The official station code is NS11. When it opened, it had the station code of N14 before being changed to its current station code in August 2001 as a part of a system-wide campaign to cater to the expanding MRT System. As part of the NSL, the station is operated by SMRT Trains. Located along Sembawang Way, the station serves the Singapore neighbourhood of Sembawang. The station is situated north of the Sun Plaza retail mall and Sembawang Bus Interchange and serves various public amenities such as Sembawang Neighbourhood Police Centre and Jelutong Community Club, as well as surrounding educational institutions such as Sembawang Primary School and Sembawang Secondary School.

Like most stations on the Woodlands Extension, it has a kampung-style roof. The station, with more commercial spaces at 1,489 m^{2} (16,030 sq ft), has shops located at one side of the station concourse to serve the residents in the area. The station is integrated with other transportation modes, with longer sheltered bus bays of 36 m (118 ft) that can accommodate up to three buses alongside taxi stands. To address the higher demand by Sembawang Shipyard workers cycling to work, Sembawang station features more than 350 bicycle stands – the most among the Woodlands Extension stations.
