= Sembawang =

Town in North Region, Singapore

- Planning Area and Town

Other transcription(s)
  - Malay: Sembawang (Rumi) سمباوڠ (Jawi)
  - Chinese: 三巴旺; Sānbāwàng (Pinyin); Sam-pa-ōng (Hokkien POJ)
  - Tamil: செம்பவாங் Cempavāṅ (Transliteration)
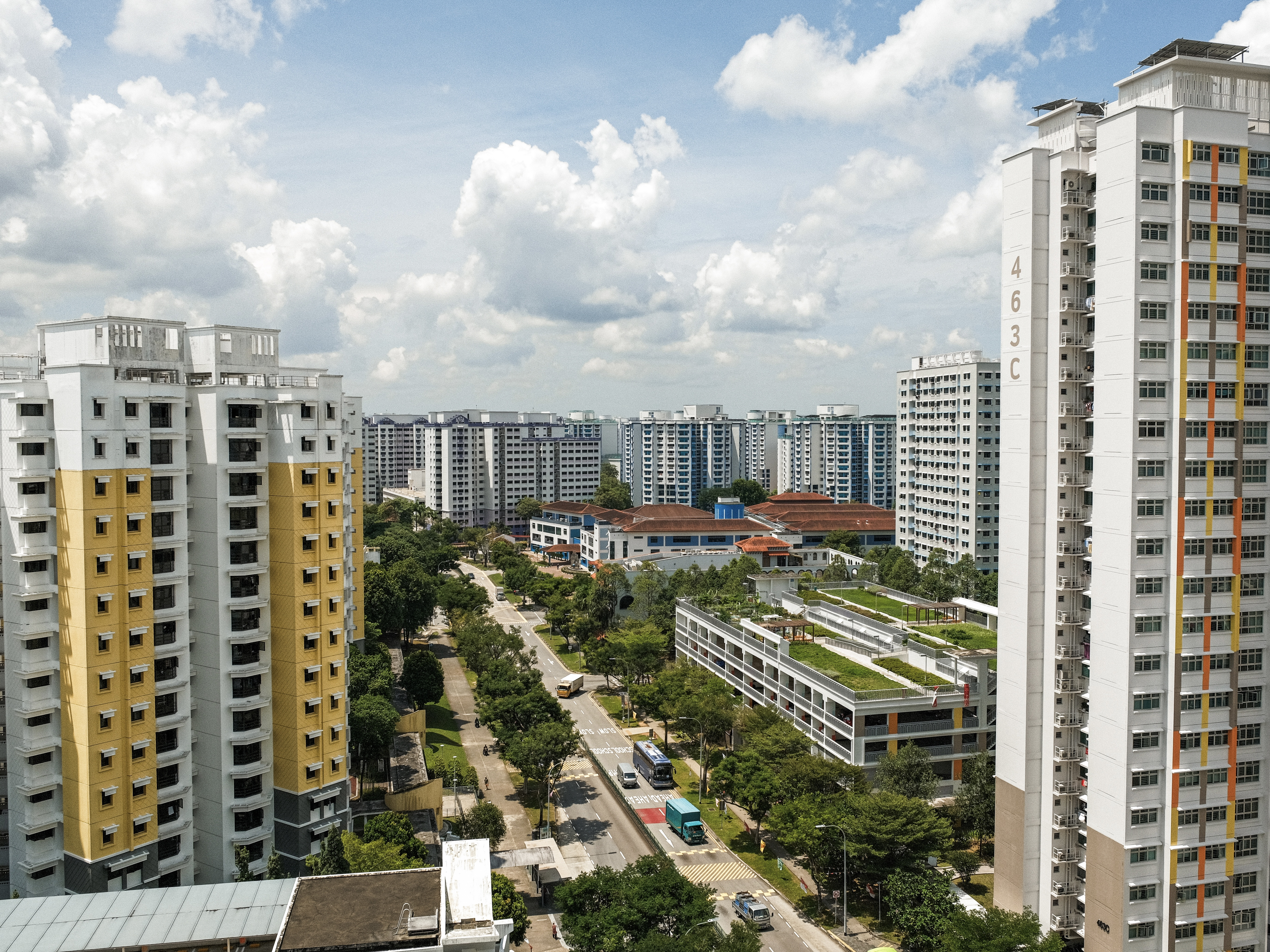
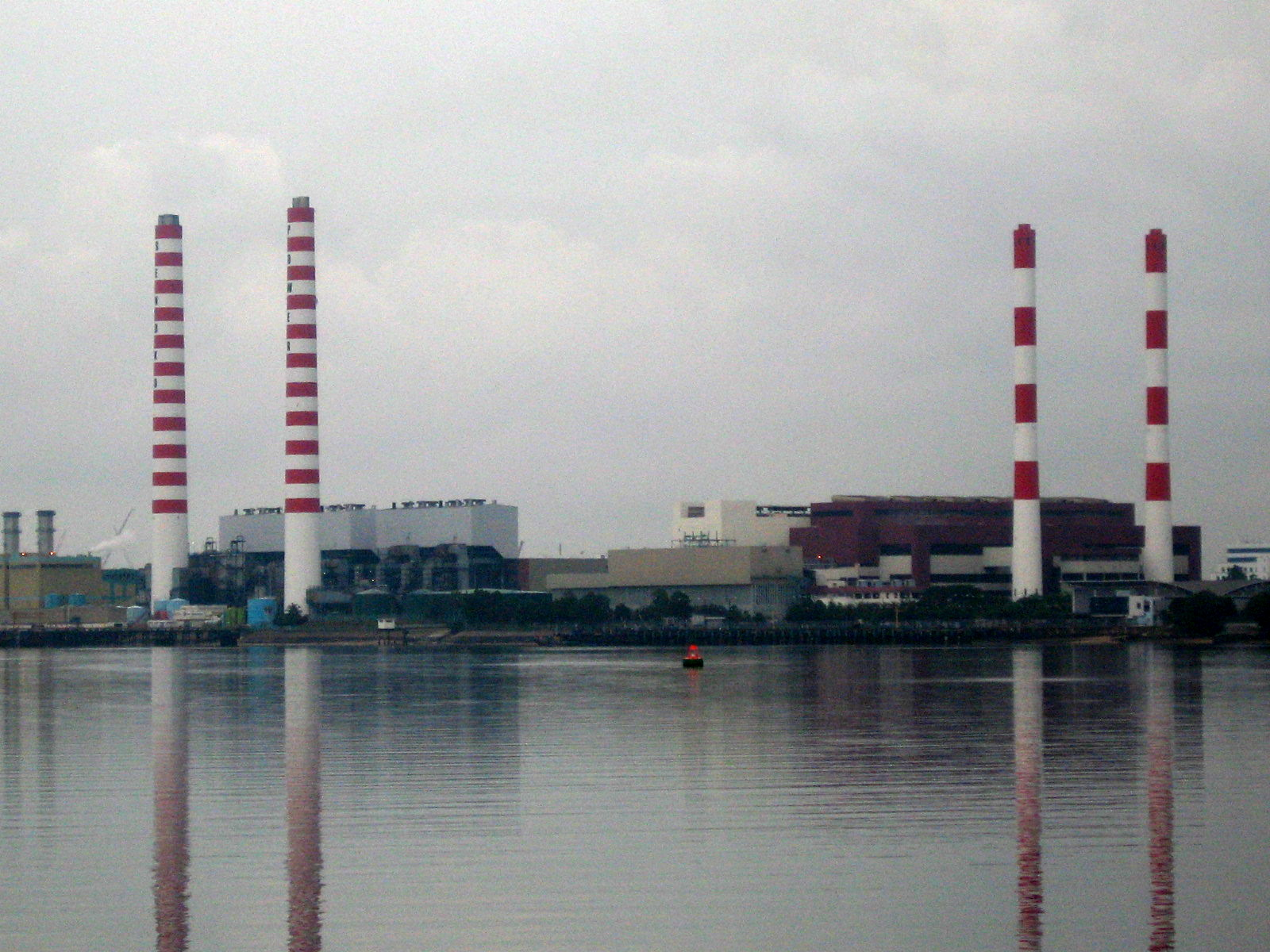
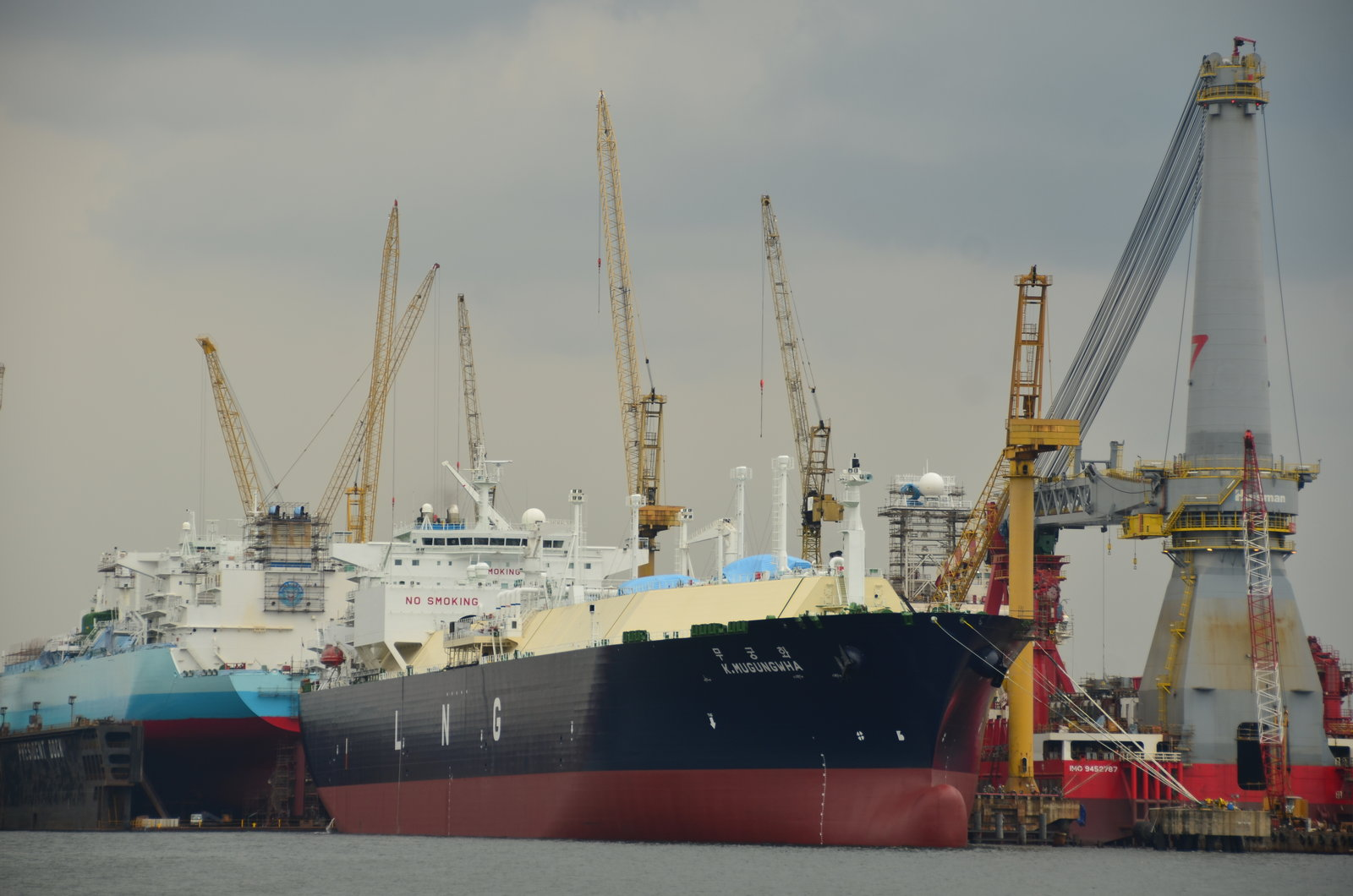
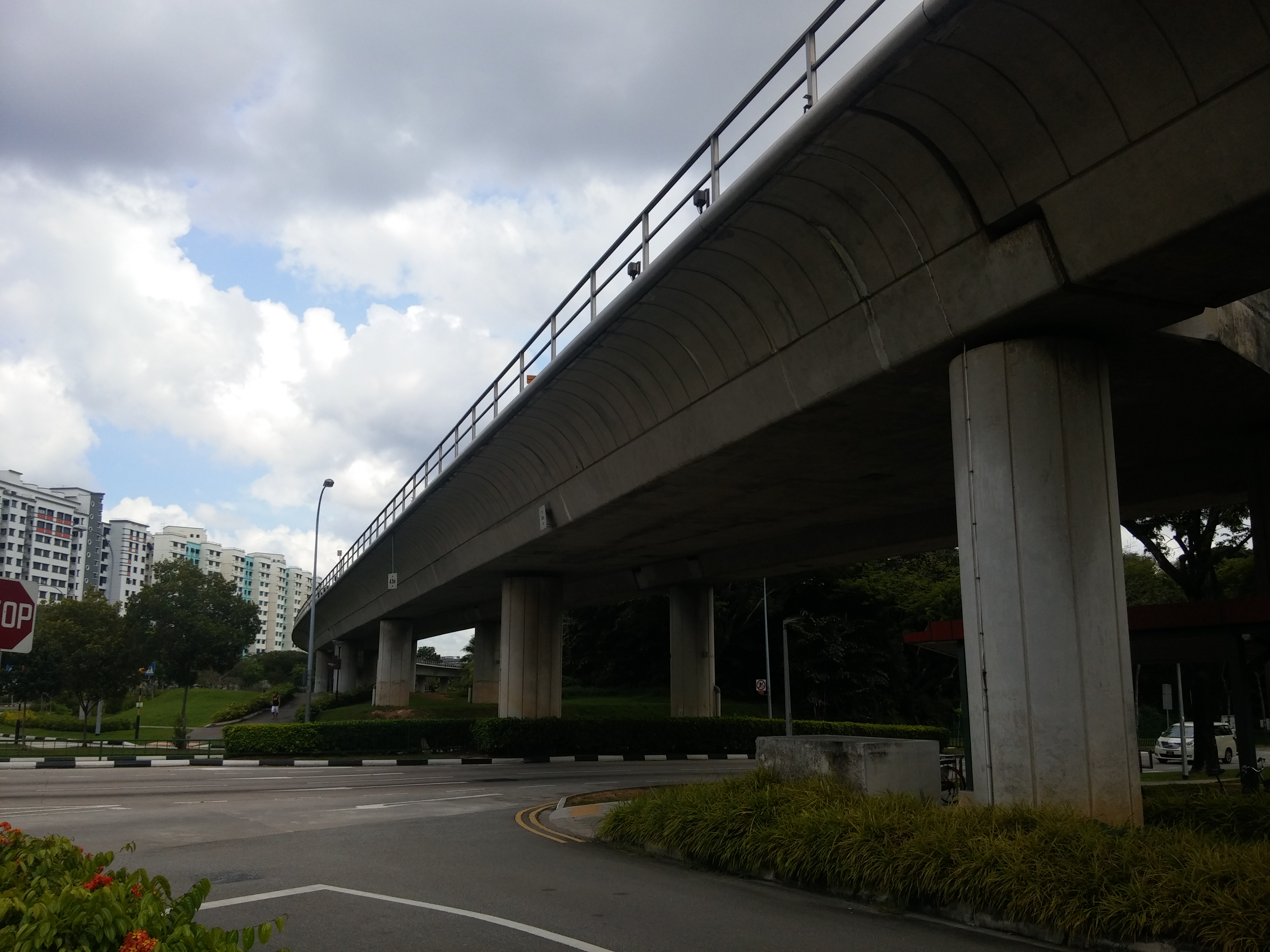
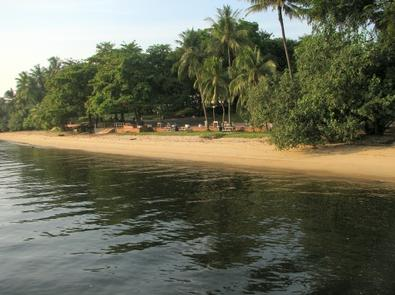
- From top left to right: HDB flats along Sembawang Drive, Senoko Power Station, Sembawang Shipyard, MRT viaduct in Sembawang, Wak Hassan Beach

- Location of Sembawang in Singapore

- Location of Sembawang within Singapore
- Coordinates: 1°26′56.8″N 103°49′6.58″E
- Country: Singapore
- Region: North Region
- CDC: North West CDC
- Town councils: Sembawang Town Council
- Constituencies: Sembawang GRC

Government
  - Mayor: North West CDC: Alex Yam
  - Members of Parliament: Sembawang GRC: Gabriel Lam; Ng Shi Xuan; Ong Ye Kung

Area
  - Total: 12.64 km^{2} (4.88 sq mi)
  - Residential: 3.31 km^{2} (1.28 sq mi)

Population (2026)
  - Total: 115,270
  - Density: 9,119/km^{2} (23,620/sq mi)
- Dwelling units: 20,311
- Projected ultimate: 65,000

Sembawang (IPA: /səmˈbɑːwʌŋ/ səm-BAH-wung) is a planning area and residential town located in the North Region of Singapore. Sembawang planning area is bordered by Simpang to the east, Mandai to the south, Yishun to the southeast, Woodlands to the west and the Straits of Johor to the north. Sembawang is the northernmost planning area of Singapore.

Despite the relatively large development in the Sembawang New Town, the area remains largely suburban, with military, industrial and recreational facilities at its periphery. It hosted a major naval base and port facilities since the early 20th century, and continues to handle regular shipping traffic today along its wharves.

Sembawang has nine subzones, these are Admiralty, Sembawang Central, Sembawang East, Sembawang North, Sembawang Springs, Sembawang Straits, Senoko North, Senoko South and the Wharves.

== Etymology ==
The earliest reference to Sembawang is found in Franklin and Jackson's 1830 Map of Singapore, which refers to the River Tambuwang. The place is said to have got its name from the pokok sembawang (Malay for the kayae ferruginea), which has been renamed Mesua ferruginea from 1980. This tree can be seen at Sembawang Park.

== History ==
The Sembawang area in the early twentieth century was the site of the Nee Soon rubber estate. During colonial times, Sembawang was home to a major British naval base, the construction of which began in 1928 and was completed in 1938. The base included dockyards, wharves and workshops, as well as supporting administrative, residential and commercial areas. The Naval Base has since been handed over to the Singapore government, which in 1968 converted it into a commercial dockyard (as Sembawang Shipyard, now part of Singapore Exchange-listed SembCorp Marine) that went on to become SembCorp, a major state-owned industrial conglomerate. Operations in the Sembawang Shipyard are expected to wind down in 2028, and the area is set for redevelopment into a mixed-use waterfront lifestyle district, with homes, dining and recreation.

Extensive land reclamation throughout Singapore has left Sembawang with one of the country's last natural beaches, the Wak Hassan Beach located at Sembawang Park. Today, the vegetable farms, rubber plantations and Chinese graveyards surrounding the former naval base have given way to modern housing, especially in the 1990s during the development of a New Town by the Singapore Housing and Development Board. The town remains a major port, with Sembawang Wharves handling a high volume of bulk commodities cargo, such as timber and rubber.

The planning of Sembawang New Town started in 1996 where the Woodlands MRT Extension was opened, and Sembawang MRT station was also opened at the same time. When the station was opened, the area was undeveloped except the Canberra Road and the then-developing Sembawang New Town. This was resolved in 1998 because of the accelerating development of Sembawang New Town, which was completed in 2004. These HDB flats were within Sembawang, Canberra and Gambas division.

In late 2022, Sembawang had their first hawker centre and polyclinic at Bukit Canberra, which opened progressively from July 2022 onwards.

== Politics ==
Sembawang once begun as a constituency named Seletar but later carved out forming a dedicated Sembawang Single Member Constituency beginning in the 1955, then resized to a smaller constituency leaving only the northern areas.

Sembawang has always been held by the People's Action Party since its formation and has been expanded to include subregions of Admiralty, Canberra and Naval Base since it became a Group Representation Constituency. Former President of Singapore Tony Tan Keng Yam was one of the notable Members of Parliament of Sembawang and helmed the constituency until 2006; Tanjong Pagar GRC Member of Parliament and former Transport Minister Khaw Boon Wan succeeded him as the anchor minister until 2020, where he was taken over by current Health minister Ong Ye Kung, who first elected there in 2015. One of Sembawang's divisions, Sembawang West, which was managed by Poh Li San, became an SMC in 2025.

== Military ==
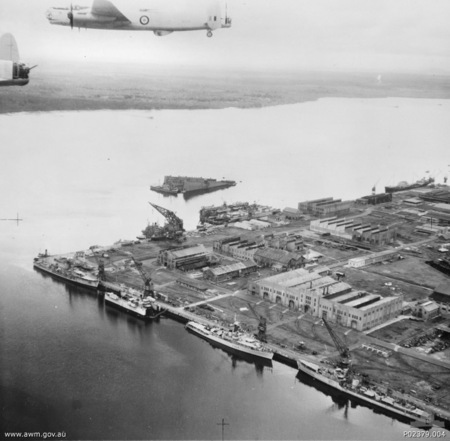
A flight of RAAF Avro Lincoln bombers overflying Singapore Naval Base, June 1953.

External image
- Sembawang Naval Pier
- Sembawang Naval Pier, circa 1990s

The completion of Royal Navy's Singapore Naval Base (also known as HMS Sembawang) in 1938 and RAF Sembawang (also known as HMS Simbang) in March 1940 marked the start of military presence in Sembawang. In February 1942, both bases were partially torched and wrecked by the retreating British forces during the Battle of Singapore to deny their use by units of the advancing Imperial Japanese Army. After the end of World War II in 1945, both bases were reverted to British control and would eventually go on to play an important part in Britain's continued military presence in the Far East (along with the three other RAF bases in Singapore: RAF Changi, RAF Seletar and RAF Tengah) during the critical period of Malayan Emergency (1948–1960), the Brunei Revolt in 1962 and during the Konfrontasi (1962–1966).

Despite the withdrawal of some part of British forces from Singapore in 1971 and the handover of the Singapore Naval Base to Singaporean Government in 1968, the British Ministry of Defence (MoD) continues to maintain Naval Base at Sembawang wharf to control most of the foreign military activities there, which includes repair, refuel and resupply for ships of the Australian, British and New Zealand navies as well as those from other Commonwealth countries under the auspices of Five Power Defence Arrangements (FPDA). This special arrangement was also extended to the United States Navy since early 1960s to support the American involvement in the Vietnam War.

As part of a 1990 agreement between Singapore and the United States, American military forces (primarily naval and air force) have been making use of Sembawang's base facilities. The Task Force 73 (and Commander Logistic Group Western Pacific), part of US 7th Fleet, has been headquartered in Sembawang since 1992.

=== Sembawang Camp ===
The Sembawang Camp is a Singapore Armed Forces military base on Admiralty Road, open only to military personnel on official business. The camp houses the 1st and 3rd Transport Battalion of the Singapore Army, as well as the Republic of Singapore Navy's Naval Diving Unit (NDU). Also, the compound housing the Naval Diving Unit was previously known as Terror Camp in deference to the old admin and Officers club section of the Royal Naval facility which was called HMS Terror.

== Education ==
Sembawang has a total of five primary schools and two secondary schools.

- Five primary schools, including Sembawang Primary School, Canberra Primary School, Endeavour Primary School, Wellington Primary School, and Northoaks Primary School.
- Two secondary schools, including Sembawang Secondary School and Canberra Secondary School.

== Amenities ==
=== Commercial ===
Three shopping centres, including Sembawang Shopping Centre, Canberra Plaza and Sun Plaza next to the Sembawang MRT station.

=== Parks, recreational and sport venues ===
Sembawang Library, which is managed by the National Library Board and situated within the Sun Plaza shopping centre.

- Bukit Canberra, an integrated sports and community hub with amenities such as a hawker centre, polyclinic, a senior care centre, a childcare centre, and several parks, was officially opened on 17 December 2022.
- Sembawang Park, a 15 hectare tranquil park developed in the 1970s and maintained by the National Parks Board, is situated at the Northern tip of Sembawang Road. One of the few parks in Singapore with a natural beach, the Wak Hassan Beach. It is a popular spot for campers as well as families who wish to spend an idyllic day by the beach. One can dine at the Beaulieu House, built in 1910, which was the residence of Admiral Sir Geoffrey Layton (Commander-in-Chief British Eastern Fleet, 1940–1942). A wide range of fauna and flora awaits visitors, ranging from the spectacular cannonball tree (Couroupita guianensis) to the many species of birds which have made the park their nesting grounds. Within the park is a Battleship-themed outdoor playground that pays tribute to the area's naval history.
- Sembawang Hot Spring Park is the only hot spring park found in Singapore. It is located along [Gambas Avenue] near the junction with Sembawang Road. It reopened on 4 January 2020 after upgrading works, and now features a cascading pool and cafe. Main attractions here are dipping your feet in the spring water and cooking eggs in the spring water.
- The Sembawang Park Connector is part of the Park Connector Network managed by the National Parks Board. As their name implies, these connectors aim to form a continuous loop which would hopefully connect all the major parks is a planning area and residential town located the North Region of Singapore. Sembawang planning area is bordered by Simpang to the east, Mandai to the south, Yishun to the southeast, Woodlands to the west and the Straits of Johor to the north.

== Bibliography ==
- The Northern Village. Godfrey Robert, Sharon Han, NBSS Book Project Committee. Singapore. 2020. ISBN 978-981-14-8734-7. OCLC 1237603797.
- Chronicles of Remembrance: Stories of Sembawang GRC Residents for Everyone. 2015.
- Aravindan, Kamaladevi (2020). Sembawang-A Novel. Anitha Devi Pillai. MarshallCavendishEditions: Marshall Cavendish International (Asia) Private Limited. ISBN 978-981-4928-02-1. OCLC 1202463898.
