= 2021 in Singapore =

- Decades: 2000s; 2010s; 2020s
- See also: Other events of 2021; Timeline of Singaporean history

The following lists events that happened during 2021 in the Republic of Singapore.

== Incumbents ==
- President: Halimah Yacob
- Prime Minister: Lee Hsien Loong

== Events ==
Events for the COVID-19 pandemic in Singapore have the "CP" prefix.

=== January ===
- 1 January
  - The smoking age increases to 21.
  - The Monetary Authority of Singapore stops producing the S$1,000 banknote, citing money laundering and terrorism financing risks.
  - The Kuala Lumpur–Singapore high-speed rail project is terminated after no agreement on it was reached by 31 December 2020.
- 4 January – Singapore starts livestreaming Parliament sessions
- 9 January – Robinsons & Co. shuts its last outlet in Raffles City, ending 162 years of operation since 1858.
- 16 January – A review on gender equality issues is extended to the second half of 2021 due to strong interest from participants.
- 20 January – Two separate clusters of tuberculosis with 18 cases are traced to a Singapore Pools Bedok outlet, resulting in voluntary screening of patrons.
- 22 January – NTUC FairPrice opens a new supermarket under the FairPrice Xtra label at Parkway Parade. It is the first supermarket to have dedicated local produce sections, with two exclusive services being a spice-mixing counter and a cocktail bar.
- 23 January – Gali Batu Bus Terminal, located off Woodlands Road, is officially opened to the public.
- 28 January – SilkAir is officially merged into Singapore Airlines.
- 30 January – The Ministry of Social and Family Development declares 2021 the "Year of Celebrating SG Women" as part of an ongoing review.

=== February ===
- 1 February – The Ministry of Sustainability and the Environment announces during a parliamentary motion the upcoming launch of a multi-ministry Singapore Green Plan as a whole-of-nation sustainability strategy. The carbon tax will also be reviewed in 2023, with an expected increase by 2030. The motion is later passed, declaring climate change a global emergency.
- 3 February – CP: The Moderna COVID-19 vaccine is approved by the Health Sciences Authority for use as the second COVID-19 vaccine in Singapore with the first supplies expected in March. Moderna is also required to monitor efficacy of vaccine before full registration.
- 4 February – The Keppel Marina East Desalination Plant is officially opened as Singapore's fourth desalination plant. It is able to treat both sea and reservoir water, and also serves as a recreational facility. Plans are also announced to convert the former Bukit Timah Waterworks into a visitors' centre, with the Linggiu Reservoir revealed to reach healthy levels in a first since 2016.
- 8 February – The Digital for Life movement and fund is launched to get more Singaporeans equipped with digital skills and bridge the digital divide as part of the 2021 President's Challenge.
- 10 February – The Singapore Green Plan 2030 is released, setting new targets in five pillars to make Singapore environmentally-friendly. They include doubling electric vehicle chargers to 60,000 by 2030 and requiring new vehicles to be cleaner energy models, new standards for the Singapore Green Building Masterplan, 20 per cent waste reduction by 2026, having schools reduce their net carbon emissions by two-thirds by 2030 with at least 20 per cent of them carbon-neutral. Jurong Island will also be made a sustainable energy and chemicals park with Singapore being a sustainable tourism destination and a carbon services hub. A new Enterprise Sustainability Programme will be set up for companies, schools will have an Eco Stewardship Programme and Green Plan Conversations will be instituted to get ideas.
- 23 February – Disney+ launches in Singapore, being the first market to offer all six Disney content brands.
- 24 February – An explosion occurs at an industrial building in Tuas. 10 people, three of whom later die, suffer burns.
- 25 February – A review into the sentencing framework for hurt and sexual offences is completed, with a Ministerial Statement to be made soon.

=== March ===
- 5 March – Tougher measures are announced against hurt and sexual offences. They include increasing maximum jail terms for three offences; being three years for molestation and two years for sexual communication between minors aged 14 to 16 and 16 to 18, and objecting to rehabilitation for adult offenders unless in exceptional circumstances. A sentencing guide will be published to raise public awareness, with a Sentencing Advisory Panel set up to issue non-binding sentencing guidelines.
- 22 March – Businessman Ng Yu Zhi is charged with orchestrating the biggest investment fraud in the history of Singapore.
- 28 March – Coastal Playgrove (former Big Splash site), the largest playground with restaurants, is officially opened by Former Prime Minister Goh Chok Tong at East Coast Park.

=== April ===
- 8 April – Deputy Prime Minister Heng Swee Keat steps aside from running as 4G leader owing to health concerns, challenges from the COVID-19 pandemic and a short timeframe, with a new leader picked in due course. As a result, DPM Heng will step down from the Finance Ministry while continuing as DPM, with Senior Minister Teo Chee Hean assigned Acting Prime Minister in PM Lee's absence. A Cabinet change will take place two weeks later.
- 10 April – HometeamNS Clubhouse at Khatib is officially opened to the public and NSmen with bowling alleys, swimming pool, indoor shooting range, T-Play indoor playground, Adventure Hq.
- 20 April – NTP+ Mall at New Tech Park in Lorong Chuan, Singapore is officially opened.
- 23 April – A Cabinet reshuffle results in new leaders taking over seven Ministries, an unprecedented reshuffle less than a year in this Government term.
- 29 April – IKEA's smallest outlet in Singapore and Southeast Asia opens at the Jem shopping mall in Jurong East.

=== May ===
- 14 May – Tray return was announced to be mandatory at hawker centres from 1 June 2021 with enforcement to begin from 1 September 2021.
- 16 May – CP: Following an uptick of COVID-19 cases, Singapore reverts to stricter restrictions under the name "Phase 2 (Heightened Alert)". These restrictions are enforced until 13 June.
- 17 May – A wet market located in a small shopping centre in Sembawang catches fire. The cause of the fire is under investigation.
- 18 May – CP: Singaporeans aged 12 to 15 are now allowed to receive the Pfizer-BioNTech COVID-19 vaccine.
- 19 May – CP: Due to an increase in school-based transmissions of COVID-19, all schools convert to full home-based learning until the end of the semester.

=== June ===
- 1 June
  - A ban on partially hydrogenated oils (PHOs) takes effect.
  - The Protection from Harassment Court is established to hear cases under the Protection from Harassment Act (POHA) with court transfers allowed, save for the Family Justice Courts (at a later date). Enhanced protections under POHA also take effect.
- 2 June – CP: The CoronaVac vaccine is approved for use in Singapore through the special access route.
- 13 June – The Woodlands Integrated Transport Hub opens, becoming the largest such facility in Singapore. The Woodlands Temporary Bus Interchange will continue operations to handle possible congestion.
- 25 June – Lego's largest certified store in Singapore and South-East Asia is opened at Resorts World Sentosa.

=== July ===
- 1 July – Plans are announced to redevelop Bedok Point into a mixed development with residential and commercial components, coming after low footfall at the mall.
- 3 July – Pasir Ris Reconfigured bus interchange is opened to replace the old Pasir Ris bus interchange.
- 5 July – CP: The Ministry of Health announces the commencement of its investigation into the cardiac arrest of a 16-year-old boy who had received his first dose of the COVID-19 vaccine six days prior.
- 6 July – A debate ensues in Parliament over free trade agreements (FTAs) and to correct falsehoods that have spread, particularly around the Comprehensive Economic Cooperation Agreement (CECA). This comes after allegations by the Progress Singapore Party (PSP). The importance of globalisation to Singapore, as well as negotiating FTAs with safeguards and how to help professionals, managers and executives (PMEs) who struggle. Data on foreign workforce numbers and total workers, as well as strategies against discrimination were discussed. In response, PSP supports free trade agreements, but disagrees that CECA benefitted Singapore at that stage.
- 8 July – The new ESports Experience Centre at Kallang Wave Mall is officially opened to youth whom likes sports.
- 11 July – Two buses at the Bukit Batok Bus Interchange collide, resulting in one of the buses breaching a railing and falling a few meters onto another road. Fourteen people were taken to hospital, while another three did not request treatment.
- 14 July – The Sembcorp Tengeh Floating Solar Farm is officially opened as Singapore's first large-scale floating solar farm. Two more such facilities will be built in Bedok and Lower Selatar Reservoirs and completed later this year.
- 19 July – An attack takes place at River Valley High School with an axe, causing the death of a Secondary 1 student. A Secondary 4 student is arrested and subsequently charged with murder the following day.
- 22 July – CP: Due to a recent increase in COVID-19 cases and clusters in Singapore, the country returns to Phase 2 (Heightened Alert) which goes into effect until 18 August.
- 23 July – 8 August – 23 athletes from Singapore compete at the 2020 Summer Olympics in Tokyo, Japan. For the first time since 2004, Singapore did not win any medals.
- 27 July – After the River Valley High School attack, measures are announced for the education system to reduce stress. Among them, all teachers will get enhanced training on mental health literacy, boost the number of teacher-counsellors to more than 1,000 in the next few years from 700 now, recruit more school counsellors or redeploy teachers to these roles, reinstating CCAs in secondary schools and pre-universities in the next few weeks, dedicating more time to regularly check on students' well-being, removing Common Last Topics from the 2021 GCE O, N and A-Level exams, and reducing the scope for the 2021 end-of-year exams in schools. A new interagency mental health taskforce is formed from an earlier group to devise a strategy on this issue. School security measures will continue to be strengthened and updated without losing the sense of safety, trust and homeliness.
- 28 July – The first four companies for Punggol Digital District are confirmed, being Boston Dynamics, Delta Electronics Int’l (Singapore), Group-IB and Wanxiang. The development will now be completed in 2024.

=== August ===
- 3 August – CP: Jurong Fishery Port resumes market activities following a two-week closure owing to a large cluster of COVID-19 cases there.
- 9 August – A ceremonial parade takes place at The Float @ Marina Bay.
- 10 August – CP: Some restrictions are eased under "Preparatory Stage".
- 14 August – Jia Jia, a panda residing at the River Safari, gives birth to Singapore's first panda cub which was conceived via artificial insemination. This comes after seven successive breeding rounds since 2015. The birth is announced the following day. The panda is later revealed to be a boy on 10 September after consultations with experts from China. On 29 December, the panda is named Le Le based on the old Chinese term "Shi Le Po", which referred to Singapore.
- 16 August – Tamil Singaporean actor, TV host & comedian Anandha Kannan died of bladder cancer at Singapore General Hospital.
- 19 August – The Museum of Ice Cream attraction in Singapore is officially opened in Loewen Road, located at the fringe of Orchard Road shopping district.
- 21 August – The National Day Parade 2021 takes place at The Float @ Marina Bay. This is the last major event and is followed by The National Day Parade 2022 before The Float makes way for NS Square.
- 24 August to 5 September – 10 athletes from Singapore compete at the 2020 Summer Paralympics in Tokyo, Japan.
  - 25 August – Swimmer Yip Pin Xiu wins a Paralympic gold medal at the women's 100 metre backstroke S2 finals.
  - 2 September – Yip Pin Xiu wins a second Paralympic gold medal at the women's 50 metre backstroke S2 finals.
- 27 August – The National University of Singapore announces that the Yale-NUS College will close in 2025 and merge with the University Scholars Programme (USP) to form a new college that will take in new students in 2022. A petition titled "#NoMoreTopDown" is drafted and calls for the reversal of this decision. It receives over 10,000 signatures.
- 28 August – The second stage of the Thomson–East Coast MRT line, spanning from Springleaf to Caldecott, opens.
- 29 August
  - New employment policies are announced to support lower-wage workers. Annual Workfare spending will be increased from $850 million now to $1.1 billion, allowing higher payouts and those 30 and above to be included in the scheme, up from the current 35. Firms that employ foreigners must pay all local staff at least $1,400 monthly as part of a Local Qualifying Salary, which will be adjusted progressively. The Progressive Wage Model (PWM) will be extended to retail from 2022, with food services and waste management following suit, along with occupational PWMs for administrative assistants and drivers for a start. A Progressive Wage Mark will be introduced to acknowledge companies which pay workers fairly, with the public sector only buying from such companies. The Ministry of Manpower will study ways to enhance protection for delivery workers and others with similar platform relationships given the lack of basic protection and benefits for these workers that most employees are entitled to.
  - Anti-discrimination guidelines by Tripartite Alliance for Fair & Progressive Employment Practices (TAFEP) will be enshrined into law to give greater protection and penalties against workplace discrimination, coming after feedback over the years. A tribunal for workplace discrimination will also be created based on the existing Employment Claims Tribunal to provide more protection against discrimination based on nationality, age, race, religion and disability among others, with women getting better protection too. Criteria for Employment Passes and S Passes will be tightened progressively over time.
  - After several incidents involving race, a new law called the Maintenance of Racial Harmony Act is proposed to tackle racial tensions, consolidating existing laws like provisions in the Penal Code for punishments, as well as take a softer approach to these issues through persuasion and rehabilitation. The law will be based on the existing Maintenance of Religious Harmony Act. In addition, tudungs will be allowed for Muslim nurses in the public healthcare sectors from November, although rules in the Singapore Armed Forces, the Home Team and for students in schools will remain unchanged. The new rules take effect on 1 November.
- 30 August – Strides Taxi, Formerly known as SMRT Taxi (that was launched in August 2003 after a merger from TIBS Taxi) was officially launched with the new lime green colour electric taxis in Singapore.

=== September ===
- 1 September
  - A full ban on domestic ivory trade takes effect, with exemptions for educational and religious purposes, as well as musical instruments and personal effects with ivory.
  - Oasia Resort Sentosa is opened.
  - Enforcement of mandatory tray return at hawker centres under Singapore's Environmental Public Health Act officially began.
- 5 September – Bus services under the Sembawang-Yishun Bus Package are handed over from the SMRT Corporation to Tower Transit Singapore.
  - In particular; Services 853, 853M, 854, 854e, 855, 856 and 857, which serve from Yishun Bus Interchange.
- 8 September – The launch of vaccinated travel lanes (VTLs) takes effect, first serving Brunei and Germany. Fully vaccinated travellers under the scheme will undergo multiple COVID-19 polymerase chain reaction tests without needing to serve a Stay-Home Notice.
- 14 September – Two parliamentary motions on jobs and foreign talent policy are debated simultaneously, lasting 10 hours until past midnight. The government's motion, tabled by Finance Minister Lawrence Wong, passes, while an opposing motion tabled by Leong Mun Wai of the Progress Singapore Party is rejected. Members of Parliament (MPs) belonging to the Workers' Party (WP) vote against both motions after two amendments are rejected.
- 15 September – Rivervale Community Club is opened for operations.
- 18 September – Prime Minister Lee Hsien Loong announces the release of a white paper on gender equality in early 2022. The paper will outline three areas; ensuring equal workplace opportunities, better support for caregivers including enhancing the Home Caregiving Grant, and strengthening protection for women both physically and online. In addition, a garden at Dhoby Ghaut Green will be dedicated to acknowledge women's contributions to Singapore.
- 19 September – Bus services under the Sembawang-Yishun Bus Package are handed over from the SMRT Corporation to Tower Transit Singapore.
  - In particular; Services 963, 963e, 963R, 965, 966 and 969, which serve from Woodlands Bus Interchange.
- 27 September – CP: Singapore enters a "Stabilisation Phase" in order to stabilise recent increases in COVID-19 cases. The phase is originally scheduled to run until 24 October.

=== October ===
- 2 October – Two polyclinics open in Bukit Panjang and Kallang respectively (the first new Polyclinic officially opening the same day), with a polyclinic slated to open in Eunos in December. A new polyclinic will open in Tiong Bahru by 2030, replacing two existing facilities in Bukit Merah and Outram.
- 3 October – Bus services under the Sembawang-Yishun Bus Package are handed over from the SMRT Corporation to Tower Transit Singapore.
  - In particular; Services 167, 825, 859, 859A, 859B, 882, 882A, 883, 883A, 980 and 981, which serve from Sembawang Bus Interchange.
- 4 October
  - Three Singapore Airlines aircraft are towed from Changi Airport to the Changi Exhibition Centre to be scrapped, marking the very first time the airline has done so locally.
  - The Foreign Interference (Countermeasures) Act is passed in Parliament with a vote of 75–11.
- 13 October – Wildlife Reserves Singapore rebrands as the Mandai Wildlife Group. New logos for all its five parks are unveiled, with River Safari being renamed to River Wonders, and Bird Paradise replacing Jurong Bird Park when it relocates to Mandai in 2023. Rainforest Wild will still be completed by 2024, being equipped with a new rehabilitation centre for rescued wild animals. The Group will also form Mandai Nature and Mandai Global for conservation and business purposes respectively. A new amphitheatre for Night Safari and revamped Kidzworld in Singapore Zoo will be completed by 2022 and 2023 respectively, with a new Ranger Buddies programme for kids soon.
- 19 October – CP: VTL expands to include some European and North American countries.
- 20 October – CP: Singapore extends the "Stabilisation Phase" to 21 November.
- 28 October – The revamped Choa Chu Kang Public Library reopens with hydroponic features after two years of closure.
- 29 October – Northshore Plaza l in Punggol outside Samudera LRT Station is opened, with Northshore Plaza ll to open on 21 January 2022, and also two phases of the HDB's sea front-facing shopping mall in Punggol being officially opened on 24 July that year.
- Decathlon's second two-story Experience store at Punggol Northshore Plaza is opened.

=== November ===
- 1 November – Mandatory tray return is extended to foodcourts and coffeeshops with enforcement from 1 January 2022.
- 6 November
  - A double-decker bus crashes into a taxi bay shelter near Yishun MRT station, resulting in the structure partially collapsing. Three people, including the driver, were taken to Khoo Teck Puat Hospital.
  - Courts Nojima at The Heeren at Orchard Road progressively opens with its first three levels, with the remaining levels to progressively open in 2022. The other Courts store will be shut down.
- 8 November – CP: VTL expands, with the addition of Australia and Switzerland.
- 15 November – CP: VTL expands to include South Korea.
- 16 to 19 November – Singapore hosts the Bloomberg New Economy Forum.
- 22 November – CP: Singapore exits the "Stabilisation Phase".
- 27 November – The Timbre+ Eastside at Singapore Expo is officially opened with its second outlet of this place which was firstly opened at One North back in 2016.
- 29 November – CP: VTL expands to include Malaysia, covering flights between Singapore and Kuala Lumpur, as well as the Causeway. Sweden, Finland, Indonesia and India are also included too.
- 30 November – Raeesah Khan, then-MP for Sengkang Group Representation Constituency (GRC), resigns from the Workers' Party and Parliament while under investigation for lying in Parliament.

=== December ===
- 6 December – CP: A proposed expansion of VTL was supposed to include Qatar, Saudi Arabia and the United Arab Emirates. The VTLs have since been deferred due to risks from the Omicron variant.
- 10 December – CP: Singaporeans aged 5 to 11 are now allowed to receive the Pfizer-BioNTech COVID-19 vaccine, the first approved for children. Booster shots are extended to those aged 18 to 29. The Pfizer-BioNTech COVID-19 vaccine is also approved for full registration.
- 14 December – CP: An expansion of VTL to include Thailand.
- 15 December – SkyHelix attraction at Sentosa is officially opened, as well as the reopening of HSBC Treetop walk at MacRitchie Reservoir.
- 16 December
  - Property cooling measures take effect.
  - CP: An expansion of VTL to include Cambodia, Fiji, Maldives, Sri Lanka and Turkey.
- 17 December – Eunos Polyclinic is opened.
- 21 December – The new 100m underground tunnel to Funan Mall from City Hall MRT Station is opened.
- 23 December
  - CP: To prevent the spread of the Omicron variant, ticket sales under VTLs are suspended until 20 January 2022. Those already holding VTL tickets prior to 22 December are not affected by the suspension.
  - i12 Katong starts reopening in phases after renovations, with the mall being fully reopen on 23 June 2022.
  - The new NTUC Fairprice supermarket under the 'Fairprice Finest' label is officially opened to shoppers at the premises of Raffles Medical Holland Village shopping centre.
- 30 December
  - Le Le, the panda born in River Wonders, debuts in its new nursery.
  - The Ministry of Health announces new rules for drinks known as "Nutri-Grade" to encourage healthier choices, taking effect on 30 December 2022. They include grading drinks according to the four grades with those "C" and "D" required to carry them, have a nutrition information panel detailing the drink's nutritional value, and bans on advertising "D" drinks.

== Deaths ==
- 4 January – Mahmud Awang, founding member and 1st Chairman of National Trades Union Congress and former PAP Member of Parliament for Kampong Kapor Constituency (b. 1928).
- 10 January – Yeng Pway Ngon, Chinese literature writer (b. 1947).
- 29 January – Louis Lim, research and development pioneer (b. 1939).
- 6 February – Jarnail Singh, aviation medicine pioneer (b. 1953).
- 16 February – Saw Swee Hock, statistician and philanthropist (b. 1931).
- 9 March – Milan Kwee, Singapore National Olympic Council vice-president and Singapore Taekwondo Federation president (b. 1946).
- 10 March – Lee Chiong Giam, diplomat and civil servant (b. 1942).
- 15 March – Yong Nen Khiong, pioneer of first open-heart surgery in Singapore and surgeon (b. 1927).
- 29 March – Jean Marshall, social work pioneer and spouse of David Marshall (b. 1926).
- 30 April – Ling How Doong, 2nd Chairman of the Singapore Democratic Party and former Member of Parliament for Bukit Gombak SMC (b. 1935).
- 15 June – Goh Joon Seng, former judge of the Supreme Court and former member of the Council of Presidential Advisers (b. 1935).
- 1 July – Huang Hsing Hua, former Deputy Vice-Chancellor of the National University of Singapore (b. 1932).
- 19 July – Ethan Hun Ze Kai, Singaporean student who was the victim of the River Valley High School attack (b. 2007–2008).
- 16 August – Anandha Kannan, Tamil Singaporean MediaCorp actor, TV Host and comical star (b. 1974).
- 14 October – Sarkasi Said, contemporary batik artist (b. 1940).
- 15 October – Kenneth Gin Ying Doon, civil engineer and 1st President of the Institution of Engineers (b. 1924).
- 22 December – Poh Lip Meng, national sport shooter (b. 1969).
- 26 December – Phua Bah Lee, former PAP Member of Parliament for Tampines Constituency (b. 1932).
