= Yishun Library =

Public library in Singapore

Coordinates: 1°25′41.4″N 103°50′10.0″E

- Location: 930 Yishun Avenue 2, #04-01, Northpoint City North Wing, Singapore 769098, Singapore
- Type: Public library
- Established: 26 February 1998; 28 years ago
- Branch of: National Library Board

Collection
- Size: 121,000

Yishun Library (Simplified Chinese: 义顺图书馆), is a public library located in Yishun in the North Region of Singapore. It is currently located at Level 4, North Wing of Northpoint City and serves the areas of Yishun, Khatib and Canberra. The target community includes residents of Chong Pang, Nee Soon Central, Nee Soon East and Nee Soon South.

== History ==
=== 1998-2008: official opening ===
Yishun Public Library was first opened on 26 February 1998 by Associate Professor Ho Peng Kee, then Minister of State for Law and Home Affairs and Member of Parliament for Sembawang GRC. Its original location was on the third level of the former Sembawang Town Council building at Block 290 Yishun Street 22, Singapore 760290. The library was closed on 13 October 2008 following plans to move community libraries into malls.

=== 2008-2017: relocation ===
The library was soon reopened to the public on 14 November that year, in a new location within the fourth level of Northpoint City's new extension wing and now closer to Yishun MRT station. The floor area of the new site doubled to approximately 2000 square meters with seating capacity for 220 people, compared to 60 previously. The updated collection consists of 150,000 books, 350 magazine and 10 newspaper titles, with 57 per cent of the entire collection being newly acquired. A new Café Galilee also opened within the library premises. The cafe later closed down in 2014.

=== 2017-present: renovation ===
On 15 January 2017, Northpoint City underwent a mall-wide overhaul as part of a refurbishment and Asset Enhancement Initiative (AEI). During this time, the library also carried out its own renovation works. It was then reopened on 3 February 2018 with a revamped 2530 square meters space.

== Layout and features ==
Design of the library interior incorporated Yishun's heritage as a natural plantation, reflected by wooden themes. The entire library is connected by one main pathway, guided by a ceiling light panel feature that leads into various sections of the library:

- Digital Learning Zone
- Children's Zone
- Quiet Reading Lounge

=== Digital Learning Zone ===
The zone provides a dedicated space to feature an extensive variety of National Library Board's (NLB) digital collection for seamless browsing and easy consumption. It is the first of Singapore's public libraries to house a dedicated zone for digital content. The zone has 7 learning pods with an interactive screen each, providing users access to learning resources from e-learning platforms such as LyndaLibrary and Ted Talks. Comprising 12 wall-mounted screens, virtual bookshelves and animated book features are among content that is displayed on the screens. Users are able to borrow books by scanning QR codes or embark on virtual tours of past exhibitions organised by the National Library.

=== Children's Zone ===
The Children's Zone has customised curations specific to age groups, with books displayed in a front-facing manner. The area has child-friendly furniture and seating spaces designed to encourage families to sit and read together. The zone also features an Early Literacy Collection placed on low shelves. It is grouped into 5 main categories of "Sense & Sensation", "Concepts", "Languages", "Poetry & Rhymes" and "Emergent Reader" for caregivers' reference to support the development of their child. Computer catalogue stations are also fixed at a lower height to enable young users to conduct library material searches with ease.

=== Quiet Reading Lounge ===
The area has 26 wooden individual nooks, each having an individual light switch. The ambient darkened environment aims to facilitate reflections and contemplative reading. The concept is inspired by a "time-out" experience to create an undistracted pocket of time amid the busy lifestyles of users.
