= Stanley Street =

Stanley Street may refer to:

Streets:

- Stanley Street, Brisbane
- Stanley Street, Sydney
- Stanley Street, Hong Kong
- Stanley Street, Liverpool
- Stanley Street (Montreal)
- Stanley Street, Singapore

In fiction:

- Stanley Street, the prime setting of the fictional London-based soap opera Family Affairs

Other uses:

- ASB Tennis Centre, formerly called the "Stanley Street Courts", in Auckland, New Zealand
