= Bandar Utama school stabbing =

2025 murder in Malaysia

- The victim of the attack, Yap Shing Xuen
- Location: SMK Bandar Utama Damansara (4), Bandar Utama, Selangor, Malaysia
- Date: 14 October 2025; 13 months ago 9:20 a.m. – 9:35 a.m. (UTC+8:00)
- Target: Yap Shing Xuen; Other school students and teachers (presumed)
- Attack type: Stabbing
- Weapons: Two knives, including one karambit
- Deaths: 1 (Yap Shing Xuen)
- Perpetrator: "LCH" (Note: As named in the court judgment. Real name publicly withheld due to being a minor per Section 15 of Child Act 2001.)
- Motive: Mental disorder, but allegations include: Anti-social behaviour; Misogynist terrorism; Incel ideology
- Charges: One count of murder
- Verdict: Not guilty on grounds of insanity (on appeal)
- Litigation: Various government agencies, parents of "LCH", and "LCH" are being sued by Yap Shing Xuen's mother.

The Bandar Utama school stabbing occurred on 14 October 2025, where Yap Shing Xuen (Chinese: 叶芯嫙; pinyin: Yè Xīnxuán), a 15-year-old Malaysian Form 3 schoolgirl, was murdered by stabbing at SMK Bandar Utama Damansara (4), Bandar Utama, Selangor, Malaysia. The perpetrator, "LCH", was a 14-year-old Form 1 student of the same school.

== Murder ==
Between 9:20 and 9:35 a.m MYT on 14 October 2025, Yap left her classroom to use the restroom, where the perpetrator followed her. After discarding his mask (which he always wear at all time) and confronting her at knifepoint, he forced her into a cubicle and locked the door. When Yap rejected his confession and attempted to escape, the perpetrator stabbed her in the neck and chest between 180 and 200 times, which he only stopped because of the smell of blood. One of the teacher heard the screams of Yap and kicked down the door of the cubicle. The perpetrator, uniform covered with bloodstains, went to the school assembly area and discarded his weapons except a knife. He then went to his classroom to retrieve his water bottle amidst the chaos and panic in the school. His brother, also a student of the school, approached and disarmed him. He was arrested without any resistance with the help of the teachers.

A graduation ceremony planned on the same day was called off after the attack.

== Investigation ==
The Royal Malaysia Police classified the case as murder. The offence carries the death penalty in Malaysia or between 30 and 40 years of imprisonment plus caning; however, the former cannot be applied because of the murderer being underage. Initial investigation revealed that there was no interaction between the suspect and the victim before the attack, contrary to social media beliefs that the victim rejected the suspect's romantic advances. No elements of school bullying were found during the investigation. Two knives–a Marine combat knife with the words "Sandy Hook 2012" and "Adam Lanza" engraved and a karambit with the name "Seung-Hui Cho" engraved–were seized for investigation.

=== Suspect's handwritten note ===
Shortly after Yap's death, a handwritten note, allegedly written by the suspect, was circulated on social media. The note, mainly written in Chinese with some parts in English and Japanese Romaji, contains excerpts of the anime series Death Note and references to notable school shooting incidents such as the Columbine High School massacre, Virginia Tech shooting, Uvalde school shooting, and Sandy Hook Elementary School shooting.

== Trial and appeal ==
The suspect was charged on 22 October 2025. The High Court ordered the suspect to be sent to Tanjung Rambutan Psychiatric Hospital for a one-month psychiatric assessment. He was later assessed as fit to stand trial and was transferred to Puncak Alam Correctional Centre in Selangor for further evaluation. The court proceedings was scheduled to 6 February 2026. The defence witness, Dr. Ian Lloyd from Hospital Bahagia Ulu Kinta, testified that the suspect suffered from schizophrenia and mental illness, and experienced delusions since he was nine years old. On 14 September, the Shah Alam High Court found the suspect to be of unsound mind during the incident and was acquitted on grounds of insanity. The court ordered him to be detained and treated at Hospital Bahagia Ulu Kinta, Perak, at the pleasure of the Sultan of Selangor.

Following the acquittal of the suspect, Yap's mother, Wong Lee Ping, appealed to the public to support a petition to urge the Attorney-General's Chambers (AGC) to appeal the court's ruling. At the same time, Wanita DAP urged the AGC to brief Yap's family on the court's ruling. On 24 September, the AGC filed an appeal.

== Public response ==
Several domestic leaders expressed their support and condolences in the immediate aftermath of the murder, including former Youth and Sports Minister Hannah Yeoh, and Nurul Izzah Anwar.

=== Allegations of manosphere subculture ===
Several feminist individuals and groups condemned the murder, claiming that the attack was motivated by the incel subculture and femicide. Activist Ain Husniza Saiful Nizam, founder and executive director of the feminist non-government organization Pocket of Pink (POP), launched a demonstration march from Taman Tugu Negara to Malaysian Parliament Building on 22 October 2025 in response, which include activists, student movements and politician Wan Ahmad Fayhsal Wan Ahmad Kamal. The group also demanded the resignation of Minister of Education Fadhlina Sidek over her mishandling of the case including previous bullying and rape cases involving secondary school students.

== Aftermath ==
Yap's family conducted a five-day funeral, conducted in Buddhist rites for her in Nirvana 2 Memorial Centre, Kuala Lumpur, which was attended by Nurul Izzah Anwar and Hannah Yeoh. Flower wreaths were sent to the funeral, including from the Yang Di-Pertuan Agong Sultan Ibrahim Iskandar. Yeoh placed the Malaysian national jersey in Yap's coffin, citing her active involvement in her school's volleyball team. Yap was cremated in 20 October 2025 in Nirvana Memorial Park Crematorium, Shah Alam, Selangor. Her parents were absent during the cremation due to the traditional Chinese belief of not encouraging parents to witness the burial of their children.

On 25 September 2026, Yap's mother, Wong Lee Ping, announced that the family is planning to pursue a civil suit against certain parties, later revealed to be a number of government agencies, the parents of "LCH", and "LCH" himself filed at the Kuala Lumpur High Court. Wong is suing as Yap's estate administrator and in her own right for the sum of RM120,602 for Yap's funeral expenses in special damages and any general damages assessed by the High Court.

== See also ==
- Sandy Hook Elementary School shooting, which the perpetrator took inspiration from
- Seung-Hui Cho, whom the perpetrator took inspiration from
- River Valley High School attack, in Singapore
