= Ng Yu Zhi =

Singaporean businessman and investor

Ng Yu Zhi (born c. 1987), also known as Ng You Zhi, is a Singaporean alleged con artist and fraudster. The former director of Envy Global Trading, he was charged in March 2021 with running the largest Ponzi scheme in the history of Singapore, worth about S$1.5 billion.

== Business career ==
Ng founded and directed Envy Asset Management and Envy Global Trading. He was a major shareholder in several eateries, including Cicada in Clarke Quay and Nishikane and Sake Labo in Stanley Street. He also invested in a range of other business, including an interior design firm and a veterinary clinic. According to the Business Times, Ng was also an "increasingly visible figure in Singapore's philanthropic community" who had a "positive public image" until his arrest, with the Yong Loo Lin School of Medicine at the National University of Singapore commending him in August 2020 for his philanthropy.

== Fraud allegations ==
Following a probe in November 2020 by the Commercial Affairs Department (CAD) into suspicious activities carried out by his two companies, Ng was arrested on 16 February 2021. On 22 March 2021, he was charged with cheating and "being a party to fraudulent trading". He posted S$1.5 million bail and remained under 24-hour monitoring. The following month, he was charged with forging bank documents. In July 2021, his bail was raised to S$4 million.

According to the prosecution, as part of an alleged Ponzi scheme that stretched from October 2017 till February 2021, Ng courted investors for funds to purchase nickel metal from a company called Poseidon Nickel at a discounted price. The nickel would be resold for a profit to BNP Paribas Commodity Futures or Raffemet; Ng allegedly guaranteed his investors three-month profits averaging 15 per cent. However, independent investigators alleged that the nickel being traded was nonexistent, and that between S$300 million and S$474 million was transferred to Ng's personal bank accounts. About S$1.5 billion was invested in the alleged scam, with S$731 million returned to investors, and around S$1 billion owed to them. Ng's alleged scam reportedly ensnared some 300 victims; if convicted, Ng would have had executed the largest investment fraud in the history of Singapore.

As a result of the fraud allegations, Ng's restaurant Cicada closed, and Nishikane and Sake Labo were put up for sale by liquidators. He was declared bankrupt in 2022. During his trial, one witness testified that two investors in his alleged Ponzi scheme "had died directly or indirectly because of pressure from this case."

== Personal life ==
Ng is divorced from Fujian native Coco Cai Meizhen (born c. 1991), with whom he has one son and one daughter. He lived with his family in a rented three-storey bungalow in Bukit Timah and owned a penthouse in Orchard Road. He reportedly had a vast collection of sports cars and other luxury goods worth around S$100 million—including the only Pagani Huayra in Singapore—which was seized by the Commercial Affairs Department (CAD) in 2021 as part of investigations into his alleged fraud.
