= Adhisaya Ulagam =

2012 Indian film by Shakthi Scott

- Theatrical release poster
- Directed by: Shakthi Scott
- Written by: Shakthi Scott
- Produced by: R. Banuchitra
- Starring: J. Livingston; Sreelakshmy N. Nair; Mannan Prithivraj
- Cinematography: Sathish G
- Music by: Shakthi Scott
- Production companies: Tittu Productions; Dreamgate Animation
- Release date: 10 August 2012 (India)
- Running time: 95 minutes
- Country: India
- Language: Tamil

Adhisaya Ulagam (transl. World of Wonders) is a 2012 Indian Tamil-language science fantasy film written and directed by Shakthi Scott and produced by R. Banuchitra. The film stars J. Livingston, Sreelakshmy N. Nair, and Mannan Prithivraj.

This project, combining animation with live action, is marked as India's first 3D film featuring dinosaurs. In the film, a scientist invents a time machine through which he and his grandchildren are accidentally transported to the prehistoric world. There, they encounter numerous extinct animals, including dinosaurs.

The film was released on 10 August 2012 to negative reviews and went unnoticed.

== Plot ==
Professor Neelakantan is a maverick scientist and inventor who develops and constructs a time machine and begins experimenting with it. He realizes that his machine requires a recognized "object" to work, so he seeks to locate such an object that can be transported through time. He jokingly tells his pet dog that he would use it as the "object".

Varsha and Vikas are Neelakantan's mischievous grandchildren who live with their parents and are very fond of their grandfather. While visiting, the two children enter Neelakantan's laboratory in his absence and start playing with the dog. Varsha throws a ball that strikes the time machine's control screen and accidentally turns on the device, which recognizes Varsha and Vikas as transferable "objects". Neelakantan enters the room and is shocked to see the machine's condition, but it is too late. As he tries to save the kids, he too is recognized as an "object" by the machine, and he and his grandchildren are accidentally transported to the year 16,50,26,188 BC. (Note: Rounded to 16.5 crore years ago (or 165 million years ago), corresponding to the late Bathonian or early Callovian ages of the Middle Jurassic period.) They encounter several extinct animals, including dangerous dinosaurs. At first, they are afraid and struggle to understand what to do. But gradually, they try to befriend the dinosaurs. They wish to return to modern times, but to do this, they need a source of electricity, which does not exist in the prehistoric times they have been transported to. How they survive their circumstances and finally manage to return to the present is the main plot of the film.

== Cast ==
- J. Livingston as Neelakantan
- Sreelakshmy N. Nair as Varsha
- Mannan Prithivraj as Vikas
- George Vishnu as Hariraman
- Anandha Kannan as Boo Boo, a prehistoric man
- Latha Rao as Sudha
- Lena Mohan as Rangabashyam
- Jaffar Ali as Billy (voice)

== Production ==
"The movie revolves around a scientist who invents a time machine and how his grandchildren accidentally get teleported to the prehistoric era. We have created dinosaurs using computer graphics."

— Director Shakthi Scott on the film

Adhisaya Ulagam 3D was the first Indian 3D film that featured dinosaurs. The film was shot using a Dual Lens Panasonic 3D Camera. The dinosaurs shown in this film were created using computer animation and graphics, and a total of 15 species of dinosaurs were depicted.

The film was produced under the banners of Tittu Productions – Dreamgate Animation. Shakti Scott, who directed of the film, also composed its music, wrote its screenplay, and handled editing and graphics.

== Release and reception ==
Professional reviews
Review Scores
Source	Rating
The Times of India	1/5 stars

The film was released on 10 August 2012 in India. The Times of India gave the film one out of five stars, saying the director failed as a storyteller and calling it "a bland Jurassic adventure". They described the film plot as a mix of those from Back to the Future and Jurassic Park and found the storytelling and graphic works unimpressive. They wrote, "But when even the five-year-old kids in the theatre get restless, it is a clear sign that the filmmaker has failed as a storyteller."

== See also ==
- List of films featuring dinosaurs
