= Northpoint City =

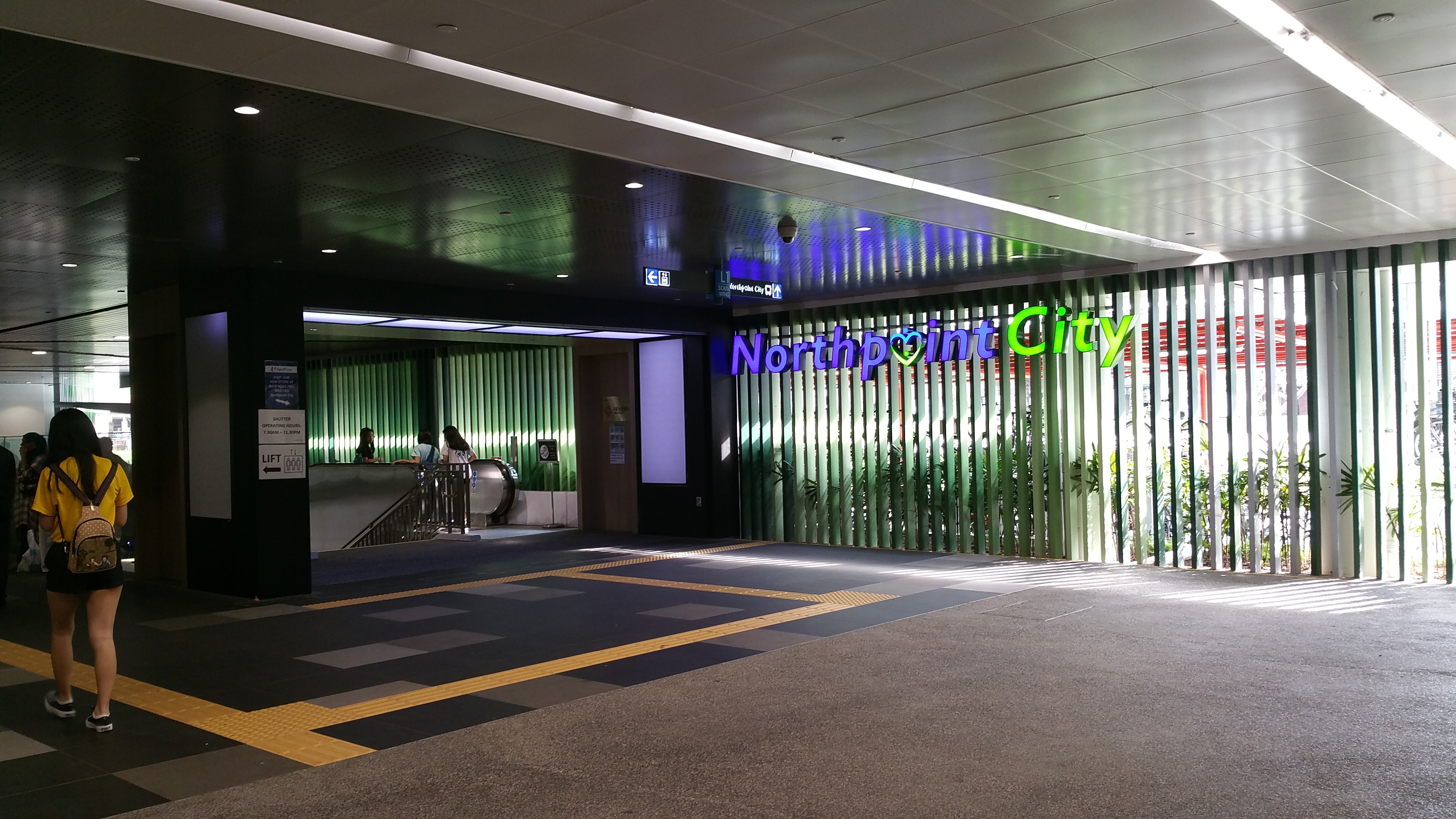
- Northpoint Link entrance to Northpoint City
- Location: Yishun, Singapore
- Coordinates: 1°25′41.4″N 103°50′10.0″E
- Address: 930 Yishun Avenue 2, Singapore 769098 (North Wing); 1 Northpoint Drive, Singapore 768019 (South Wing)
- Opened: November 1992; 34 years ago (North Wing); December 2017; 8 years ago (South Wing)
- Developer: Frasers Centrepoint
- Manager: Frasers Centrepoint
- Owner: Frasers Centrepoint Trust
- Num. of stores: 400
- Floor area: 1,300,000 square feet (120,000 m^{2})
- Floors: 7
- Public transit: NS13 Yishun; Yishun
- Website: Northpoint City

Northpoint City, formerly known as Northpoint Shopping Centre, is a suburban shopping mall in Yishun, Singapore. Located opposite Yishun MRT station, the mall houses the Nee Soon Central Community Club, Yishun Library as well as the Yishun Bus Interchange, which forms part of the Yishun Integrated Transport Hub (ITH).

The mall was first opened in 1992, and was renovated and expanded in 2008. It subsequently underwent a second renovation and expansion from 2017 to early 2018. It is currently the largest shopping mall in northern Singapore. The centre has a combined net lettable area of at least 1,300,000 sq ft (120,000 m^{2}) and houses more than 400 tenants.

== History ==
Northpoint City was originally called the Northpoint Shopping Centre, having been first constructed in November 1992 as the first suburban mall to be built in the northern heartlands of Singapore. Cold Storage, Swensen's and Giordano were one of the first few outlets to open in the Northpoint Shopping Centre.

=== Renamed and expanded ===
In July 2017, Northpoint Shopping Centre was renamed as Northpoint City, with the existing building becoming its north wing. The south wing of the mall was opened in December 2017, integrating Northpoint City with the Yishun Integrated Transport Hub (ITH) and Nee Soon Central Community Club. It was the first time in Singapore that different public facilities were integrated in this manner. A 920-unit condominium called the North Park Residences was also constructed atop Northpoint City.

Yishun Library reopened on 3 February 2018, located at the fourth level of the North Wing. A linkway to the South Wing from the MRT station was also constructed.

== Facilities ==
The two wings of Northpoint City are connected via an underground garden at in the basement.

Notable tenants include BreadTalk, Bengawan Solo, DON DON DONKI, Harvey Norman, Popular, Timezone, UNIQLO, Kopitiam, Anytime Fitness, NTUC FairPrice, Yishun Library and Krispy Kreme.

=== Transport ===
Northpoint City is directly connected to the Yishun Integrated Transport Hub (ITH), which includes Yishun MRT station and Yishun Bus Interchange.

== Gallery ==
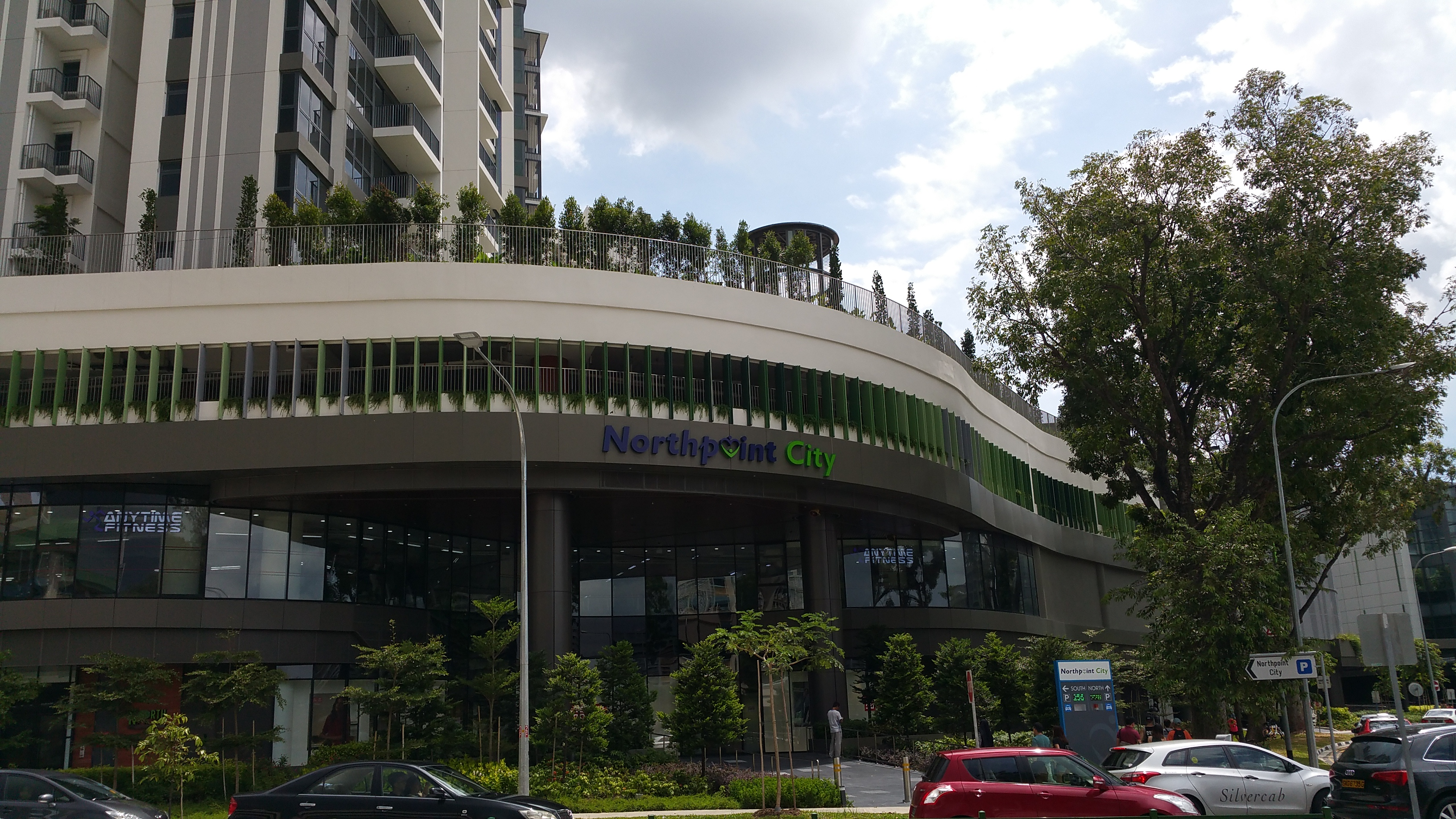
Northpoint City South Wing

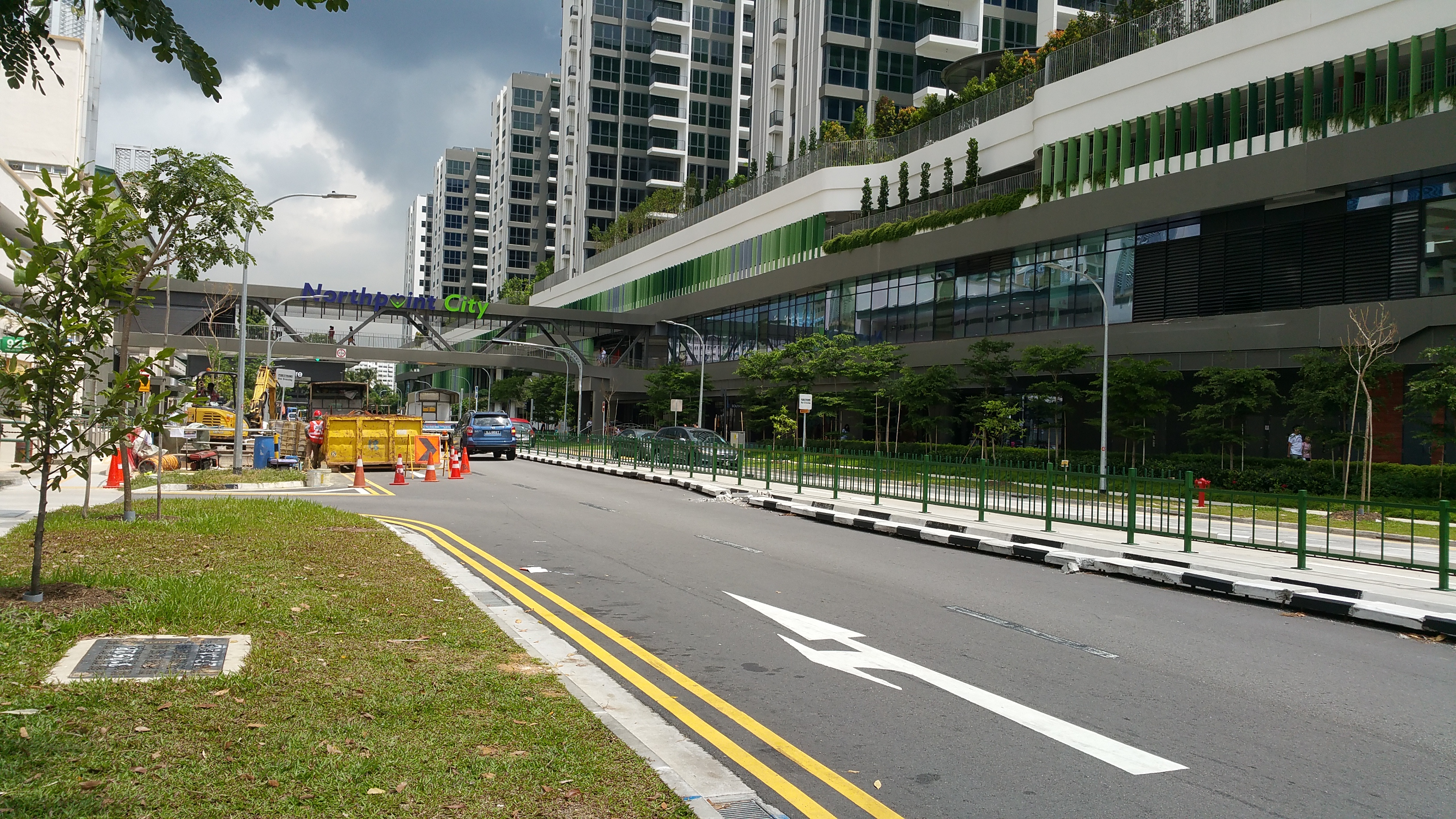
Northpoint Drive leading to South Wing Carpark

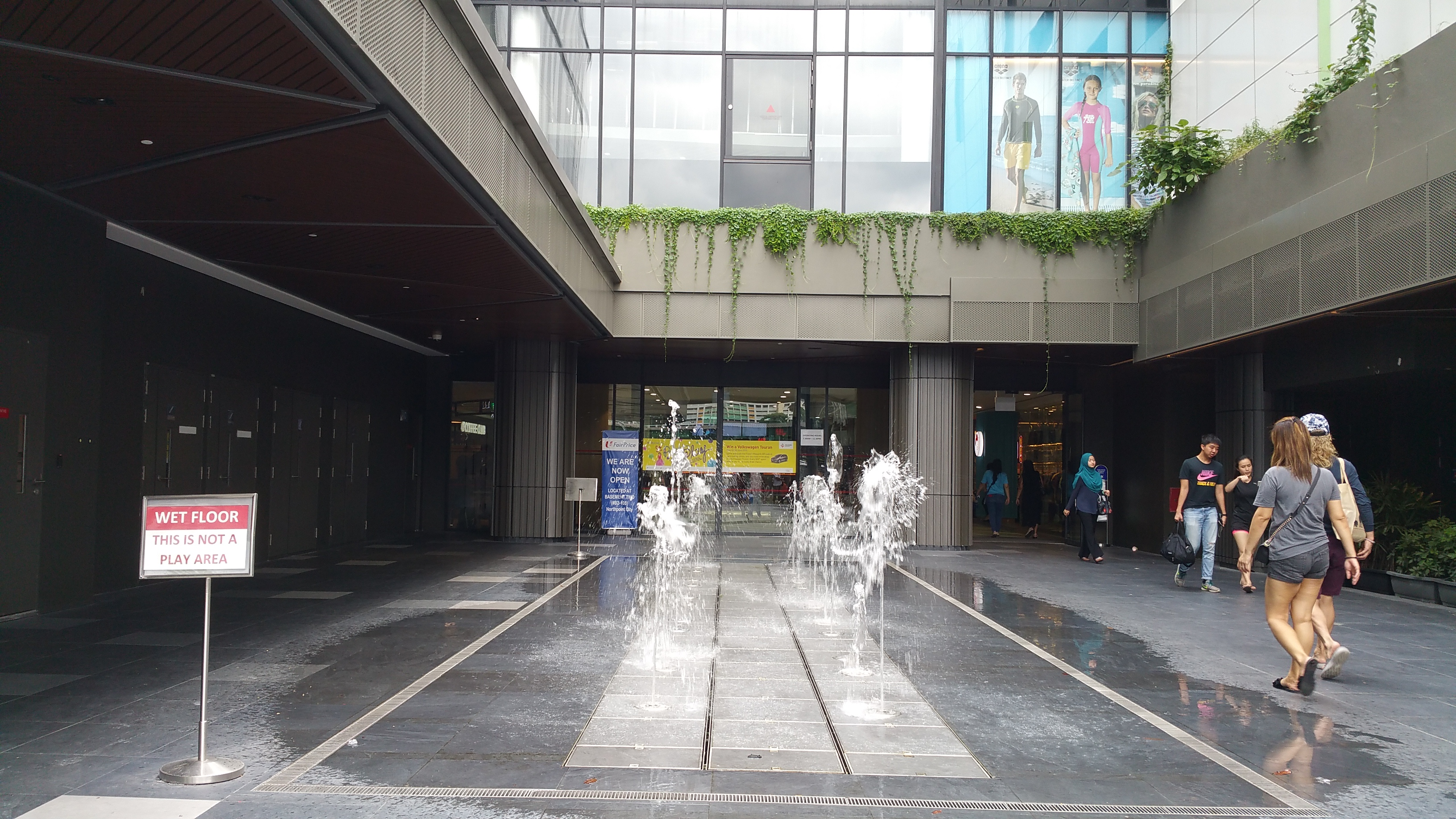
Northpoint City fountain located between North and South Wing

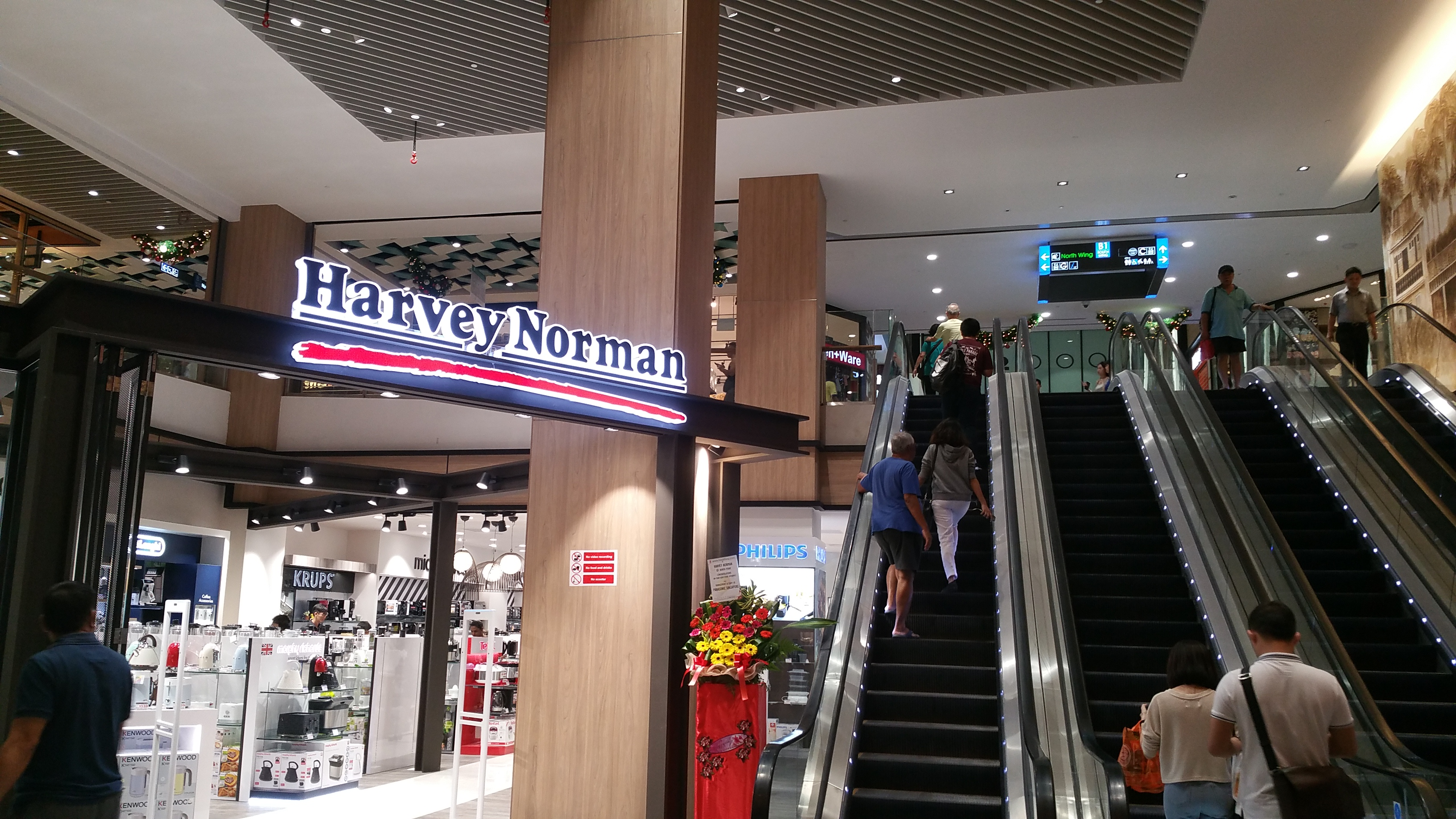
Interior of South Wing at Basement 2

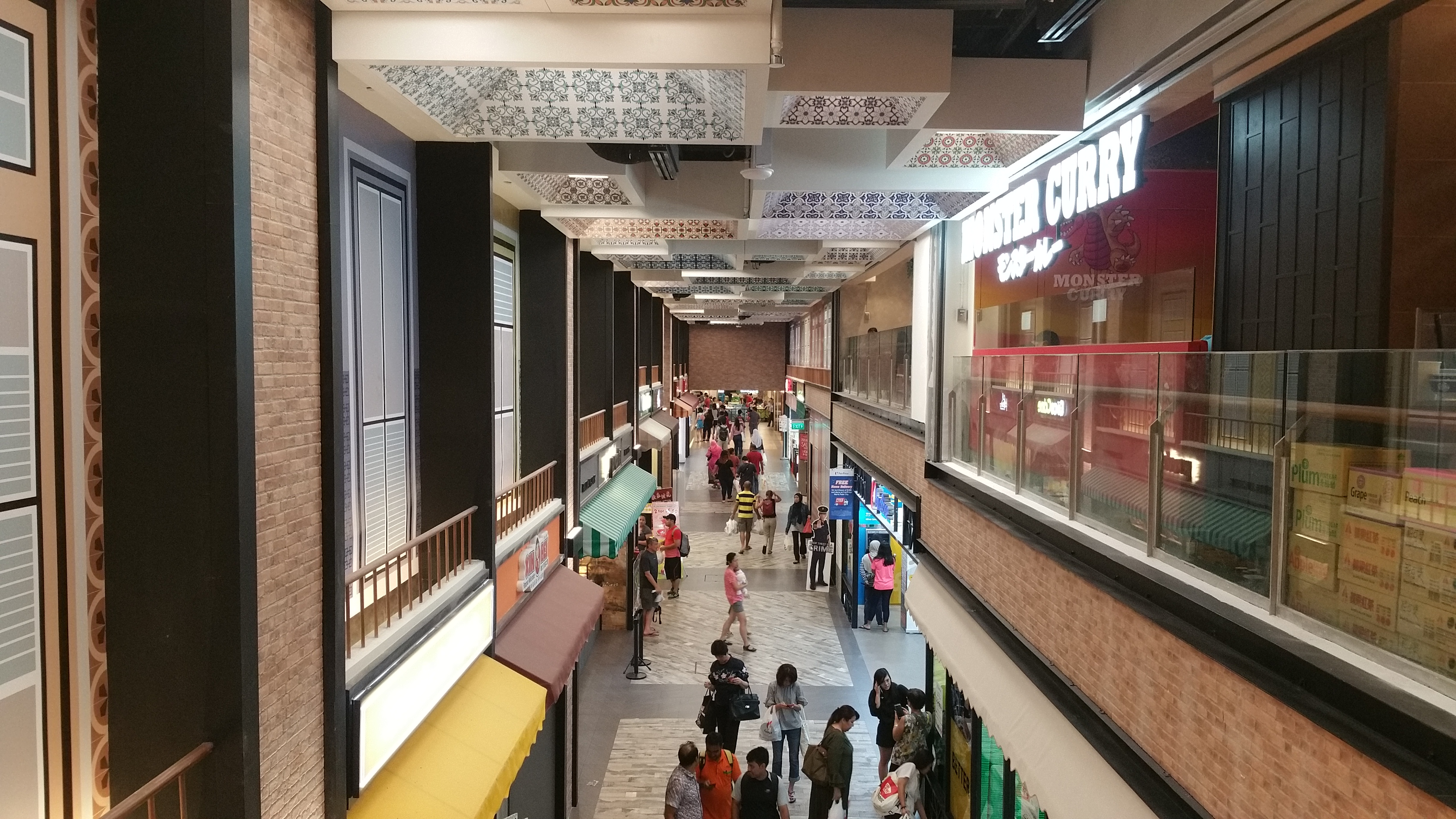
Basement 2 pathway to North Wing

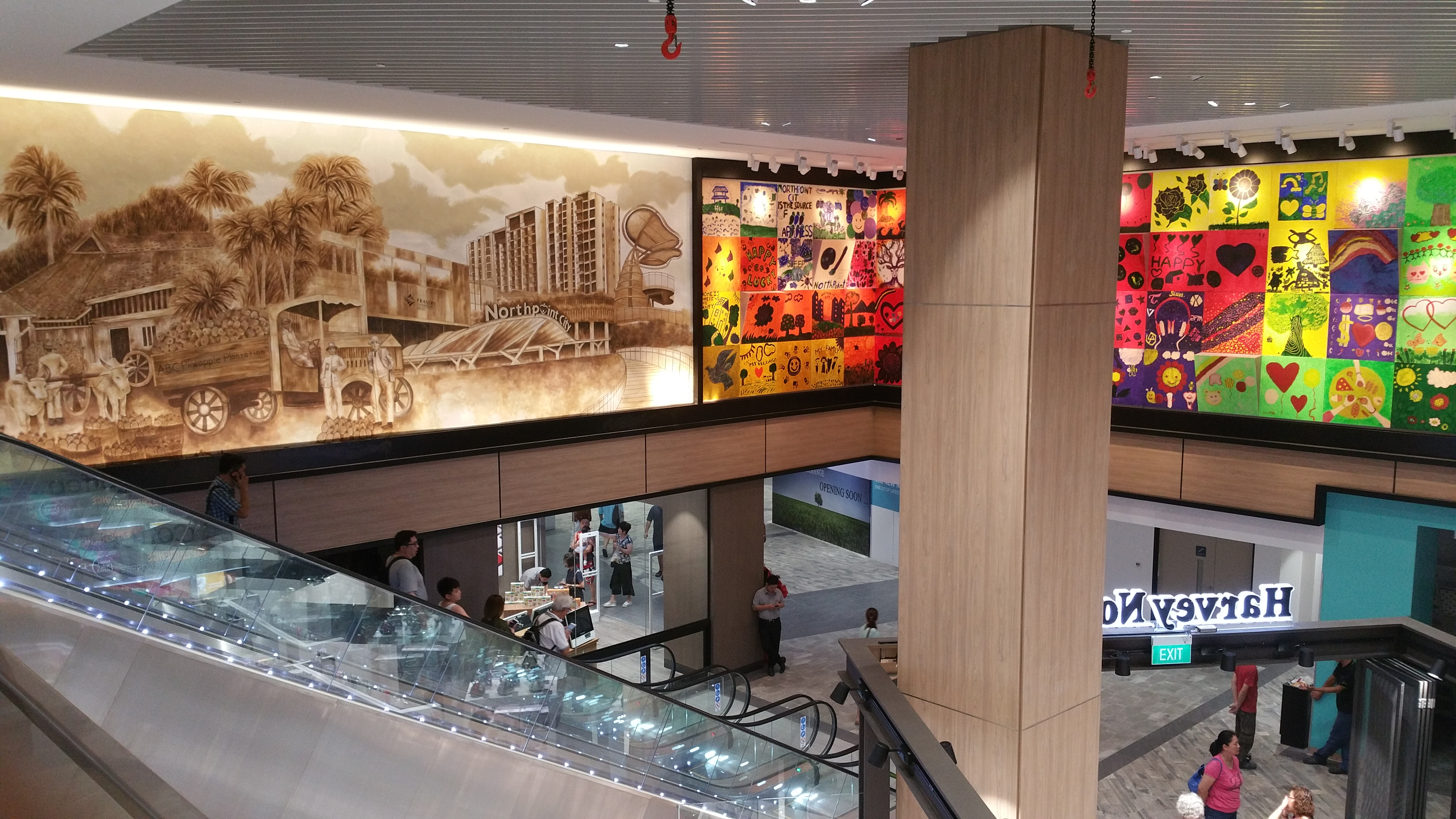
Basement 1 View of South Wing

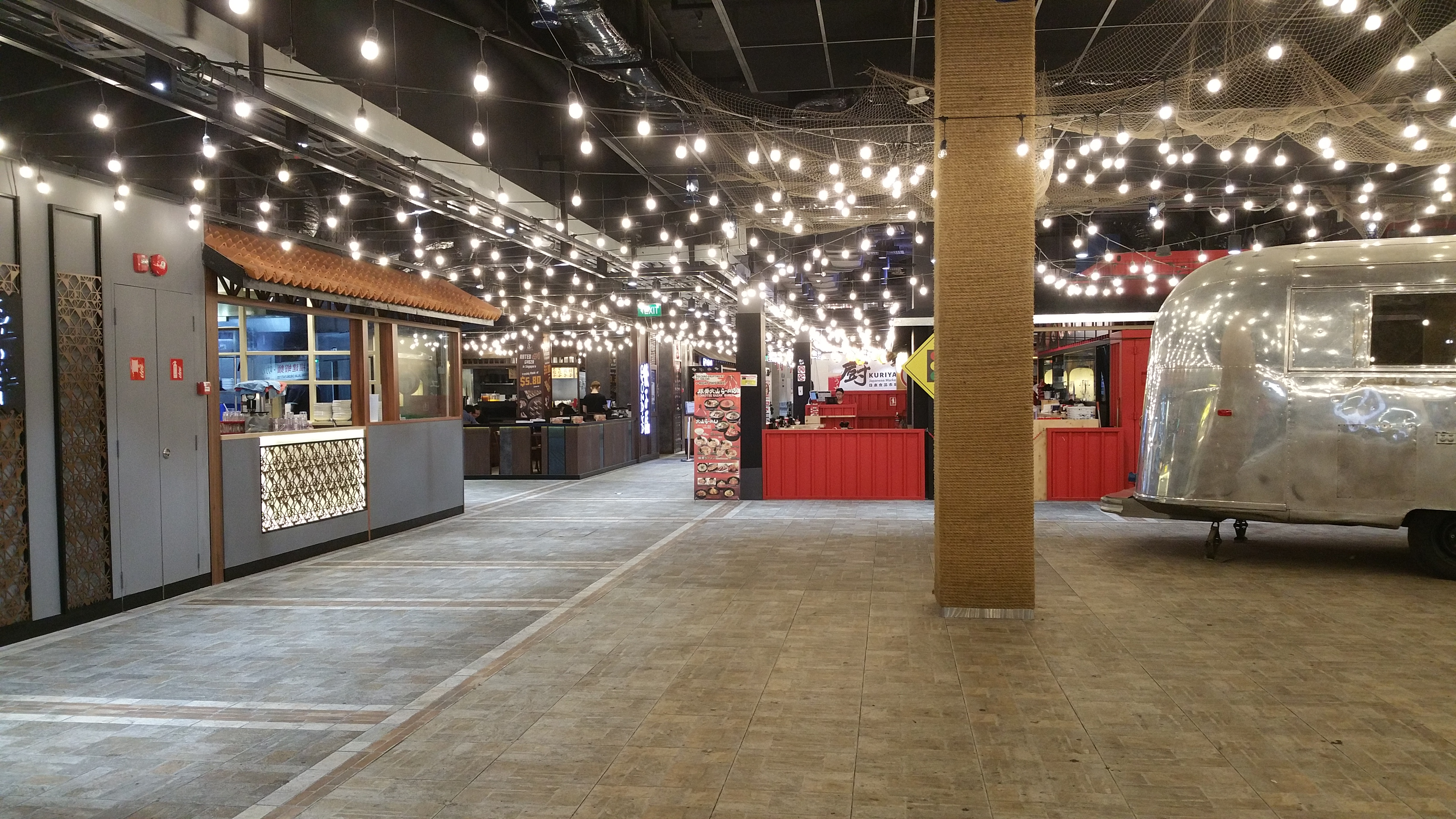
The Makan Town located at Basement 1 South Wing

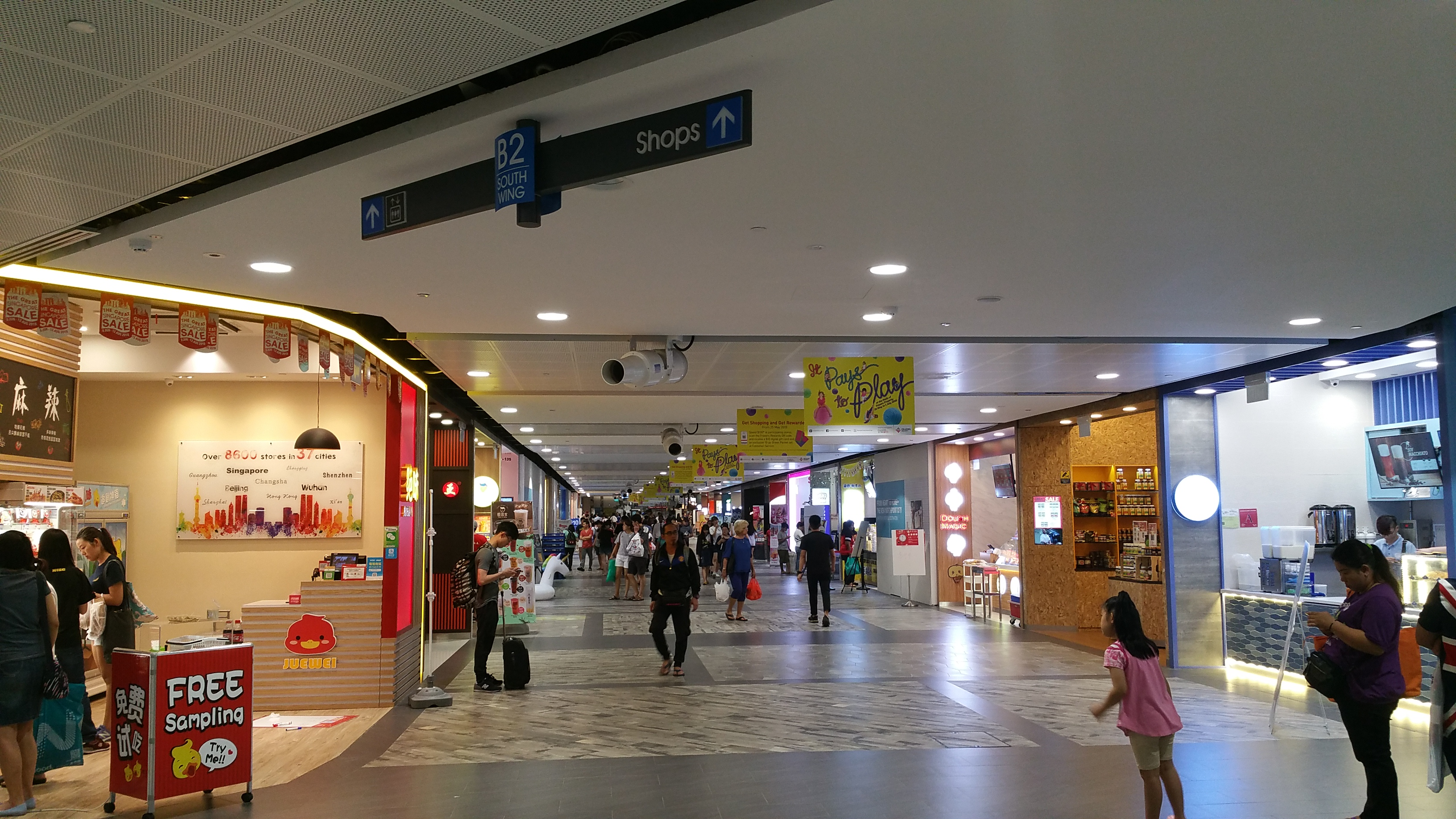
Northpoint Link which connects the South Wing to Yishun MRT station

== See also ==
- List of shopping malls in Singapore
