= Ain Husniza Saiful Nizam =

Malaysian activist

- Born: c. 2004; Malaysia
- Citizenship: Malaysia
- Occupation: Activist
- Years active: 2021 - present
- Known for: Activism on sexual harassment in schools
- Father: Saiful Nizam Abdul Wahab

Ain Husniza Saiful Nizam is a Malaysian feminist activist, most noted for her activism against rape culture in Malaysian schools. She is currently the founder and executive director of Pocket of Pink (PoP), a feminist non-government organisation.

== Activism ==
In April 2021, Husniza posted a video on TikTok and Twitter describing an incident in which her physical education teacher made a rape joke. According to Husniza, the teacher said “If you want to rape someone, make sure they are above 18.” The issue gained significant traction online in Malaysia and ignited nationwide debate about sexual harassment, misogyny, and violence in schools. Husniza went on to start the #MakeSchoolASaferPlace social movement to call attention towards rape culture in schools. Under this broader movement, other students have come forward describing their experiences. The incident was covered internationally by the BBC, Al-Jazeera, and Reuters.

Several months after the initial incident, Husniza and her family moved to a new area after facing social ostracization as a result of Husniza's activism. In December 2021, she and her father were sued by her teacher for posting the video online. They have filed a countersuit and the case is currently ongoing.
