= Anandha Kannan =

Singaporean actor (1974–2021)

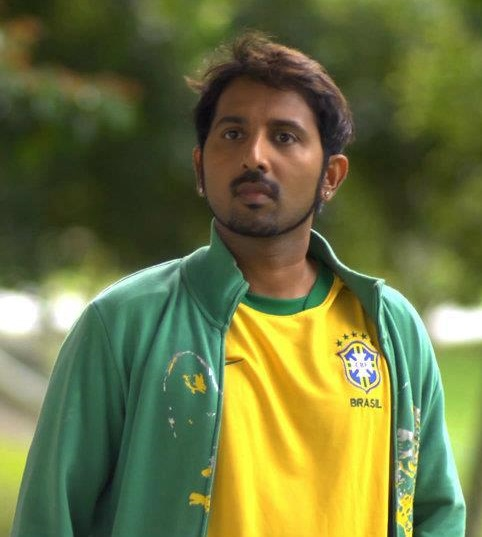
- Born: Anandha Kannan; 23 March 1974; Singapore
- Died: 16 August 2021 (aged 47); Singapore
- Occupations: Television presenter, actor,
- Spouse: Rani Kanna
- Children: 1

Anandha Kannan (23 March 1974 – 16 August 2021) was an Indian Singaporean actor and television host, popularly known for his theatre works and shows broadcast in Singapore and Sun Network.

== Early life and family ==
Anandha Kannan was born on 23 March 1973 in Singapore to Govindaraju and Vasanthakumari.

Kannan married Rani Kanna and have one daughter.

== Career ==
Kannan’s career started with Vasantham as an actor and host. During his teenage years, he acted in radio dramas like Siruvar Medai and hosted TV shows like Siruvargal Naangal. He had a keen interest in the theatre scene from a young age and became famous for performing in Ravindran Drama Group’s (RDG) productions and later in local television dramas. In 1988, his role as one of the main characters in RDG’s Kudubathin Araigal earned the appreciation of many theatergoers. He won the Best Actor Award for Indian Cultural Month in 1990. He gave the prize money to RDG to enable it to produce more plays.

Kannan moved to Chennai and joined Sun Music as a video jockey in the 2000s. It brought him fame and helped him broaden his audience base. He acted in a children’s drama called Sindubad on Sun TV which earned him many young fans. He also acted in Tamil films like the science-fiction Adhisaya Ulagam ( 2012). On Vasantham, Kannan hosted programmes such as Maalai Mathuram, Amali Thumali, Oorkuruvi and Suvai and the gameshow Savaal Singapore (2013 to 2018) which is a Tamil version of We Are Singaporeans. In 2011, he won the Best Host award at the station’s awards show Pradhana Vizha. He also received the International Youth Icon award at the World Universities Tamil Conference in 2013. With the support of the National Arts Council, Kannan went to India in 2017 to study Tamil folk theatre from the renowned teacher Na Muthuswamy.

He started AK Theatre Ltd, a non-profit organisation, in 2013 to keep Indian culture alive among the younger generation. It produces performances that celebrate traditional Tamil forms of theatre such as Koothu, karagam, kummi, parai and villupattu. He also organised cultural and language festivals, stage productions, workshops and competitions free of charge, to benefit many students of folk arts. AK Theatre launched the Anandha Koothu, a diploma course in Indian musical theatre, in affilia-tion with the University of West London in 2019 to encourage youngsters and young adults. It is an internationally accredited art enrichment programme on traditional arts and theatre forms.

He also acted as lead in Mullum Malarum with his co-host Prajin and Ithanai Naalai Engirunthai with Manochitra but both were never released to audiences. He also made guest appearance in Venkat Prabu movie Saroja. He was also famous for being brand ambassador of Naturals Spa & Salon.

== Filmography ==
Year	Film	Role	Notes
2008	Saroja		Guest appearance
2012	Adisaya Ulagam	Boo Boo	

== Television ==
Year	Title	Role	Notes
2018	Savaal Singapore - Season 5	Host (final role)	Vasantham
2017	Savaal Singapore - Season 4	Host	Vasantham
2015	Savaal Singapore - Season 3	Host	Vasantham
2014	Savaal Singapore - Season 2	Host	Vasantham
2013	Savaal Singapore - Season 1	Host	Vasantham
2012	Kadhal Channel	Vikram Raj - Lead Role	Vasantham
	Sindubad	Sindubad - Lead Role	Sun TV

== Awards and recognitions ==
- Awarded as "International Youth Icon" at World Universities Tamil Conference 2013.
- Television Actors Guild Award (South India) for "Best Actor"
- Tamil Sudar Award, AK Theatre Limited, Awarded by Mediacorp 2019

Awards & Recognition at Pradhana Vizha as follows,

Year	Award	Nominated work	Result
2011	Best Host (Info-Ed)	Savaal Singapore	Won
2014	Best Host - Variety	Savaal Singapore	Nominated
2016	Best Host (Info-Ed)	Savaal Singapore	Nominated
2018	Best Host (Info-Ed)	Savaal Singapore	Nominated

== Death ==
Anandha Kannan died at the Singapore General Hospital on 16 August 2021 at the age of 47 due to bile-duct cancer & bladder cancer.
