= Kenneth Gin Ying Doon =

Singaporean civil engineer (1924–2021)

Kenneth Gin Ying Doon, PPA(P), PBM (3 December 1924 – 15 October 2021) was a civil engineer in Singapore who was elected as the first President of the Institution of Engineers, Singapore. He practised as a Civil Engineer from 1946 to 2000. He was deputy director of Public Works in 1959; acting director of Public Works; General Manager of Public Utilities; Group Manager of Singapore Land & Investment Co Ltd; General Manager of Sentosa Development Corporation. He was a member of the International Chamber of Commerce's International Tribunal as an Arbitrator and was elected as a Fellow of the Institution of Engineers, Australia since 1962; a Fellow of Civil Engineers, UK since 1965 and chairman of the advisory board to the Institution of Civil Engineers beginning in 1968. In August 1963, he received the Public Administration Medal (Silver) Award.

== Early life and education ==
Gin was born in Australia on 3 December 1924 as the third youngest of twelve siblings to Hoey Sing Goon and Woo Choy Yeuck. He had 5 brothers and 6 sisters.

Hoey was the second eldest of three brothers and migrated to Melbourne, Australia from Sun Woy, Kwantung, China. He opened a general store trading in Chinese groceries and artifacts, silks and ivories in Little Bourke Street, Melbourne's renowned Chinatown. Hoey would meet Woo, the daughter of a practicing herbalist across the street, whom he soon married. They subsequently moved to Hopetoun Road.

Hoey died after a second stroke after his twelve child was born and the family business fell on two of his sons. With his two siblings running the family business, Gin managed to study at Melbourne High School in South Yarra, Melbourne from 1939 to 1941 where he excelled in mathematics and physics. He then went on to be the only child in the family to attend university. Gin graduated with Honours in Civil Engineering from the University of Melbourne in 1945.

== Engineering career ==
=== Messrs, Scott & Furphy (1946 to 1955) ===
From graduating in 1945 to 1955, he worked in the consulting firm Messrs, Scott & Furphy specializing in water supply, sewerage, drainage and municipal works. Gin established the Launceston Branch Office in 1949 and was the Tasmanian Branch Manager until 1952. He worked on the North Esk Regional Water Scheme project involving river headworks, a tunnel spanning 43 miles of trunk water mains, gravity mains (a building-drainage system which drains by gravity into a building's sewer system) as well as a service reservoir, two pumping stations and rising mains (vertical pipes that rise from the ground to supply mains water to a building). After 1952, he returned to Melbourne as a Senior Engineer at the firm where we worked under the purview of one of the firm's partners on directed labour for water supply, sewerage schemes, roads and municipal works.

=== Hume Industries (Far East) Ltd. (1955 to 1959) ===
In June 1955, Gin made plans to move to Singapore for work. The Australian Commissioner to Malaya (now called the Commissioner to Singapore) Claude Massey wrote in recommending Gin to Singapore's Ministry of Foreign Affairs.

In 1956, Gin moved to Singapore (then part of the Federation of Malaya) and was employed by Hume Industries (Far East) as a Project Engineer. He led the design and supervised the manufacturing of prestressed concrete beams (PSC beams) and piles at factories and work sites. This led him to work on erecting bridges ad designing steel buildings in Singapore and was the site engineer for manufacturing the PSC beams found in Merdeka Bridge. Gin left Hume Industries in 1959 to join Singapore's Public Works, now the current Public Utilities Board (PUB).

=== Public Works (1959 to 1969) ===
During Singapore's pre-independence years, Singapore had to take a US$600 million loan from the World Bank for infrastructure development. The World Bank approved the loan on one condition, that Gin would oversee the projects that the loan would fund and so in 1959, Gin joined Singapore's Public Works as deputy director. His staff consisted of 70 engineers, 30 architects and a further 4,800 in labour strength. His task was to develop and maintain a young Singapore's roads, highways, sewerage, drainage, schools, hospitals and public buildings, airport and other works. It was during this period that the Pan Island Expressway (an island long expressway connecting the west and east side of Singapore) and the Mass Rapid Transit System (Singapore's first metro system) were initiated. In 1962, Gin was appointed to acting director of Public Works and also took on projects on Singapore's traffic planning. In 1966, Public Works was renamed to the current Public Utilities Board of Singapore (PUB). That same year, Gin was appointed as General Manager of PUB and developed Singapore's electrical grid, power generation, water supply and treatment works, gas production and distribution for a population that had risen to over 2 million. Under his leadership, PUB also grew in size to 140 professional engineers, with a total labour strength of 7,500 and together they built the new Jurong Power Station and the Kota Tinggi Waterworks in Johor Bahru.

Gin left Public Works in 1969 when his contract finished.

=== Singapore Land & Investment Co. Ltd. (1970 to 1972) ===
Beginning in 1970, Gin became the Group General Manager of the Singapore where he had a hand in office and residential development as well as hotel extensions. His investigations and work looked into possible land developments and management of Singapore Land properties. In 1970, he was an expert witness at a court case re allegation of the supply of sub-standard asbestos cement pipes to the Public Works Department of Malaysia. In 1971, Gin had his first taste of Arbitration in Engineering Disputes as sole Arbitrator for a contractor's claim for SGD$375,000 (SGD$1.4 million which is US$1.03 million in today's money) for additional work from a Singaporean Statutory Board. He was the over-all in charge of the construction of the Cuscaden House Hotel extension to 140 rooms, the Woolerton Park Development of 30 houses and 72 flats and the initial design for the Clifford Centre, a 29-story building of 550,000 sq.ft. in gross area located in Singapore's Central Business District.

=== Sentosa Development Corporation (1973 to 1975) ===
In 1973, Gin became the General Manager of Sentosa Development Corporation, a government statutory board. He was in charge of the development of the island off the south coast of Singapore's Central Area, Sentosa. Originally known as Pulau Blakang Mati, the island was once used as a British base and a Japanese prisoner-of-war camp during World War II before it was renamed and slated for development as a popular tourist destination in 1972. Once a small hilly island covered in tropical rainforest, it has now become a popular tourist attraction of Singapore that receives more than 20 million visitors a year. Gin's work covered infrastructural works such as roads, sewerage, drainage, utility supplies, gun museum, monorail system, the first 18-hole golf course on the island, a 0.8 mile long lagoon and a Coralarium. The Coralarium complex was the first such attraction in Asia and its main building had a 18-metre-tall coralon tower with another building housing a 60-metre-long continuous display corridor of various corals and seashells. It was opened in 1974 but its coralon tower was dismantled in 1983 due to safety concerns over its structural stability.

=== Consultant Engineer (1976 to 2000) ===
After 1975, Gin set up his own consulting engineer practice. In 1978, he was the project director for the Australian consulting engineering firm of Kuttner Collins International where he was in charge of an international project team on the Railway Feasibility Study for the Malaysian Government. From 1979 to 2000, Gin continued with his own consulting engineer practice and his main projects were for Mobil Oil Singapore Pte Ltd (current ExxonMobil in Singapore). He worked on oil refinery projects for Mobil Oil Singapore totalling US$1.88 billion (which is US$6.6 billion) in assets including a Continuous Catalytic Reformer for creating blending stocks for high-octane gasoline from naphthas distilled from crude oil. Other projects included a residual upgrading project in 1980, a Merox Unit in 1980, a hydrocracker in 1981, a 1 million barrel storage tank at Pulau Pesek in 1981, an 11,000 Bbl (oil barrel) liquid petroleum gas sphere in 1987, a US$1.05 billion continuous catalytic converter in 1991 and a lube base oil project in 1995. These projects were located on the cluster of islands that were joined by land reclamation (which completed in 2009) to become Jurong Island, Singapore's largest industrial complex whose refineries process 1,300,000 barrels of crude oil daily. Meanwhile, the ExxonMobil petrochemical complex eventually became the company's largest integrated refining and petrochemical complex in the world.

=== Arbitration (1976 to 2000) ===
While working as a consultant engineer, Gin also acted as an Arbitrator, expert witness and as a source of engineering opinion in many engineering disputes in Singapore and the region. In 1976, Gin worked on a dredging contractor's claim for US$4.9 million (which is US$22 million in today's money) from a Singaporean Statutory Board. In 1977, he worked on a re allegation of professional negligence and quantum of fees on abandonment of work by clients in Singapore. From 1977 to 1978 he was also an expert witness for a dredging contractor's claim against a main contractor for additional work. In 1979, Gin was appointed to be a member of the International Chamber of Commerce International Tribunal as an Arbitrator.

In 1979, he arbitrated a sub-contractor's claim against an internal contractor for US$2.98 million (which is US$10.5 million in today's money). In 1984, he arbitrated a glass producer's insurance claim against a collective of insurance companies with a full award of US$1.4 million ( which is US$3.4 million in today's money). In 1988, he was the sole arbitrator at a civil engineering contractor's claim for US$1.18 million (US$2.55 million in today's money) against a shipyard. In 1995, he was the sole arbitrator at a contractor's claim for US$543,000 (US$0.9 million in today's money) for variations on building work and was able to attain a private settlement with 3 days of hearings.

From 1996 to 1997, Gin acted as an expert witness for a major insurance company for claims for severe damage to private houses and a major earth embankment failure. In 1997, Gin was the sole arbitrator for a piling sub-contractor's claim against a developer for alleged wrongful termination of contract. In 1998, Gin was the sole arbitrator for a developer's claim for US$600,000 for liquidated damages opposed by a contractor counter claiming of unpaid work, loss of profit and return of performance bond monies.

From 1998 to 1999, Gin was a co-arbitrator for a US$12 million (US$18.8 million in today's money) claim for additional professional fees for extra work outside the scope of a major consultancy contract. In April 1999 he was the sole arbitrator for a sub-contractors claim for US$662,000 (US$1.02 million in today's money) from a main contractor for variation works. He arbitrated a mutual settlement after a partial hearing of 5 days.

Gin was a council member in the Singapore Institute of Arbitrators in 1981, 1982, 1985 and 1986. In 1987, he became the President of the Singapore Institute of Arbitrators. In 1993, he was appointed as a member of the Panel of Accredited Arbitrators by the Singapore International Arbitration Centre and in 1997 was further appointed to the Panel of Mediators by the Singapore Mediation Centre.

== Personal life ==
Gin met Wee Kit Lee on a fishing boat in when both of them were studying in University of Melbourne. Wee knew one of Gin's sisters and was invited by her to join for a fishing trip.

Gin married Wee in 1956 at Wesley Church and they had three children.

Gin died on 15 October 2021, at the age of 96.

== Awards and memberships ==
In 1963, Gin was awarded the Pingat Pentadbiran Awam (Public Administration Medal) - Silver for his work in Singapore's Public Service.

From 1964 to 1966 Gin was also President of the Board of Architects, Singapore and from was also a member of the Master Plan and Building Control Committees and Industrial Facilities Committee of the Economic Development Board of Singapore. July 1966, Gin founded the Institution of Engineers, Singapore and was its first President from 1966 to 1968. Additionally, from 1967 to 1968, he was a member of the Jurong Town Corporation (Singapore's state owned real estate company) and from 1964 to 1967 was a member of the People's Association of Singapore (a statutory board that oversees neighbourhood grassroots communities and social organisations). From October 1972 to 1997, Gin also held the position of Chairman of the Advisory Committee to the Institution of Civil Engineers in Singapore. He was a member since 1966. From 1968 to 1987, he was Convener of the Membership Committee in Singapore for the Institution of Engineers, Australia. In 1967, he was chairman of the Singapore delegation to the World Power Conference in Tokyo, Japan. In 1968, he was chairman of the 11th session of the sub-committee on Energy Resources and Electric Power held in Singapore. In 1975, he was senior vice-president of the Metropolitan Young Men Christians Association (YMCA) in Singapore. From 1979 to 1983, he was the director of International Mapping Co. Pte. Ltd.

From 1988 onward, Gin became a member of the Strata Titles Board of Singapore.
