= Saw Swee Hock =

Singaporean statistician and philanthropist (1931–2021)

Saw Swee Hock HFLSE (Chinese: 蘇瑞福; Pe̍h-ōe-jī: So͘ Sūi-hok; sometimes written Saw Swee-Hock) (1931 – 16 February 2021) was a Singaporean leading expert in statistics, population, and economics, and was a noted philanthropist.

== Education ==
Saw received his BA in 1956 and MA in 1960 from the University of Malaya in Singapore, now the National University of Singapore (NUS). He earned his PhD in statistics from the London School of Economics (LSE) in 1963.

== Career ==
He began his academic career at the University of Malaya in Kuala Lumpur (1963-1969). He subsequently became founding professor of statistics at the University of Hong Kong (1969-1971) and professor of statistics at NUS (1975-1991). He was a professorial fellow at the Institute of Southeast Asian Studies in Singapore and a member of the NUS board of trustees.

Saw has been a member of more than 30 advisory panels and committees, including the United Nations Committee on Salary Adjustments and the International Statistical Institute, and was the first chairman of the National Statistical Commission of Singapore. He has held visiting positions in, among others, Princeton, Stanford, Cambridge and LSE. He has written or edited 49 books, 31 book chapters and over 110 articles on statistics, demography and economics.

== Philanthropy ==
Saw was also known for his philanthropy. He was named one of the "48 Heroes of Philanthropy" in the Asia-Pacific Region by Forbes Asia Magazine in 2014. His largest reported donation was of US$24 million in 2011 to his alma mater, NUS, to establish the Saw Swee Hock School of Public Health. He also contributed £2 million to his other alma mater, LSE, for the student centre building that bears his name and also supported the Saw Swee Hock Southeast Asia Centre. He has made contributions to universities in Singapore, China, Hong Kong and the UK. His family made its money by investing in bungalows, in part with an inheritance from his businessman father-in-law.

Swee Hock’s contributions to the field of education include an endowment in 2004 to establish 12 annual bursaries for students studying for MBAs. He has also endowed several professorships at NUS including a donation in 2002 for the establishment of the Saw Swee Hock Professor of Statistics in the Department of Statistics and Applied Probability at NUS.

In 2016, Saw established the Saw Swee Hock Study Award at Yale-NUS College with three students from the Class of 2018 as recipients of the inaugural award.

== Honors and awards ==
Saw has been awarded numerous honors in recognition of his academic achievements and his philanthropy. He was named honorary professor of Statistics at the University of Hong Kong, honorary professor at Xiamen University, and President's Honorary Professor of Statistics at NUS. He was made an honorary fellow at LSE and an honorary university fellow of the University of Hong Kong. He was conferred the Outstanding Service Award by NUS, the Singapore President's Award for Philanthropy, and the Public Service Medal by the Singapore Government in 2013. In 2015, he was conferred the Honorary Doctor of Letters by NUS and the Distinguished Alumni Leadership Award by LSE.

== Personal life ==
He was married to Dr. Cheng Siok-Hwa, who was a faculty member of the Department of History at NUS and has published numerous books in her own right; the couple also co-authored various publications. They had two daughters and one son.
