= Yishun Bus Interchange =

Bus interchange in Yishun, Singapore

Yishun Bus Interchange 义顺巴士转换站 Pusat Pertukaran Bas Yishun
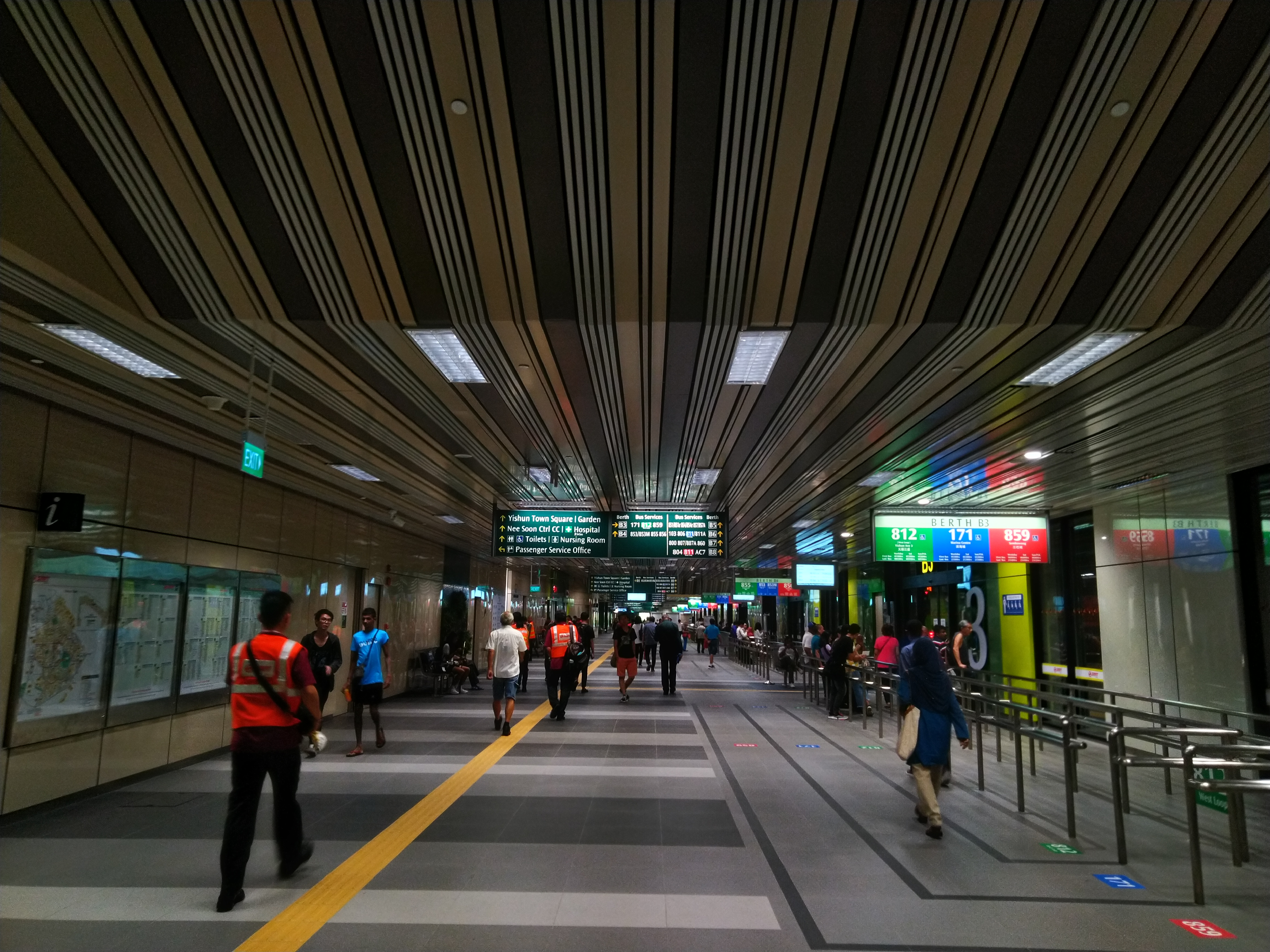
- Interior of Yishun Bus Interchange.

General information
- Location: 920 Yishun Avenue 2, Singapore 769100
- System: Public bus interchange
- Owner: Land Transport Authority
- Operator: Tower Transit Singapore
- Bus routes: 9 (Tower Transit Singapore); 13 (SBS Transit); 2 (Go-Ahead Singapore); 1 (Ridewell Travel)
- Bus stands: 4 Alighting Berths; 8 Boarding Berths
- Bus operators: Tower Transit Singapore; SBS Transit; Go-Ahead Singapore; Ridewell Travel
- Connections: NS13 Yishun

Construction
- Structure type: At-grade
- Accessible: Accessible alighting/boarding points Accessible public toilets Graduated kerb edges Tactile guidance system

History
- Opened: 23 August 1987; 39 years ago (Old); 14 March 2015; 11 years ago (Temporary); 8 September 2019; 7 years ago (Integrated Transport Hub)
- Closed: 13 March 2015; 11 years ago (Old); 7 September 2019; 7 years ago (Temporary)

Key dates
- 23 August 1987: Commenced operations
- 14 March 2015: Operations transferred to temporary bus interchange
- 8 September 2019: Operations transferred to new and air-conditioned bus interchange as Integrated Transport Hub
Location

Yishun Bus Interchange is an air-conditioned bus interchange located at Yishun Town Centre, serving residential areas around Yishun and Khatib. It is the tenth air-conditioned bus interchange in Singapore, integrated within the Northpoint City shopping centre (South Wing) and North Park Residences condominium, while seamlessly connected to Yishun MRT station via an underpass at Basement 2. Nearby public amenities including Golden Village Yishun, Nee Soon Sports Centre, Yishun Polyclinic, Yishun Pond Park, and Nee Soon East Community Centre. Yishun Integrated Transport Hub opened on Sunday, 8 September 2019, with SMRT Buses being the anchor operator. As the tendered package awarded operator for the Sembawang–Yishun Bus Package, Tower Transit is the current anchor operator from 5 September 2021. It also replaces the Yishun's temporary bus interchange which has replaced the previous interchange since 14 March 2015.

== History ==
=== Previous sites ===
In the early days of Yishun New Town, bus terminals were operated from both Yishun Avenue 5 Bus Terminal, Yishun Central Bus Terminal, as well as the Mandai Road Bus Terminal. Feeder buses usually comes from Yishun Central Bus Terminal whereas trunk buses usually came from Yishun Avenue 5 Bus Terminal. Before the opening, Mandai Road Bus Terminal was closed and operations shifted to Yishun Avenue 5 Bus Terminal. The original Yishun Bus Interchange was built at a cost of S$2 million, and it opened on 23 August 1987. The numbering was "80x" and "81x" for all feeder services and "85x" for all trunk services. New services were only tendered to Trans-Island Bus Services (TIBS) and was the first and only bus interchange purpose-built for the Trans-Island Bus Service that prevents double decker buses from entering the interchange.

All bus routes were packaged under Yishun Bus Package since 1995. Service 171 was mandated to be under TIBS, with the exception of bus service 39 and 85, which were introduced by SBS Transit after 2001.

=== Temporary bus interchange ===
The shops at Block 923 were closed and subsequently demolished in 2012 due to the development plans. Residents who were residing at Block 923 were transferred to a new residential area.

On 17 June 2013, the Housing and Development Board (HDB) released the land parcel where the former interchange and then-demolished HDB flat, Block 923, which was located there. The land parcel was launched for sale on 28 June 2013.

As such, in 2014, Yishun bus package were redrawn into Sembawang-Yishun bus package and Seletar bus package respectively. All feeder services, as well as selected trunk buses were moved to Seletar bus package and trunk services joined all services in Sembawang and a few services in Woodlands to be under Sembawang-Yishun bus package.

On 27 February 2015, the Land Transport Authority (LTA) announced the construction and co-location of a new air-conditioned bus interchange with the new Northpoint City integrated development, named the Yishun Integrated Transport Hub (YITH). The new interchange is slated to open in 2019. The integrated bus interchange will be linked to the existing Yishun MRT station by a new underpass underneath Yishun Avenue 2.

As such, to make way for a new Integrated Transport Hub (ITH), the old bus interchange transferred operations to a temporary site at the junction of Yishun Central and Yishun Central 1 behind Northpoint Shopping Centre on 14 March 2015. The last bus service to leave the old interchange, Service 812, departed at 12:45am, 14 March 2015. This temporary interchange was closed on 7 September 2019 and the new Yishun ITH opened on 8 September 2019.

== Bus contracting model ==
Under the bus contracting model, all bus services operating from Yishun Bus Interchange were divided into five bus packages, operated by three different bus operators.

From 5 September 2021, Yishun Bus Interchange is operated by Tower Transit on a five-year term.

=== List of bus services ===
Operator	Package	Service	Berth	Destination	Remarks
Go-Ahead Singapore	Loyang	85	B2	Punggol	—N/a
Go-Ahead Singapore	Loyang	85A	B2	Sengkang East Road (Sengkang Community Hub)	Short trip service
Go-Ahead Singapore	Tampines	39	B2	Tampines Concourse	—N/a
SBS Transit	Seletar	800	B7	↺ Sembawang Road	—N/a
SBS Transit	Seletar	803	B1	↺ Yishun Avenue 6	—N/a
SBS Transit	Seletar	804	B8	↺ Yishun Avenue 11	—N/a
SBS Transit	Seletar	805	B2	↺ Yishun Avenue 1	—N/a
SBS Transit	Seletar	806	B6	↺ Yishun Avenue 6	—N/a
SBS Transit	Seletar	807	B7	↺ Yishun Avenue 5	—N/a
SBS Transit	Seletar	807A	B7	Yishun Ring Road (Khatib Station Exit D)	Short trip service
SBS Transit	Seletar	807B	B7	Yishun Ring Road (Jiemin Pr Sch)	Short trip service
SBS Transit	Seletar	811/811T	B6	↺ Yishun Avenue 5	North Loop
SBS Transit	Seletar	811A	B6	Yishun Avenue 5 (Opp Yishun Station Exit B)	Short trip service
SBS Transit	Seletar	812/812T	B1	↺ Yishun Avenue 4	East Loop
SBS Transit	Seletar	812/812T	B3	↺ Yishun Avenue 3	West Loop
SBS Transit	Seletar	851	B5	Bukit Merah	—N/a
SBS Transit	Seletar	851e	B5	New Bridge Road (Aft Duxton Plain Pk)	Express service
SBS Transit	Seletar	852	B1	Bukit Batok	—N/a
SBS Transit	Seletar	860	B7	Yio Chu Kang	—N/a
SBS Transit	Serangoon–Eunos	103 (Until June 2027)	B6	Serangoon	—N/a
SMRT Buses	Serangoon–Eunos	103 (From June 2027)	B6	Serangoon	—N/a
Tower Transit Singapore	Sembawang–Yishun	171	B3	↺ Upper Bukit Timah Road	—N/a
Tower Transit Singapore	Sembawang–Yishun	801	B8	↺ Yishun Avenue 1	—N/a
Tower Transit Singapore	Sembawang–Yishun	853	B4	Lorong 1 Geylang	Weekdays & Saturdays
Tower Transit Singapore	Sembawang–Yishun	853M	B4	Upper East Coast	Sundays / Public holidays
Tower Transit Singapore	Sembawang–Yishun	854	B5	Bedok	—N/a
Tower Transit Singapore	Sembawang–Yishun	854e	B5	Bedok	Express service / Weekdays morning peak
Tower Transit Singapore	Sembawang–Yishun	855	B4	HarbourFront	—N/a
Tower Transit Singapore	Sembawang–Yishun	856	B4	Woodlands	—N/a
Tower Transit Singapore	Sembawang–Yishun	857	B5	↺ Temasek Avenue	—N/a
Tower Transit Singapore	Sembawang–Yishun	857A	B5	Yio Chu Kang Road (Opp Sunrise Gdns)	Short trip service
Tower Transit Singapore	Sembawang–Yishun	857B	B5	Temasek Avenue (Aft Promenade Station Exit C)	Short trip service
Tower Transit Singapore	Sembawang–Yishun	859	B3	Sembawang	—N/a
