= Stanley Street, Singapore =

Street in Chinatown, Singapore

Coordinates: 1.2800°N 103.8479°E

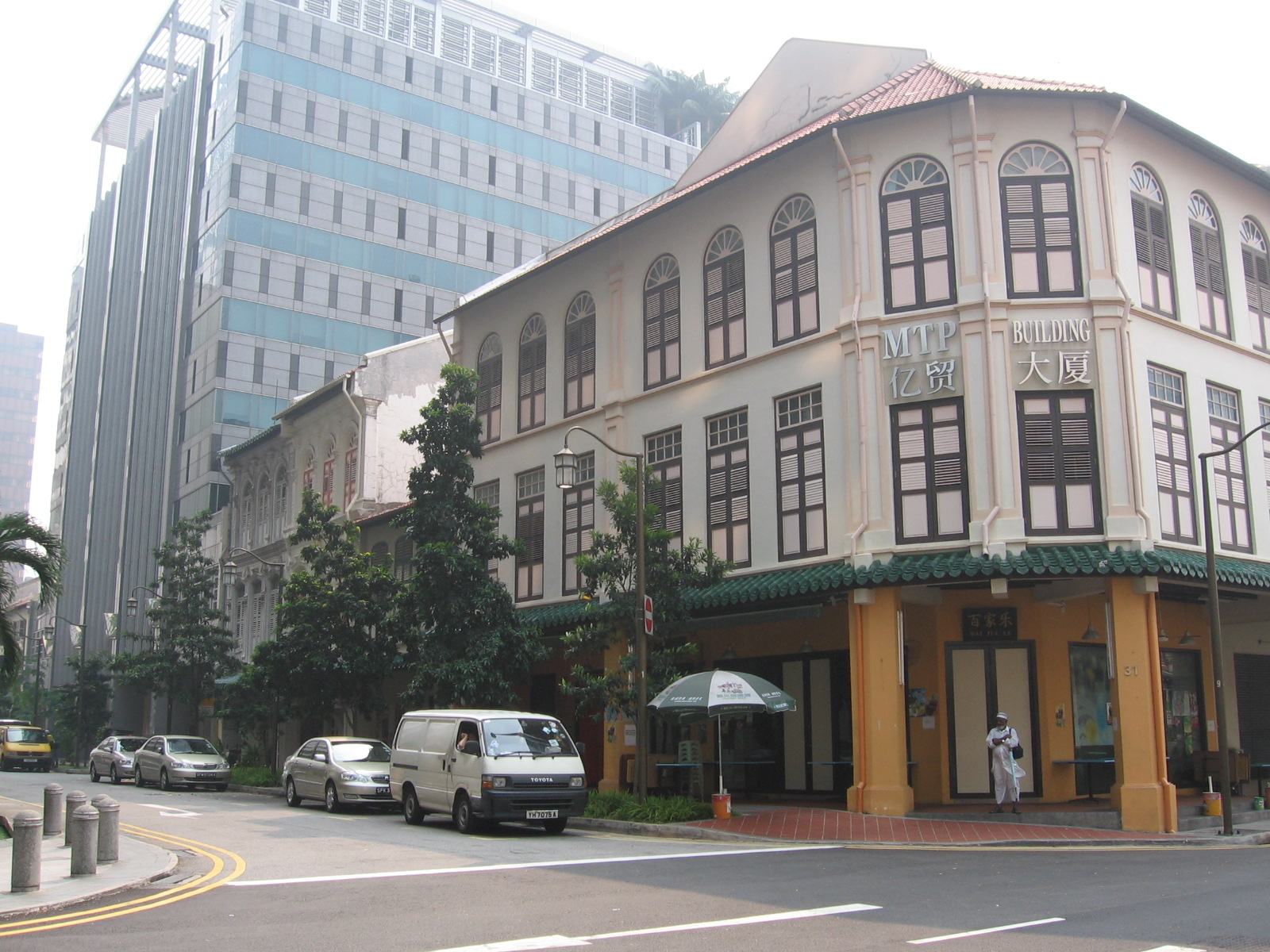
Stanley Street in Chinatown, Singapore.

Stanley Street (Chinese: 史坦利街) is a one-way street in the Telok Ayer area of Chinatown, Singapore. It lies on the boundary between the Downtown Core and Outram Planning Area. The street links McCallum Street to Boon Tat Street. On the left side of the street, it is mainly conserved shophouses and on the right, car park entrances to Cecil Street buildings. The Singapore Hokkien Huay Kuan is located on this street.
