= Yishun MRT station =

Mass Rapid Transit station in Singapore

Yishun NS13 义顺 யீஷூன்
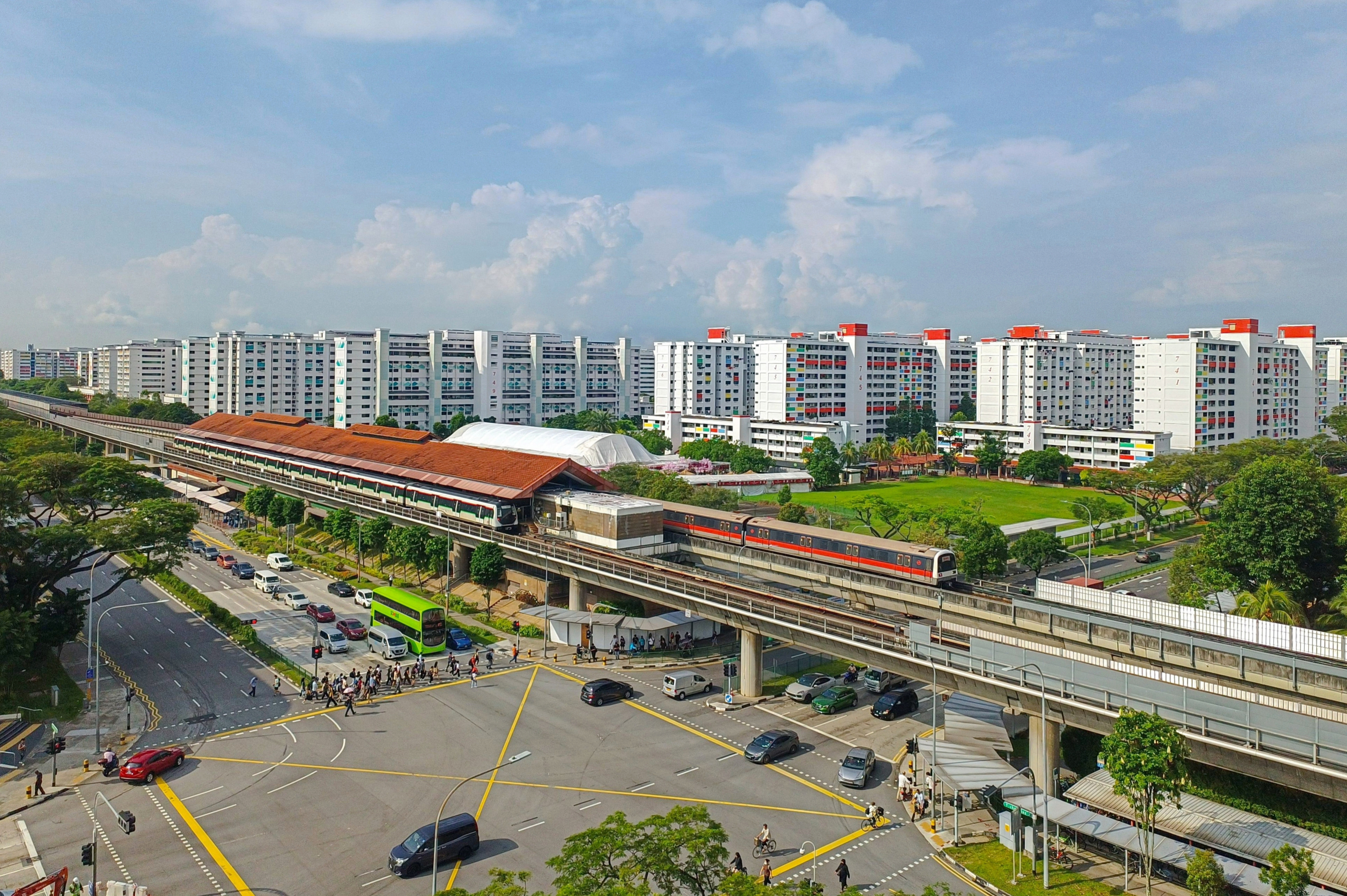
- The exterior of Yishun MRT station.

General information
- Location: 301 Yishun Avenue 2, Singapore 769093
- Coordinates: 01°25′46.07″N 103°50′06.86″E
- System: Mass Rapid Transit (MRT) station
- Owner: Land Transport Authority
- Operator: SMRT Trains
- Line: North–South Line
- Platforms: 2 (1 island platform)
- Tracks: 2
- Connections: Yishun, Taxi

Construction
- Structure type: Elevated
- Platform levels: 1
- Parking: Yes (Northpoint City, GV Yishun)
- Accessible: Yes

Other information
- Station code: YIS

History
- Opened: 20 December 1988; 37 years ago
- Former names: Nee Soon North

Passengers
- June 2024: 48,649 per day

Services
Preceding station	Mass Rapid Transit	Following station
Canberra towards Jurong East	North–South Line	Khatib towards Marina South Pier
Track layout
Location
- Location within Singapore Rail

Yishun MRT station (/ˈiːʃuːn/ EE-shoon) is an above-ground Mass Rapid Transit (MRT) station on the North–South Line (NSL) in Yishun, Singapore. The station is located at the junction of Yishun Avenue 2 and Yishun Avenue 5, and is currently one of the two MRT stations that serve Yishun New Town; the other being Khatib station.

Yishun station was the terminus of the NSL upon its completion on 20 December 1988, until the Woodlands Extension of the NSL was completed and opened on 10 February 1996.

== History ==
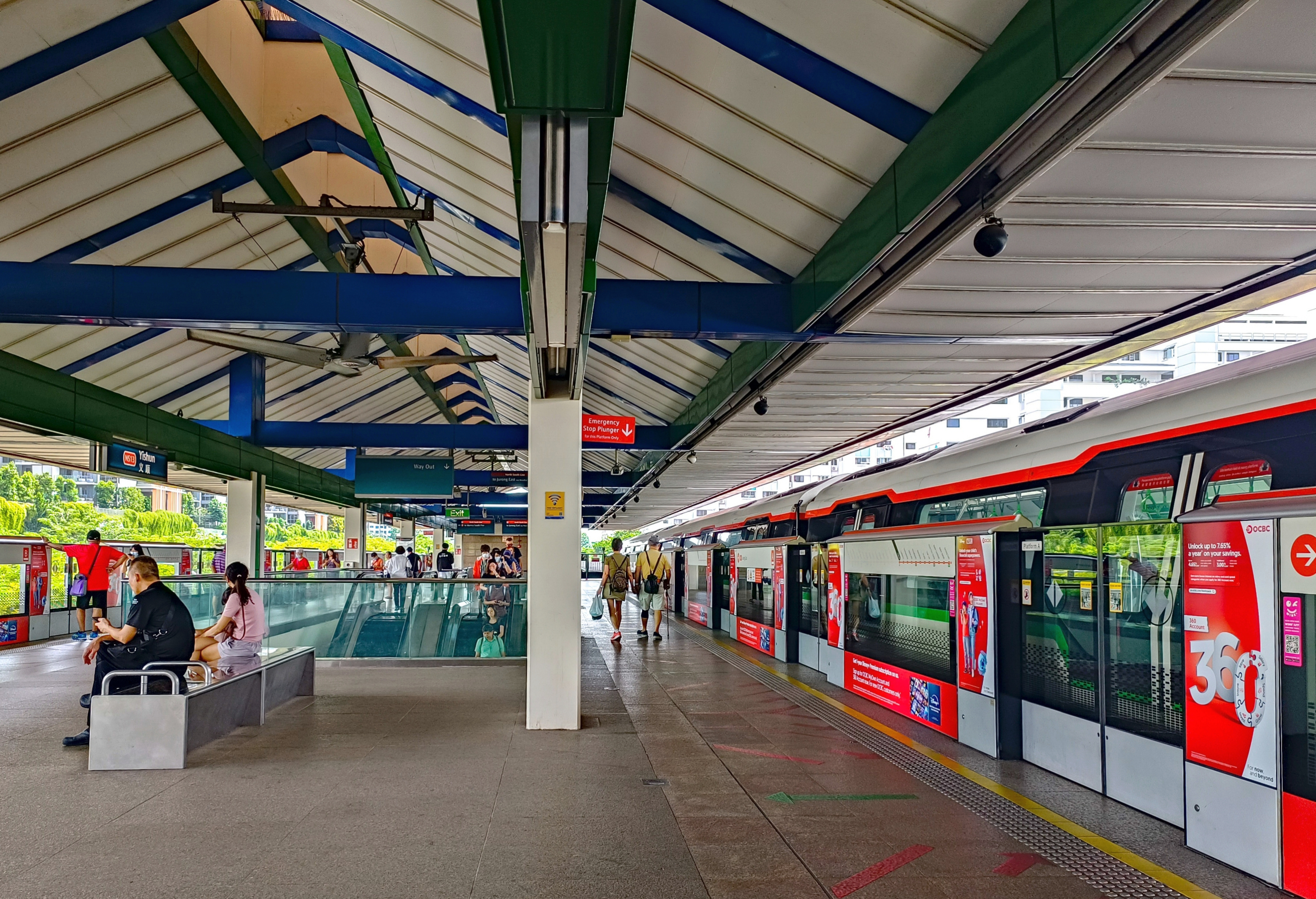
Platform level of Yishun station.

Yishun opened on 20 December 1988, two years earlier than planned. During the start of construction in December 1984, Nee Soon North― the original name of the station― was renamed to Yishun.

Contract 402 consists of viaducts between Yio Chu Kang and Yishun, as well as the Sembawang (now Khatib) and Yishun stations, was awarded to a French company, GTM Coignet, in November 1985.

Yishun station was one of the first three stations (Note: The other stations are Jurong East and Pasir Ris stations) to undergo testing as to whether the platform screen doors were viable for elevated stations. Eventually, installation of the half-height platform screen doors started on 26 August 2009 and operations commenced on 2 December that year. Half-height screen doors have been installed in all elevated stations since. Yishun station also have high-volume low-speed fans installed, which started operations since 27 June 2012.

Yishun station was also the first batch of ten stations (Note: The other stations are: Admiralty, Aljunied, Boon Lay, Chinese Garden, Lakeside, Sembawang, Sengkang, Simei and Khatib) to have additional bicycle parking facilities under a National Cycling Plan announced in 2010.

=== Incidents ===
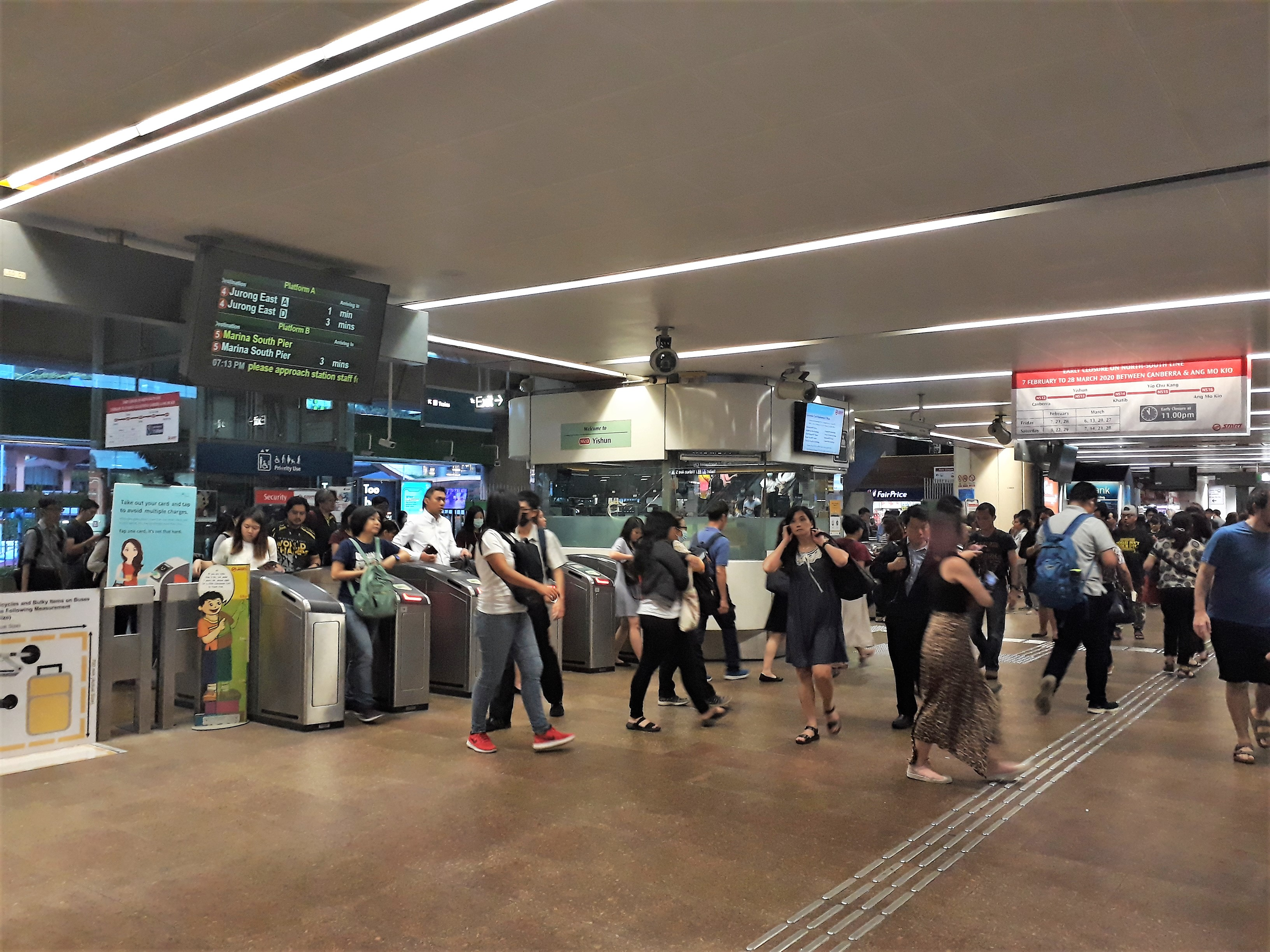
Concourse and ticket barriers at Yishun station.

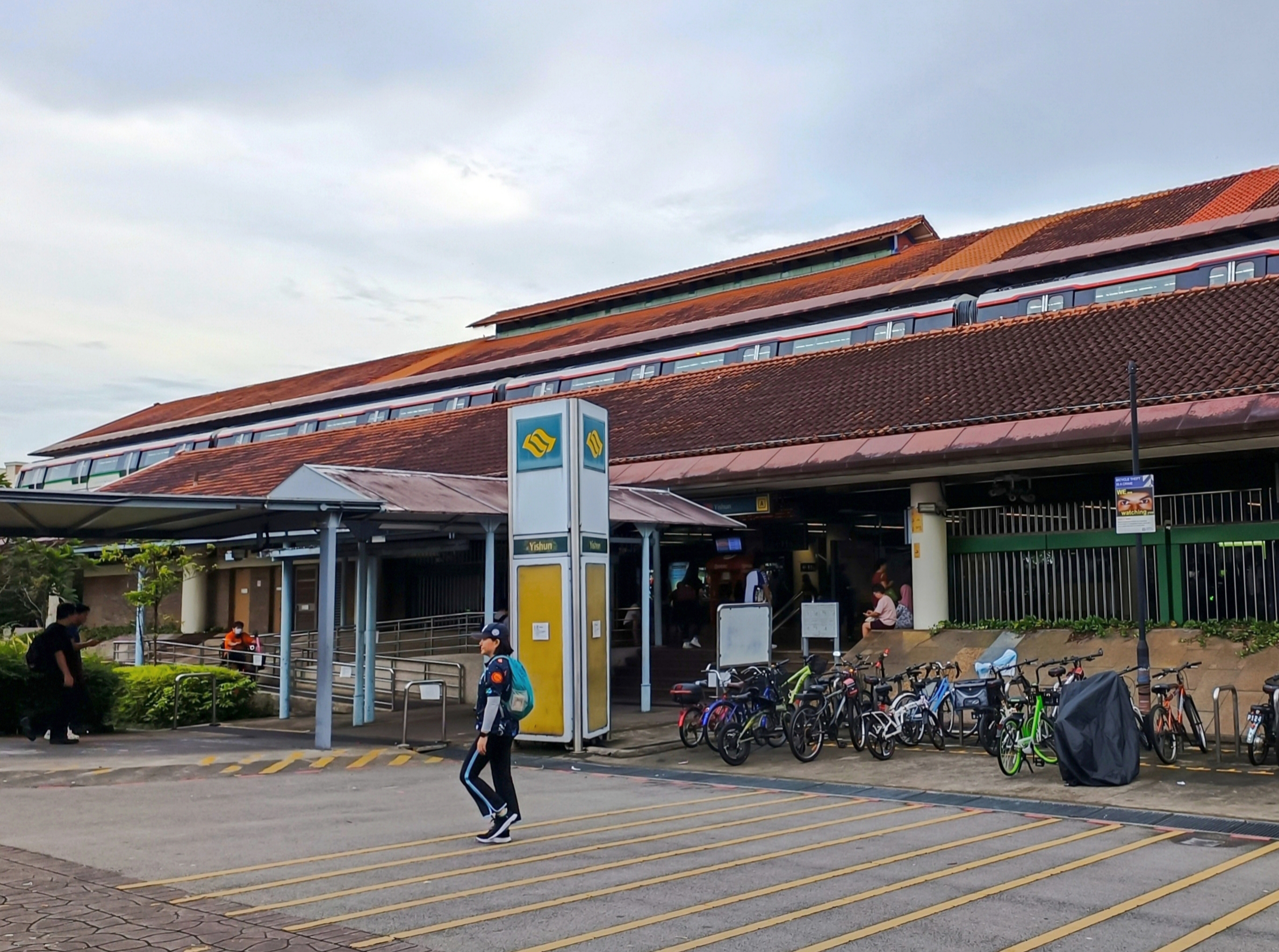
Exit A of the station.

In 1990, there was a power failure which occurred at Yishun station.

In December 2001, the Singapore embassies attack plot was discovered, and had included plans to bomb Yishun MRT station at several points, including the sewers near the station. This was brought up in a debate during a session of the parliament, during which new security measures were proposed, especially on the MRT system itself.

On 16 April 2003, power supply to trackside equipment between Yio Chu Kang and Sembawang stations was disrupted at 8:02 am due to a lightning strike which affected eight point machines along the track. After the SMRT staff manually secured the points and fixed the positions, northbound train services were restored at 8:30 am while southbound services were restored at 8:48 am.

On the early morning of 5 December 2006, a foreign worker in his early twenties, was hit by a southbound train at the station and caused trains from Sembawang to Yio Chu Kang stations to be disrupted for more than an hour. He was later pronounced dead. In February 2007, a leaked CCTV footage of the incident along with another at Admiralty station began circulating on the Internet, with the man in question crawling from under the platform and onto the track as the train approaches, leading to suggestions that it was a case of suicide.

On 19 January 2008 at about 3:30 pm (SST), a call was made from a public telephone at the MRT Station alleging that there was a bomb at the station. Police arrested a 31-year old Chinese man believed to be linked to the crime on 23 February that year at 4:00 pm. The man was charged on 25th of that month for transmitting a false message that makes reference to a bomb.

At 11:45 am on 11 October that year, a man was found on the tracks of the station and was sent to hospital. Train service was disrupted in between Sembawang and Yio Chu Kang stations, affecting 2,900 people. Regular service resumed at 12:16 pm.
