= Masjid Darul Makmur =

Mosque located in Yishun, Singapore

Masjid Darul Makmur مسجد دار المكمور
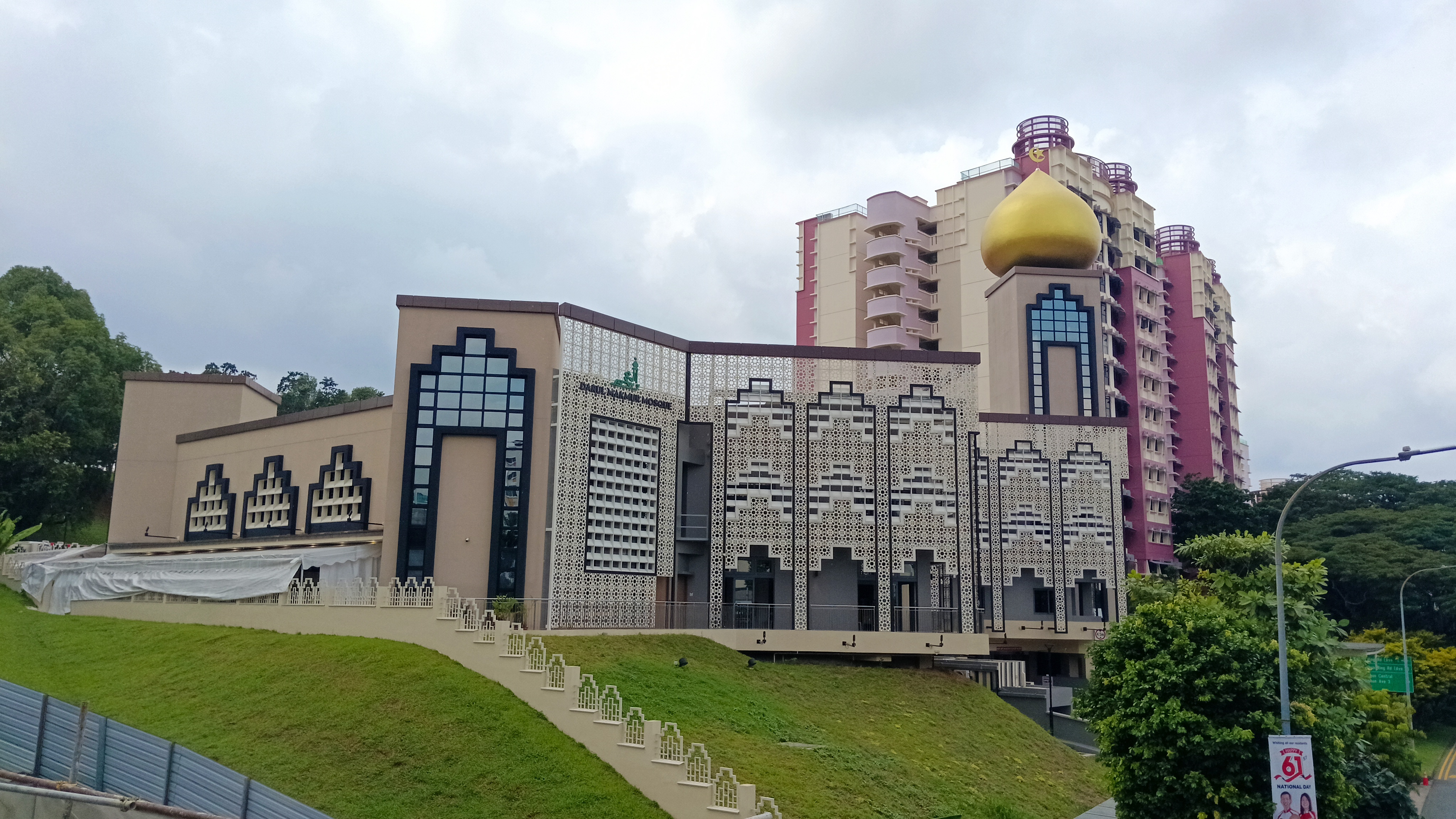
- Main facade of the mosque, as seen from the overhead bridge of Yishun Avenue.

- Location in Singapore

Religion
- Affiliation: Sunni Islam

Location
- Location: 950 Yishun Avenue 2, Singapore 769099
- Country: Singapore
- Coordinates: 1.4368868°N 103.8342718°E

Architecture
- Type: Mosque
- Style: Modernist architecture
- Established: 1983
- Completed: 1987

Specifications
- Minaret: 1
- Minaret height: 2.8 m

Masjid Darul Makmur (Jawi: مسجد دار المكمور) is a mosque located in Yishun, Singapore. Built in 1987, it is one of two mosques in Yishun, the other being Masjid Ahmad Ibrahim. The mosque had most recently been rebuilt in 2025 and is the largest mosque in the North Region of the country.

== Etymology ==
Darul Makmur is a Malay romanized version of the Arabic term Dār al-Makmūr (دار المكمور), which literally translates to "Abode of Prosperity" in the English language. Such name has also historically been used for the Malaysian state of Pahang.

== History ==
In 1982, the Majlis Ugama Islam Singapura (MUIS) confirmed plans for the construction of a mosque in the residential areas of Yishun. Beforehand, an unofficial committee had collected $9,000 in donations for the construction of the mosque. The committee of the proposed mosque was officialized on 3 April 1983. The MUIS later confirmed the name of the mosque to be Masjid Darul Makmur on 1 November of the same year. Then in 1984, the location of the construction site was revealed; a hill in the Yishun Neighbourhood Park which faced the nearby road, Yishun Avenue 2. A model of the mosque was also unveiled to the public in an exhibition and presented by Haji Mahat Samad, a member of the mosque committee.

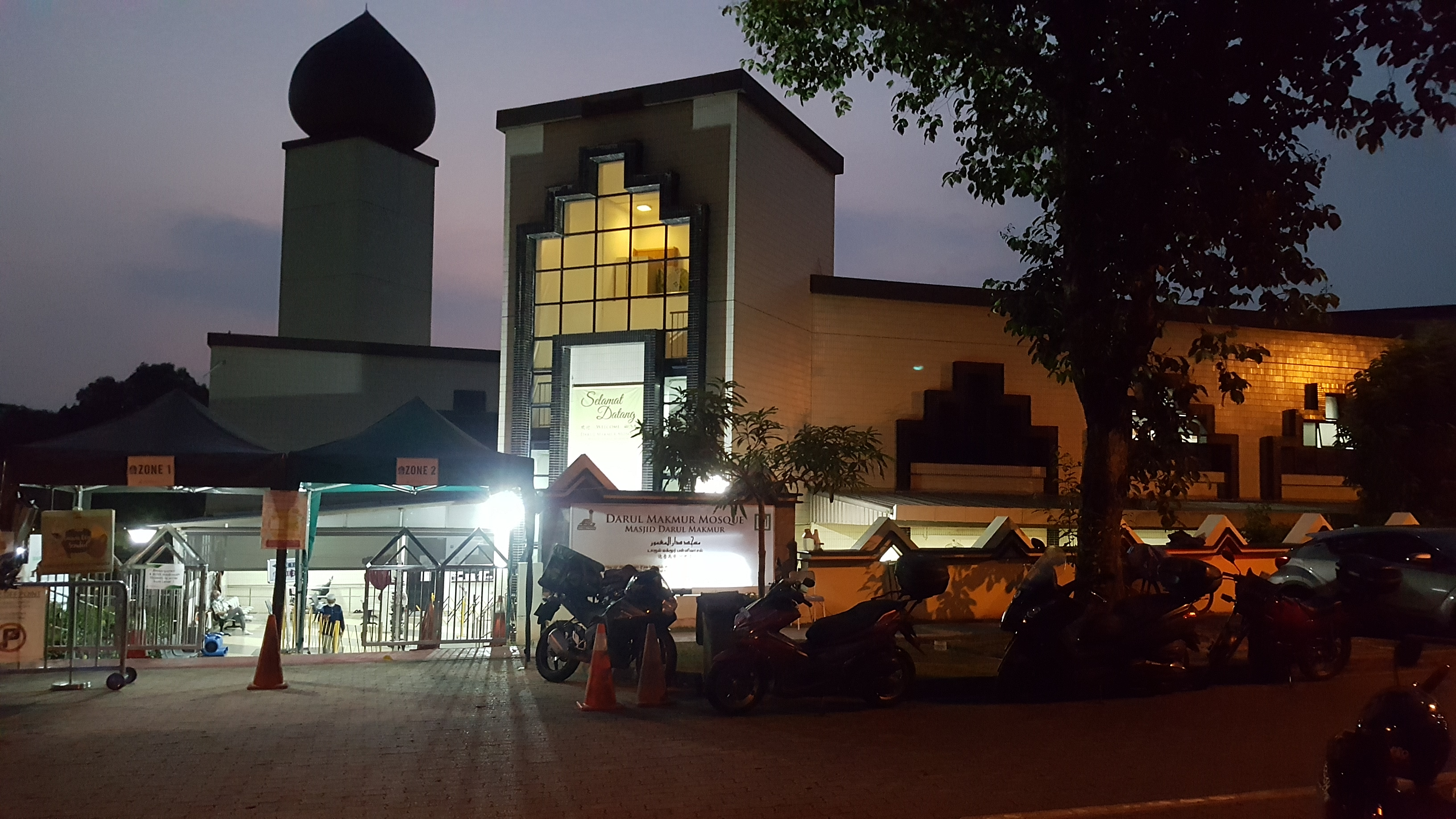
Masjid Darul Makmur in 2021, three years before the reconstruction.

Construction on Masjid Darul Makmur began in 1985 and by mid January 1986, it was halfway complete, along with two other mosques, Masjid Darul Aman and Masjid Al-Mukminin. A local calligraphy artist, Ahmad Tarmidzi, designed the logo for the mosque, which was approved in April of that year. The mosque was completed in June 1987 and was officially opened a month later on 25 July 1987, with Malay politician Yatiman bin Yusof giving a speech at the inauguration ceremony on the same day. On 20 February 1989, the mosque was visited by Saudi Arabian diplomat and First Saudi Minister of Communication, Alawi bin Darwish Kayal, while on the way to an inter-country conference held in Singapore.

Masjid Darul Makmur was closed on 24 April 2023 for an extensive upgrading project aimed at expanding the capacity of the mosque and making it more accessible for worshippers. A temporary surau was established in the courtyard of the North View Secondary School, which had been disused as a school since 2017. The mosque was fully reconstructed at a cost of $15 million, reopening on 7 June 2025 to coincide with the Islamic festival of Eid al-Fitr. The rebuilt mosque had an increased capacity of four thousand worshippers, while new ramps and lifts were installed for the use of elderly worshippers.

By capacity, Masjid Darul Makmur is one of the largest mosques in the North Region of Singapore, surpassing Masjid Ahmad Ibrahim, Masjid An-Nur, Masjid Yusof Ishak, Masjid Assyafaah and the Sembawang Malay Settlement Mosque.

== Gallery ==
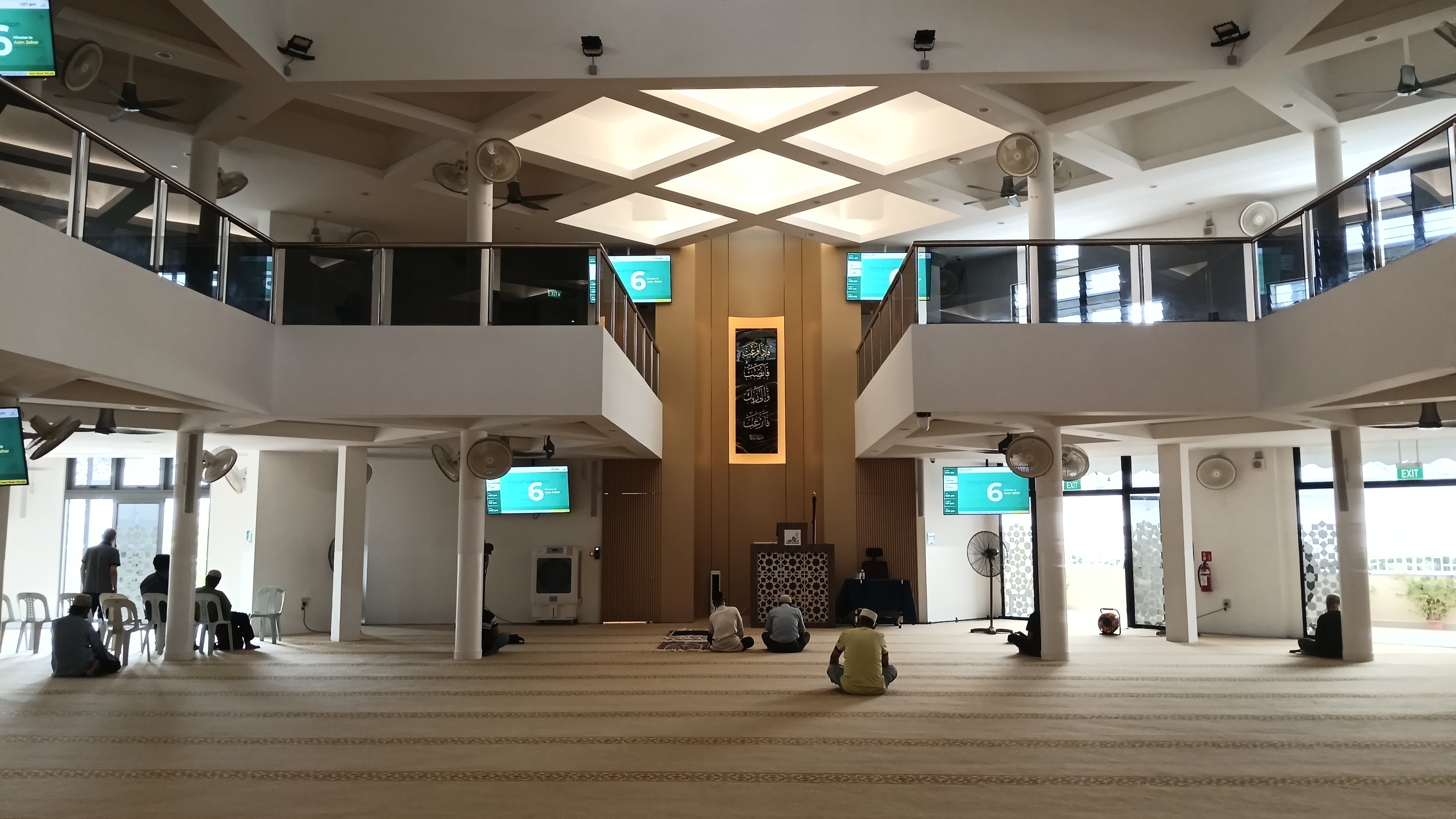
The interior of the mosque.

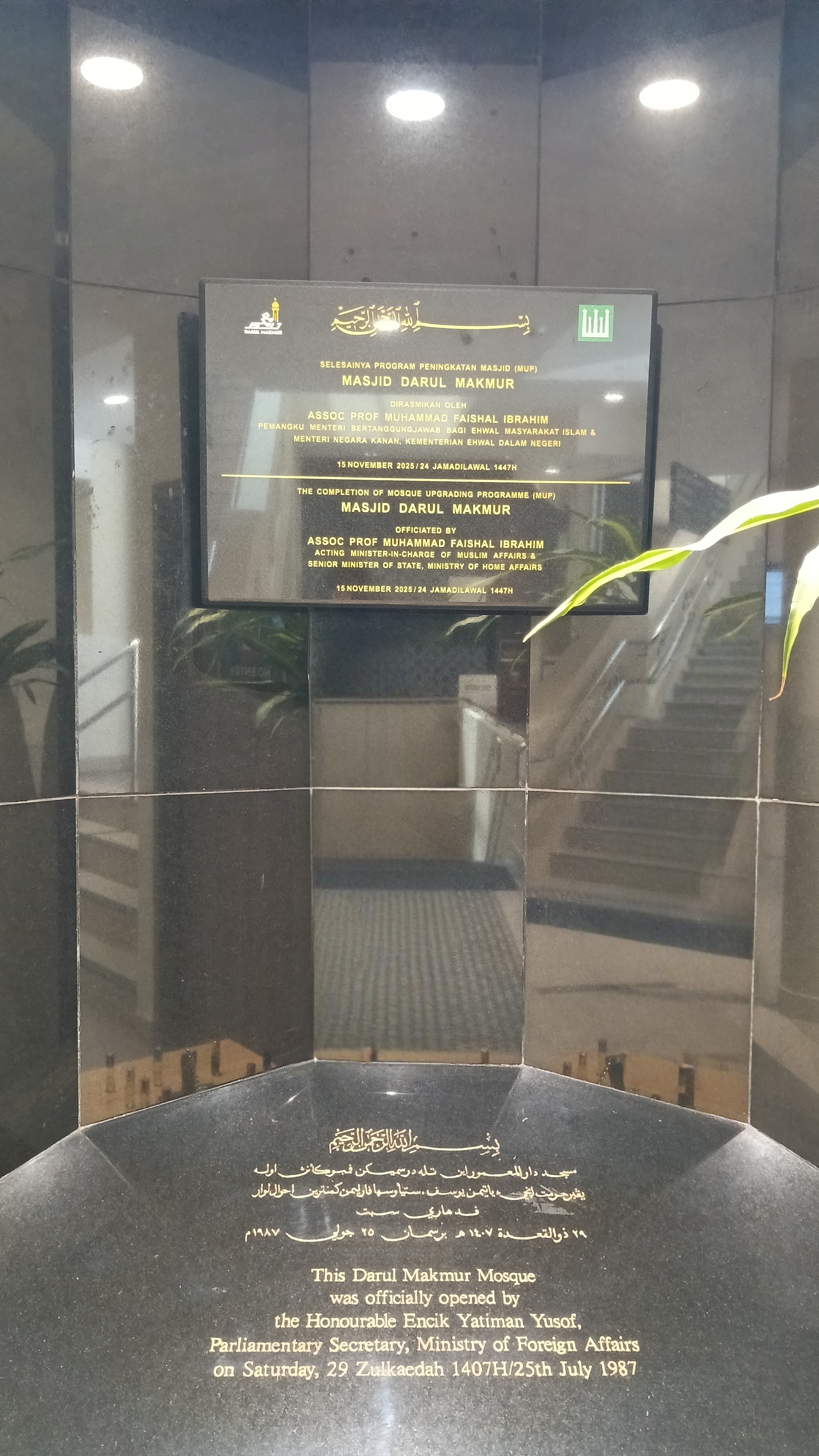
A commemorative plaque in the hallway which marks the completion of the mosque in 1987, as well as the reconstruction of the mosque in 2025.

== Transportation ==
Masjid Darul Makmur is accessible from both the Canberra MRT station and Yishun MRT station, both stations which are situated back-to-back on the North–South MRT line; while there are also two bus stops outside the mosque.

== See also ==
- List of mosques in Singapore
