= Ahmad Ibrahim Secondary School =

- 伊布拉欣中学; Sekolah Menengah Ahmad Ibrahim

Location
- 751 Yishun Avenue 7, Singapore 768928; Singapore; 1°26′10″N 103°49′47″E

Information
- Type: Government; Co-educational
- Motto: With Integrity and Compassion
- Established: 1962; 64 years ago
- Principal: Goh Soon Hoe
- Enrolment: approx. 1,200
- Colour: Green Red Silver
- Website: ahmadibrahimsec.moe.edu.sg

Ahmad Ibrahim Secondary School (AISS) is a co-educational government secondary school in Yishun, Singapore. Founded in 1962, it was the second integrated school to be established in Singapore.

The school is named after Ahmad Ibrahim, Singapore's first Health Minister who was remembered for "garnering the support of all races at a time when communal relations were sensitive and volatile".

== Learning For Life Programme (LLP) In AI- OLE ==
=== Outdoor Learning Experience(OLE) ===
Since 2005, the PE Department has held Outdoor Learning Experience Programme (OLE) for all Sec1-3 in school where students embark on journey to explore outdoors and engage in physical activities outdoors that cannot be held in school. Examples are camping, hiking, kayaking, et cetera. This would allow students to build good knowledge physically and develop mentally while experiencing sports outdoor.

== History ==
=== Ahmad Ibrahim Integrated Secondary School (1962–1986) ===
AISS was established in 1962 as Ahmad Ibrahim Integrated Secondary School (AISS). It was named after Ahmad Ibrahim, a Malay community leader and politician who died in August 1962. It was the second integrated school established after the introduction of the integrated education scheme in 1960. The school was declared open by Parliamentary Secretary for Education Lee Khoon Choy. The school adopted the motto of "Tolerance and Cooperation" as its aim was to break away from the language barriers that existed in most schools then. Chia Meng An was appointed as the first principal. The school begun functioning in 1963, with both Chinese and English streams.

In 1967 the school was selected as the first pilot school for the Open Education Programme for the blind, which aimed to place visually-impaired students in mainstream secondary school through providing adequate support and facilities. In 1985 the school moved to a new building in Yishun as the first school to function in the newly established satellite town. The last batch of Chinese stream students graduated from Ahmad Ibrahim Integrated Secondary School in 1986, the same year that the institution was renamed Ahmad Ibrahim Secondary School to reflect the transition into an English stream school.

=== Ahmad Ibrahim Secondary School (1986–present) ===
In 1987, the school received the Guinness Stout Effort award for its Open Education Program, which was given out by Tan Cheng Bock, Chairman of the Parliamentary Committee on Education. In 2006, AISS was recognised as a Niche Programme School for shooting due to its strong track record in that sport.

In 2012, AISS celebrated its 50th anniversary, with President Tony Tan launching a heritage gallery and Minister for Home Affairs and Law K. Shanmugam launching a student centre as part of the celebrations.

== School culture and identity ==
=== School Crest ===
The torch with its red glowing flame symbolizes the light of integrity and the warmth of compassion. The twirling background design together with the torch is a stylised depiction of the letters "ai", the abbreviated form of the school's name. The green colour represents the school's value of harmony in a multi-racial, multi-religious school, and the silver colour its perseverance in the pursuit of excellence.

== Co-curricular activities ==
The school has produced several outstanding shooters who went on to represent Singapore in major competitions, and has consistently been ranked highly for the National Inter-school Shooting Championships for its 10 metre air rifle event (as part of the International Shooting Sports Federation (ISSF) shooting event) despite its background as a neighbourhood school in Yishun. After being awarded as the Niche Programme School for shooting, the school has since received a boost in funding, and is allowed to admit students based on their potential in shooting via Direct School Admission.

== Notable alumni ==
- Jasmine Ser: Olympian (shooting), 2012 Summer Olympics
- Judee Tan: Comedian and actress, Mediacorp
- Lin Meijiao: Actress, Mediacorp
- VK Harneysh : Actor, Vasantham, Mediacorp

== See also ==
- Ahmad Ibrahim - Singapore politician
