= First Lee Kuan Yew Cabinet =

First Cabinet of Singapore from 1959 to 1963

- 1st Cabinet of Singapore

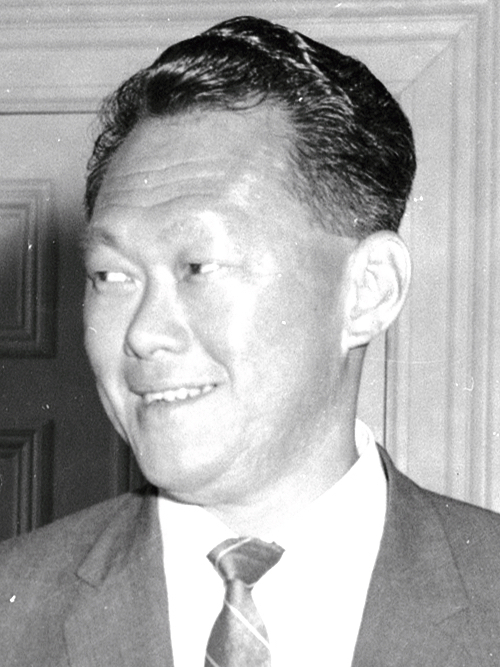
- Date formed: 5 June 1959
- Date dissolved: 18 October 1963

People and organisations
- Head of state: Sir William Goode (until 1959); Yusof bin Ishak (from 1959)
- Head of government: Lee Kuan Yew
- Deputy head of government: Toh Chin Chye
- Member party: People's Action Party
- Status in legislature: Supermajority (until 1961); Majority (1961–1962); Minority (from 1962)
- Opposition party: Singapore People's Alliance
- Opposition leader: Lim Yew Hock

History
- Election: 1959
- Legislature term: 2nd Legislative Assembly
- Predecessor: Lim Yew Hock Cabinet
- Successor: Second Lee Kuan Yew Cabinet

The First Lee Kuan Yew Cabinet was the Cabinet of Singapore from 5 June 1959 to 18 October 1963. It was formed on 5 June 1959, after the People's Action Party won the 1959 general election, and was led by Lee Kuan Yew following his election as Prime Minister.

A minor cabinet reshuffle was made on 24 September 1961.

== Cabinet ==
The First Lee Kuan Yew Cabinet was composed of the following members.

Portfolio	Name	Term
Prime Minister	Lee Kuan Yew	5 June 1959 – 28 November 1990
Deputy Prime Minister	Toh Chin Chye	5 June 1959 – 15 April 1968
Minister for National Development	Ong Eng Guan	5 June 1959 – 20 June 1960
Minister for National Development	Toh Chin Chye	20 June 1960 – 25 August 1960 (acting)
Minister for National Development	Tan Kia Gan	25 August 1960 – 18 October 1963
Minister for Finance	Goh Keng Swee	5 June 1959 – 8 August 1965
Minister for Home Affairs	Ong Pang Boon	5 June 1959 – 18 October 1963
Minister for Labour and Law	K. M. Byrne	5 June 1959 – 23 September 1961
Minister for Labour	Ahmad Ibrahim	24 September 1961 – 21 August 1962
Minister for Labour	Ong Pang Boon	21 August 1962 – 18 October 1963 (acting)
Minister for Health	Ahmad Ibrahim	5 June 1959 – 23 September 1961
Minister for Health and Law	K. M. Byrne	24 September 1961 – 18 October 1963
Minister for Education	Yong Nyuk Lin	5 June 1959 – 18 October 1963
Minister for Culture	S. Rajaratnam	5 June 1959 – 8 August 1965

== List of office holders ==
The following is the list of office holders in the First Lee Kuan Yew cabinet. Cabinet members are listed in bold.

Prime Minister's Office
Office	Name	Term start	Term end
Prime Minister	**Lee Kuan Yew**	5 June 1959	18 October 1963
Deputy Prime Minister	**Toh Chin Chye**	5 June 1959	18 October 1963
Parliamentary Secretary to the Prime Minister	Chan Sun Wing	25 July 1959	22 July 1961
Parliamentary Secretary to the Prime Minister	Ya'acob Mohamed	24 September 1961	18 October 1963
Parliamentary Secretary to the Deputy Prime Minister	Goh Chew Chua	25 July 1959	18 October 1963
Ministry of Culture
Office	Name	Term start	Term end
Minister for Culture	**S. Rajaratnam**	5 June 1959	18 October 1963
Parliamentary Secretary for Culture	Lee Khoon Choy	25 July 1959	23 September 1961
Parliamentary Secretary for Culture	G. Kandasamy	24 September 1961	9 June 1963
Ministry of Education
Office	Name	Term start	Term end
Minister for Education	**Yong Nyuk Lin**	5 June 1959	18 October 1963
Parliamentary Secretary for Education	Leong Keng Seng	25 July 1959	22 July 1961
Parliamentary Secretary for Education	Lee Khoon Choy	24 September 1961	18 October 1963
Ministry of Finance
Office	Name	Term start	Term end
Minister for Finance	**Goh Keng Swee**	5 June 1959	18 October 1963
Parliamentary Secretary for Finance	Low Por Tuck	25 July 1959	22 July 1961
Parliamentary Secretary for Finance	S. Ramaswamy	24 September 1961	18 October 1963
Ministry of Health (until 24 September 1961)
Office	Name	Term start	Term end
Minister for Health	**Ahmad Ibrahim**	5 June 1959	23 September 1961
Parliamentary Secretary for Health	Sheng Nam Chin	25 July 1959	22 July 1961
Ministry of Health and Law (from 24 September 1961)
Office	Name	Term start	Term end
Minister for Health and Law	**K. M. Byrne**	24 September 1961	18 October 1963
Parliamentary Secretary for Health and Law	Buang Omar Junid	24 September 1961	18 October 1963
Ministry of Home Affairs
Office	Name	Term start	Term end
Minister for Home Affairs	**Ong Pang Boon**	5 June 1959	18 October 1963
Parliamentary Secretary for Home Affairs	Tan Kia Gan	25 July 1959	25 August 1960
Parliamentary Secretary for Home Affairs	Lee Siew Choh	1 November 1960	22 July 1961
Parliamentary Secretary for Home Affairs	Chan Chee Seng	24 September 1961	18 October 1963
Ministry of Labour (from 24 September 1961)
Office	Name	Term start	Term end
Minister for Labour	**Ahmad Ibrahim**	24 September 1961	21 August 1962
Minister for Labour	**Ong Pang Boon** (Note: In an acting capacity.)	21 August 1962	18 October 1963
Parliamentary Secretary for Labour	Wee Toon Boon	24 September 1961	18 October 1963
Ministry of Labour and Law (until 24 September 1961)
Office	Name	Term start	Term end
Minister for Labour and Law	**K. M. Byrne**	5 June 1959	23 September 1961
Parliamentary Secretary for Labour and Law	Wee Toon Boon	25 July 1959	23 September 1961
Ministry of National Development
Office	Name	Term start	Term end
Minister for National Development	**Ong Eng Guan**	5 June 1959	20 June 1960
Minister for National Development	**Toh Chin Chye**	20 June 1960	25 August 1960
Minister for National Development	**Tan Kia Gan**	25 August 1960	18 October 1963
Parliamentary Secretary for National Development	Ya'acob Mohamed	25 July 1959	23 September 1961
Parliamentary Secretary for National Development	Chor Yeok Eng	24 September 1961	18 October 1963
