= Ahmad Ibrahim (Singaporean politician) =

Singaporean politician (1927–1962)

- Official portrait, 1950s

Minister for Health
- In office 6 June 1959 – 24 September 1961
- Prime Minister: Lee Kuan Yew
- Preceded by: A. J. Braga (SPA)
- Succeeded by: K. M. Byrne (PAP)

Minister for Labour
- In office 24 September 1961 – 21 August 1962
- Prime Minister: Lee Kuan Yew
- Preceded by: K. M. Byrne (PAP)
- Succeeded by: Ong Pang Boon (PAP)

Member of the Legislative Assembly for Sembawang Constituency
- In office 6 April 1955 – 21 August 1962
- Preceded by: Constituency established
- Succeeded by: Teong Eng Siong (PAP)
- Majority: 1955: 4,281 (63.24%); 1959: 4,316 (54.69%)

Personal details
- Born: 17 May 1927 Penang, Straits Settlements (present-day Malaysia)
- Died: 21 August 1962 (aged 35) State of Singapore
- Resting place: Bidadari Cemetery
- Party: People's Action Party (1957–1962)
- Other political affiliations: Independent (1955–1957)
- Children: 5

Ahmad bin Ibrahim (17 May 1927 – 21 August 1962) was a Singaporean politician, unionist, and firefighter who served as the minister for health from 1959 to 1961 and the minister for labour from 1961 until his death in office in 1962. Born and educated in Penang, Ahmad was a unionist with the Naval Base Labour Union and served as their vice-chairman. He made his political debut at the 1955 general election as an independent candidate, contesting against the Progressive Party's Lee Kim Kee in Sembawang Constituency.

Ahmad was successfully elected, and he served as the member of the Legislative Assembly representing Sembawang as an independent candidate before publicly joining the People's Action Party (PAP) in 1957. He contested in the 1959 general election as a PAP candidate for Sembawang Constituency again, being re-elected in a four-way contest. He was subsequently named as the minister for health in prime minister Lee Kuan Yew's first cabinet. In 1961, he would become the minister for labour following a cabinet reshuffle. Ahmad died in office in 1962; the Ahmad Ibrahim Secondary School and Masjid Ahmad Ibrahim are named in honour of him.

== Early life and career ==
Ahmad was born in 1927 in Penang, Malaysia, when it was a part of the Straits Settlements. He was educated in Penang, being taught in Malay at Bayan Lepas School and in English at Francis Light School and Penang Free School. Ahmad later moved to Singapore, where he worked as a watch room operator with the Singapore Naval Base's fire department in 1946. He subsequently began getting involved with their trade union, serving as the first branch secretary of the All-Singapore Fire Brigade Employees Union in 1948. He eventually rose to the role of vice-chairman of the Naval Base Labour Union. In 1955, his occupation was listed as a firefighter for the Naval Base.

== Political career ==
=== 1955 general election ===
During the 1955 general election, the Naval Base Labour Union decided to boycott the Singaporean government's general elections, as they felt they had a "disinterest in our problems". They requested all participating political parties not to contest in their constituency of Sembawang. However, the Progressive Party (PP) ignored their request and fielded candidate Lee Kim Kee. In response, the Naval Base Labour Union nominated Ahmad as an independent candidate to contest against Lee.

The Straits Times reported that Ahmad was confident to have the support of about 3,000 unionists in the constituency, and that his promises were allowing service employees benefits from the government's social legislation and amending the Trade Union Ordinance. The union's general secretary, Sandrasegaran Woodhull, stated that Ahmad's nomination was supported by political parties People's Action Party (PAP) and Labour Front.

He later received support from 5,000 members of the Naval Base Labour Union and from the PAP's Lee Kuan Yew, who asked Sembawang constituents to vote for Ahmad. Ahmad went on to win Sembawang Constituency with 4,281 votes against the PP's Lee Kim Kee's 2,488 votes. Lee Kuan Yew revealed in his memoirs that they fielded Ahmad as an independent candidate instead of under the PAP banner as the party was considered "too radical" at the time, and he would better garner the vote of the Malays and Indians if unaffiliated with the PAP.

=== First Legislative Assembly (1955–1959) ===
In July 1955, Ahmad requested that the government conduct a review of the salaries of the Royal Malayan Navy (RMN), noting a difference in pay between the RMN and the Singapore Police Force. The Singapore government responded to Ahmad that they would not do so as the pay rates were last revised in 1952. They also said that the duties of the RMN and the Singapore Police Force differed too much for them to be considered similar services. His suggestion for granting loans to RMN personnel was also rejected, but the possibility of housing for RMN's families was still under consideration.

In November, during a boycott by Malay students, Ahmad brought up that funding for Malay education in 1956 was only S$2 million, while Chinese and English education received S$10 million and S$20 million, respectively. He also supported the establishment of a Malay secondary school. The following year, in April, Ahmad and assemblyman Mak Pak Shee were sent to the United Kingdom to learn about parliamentary procedure. In July 1957, he stated he would join the PAP; prior to this, he had always voted with the PAP. Some sources also said that he was already a member of the PAP, but Ahmad did not confirm nor deny this claim. Nonetheless, his affiliation with the PAP increased their representation in the Legislative Assembly to four seats. Later in October, the PAP revealed their new Central Executive Committee (CEC), with Ahmad being a part of the committee, having been previously co-opted. By 1959, he was the assistant secretary-general of the PAP's CEC.

=== Second Legislative Assembly (1959–1962) ===
During the 1959 general election, Ahmad contested in Sembawang Constituency again as a PAP candidate, going against the Singapore People's Alliance's Chew Seng, the Liberal Socialist Party's Lau Sai Seng, and the Malayan Indian Congress's V. Jayaram. He went on to win with 4,316 votes. Ahmad was subsequently named the minister for health in prime minister Lee's first cabinet and was sworn in on 6 June 1959.

On 9 June 1959, he outlined his ministry's new health policy, which was to improve relations with the public and build two new hospitals in Jurong and Changi. That same week, Ahmad and his health parliamentary secretary Sheng Nam Chin visited all the hospitals in Singapore. In August, he expanded on their health policy and upcoming plans such as providing better food in hospitals, testing the implementation of maternity homes in populated areas, and the conceptualisation of a dental nurse training school and dental outpatient unit, among other things. This policy was planned to be carried out within the next five years. He also restructured the Medical Advisory Council, limiting its membership to qualified professionals and tasking it with advising the health minister on medical matters. Ahmad urged the public to get vaccinated for smallpox in December, following suspected cases in Malaysia.

In July 1960, Ahmad defended his decision to enlist 20 specialists and 40 doctors from overseas to work in Singapore. He stated on Radio Singapore that there was a lack of local doctors to fill roles needed in the health ministry. He also said that the dental industry would be expanded soon, and that more dentists would be hired and a dental nurse training school would be created soon. Ahmad attended the inaugural meeting of the Singapore Blood Donors' Association in September, praising the cooperation between public services and the government. The following month, he launched an x-ray campaign in Farrer Park, offering x-rays to those above fourteen-years-old to help detect tuberculosis early.

After a cabinet reshuffle in September 1961, Ahmad was appointed minister for labour, swapping portfolios with K. M. Byrne; he briefly served as acting labour and law minister in this period. According to Lee, he selected Ahmad because he needed a labour minister who could more effectively deal with strikes and communist influence. Ahmad proved his strength as labour minister by deregistering the then-communist-affiliated Trade Union Congress and attacking other pro-communists in the Works Brigade.

== Death ==
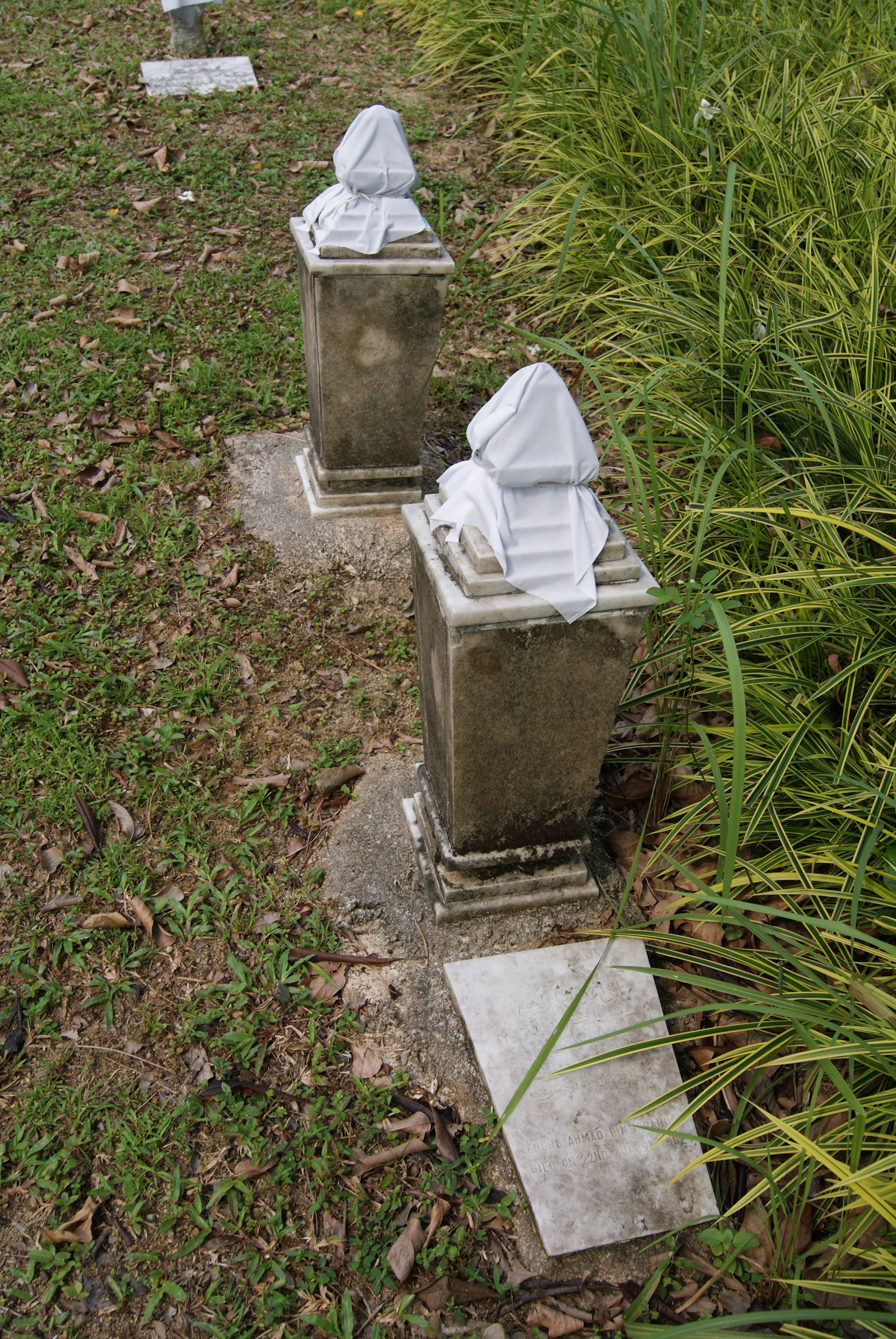
Ahmad's gravestone at Bidadari Cemetery, 2012

Ahmad had been in poor health for several years; in January 1958, he had a major operation on his liver. He underwent another major operation in December 1961 in London. In June 1962, Ahmad returned to London for another checkup, before returning to Singapore in July. He would be admitted to the Singapore General Hospital in August.

On August 19, his health began deteriorating. On 21 August 1962, at 3:15 p.m. SST, Ahmad died in office aged 35 at the Singapore General Hospital from a liver ailment. He was survived by his wife and five children. Yang di-Pertuan Negara Yusof Ishak accorded him a state funeral, and messages of condolence were given by prime minister Lee, Barisan Sosialis's Lim Chin Siong and Lee Siew Choh, and secretary-general of the Naval Base Labour Union S. Ghouse. From Malaysia, labour minister Bahaman Samsuddin and the National Union of Plantation Workers's general secretary P. P. Narayanan paid their respects to Ahmad. He was buried at Bidadari Cemetery.

== Legacy ==
Ahmad's death reduced the PAP's majority in the Legislative Assembly at a time when the government was pursuing merger with Malaya. He was also remembered for his multiracial views. In honour of him, Jalan Ahmad Ibrahim, a road in Boon Lay; Ahmad Ibrahim Primary School and Ahmad Ibrahim Secondary School, schools in Yishun; and the Masjid Ahmad Ibrahim in Yishun are named after him. In 2012, at the 50th anniversary celebration of the Ahmad Ibrahim Secondary School, Sing Geok Shan of CNA described him as having "garnering the support of all races at a time when communal relations were sensitive and volatile."

== See also ==
- List of members of the Singapore Parliament who died in office
