= Ministry of Health (Singapore) =

Government ministry in Singapore

Agency overview
- Formed: 1955; 71 years ago
- Jurisdiction: Government of Singapore
- Headquarters: 16 College Road, College of Medicine Building, Singapore 169854
- Motto: Championing a Healthy Nation
- Employees: 1,573 (2018)
- Annual budget: ▲ S$20.04 billion (2026)
- Ministers responsible: Ong Ye Kung, Minister & Minister-in-charge of Aging Issues; Tan Kiat How, Senior Minister of State; Shawn Loh, Minister of State (assuming office in January 2027); Rahayu Mahzam, Minister of State
- Agency executives: Lai Wei Lin, Permanent Secretary (Policy and Development); Ng How Yue, Permanent Secretary (Services); Kenneth Mak, Director-General of Health; Ho Kaiwei, Deputy Secretary (Services); Philip Ong, Deputy Secretary (Development); Vincent Wu, Deputy Secretary (Policy)
- Child agencies: Health Promotion Board; Health Sciences Authority; Communicable Diseases Agency; Singapore Dental Council; Singapore Medical Council; Singapore Nursing Board; Singapore Pharmacy Council; Traditional Chinese Medicine Practitioners Board
- Website: www.moh.gov.sg
- Agency ID: T08GA0015H

The Ministry of Health (MOH; Malay: Kementerian Kesihatan; Chinese: 保健卫生部; Tamil: சுகாதார அமைச்சு) is a ministry of the Government of Singapore responsible for managing the public healthcare system in Singapore.

== History ==
In March 2026, MOH's Chinese name was updated from "卫生部" to "保健卫生部" in presenting the full duties of the ministry of health care and hygiene. Only the Chinese name of the ministry was changed.

== Statutory boards ==
- Health Promotion Board
- Health Sciences Authority
- Communicable Diseases Agency
- Singapore Dental Council
- Singapore Medical Council
- Singapore Nursing Board
- Singapore Pharmacy Council
- Traditional Chinese Medicine Practitioners Board

== Ministers ==
The Ministry is headed by the Minister for Health, who is appointed as part of the Cabinet of Singapore. The incumbent Minister is Ong Ye Kung, an MP for Sembawang GRC from the governing People's Action Party.

Minister	Took office	Left office	Party	Cabinet
A. J. Braga; MP for Katong (1900–1968)	6 April 1955	3 June 1959	LF (until 1958)	Marshall
A. J. Braga; MP for Katong (1900–1968)	6 April 1955	3 June 1959	LF (until 1958)	Lim
A. J. Braga; MP for Katong (1900–1968)	6 April 1955	3 June 1959	SPA (from 1958)	Lim
Ahmad Ibrahim; MP for Sembawang (1927–1962)	5 June 1959	24 September 1961	PAP	Lee K. I
K. M. Byrne; MP for Crawford (1913–1990)	24 September 1961	18 October 1963	PAP	Lee K. I
Yong Nyuk Lin; MP for Geylang West (1918–2012)	19 October 1963	15 April 1968	PAP	Lee K. II
Chua Sian Chin; MP for MacPherson (1933–2014)	16 April 1968	1 June 1975	PAP	Lee K. III
Chua Sian Chin; MP for MacPherson (1933–2014)	16 April 1968	1 June 1975	PAP	Lee K. IV
Toh Chin Chye; MP for Rochore (1921–2012)	2 June 1975	5 January 1981	PAP	Lee K. IV
Toh Chin Chye; MP for Rochore (1921–2012)	2 June 1975	5 January 1981	PAP	Lee K. V
Goh Chok Tong; MP for Marine Parade (born 1941)	6 January 1981	31 May 1982	PAP	Lee K. VI
Howe Yoon Chong; MP for Potong Pasir (1923–2007)	1 June 1982	1 January 1985	PAP	Lee K. VI
Tony Tan; MP for Sembawang (born 1940)	2 January 1985	6 May 1985	PAP	Lee K. VII
Richard Hu; MP for Kreta Ayer (1926–2023)	7 May 1985	31 December 1986	PAP	Lee K. VII
Yeo Cheow Tong; MP for Hong Kah (until 1988) and Hong Kah GRC (from 1988) (born 1947)	1 January 1987	1 January 1994	PAP	Lee K. VII
Yeo Cheow Tong; MP for Hong Kah (until 1988) and Hong Kah GRC (from 1988) (born 1947)	1 January 1987	1 January 1994	PAP	Lee K. VIII
Yeo Cheow Tong; MP for Hong Kah (until 1988) and Hong Kah GRC (from 1988) (born 1947)	1 January 1987	1 January 1994	PAP	Goh I
Yeo Cheow Tong; MP for Hong Kah (until 1988) and Hong Kah GRC (from 1988) (born 1947)	1 January 1987	1 January 1994	PAP	Goh II
George Yeo; MP for Aljunied GRC (born 1954)	2 January 1994	24 January 1997	PAP	Goh II
Yeo Cheow Tong; MP for Hong Kah GRC (born 1947)	25 January 1997	2 June 1999	PAP	Goh III
Lim Hng Kiang; MP for West Coast GRC (born 1954)	3 June 1999	31 July 2003	PAP	Goh III
Lim Hng Kiang; MP for West Coast GRC (born 1954)	3 June 1999	31 July 2003	PAP	Goh IV
Khaw Boon Wan (Note: Khaw Boon Wan served as acting minister from 1 August 2003 until 11 August 2004.); MP for Tanjong Pagar GRC (until 2006) and Sembawang GRC (from 2006) (born 1952)	1 August 2003	11 August 2004	PAP	Goh IV
Khaw Boon Wan; MP for Tanjong Pagar GRC (until 2006) and Sembawang GRC (from 2006) (born 1952)	12 August 2004	20 May 2011	PAP	Lee H. I
Khaw Boon Wan; MP for Tanjong Pagar GRC (until 2006) and Sembawang GRC (from 2006) (born 1952)	12 August 2004	20 May 2011	PAP	Lee H. II
Gan Kim Yong; MP for Chua Chu Kang GRC (born 1959)	21 May 2011	14 May 2021	PAP	Lee H. III
Gan Kim Yong; MP for Chua Chu Kang GRC (born 1959)	21 May 2011	14 May 2021	PAP	Lee H. IV
Gan Kim Yong; MP for Chua Chu Kang GRC (born 1959)	21 May 2011	14 May 2021	PAP	Lee H. V
Ong Ye Kung; MP for Sembawang GRC (born 1969)	15 May 2021	Incumbent	PAP	Lee H. V
Ong Ye Kung; MP for Sembawang GRC (born 1969)	15 May 2021	Incumbent	PAP	Wong I
Ong Ye Kung; MP for Sembawang GRC (born 1969)	15 May 2021	Incumbent	PAP	Wong II

== Incidents ==
=== SingHealth data breach (2018) ===
Between June and July 2018, personal data of 1.5 million patients was exfiltrated as a result of a cyberattack on SingHealth, which is the largest group of healthcare institutions in Singapore and is wholly owned by MOH.

=== HIV data leak (2019) ===
On 28 January 2019, sensitive information including names, identification numbers, phone numbers, addresses and HIV test results of 12,400 HIV-positive people were leaked online due to mishandling of the information by then-staff member, Ler Teck Siang. Ler, who was the head of National Public Health Unit at MOH at the time, had access to the information and had not complied with the Ministry of Health's security guidelines. Ler downloaded the information on to a personal thumb drive, which his then-boyfriend Mikhy K Farrera Brochez had leaked online subsequently. Minister of Health, Gan Kim Yong, explained that data leak had not been announced earlier, so as to safeguard the patients' well-being.

=== Community Health Assist Scheme computer system error (2019) ===
On 16 February 2019, MOH released a public statement admitting that there had been an error in computer systems managed by NCS that were used in relation to the Community Health Assist Scheme (CHAS). The error resulted in a miscalculation of the amount of health care subsidies applicants were eligible to receive through means-testing, such that approximately 1,300 people received lower subsidies and 6,400 people received higher subsidies.

The first discrepancy in a result of a CHAS card holder was detected on 24 September 2018 by MOH. NCS was informed immediately. NCS had initially attributed the issue to intermittent network connection problems. Between 9 October 2018 and 2 November 2018, another 5 more cases involving discrepancies were detected, prompting the launch of a more in-depth investigation. In November 2018, NCS traced the cause of the discrepancies to a software version issue used on a server used by the system. The identified issue occurred during a migration of the system to another government data center in September 2018. The software version issue was resolved as part of other changes made to address an unrelated performance issue on 10 October 2018. However, incorrect results that had been generated between 18 September 2018 and 10 October 2018 remained in the system.

Remedial actions were then carried out by MOH and NCS to assess impact on the affected applicants. MOH announced that it would work with grant scheme administrators and healthcare institutions to follow up with notifications and reimbursement to the affected applicants. According to media reports, MOH intended to recover costs and expenses arising from this incident from NCS as MOH was entitled to pursuant to the contract between the parties.

== See also ==
- Healthcare in Singapore
