= Social reserves =

Social Reserves refer to the intangible ties that bind a country together. As a resource, they may be compared to a country's financial reserves. The term bears some similarity to the Bhutanese concept of Gross national happiness in that it attempts to value quality of life in a way that goes beyond traditional economic indicators.

The term was coined in November 2013 by Singapore President Dr Tony Tan at an event organised by St. Joseph's Institution, Singapore. Speaking in a lecture series on leadership, President Tan said:

”The social reserves of a nation are the intangible ties that bind us to one another, and make a nation greater than the sum of individual citizens. [They] are the goodwill that makes us look out for one another even during difficult times, the resilience to overcome challenges and constraints, and the tenacity to progress as individuals and as a nation.”

Singapore maintains large financial reserves, primarily through two sovereign wealth funds. The Government of Singapore Investment Corporation (GIC) manages Singapore's foreign reserves; Temasek Holdings is an investment company owned by the Government of Singapore. Prior to running for Singapore's elected presidency, President Tony Tan was executive director of GIC.

An example of an effort to build up social reserves, he said, was the way that he had expanded Singapore's President's Challenge charity event to go beyond fund-raising to promote volunteerism and social entrepreneurship.
