= Masjid Assyafaah =

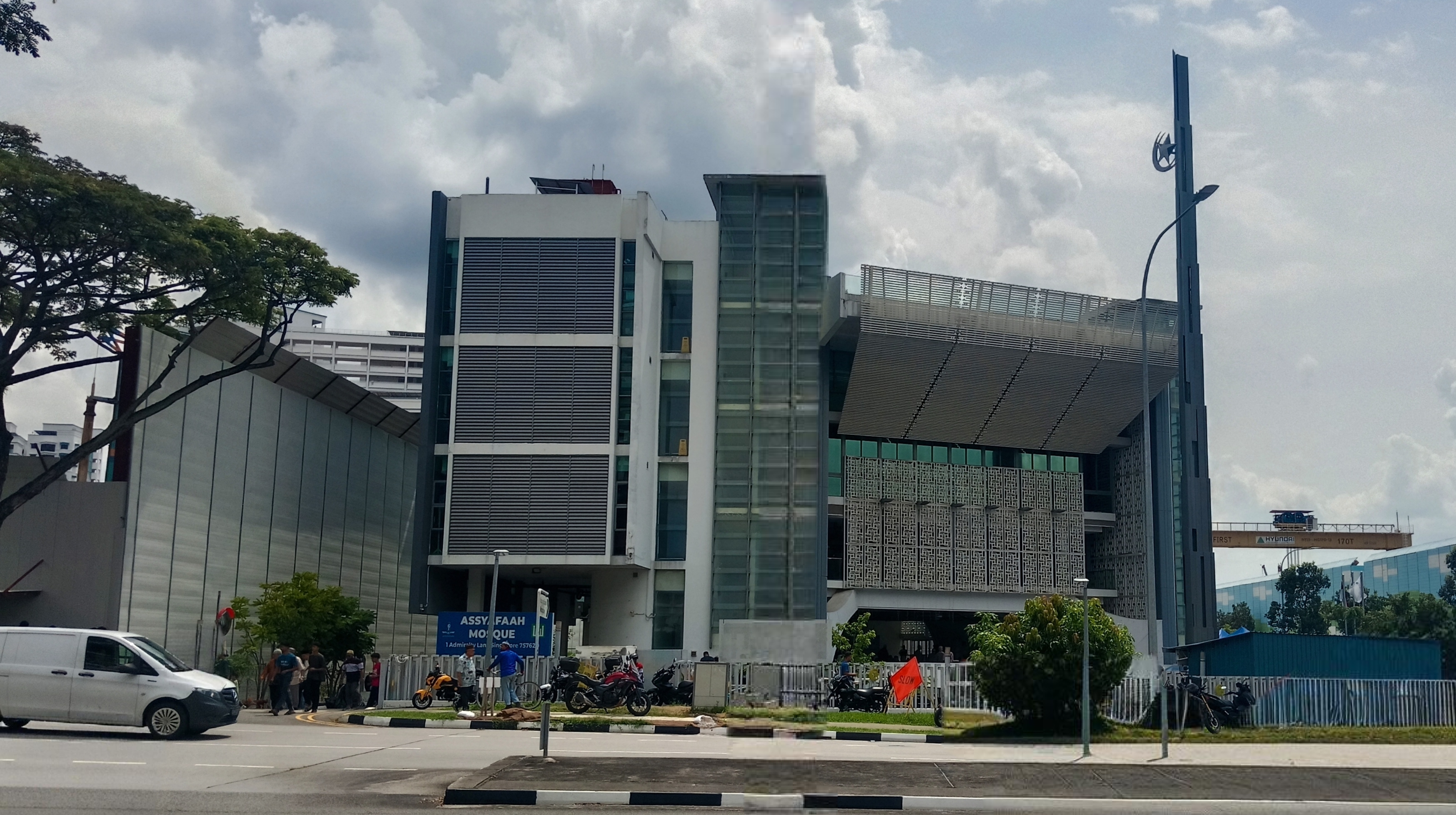

- Location in Singapore

Religion
- Affiliation: Sunni Islam

Location
- Location: 1 Admiralty Ln, Singapore 757620
- Country: Singapore
- Interactive map of Masjid Assyafaah
- Coordinates: 1.4556720°N 103.8192894°E

Architecture
- Architect: Tan Kok Hiang
- Type: Mosque
- Style: Modern, Islamic architecture
- Established: 2002
- Completed: 31 March 2004

Masjid Assyafaah (Jawi: مسجد الشفاعة) is a mosque located along Admiralty Lane in Sembawang, Singapore. Built in 2004, it is the second mosque that stands in the Sembawang neighborhood. Its name is derived from the Arabic word shafa'a which refers to intercession.

== History ==
Before the establishment of the modern Sembawang neighborhood, there were only two mosques in the area, namely the Malay Settlement Mosque in the northern part of the area, and a congregational mosque in the heart of the area. The latter mosque, built in 1920, was managed by the Malabar Muslim Jama'ath (that also oversaw the reconstruction of Masjid Malabar at Kampong Glam), and was eventually demolished in 2004. The Malay Settlement Mosque survived, but due to its location in a dark and forested area, it proved an unpopular destination with locals and modern residents of Sembawang. In the year 2000, plans for a new mosque, named Masjid Assyafaah, were confirmed by the Majlis Ugama Islam Singapura (MUIS) as an official replacement for the demolished congregational mosque in the area. In 2002, a scale model of the mosque was unveiled to the public to demonstrate how modern and classical Islamic styles blended together in the design of the building. The mosque committee also sold miniature replicas of the mosque in 2003, in order to raise funds to complete the rest of the construction. Masjid Assyafaah was ultimately completed on 31 March 2004 and was officially opened a day later. That same year, it was exhibited at the Venice Biennale as part of Singapore's entry.

Masjid Assyafaah was one of the mosques affected by the nationwide COVID-19 pandemic and was closed down in 2020. It was reopened in August of the same year, under extensive safety measures. The mosque was also put under extensive security patrols after it became a target in the Singapore mosque attacks plot in 2021.

== Architecture ==
Masjid Assyafaah is built in a modern architectural style which attempts to deviate from the traditional style of mosques, such as the lack of a minaret and dome. In place of a minaret, the mosque has a 33-metre minaret-like structure made out of steel that stands in its courtyard, with a crescent-and-star logo attached to the top of this structure. The mosque's exterior was designed by Tan Kok Hiang, a leading architect of the Forum Architects architectural firm.

The longer, sloped facade of the building faces the direction of Mecca in order to minimize the heat gained from the sun. The layout of the general building is rectangular and has four stories, with the first floor consisting of the reception counter, wudhu facilities, as well as the main prayer hall. The second and third levels contain extensions of the main prayer hall and also a madrasa. Skylights in the roof illuminate the mosque through decorative screens with arabesque patterns on them, while the screens help to act as ventilation for the mosque.

== Transportation ==
The nearest form of public transport to Masjid Assyafaah is the Sembawang MRT station on the North–South MRT line.

== See also ==
- List of mosques in Singapore
- Sembawang Malay Settlement Mosque
