= Sembawang Constituency =

Historical constituency in Singapore

Sembawang
- Former Single Member constituency for the Parliament of Singapore
- Region: Singapore

Former constituency
- Created: 1955
- Abolished: 1988
- Seats: 1
- Member: Constituency Abolished
- Town Council: Sembawang
- Replaced by: Sembawang GRC

Sembawang Constituency was a single member constituency in Sembawang, Singapore that was formed in 1955 and continued until 1988 when it was merged into Sembawang Group Representation Constituency.

== Member of Parliament ==
Year	Member of Parliament	Party
Legislative Assembly of Singapore
1955	Ahmad Ibrahim	Independent
1959	Ahmad Ibrahim	PAP
1963	Teong Eng Siong	PAP
Parliament of Singapore
1968	Teong Eng Siong	PAP
1972	Teong Eng Siong	PAP
1976	Teong Eng Siong	PAP
1979	Tony Tan	PAP
1980	Tony Tan	PAP
1984	Tony Tan	PAP

== Electoral results ==
Note: The Elections Department does not include rejected votes when calculating the vote shares of candidates. Hence, all candidates' vote shares will total to 100% at any given election (may not appear so in multi-way contests due to rounding).

=== Elections in 1950s ===
General Election 1955: Sembawang
Party	Candidate	Votes	%	±%
Independent	Ahmad Ibrahim	4,281	63.24	
PP	Lee Kim Kee	2,488	36.76	
Turnout		6,835	64.0	
Independent win (new seat)				

General Election 1959: Sembawang
Party	Candidate	Votes	%	±%
PAP	Ahmad Ibrahim	4,316	54.69	−8.55
MIC	Vangadaslam Jayaram	1,566	19.84	+19.84
SPA	Chew Seng	1,084	13.74	+13.74
LSP	Lau Sai Seng	926	11.73	+11.73
Turnout		7,948	89.7	+25.7
PAP hold		Swing	-8.55	

Note: MIC is allied with Singapore's UMNO and MCA chapters, similar to its Malaysian counterpart with the exception of not using the alliance symbol which was the reason for the elections department of Singapore to view Vangadaslam Jayaram as an independent candidate.

=== Elections in 1960s ===
General Election 1963: Sembawang
Party	Candidate	Votes	%	±%
PAP	Teong Eng Siong	3,745	42.17	−12.52
BS	Chen Poh Chang	3,591	40.43	+40.43
SA	Appavoo Pakri	1,197	13.48	−20.10
UPP	Low Seng Wan	348	3.92	+3.92
Turnout		8,930	95.7	+6
PAP hold		Swing	-12.52	

General Election 1968: Sembawang
Party	Candidate	Votes	%	±%
PAP	Teong Eng Siong	Walkover		
Turnout		11,220		
PAP hold		Swing		

=== Elections in 1970s ===
General Election 1972: Sembawang
Party	Candidate	Votes	%	±%
PAP	Teong Eng Siong	8,466	77.36	
United National Front	Mohd Arif bin Sahul Hameed	2,478	22.64	
Turnout		11,251	92.1	
PAP hold		Swing		

General Election 1976: Sembawang
Party	Candidate	Votes	%	±%
PAP	Teong Eng Siong	13,661	83.57	+6.21
United People's Front	Mohd Arif bin Sahul Hameed	2,685	16.43	+16.43
Turnout		16,767	94.8	+2.7
PAP hold		Swing	+6.21	

By-election 1979: Sembawang
Party	Candidate	Votes	%	±%
PAP	Tony Tan	12,824	78.42	−5.15
United People's Front	Harbans Singh	3,528	21.58	+5.15
Turnout		16,714	94.6	−0.2
PAP hold		Swing	-5.15	

=== Elections in 1980s ===
General Election 1980: Sembawang
Party	Candidate	Votes	%	±%
PAP	Tony Tan	13,415	81.55	−2.02
United People's Front	Harbans Singh	3,035	18.45	+2.02
Turnout		16,932	95.2	+0.6
PAP hold		Swing	-2.02	

General Election 1984: Sembawang
Party	Candidate	Votes	%	±%
PAP	Tony Tan	15,948	77.42	−4.13
Independent	Stanley Mariadass	4,652	22.58	+22.58
Turnout		21,304	95.4	+0.2
PAP hold		Swing	-4.13	

== Historical maps ==
1955 General Election
