= K. M. Byrne =

Singaporean politician

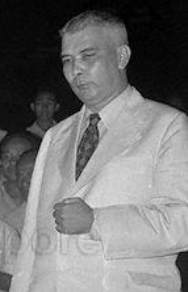
- Byrne in 1953

Minister for Health
- In office 24 September 1961 – 18 October 1963
- Preceded by: Ahmad Ibrahim
- Succeeded by: Yong Nyuk Lin

Minister for Labour
- In office 5 June 1959 – 24 September 1961
- Preceded by: Lim Yew Hock
- Succeeded by: Ahmad Ibrahim

Minister for Law
- In office 5 June 1959 – 18 October 1963
- Preceded by: Office established
- Succeeded by: E. W. Barker

Member of Parliament for Crawford SMC
- In office 30 May 1959 – 3 September 1963
- Preceded by: Constituency established
- Succeeded by: S.T. Bani

Personal details
- Born: Kenneth Michael Byrne; 13 May 1913 Singapore, Straits Settlements, British Malaya
- Died: 14 May 1990 (aged 77) Singapore
- Cause of death: Cardiac arrest
- Spouse: Elaine Margaret Marcus (m. 1939)
- Children: Walter James (son); Melanie Mary (daughter)
- Education: St. Joseph's Institution; Raffles College
- Occupation: Politician; diplomat; lawyer

Kenneth Michael Byrne (13 May 1913 – 14 May 1990) was a Singaporean politician, diplomat and lawyer who served as Minister for Health between 1961 and 1963, Minister for Labour between 1959 and 1961 and Minister for Law between 1959 and 1963.

== Early life and education ==
Byrne was born in Singapore on 13 May 1913. His parents, John and Lizzy Byrne, were both born in Singapore and he was the second child.

He spent part of childhood in Penang due to his father's work and attended St. Xavier's Institution. The family returned to Singapore at the end of 1926. He continued his education at St. Joseph's Institution and Raffles Institution before enrolling into Raffles College (a forerunner of the National University of Singapore) in 1933 and graduating in 1936 with a Diploma in Arts with Class One honours.

== Career ==
=== Colonial Civil Service ===
Byrne joined the service in 1938 and was assigned to the Colonial Administrative Service in 1946.

Byrne was appointed as the magistrate of the Fourth Police Court to replace R. E. Turnbull in 1939.

Byrne was called to the bar in London in 1950.

In 1953, Byrne was transferred to the Marine Department which was later brought under the Department of Commerce and Industry.

He was later appointed as Assistant Secretary of Marine Department, and Principal Assistant Secretary and Deputy Secretary of Commerce and Industry Ministry.

Byrne was Permanent Secretary for the Ministry of Commerce and Industry in 1957 and left the government post in 1958 to join politics.

=== Political career ===
During the 1959 general election, Byrne won the election and was elected as the Member of Parliament for Crawford and was appointed as Minister for Labour and Minister for Law.

Byrne introduced the Industrial Relations Act and the Employment Act in Singapore, which ensured that workers in Singapore were not exploited by foreign investment companies in Singapore. He also presented the Women's Charter to Parliament in 1961 to protect and advance the rights of women and girls in Singapore.

Byrne relinquished his portfolio as Minister for Labour but kept his portfolio as Minister for Law and was appointed as Minister for Health in 1961.

=== Post political career ===
Following Byrne's loss in the 1963 general election, he entered civil service and was appointed as Chairman of the Central Provident Fund and Chairman of the Singapore Tourist Promotion Board.

Byrne was appointed as Singapore's High Commissioner to New Zealand in 1966. In July 1973, he was appointed High Commissioner to India, concurrently serving as High Commissioner to Bangladesh and Sri Lanka, as well as Ambassador to Nepal. From October of that year, he concurrently served as Ambassador to Iran.

He went on to become a lawyer, setting up a private practice in Singapore until his death in 1990.

== Personal life ==
Byrne married Elaine Margaret Marcus on 5 August 1939. They have two children, Walter James and Melanie Mary.

Political offices
New office	Permanent Secretary, Ministry of Commerce and Industry; 1957 – 1958	Succeeded by Abu Bakar Bin Pawanchee
Parliament of Singapore
New constituency	Member of the Singaporean Parliament for Crawford Constituency; 1959 – 1963	Succeeded by S.T. Bani
Government offices
New office	Minister for Law; 1959 – 1963	Succeeded by E. W. Barker
Preceded by Lim Yew Hock	Minister for Labour; 1959 – 1961	Succeeded by Ahmad Ibrahim
Preceded by Ahmad Ibrahim	Minister for Health; 1961 – 1963	Succeeded by Yong Nyuk Lin
