= Masjid Ahmad Ibrahim =

Mosque located in Yishun, Singapore

- Jawi: مسجد أحمد إبراهيم
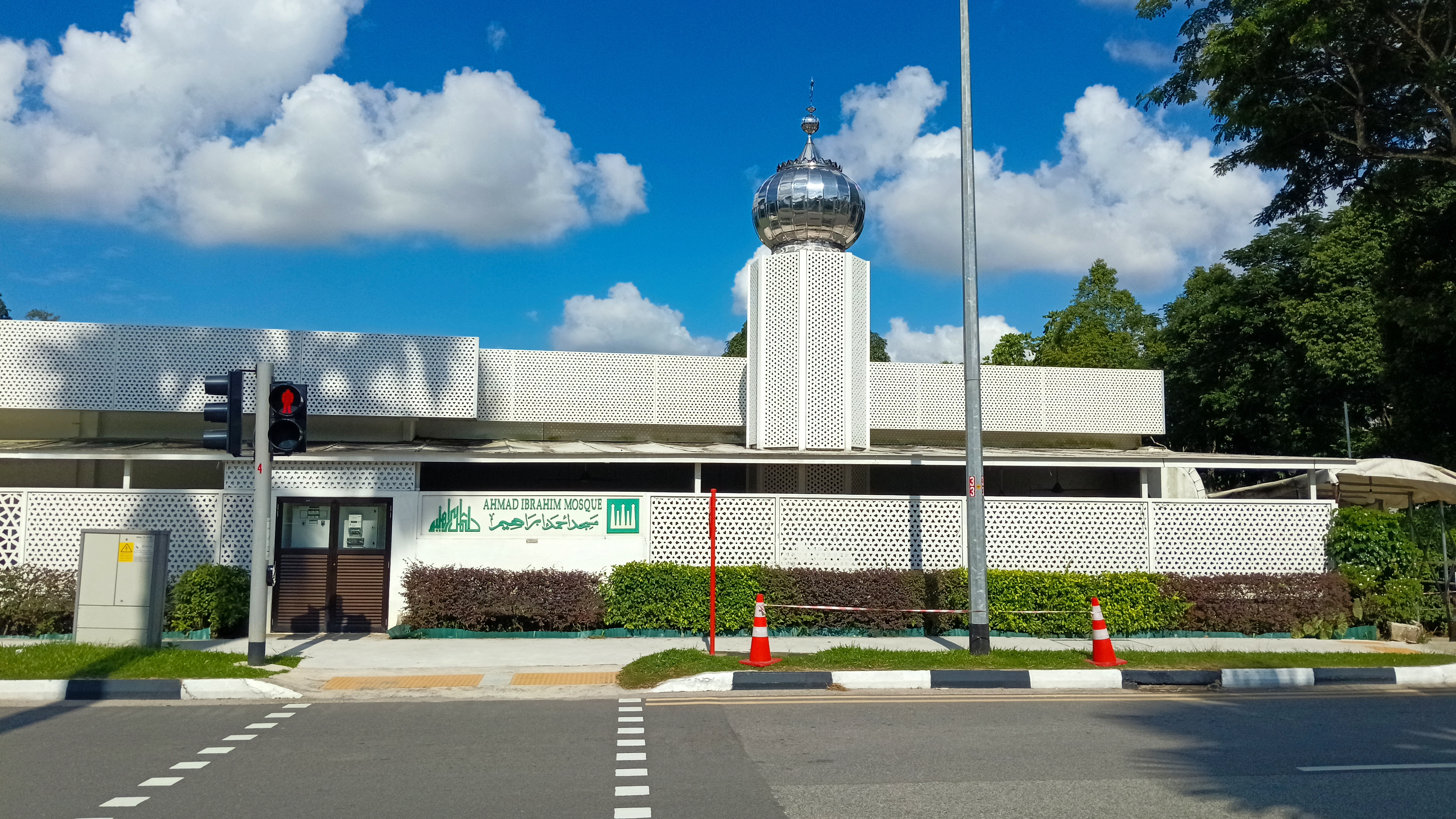
- Main facade of the mosque as seen from across Sembawang Road.

- Location in Singapore

Religion
- Affiliation: Sunni Islam

Location
- Location: 15 Jalan Ulu Seletar, Singapore 769227
- Country: Singapore
- Interactive map of Masjid Ahmad Ibrahim
- Coordinates: 1.4067034°N 103.8204407°E

Architecture
- Established: c. 1955
- Capacity: 500

Masjid Ahmad Ibrahim (Jawi: مسجد أحمد إبراهيم) is a mosque located in Yishun, Singapore. Situated along Sembawang Road within the Springside housing estate, it is named after Ahmad bin Ibrahim (1927–1962), a Singaporean unionist and politician who contributed to the construction of the mosque.

== History ==
A surau was originally established at the site in the late 1950s, with the construction dated to between 1955 to 1959. It was named Surau Nee Soon, in reference to its location within the heart of colonial Yishun. In 1959, a request was made to renovate four suraus in eastern parts of the North Region, one of them being Surau Nee Soon, in order to increase its capacity to accommodate more worshippers. Ahmad bin Ibrahim, a Singaporean unionist and member of the Legislative Assembly, funded a reconstruction of the surau into a mosque. Completed in late 1962, the new mosque was named Masjid Ahmad Ibrahim in memory of him, as he had died on 21 August 1962 and hence did not see the completed mosque.

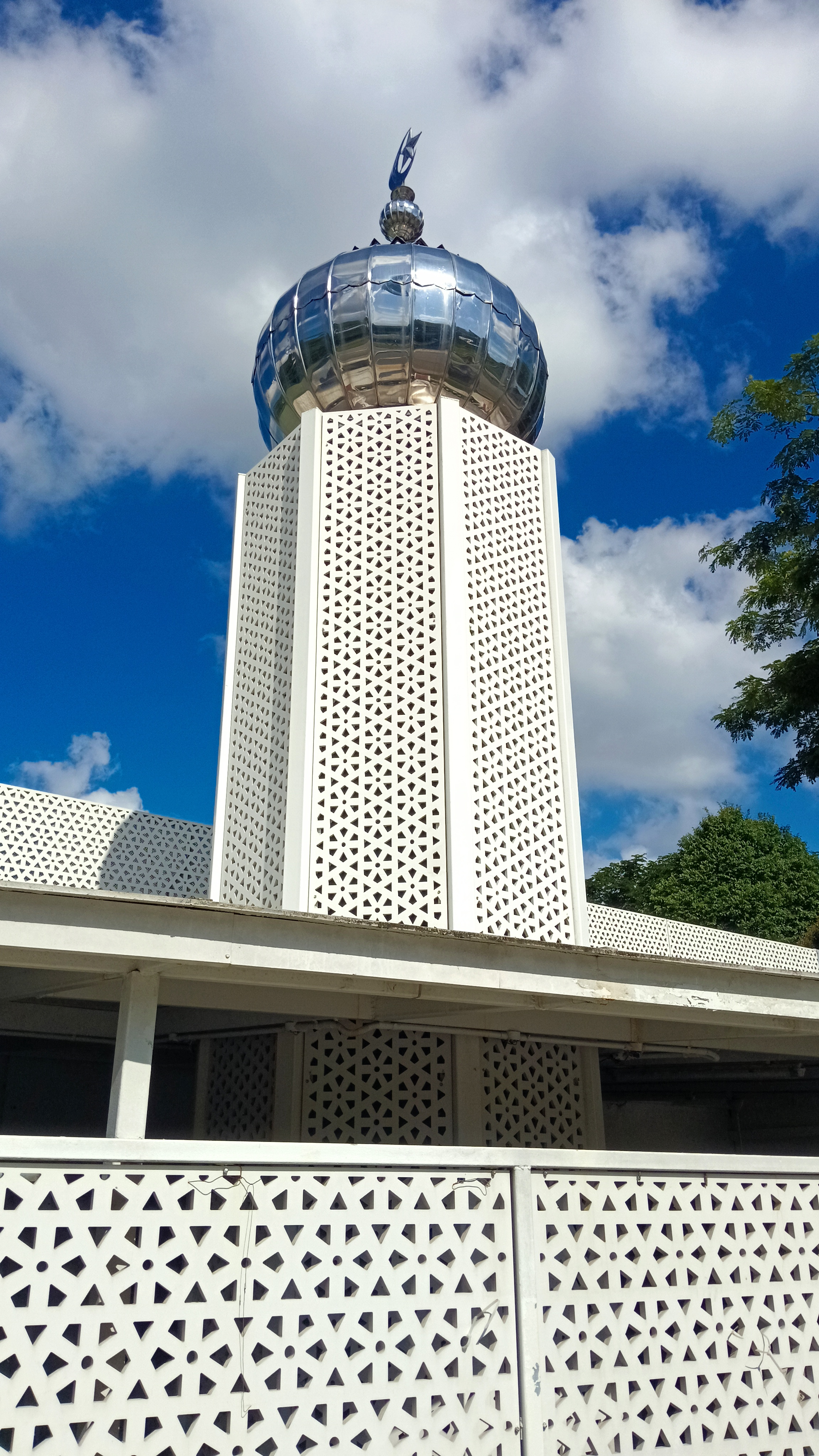
The minaret-like fixture of the mosque that is topped with a silver dome.

In 1988, expansion of Sembawang Road led to concerns that the mosque would be affected, which led to a statement being issued on 27 March of that year which reassured the public that the mosque would not be touched at all. Plans to reconstruct the traditional mosque into a modernized structure with a more contemporary architectural style were also discussed in 1989, but never came to major works.

The mosque is situated on Temporary Occupation License (TOL) land, with the management of the mosque paying a fee to renew the license of the mosque yearly. It is one of four TOL mosques in the country, the other being Masjid Tentera Diraja, Masjid Petempatan Melayu Sembawang and Masjid Pusara Aman.

== Gallery ==
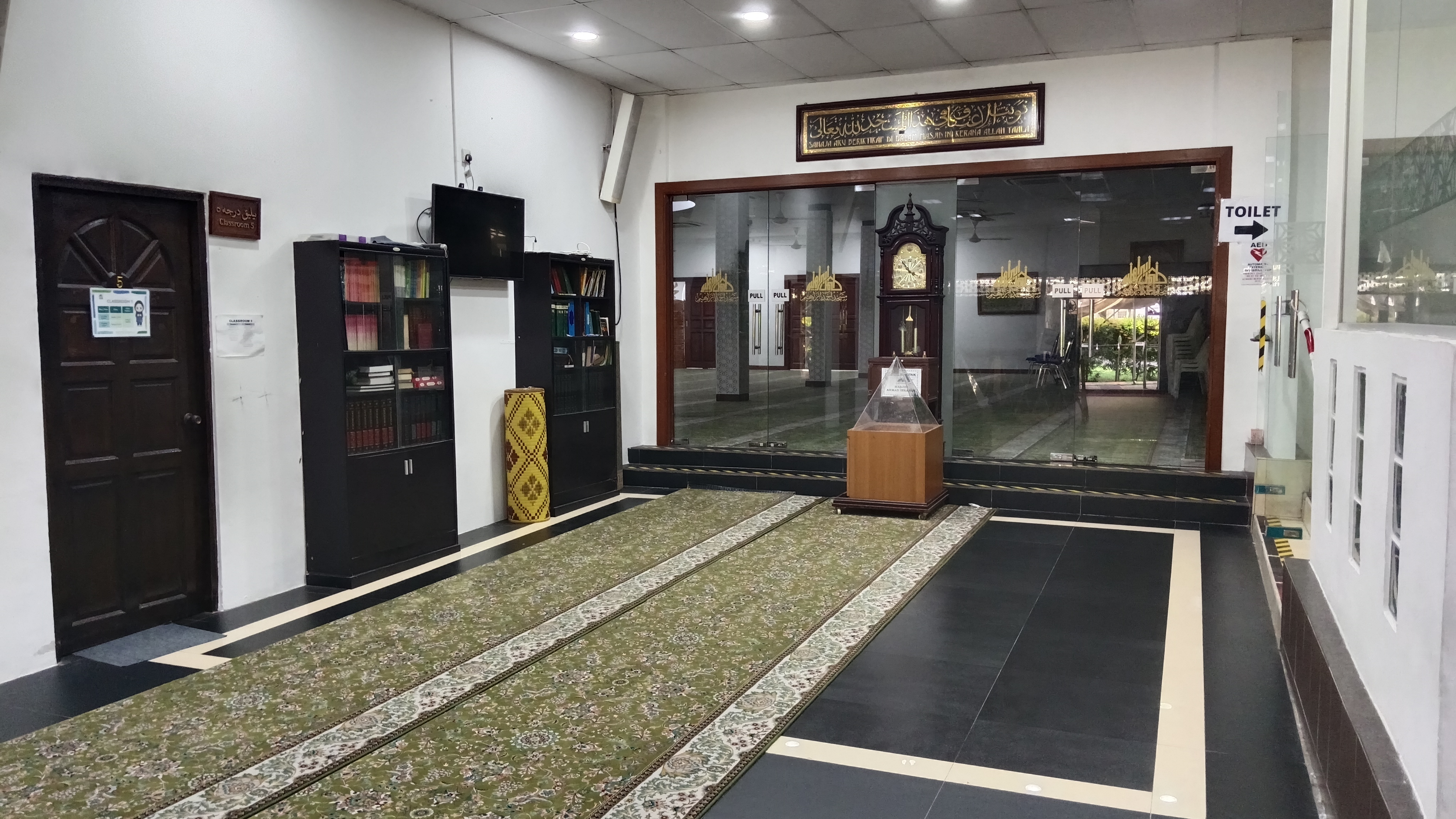
Entrance to the main prayer hall of the mosque.

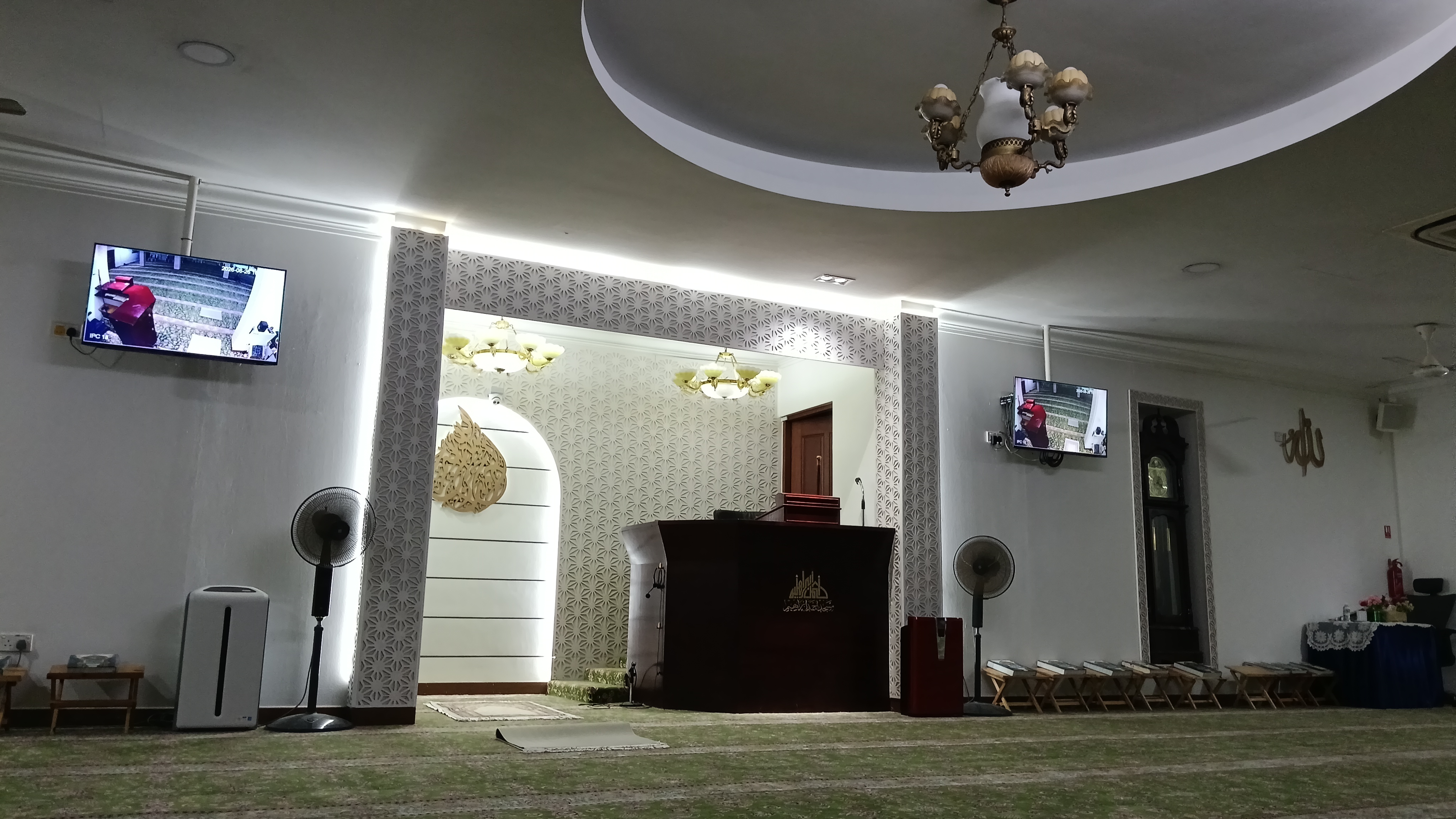
Inside the mosque.

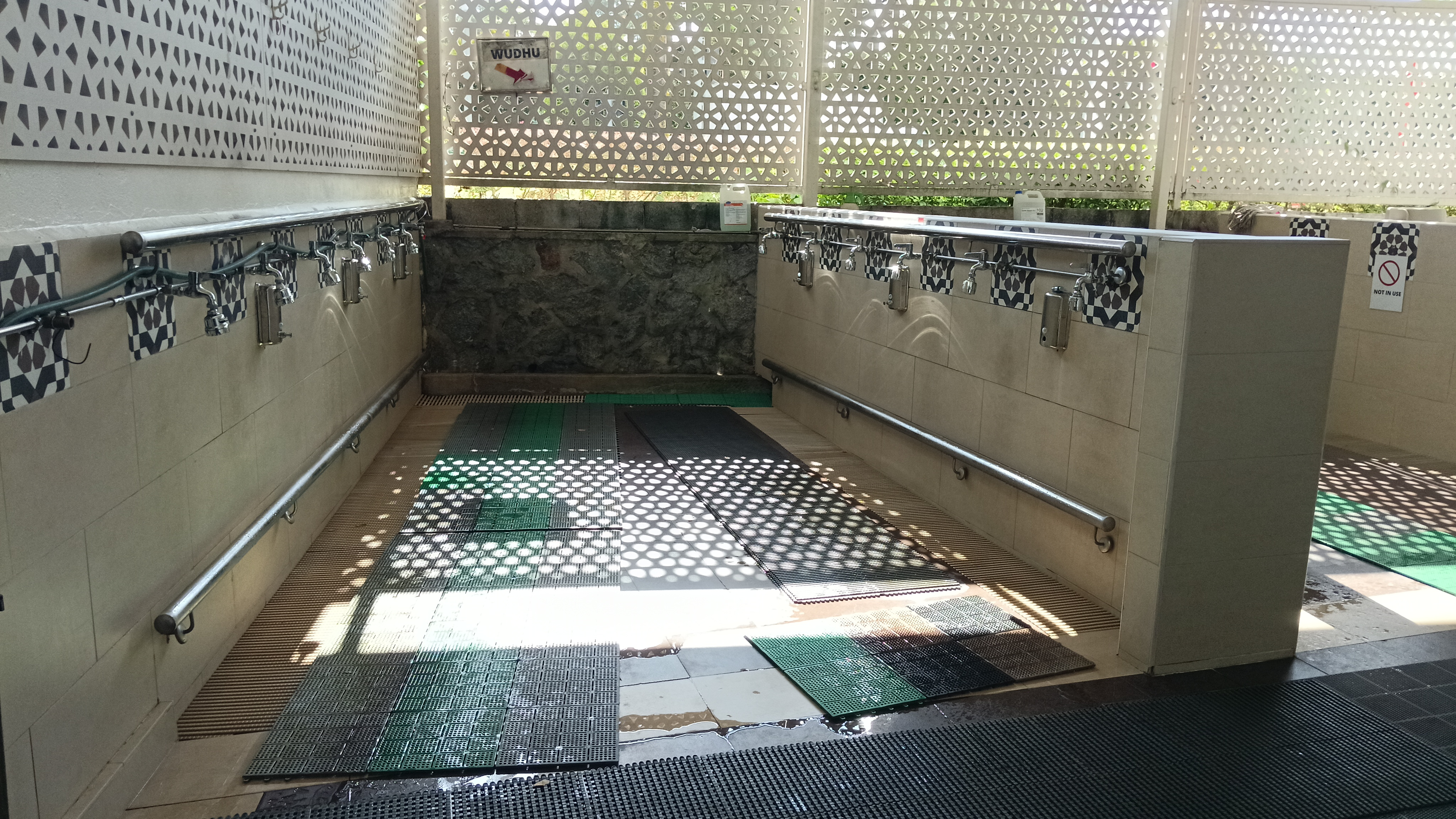
The area for ritual ablutions before prayer.

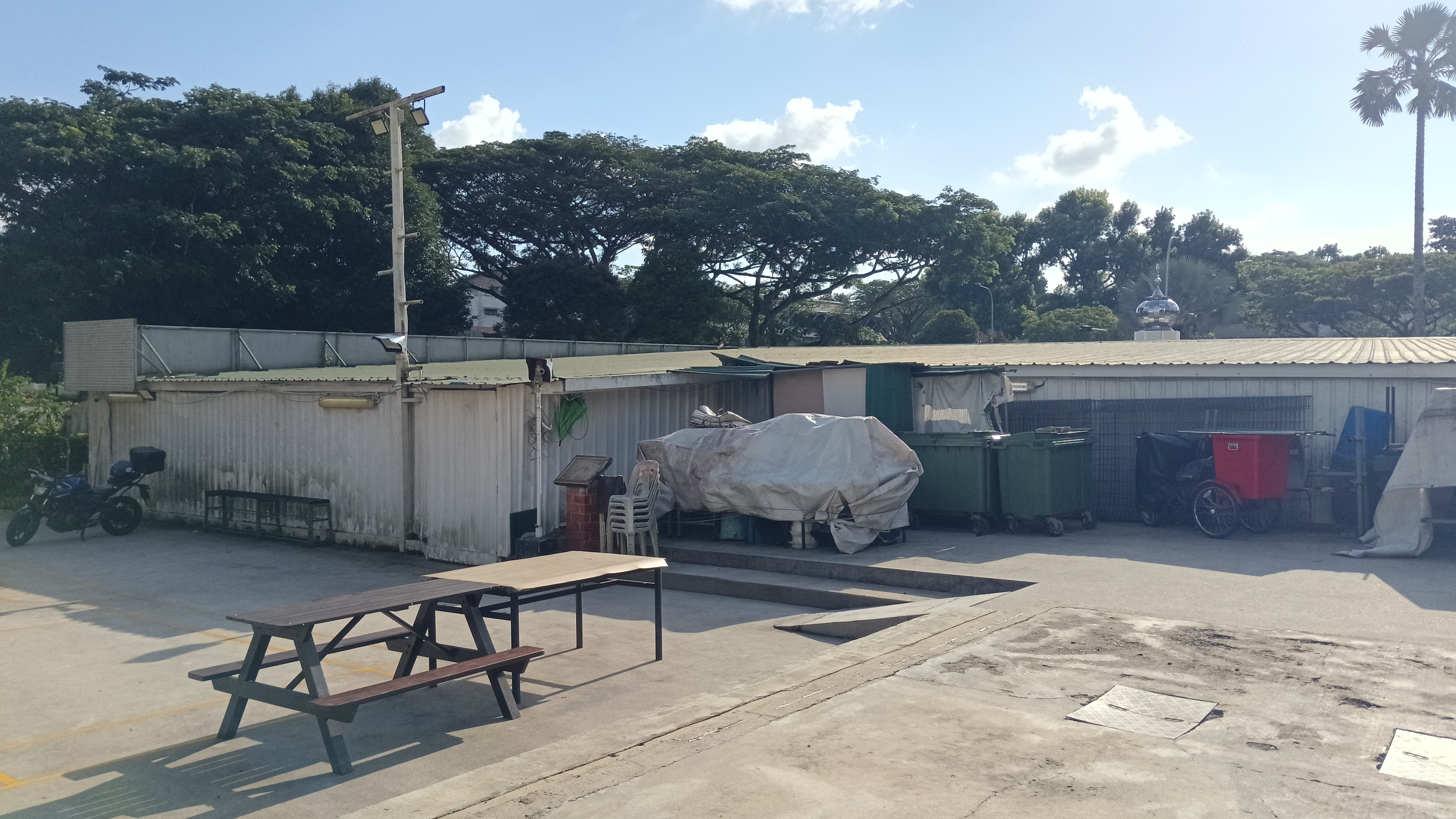
A recreational space behind the mosque.

== Transportation ==
Masjid Ahmad Ibrahim is situated within the Springside housing estate that is located in Yishun, opposite the Nee Soon military camp. The nearest MRT station to the mosque is the Springleaf MRT station on the Thomson–East Coast Line.
