= Masjid Petempatan Melayu Sembawang =

Historic mosque in the north of Singapore

Sembawang Malay Settlement Mosque Masjid Petempatan Melayu Sembawang مسجد مستوطنة سيمباوانغ الملايوية
- The mosque, as seen from Jalan Mempurong, in 2026.

- Location in Singapore

Religion
- Affiliation: Sunni Islam

Location
- Location: 27B Jalan Mempurong, Singapore 759055
- Country: Singapore
- Coordinates: 1.4588769°N 103.8416727°E

Architecture
- Type: Congregational mosque
- Style: Local, Malay architecture
- Completed: 1963
- Dome: 1

The Sembawang Malay Settlement Mosque (Malay: Masjid Petempatan Melayu Sembawang) is a historic congregational mosque situated along Jalan Mempurong within Sembawang, Singapore. It is notable for its rural, largely forested location and its status as being one of the last surviving village mosques in the country. The mosque was built in 1963 by residents of former settlements in the area.

== Etymology ==
The mosque is accordingly named after the former coastal villages that once stood in the northernmost forested areas of Sembawang, all of which were mostly dominated by Malay Muslims by 1960.

== History ==
The Sembawang Malay Settlement Mosque was built in 1963 at the end of Jalan Mempurong by residents of the Malay settlements that stood along the northern coast of Sembawang. They included Kampong Wak Hassan, Kampong Tanjong Irau and the Bomb Hole Village, all of which were served by this congregational mosque. It was also built in phases, originating as a surau, with the verandah, patio, dome and minaret of the mosque being added at a later stage. By the end of the 1980s, all of the villages in the vicinity of the mosque were torn down for future redevelopments, while the mosque itself was preserved and spared from demolition. The building was also given a Temporary Occupation License, awarded to the Majlis Ugama Islam Singapura (MUIS) from the Singapore Land Authority, which meant that regular lease payments were required for the mosque to remain on the state-owned land.

The main prayer hall of the Sembawang Malay Settlement Mosque.

The Sembawang Malay Settlement Mosque was closed down on 12 March 2020 as part of a nationwide closure of mosques during the COVID-19 pandemic. It was reopened in 2021, but closed down again on 27 April of that year for disinfection procedures after one of its congregants had reportedly caught a strand of the virus. By 2024, the mosque had been reopened to the public. When asked about the preservation of the mosque, the Member-of-Parliament for Sembawang, Ong Ye Kung, promised to work with the Urban Redevelopment Authority to ensure that the Sembawang Malay Settlement Mosque would be preserved until the 2030s.

== Significance ==
The Sembawang Malay Settlement Mosque is considered to be the last of the surviving village mosques in Singapore, preceded by Masjid Ahmad Ibrahim and succeeded by Masjid Omar Salmah. The mosque features a traditional architectural style that is commonly used for a classic Malay village house, with a simplistic design and a tiered metal roof, both of which add to the village aesthetic of the mosque and help it stand out from the futuristic and modernist designs of most mosques in residential areas. The wooden support beam in the centre of the main prayer hall is known as a "tiang seri" and is a common feature in local forms of Malay architecture.

The mosque is also notable for being located in a secluded, forested and barely populated area. Its location, as well as its classical style, makes it attractive for visits from both the residents of the city, as well as tourists. It is also the northernmost mosque in Singapore with a close proximity to the Sembawang Park. There are no historical landmarks nearby the mosque, with the exception of a preserved gateway that was once part of a large bungalow in the area.

== Transportation ==
The Sembawang Malay Settlement Mosque is accessible from both Jalan Mempurong and Jalan Selimang, with the latter being the shorter route to access the mosque. There are no forms of public transport in the immediate vicinity of the mosque, while the nearest bus stop serves Andrews Avenue.

== See also ==
- Islam in Singapore
- List of mosques in Singapore
