= Yishun Pond Park =

Urban park located in Yishun, Singapore

- Location within Singapore
- Type: Urban park
- Location: Yishun, Singapore
- Coordinates: 1°25′40.4″N 103°50′23.0″E
- Area: 2.3 hectares (23,000 m^{2})
- Manager: National Parks Board
- Open: 2006; 20 years ago (renovated)
- Public transit: NS13 Yishun
- Website: www.nparks.gov.sg/gardens-parks-and-nature/parks-and-nature-reserves/yishun-pond-park

Yishun Pond Park (or Yishun Pond) is an urban park located at Yishun, Singapore. It is situated along Yishun Central in front of Khoo Teck Puat Hospital and connects the residential areas to Yishun MRT station and Northpoint Shopping Centre.

The park features a large pond that serves as a recreational spot for residents and doubles as a water catchment area. Water from the pond is used in the irrigation system of Khoo Teck Puat Hospital.

The park was renovated in 2006 and is linked to Yishun Park via an 84-meter elevated bridge.

== Attraction ==
The 2.3 Hectares park features benches and a spiral tower that one can climb to the top for a bird eye view of the surrounding areas.

The large pond serves as a recreational spot for residents and doubles as a water catchment area.

Yishun Pond Park is linked to another park, Yishun Park, via an 84-meter elevated bridge.

== Flora and fauna ==
The park houses several magnificent trees including Ashoka trees, handkerchief trees, star-fruit trees, mangosteen trees, and jackfruit trees, to name a few.

The park's fauna comprises several exotic and local species including tawny coster butterflies, collared kingfishers, common flameback woodpeckers, the common little herons, and sun skink lizards, otters, among others.

== Accessibility ==
Parking is available at the hospital or the public housing area opposite to the park. A bus stop is right outside the park.

== See also ==
- List of parks in Singapore
