= Yishun Dam =

- Location within Singapore
- Official name: Yishun Dam
- Country: Singapore
- Location: Yishun
- Coordinates: 1.42387°N 103.86022°E
- Status: Operational
- Construction began: 1983; 43 years ago
- Opening date: 1984; 42 years ago
- Construction cost: S$60.8 million
- Owner: Public Utilities Board

Dam and spillways
- Type of dam: Earth fill dam
- Length: 975 m (3,199 ft)

Reservoir
- Creates: Lower Seletar Reservoir
- Catchment area: 352 ha

Yishun Dam (formerly known as Sungei Seletar Dam) is a dam in northern Singapore, built in 1984 as part of the Sungei Seletar and Bedok water scheme and forms the Lower Seletar Reservoir.

== History ==
In 1980, a study was conducted for a scheme to build two reservoirs in Sungei Seletar (now known as Lower Seletar Reservoir) and Bedok.

In 1983, a S$60.8 million contract was awarded to Loh & Loh Construction Pte. Ltd. from the Public Utilities Board (Singapore) for the construction of the dam.

The dam was completed on 28 April 1984, with dump trucks and bulldozers pushing sand to fill the last gap of the dam. The dual carriageway opened later in the year to motor traffic.

In May 2024, the Land Transport Authority announced plans to expand the road junctions at both sides of the dam, in response to concerns by nearby residents about the heavy traffic in the area during morning and evening peak hours. A new park connector will also be built along the dam, providing a dedicated cycling path for cyclists.

== Design ==
The dam stretches 975m across the mouth of Sungei Seletar, and incorporates a spillway system and slurry wall that controls the water flow and prevents seawater from the Straits of Johor from flowing into the reservoir. On top of the dam, a dual-carriageway links Yishun New Town to Seletar, providing access to Seletar Airport, Yio Chu Kang Road and Jalan Kayu
