= YCH =

YCH may refer to:

- Yan Chai Hospital, an acute hospital in Tsuen Wan, Hong Kong
- Yishun Community Hospital, a community hospital in Yishun, Singapore
- YCH, the IATA code for Miramichi Airport, New Brunswick, Canada
- Your Character Here, initialism often used in digital art auctions
