= Community gardening in Singapore =

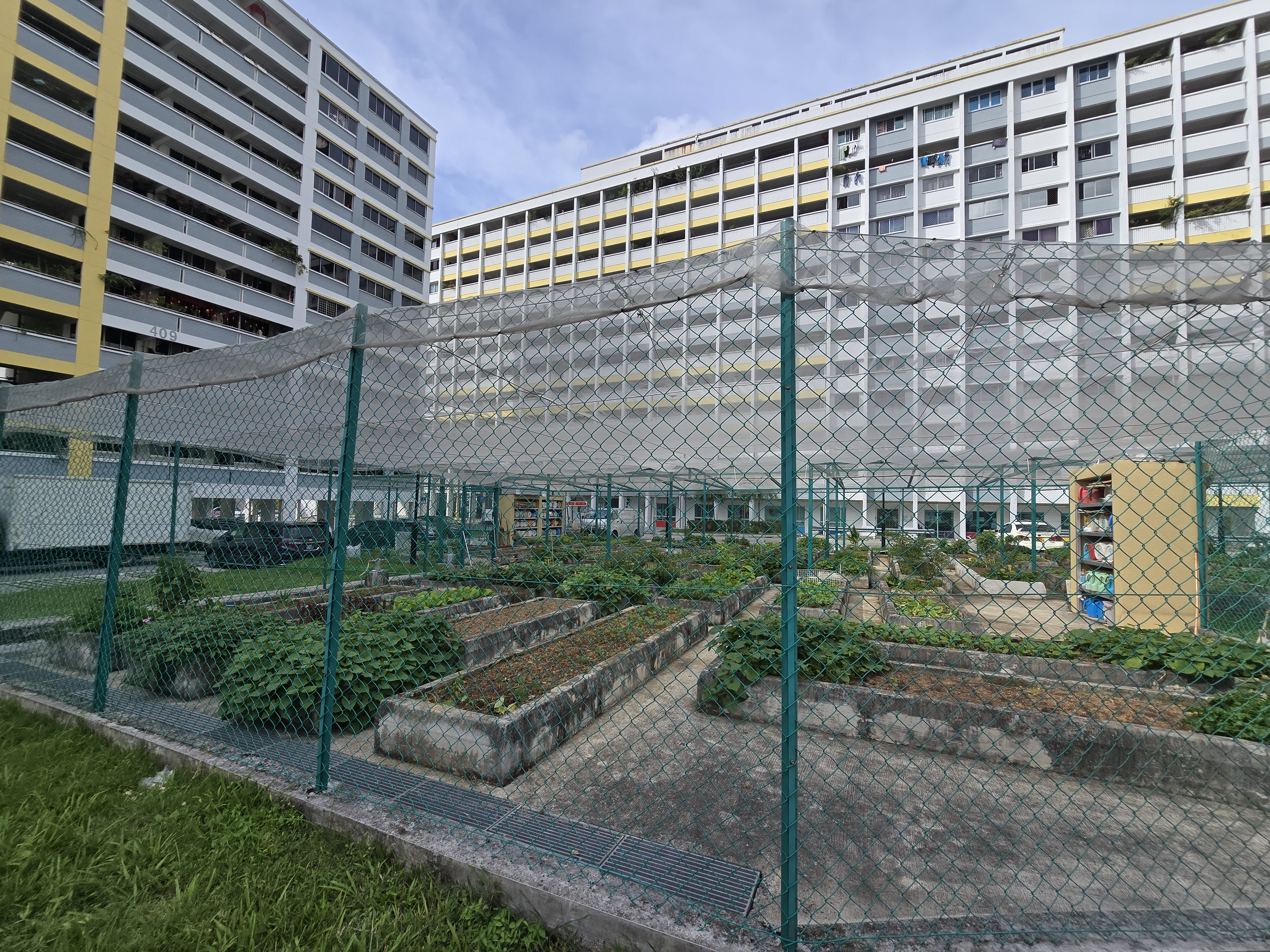
Bukit Panjang Zone 8 Residents Committee Community Garden in Bukit Panjang, Singapore

Community gardens in Singapore are communal sites located in a neighborhood that are individually or collectively gardened by a group of people. Community gardening has been practiced in Singapore since the country was under colonial British rule. Since then, it has changed from being a practice overseen by the government, to a citizen-led initiative by members of the community. In the present day, most community gardens in Singapore have been established as part of the 'Community in Bloom' (CIB) initiative of the National Parks Board (NParks), with allotment gardens and non-profit community gardens constituting the other types of community gardens in Singapore. A typical layout of a community garden consists of a fenced-off space with a number of edible and non-edible varieties cultivated in organized sections. They provide various mental health and social benefits to their users, while also promoting environmental education and supporting local biodiversity. As of 2025, there are over 2000 community gardens set up across Singapore.

== Overview ==
=== Location ===
Community gardens have been founded in residential estates, schools and private organizations across Singapore. In Housing and Development Board (HDB) public residential estates, community gardens can be found in vacant spaces around the estate, such as near void decks or on the rooftops of multi-story carparks. In private residential estates, which include condominiums or landed properties, community gardens are situated along the roadside or in shared green spaces. In schools and private organizations, community gardens are located in common areas inside or outside the compound.

=== Plant choice and physical layout ===
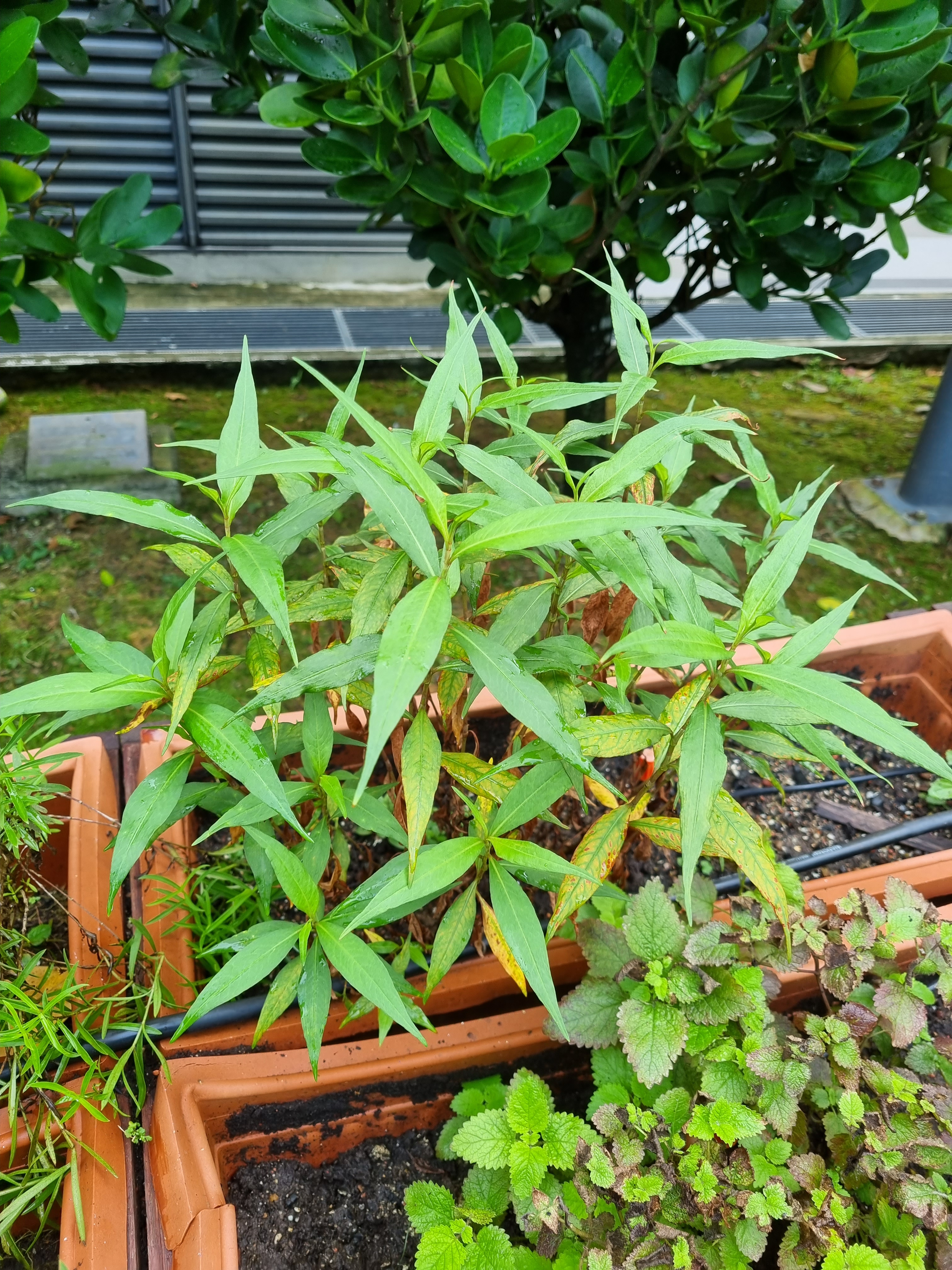
Laksa leaves grown in a community garden

The community gardens in Singapore are not primarily designed for agriculture, rather they serve recreation purposes for their users. A survey on community gardeners conducted by researchers from the National University of Singapore's Department of Biological Sciences showed that half of them viewed community gardening as "a form of leisure activity", and only 8% of them joined for the purposes of provisioning food.

A mixture of edible and non-edible plants is grown in community gardens. Based on a study from 2022, around 88% of the plants in community gardens are edible produce. Fruit crops are the most common type of edibles cultivated at community gardens, followed by leafy herbs and vegetables, then lastly with tubers being the least common. Other types of plants grown in community gardens include ornamental plants such as flowers.

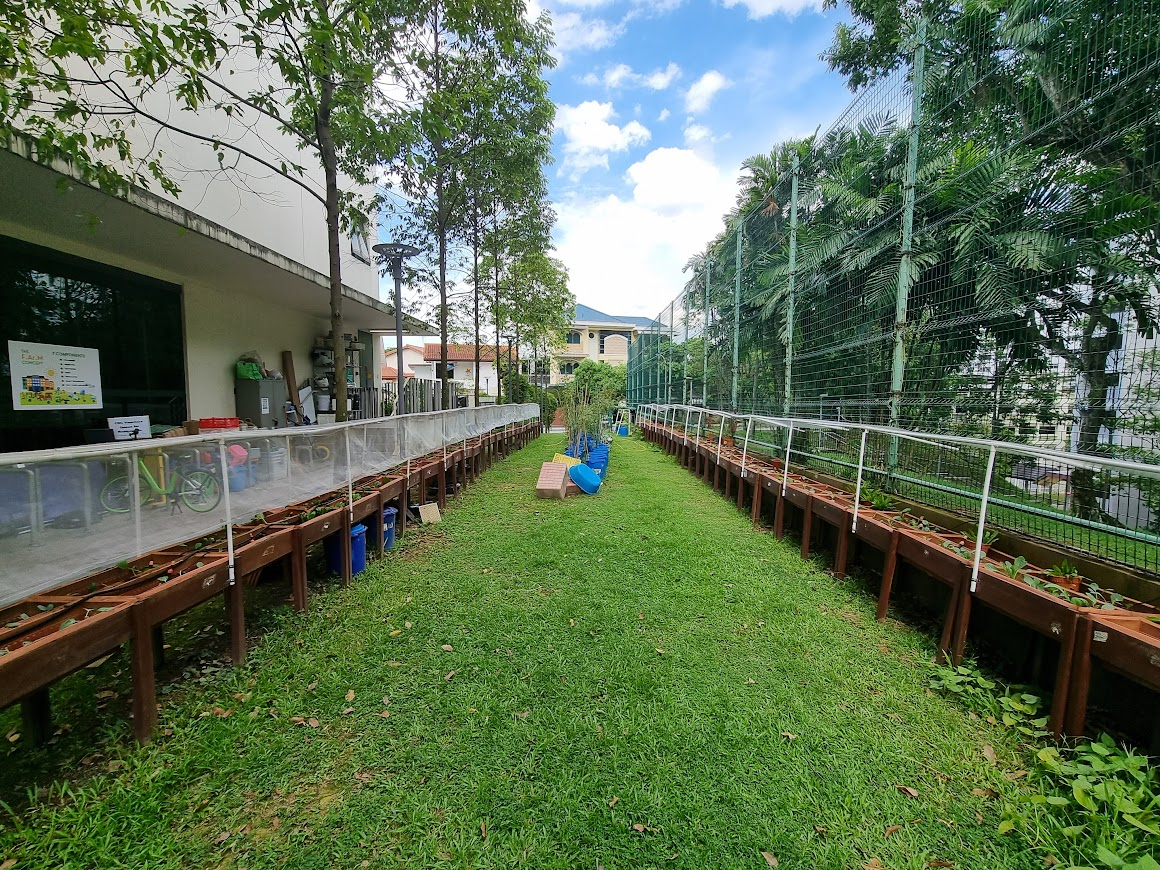
Kebun Bahru Community Club Community Garden in Kebun Bahru, Singapore

The layout and components of community gardens vary depending on where it is situated. Plants are either cultivated on raised beds or are directly planted on ground plots. A majority of community gardens in Singapore are surrounded by a fence with a locked gate in order to deter the damage and theft of crops. In terms of overall design, many community gardens in Singapore place heavy emphasis on the aesthetic appeal of the space. A study on the aesthetic sensibilities of community gardens in Singapore has noted that a majority of gardens are neatly organized and designed to be attractive to visitors. For example, production areas in the gardens are observed to be zoned according to matching physical characteristics of the plant and ornamental plants being strategically placed in places of high public visibility. According to the study, the focus on aesthetics in community gardens is influenced by the judging criteria in garden competitions as well as consultation with government officials.

=== 'Community in Bloom' program ===
The majority of community gardens in Singapore are registered under the CIB program by NParks. Citizens interested in starting a community garden under CIB have to form a group and approach their respective management committee (such as the head of a school or organization) before applying with NParks. Gardens registered under the CIB program receive assistance from NParks in matters such as site selection, management and garden design. Through the CIB program, over 2000 community gardens have been founded by citizens across Singapore.

Community gardens are managed and gardened by members of the community they serve. The gardens located in public housing are under the purview of the neighborhoods' local grassroots organization, the Residents’ Committee (RC). The community gardens situated in schools are managed by environmental student clubs. The daily gardening activities in these community gardens are managed by the chief gardener, who is supported by other members of the community garden. The chief gardener also imparts gardening knowledge to the rest of the garden members and guides them on horticultural practices.

Since 2005, NParks introduced the CIB Awards to recognize outstanding community gardens under the program. According to NParks, the award hopes to "encourage community gardeners to improve the standards of their gardens". Recipients of the CIB Awards are provided with cash or vouchers that can be used to purchase gardening materials. In 2008, NParks started the CIB Ambassador Awards to highlight the efforts of community garden members who have promoted interest in gardening in their respective communities.

The program is named after the 'Communities in Bloom' movement in Canada which encourages the beautification of green spaces across different communities in the country.

=== Allotment gardens ===
Community gardening is also carried out in allotment gardens in Singapore. Allotment gardens consists of a group of individual plots and are located in public spaces such as parks, gardens and the rooftops of multi-story carparks. They differ from community gardens set up through the CIB program as members of an allotment garden have greater autonomy to decide what to grow in their allotment plots and do not require forming a group to register for the program. Individuals may lease a plot consisting of a raised planter bed filled with soil that is 2.5m by 1m in size for up to 3 years.

Allotment gardens were introduced through the 'Allotment Gardening' scheme by NParks in 2016. As of 2025, there are over 2500 allotment plots situated across the island, with the largest allotment garden space at Jurong Lake Gardens consisting of 300 gardening plots.

== History ==
=== Pre-independence gardening ===
During the Second World War in 1939, the British colonial government, introduced the 'Grow More Food' campaign to promote public interest in vegetable farming. The campaign continued during the Japanese Occupation when people started to grow fruits and vegetables around the compounds of their houses and along roadsides as part of the Japanese three-year Food Sufficiency Plan.

The campaign was later brought back by the British Military Administration (BMA) after they retook Malaya. The BMA encouraged the creation of vegetable gardens by providing subsidies of seed and land, and organizing exhibitions for gardeners to showcase the vegetables from their plots.

=== Government-led community gardening ===
The 'Garden City' project was launched in 1967 by Prime Minister Lee Kuan Yew. Lee aimed to remake Singapore's image as an economically robust and socially disciplined society through this greening effort of Singapore's landscape. The creation of gardens around the island was also meant to rekindle the "kampong spirit" (the feeling of neighborliness) as Singaporeans moved from kampong villages to HDB flats after the late 1960s. A Garden City Action Committee was subsequently formed in 1970 to plan and coordinate greening policies in Singapore.

In the 1980s, the Singapore government planted fruit trees in the communal spaces of public residential estates for the residents to nurture the trees collectively, under the charge of RCs. However, the RCs faced issues with harvesting large quantity of fruits and stopping the theft of fruits from the trees, leading to calls for the government to manage the situation.

In 1997, NParks started its Adopt-A-Park-Scheme, which allowed organizations, such as schools, to take charge of maintaining the greenery of certain plots in public parks. The government aimed for this scheme to promote a collective effort to green spaces among community groups in Singapore.

=== Rise of citizen-initiated community gardening ===
Before the establishment of the CIB program, several community gardens were set up by residents in neighborhoods across Singapore. In 1999, Kampung Senang Organic Farm facilitated the founding of the first community garden in Tampines. In 2002, a community garden that would become Jurong Sky Garden was started by residents of a public housing estate in Jurong East.

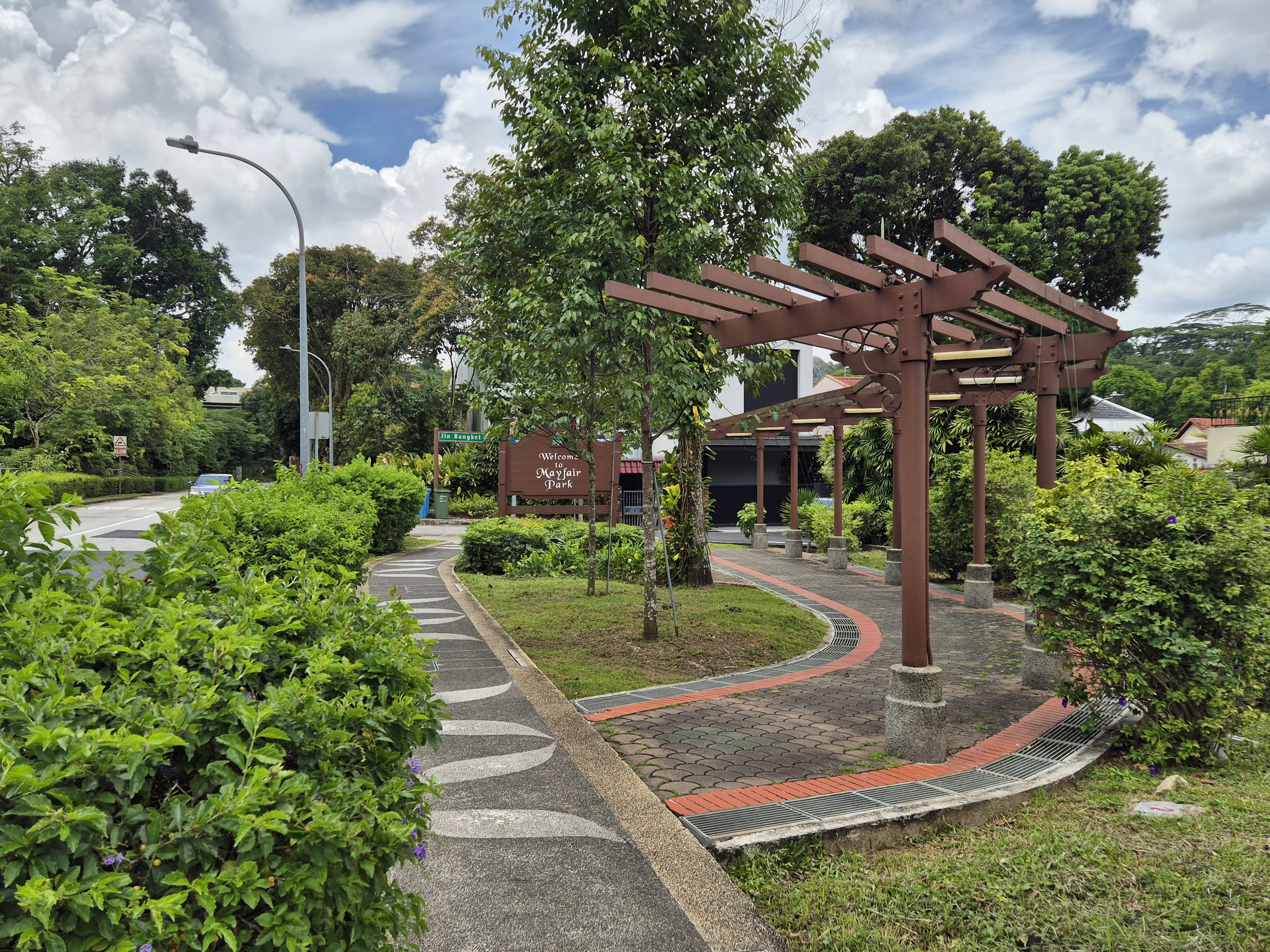
Mayfair Park Neighbourhood Committee Community Garden in Bukit Timah, Singapore

In 2004, the Garden City Action Committee remarked on the importance of citizen involvement in national gardening efforts in order to ensure the sustainability of such projects. The following year, in May 2005, the first community garden under the NParks' CIB program was opened in Mayfair Park Estate. The CIB program came about after residents from Mayfair Park Estate approached NParks for assistance in setting up their own community garden. Guides on starting a community garden were disseminated to the population through community clubs, RCs, as well as public libraries to support the development of community gardens around Singapore.

In 2015, the Community Gardens Edibles Competition was established. The event consists of a harvest competition which aims to encourage the exchange of gardening knowledge between community gardeners.

In 2016, the 'Allotment Gardening' scheme was launched by NParks which introduced allotment gardens to Singapore. It was piloted at HortPark with 80 allotment plots before expanding to other neighborhoods across Singapore. Since its launch in 2016 to 2021, the number of allotment plots increased at a rate of 300 plots per year.

During the COVID-19 pandemic in 2020, NParks initiated the 'Gardening with Edibles' program to encourage home gardening of edible plants. Free packs of seed were distributed to over 800,000 households in Singapore through this program and digital gardening resources were created to support the gardening effort.

== Impact ==
=== Environmental ===
Community gardens serve as a place to educate children about nature by providing them with a space to connect with the natural environment. CIB Ambassadors act as mentors to teach children from kindergartens and schools about gardening and support them in setting up new gardens.

The sustainable practices of community gardens can encourage more environmental practices among its users. According to a study done at a non-profit organization that engages in community gardening, gardeners and visitors of community gardens are more likely to adopt green habits through observing the sustainable practices that are conducted at these spaces.

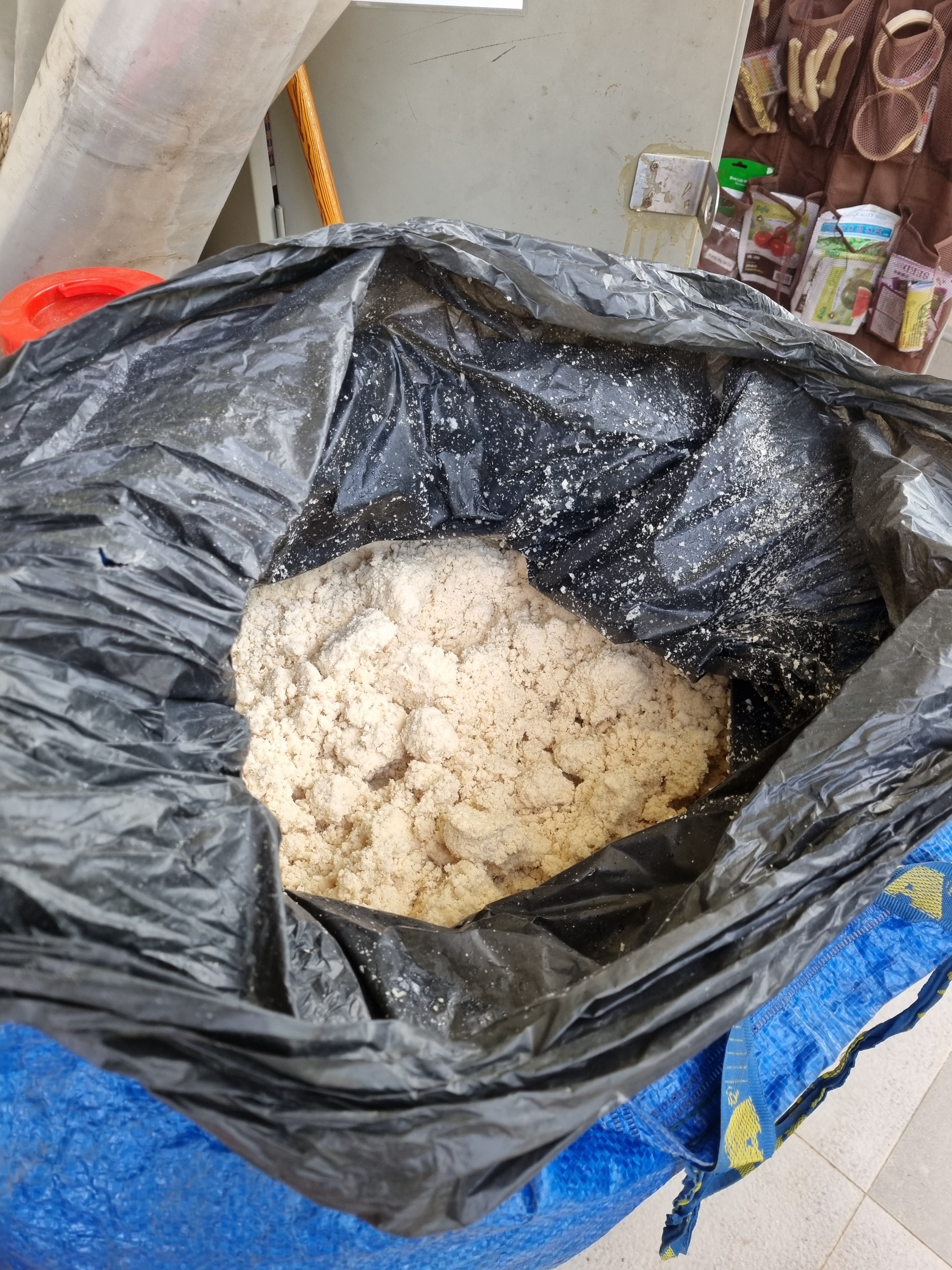
Food scraps, like soy pulp, are turned into compost at community gardens in Singapore

Community gardens provide a space to compost waste materials from around the community. Some common materials used for composting include coffee grounds, egg shells and food scraps. A study on food waste processing in Singapore has demonstrated composting to be a more environmentally friendly alternative to waste incineration.

As green spaces that are situated within an urban environment, the community gardens in Singapore can play a part in regulating temperature changes resulting from the urban heat island (UHI) effect. Green spaces, like community gardens, are able to reduce the impact of UHI through albedo and evapotranspiration. Additionally, gardens that are situated on rooftops have also been demonstrated to reduce the surface temperature of the building it is built on.

Community gardens also provide ecological benefits to various faunal species. A study on rooftop gardens in Singapore has shown that community gardens situated on rooftops support biodiversity such as birds and butterflies.

=== Health ===
Community gardening in Singapore provides various mental health benefits to its participants by promoting contact with nature. In the context of Singapore, gardening was shown to have increased mental resilience during the COVID-19 pandemic. According to a psychological study done on community gardeners in Singapore, community gardening was shown to have improved overall subjective well-being and sense of optimism, while having minimal impact on perceived stress levels.

=== Social ===
Community gardens foster community ties as a communal space for residents to interact with one another. They serve as a place for people from various backgrounds in the community to interact with each other. Gardening together with other members of the community inculcates shared responsibility over green spaces which promotes social cohesion.

The degree of inclusivity of community gardens set up under the CIB program has been debated in research on the topic. A case study on participation in community gardens in Singapore by the National University of Singapore noted that some residents have expressed reluctance to take part in garden activities because of the garden's association with governmental bodies, namely through RCs. Another study noted that some residential community gardens in Singapore have restricted the involvement of garden activities to mostly garden members, limiting the engagement of the wider community, in order to better control the quality of the garden.

Community gardening can also promote food resilience. While community gardens may not be able to contribute a significant portion of fresh produce, a study on the food production capabilities of community gardens has shown that they serve as important sources of food production materials in the event of a food crisis. Furthermore, community gardening transfers knowledge in gardening to the younger population which can prepare them to tackle any challenges in food supply.

== Examples ==
=== Green Hub ===
Green Hub is a community garden located in Bishan under the Bishan East Zone 1 RC. The garden was started in January 2020 with the aim of producing fruits to share with residents while promoting sustainability. Since its opening, the garden has expanded to occupy the void decks of neighboring HDB blocks to include spaces such as a library and recycling areas. Green Hub is also notable for having a community fridge that stocks produce from the garden as well as donated food items from the community.

=== Ground-up Initiative ===
Ground-up Initiative (GUI) is a non-profit organization located at Khatib that aims to promote a culture of sustainable living. They are made up of three units focused on farming, woodworking and earth oven baking respectively, with the farming unit being their most prominent. The farming unit at GUI frequently engages in community farming together with volunteers from the community to upkeep the farm site.

=== Woodlands Botanical Gardens ===
Woodlands Botanical Gardens was established in July 2020 by residents from the Marsling neighborhood. The community garden is situated along the slope of a small hill and is about 2500 square meters in size. It has over 200 species of flowering plants and hosts close to 80 types of butterflies. The garden holds an annual cultural music event called "Rhapsody" and partners with non-profit organizations like the Botanical Art Society of Society and the Association for Persons with Special Needs for other events. In 2022, Woodlands Botanical Gardens was awarded both the Platinum Award and Garden of the Year Award under the CIB program.
