= Khatib MRT station =

Mass Rapid Transit station in Singapore

Khatib NS14 卡迪 காதிப்
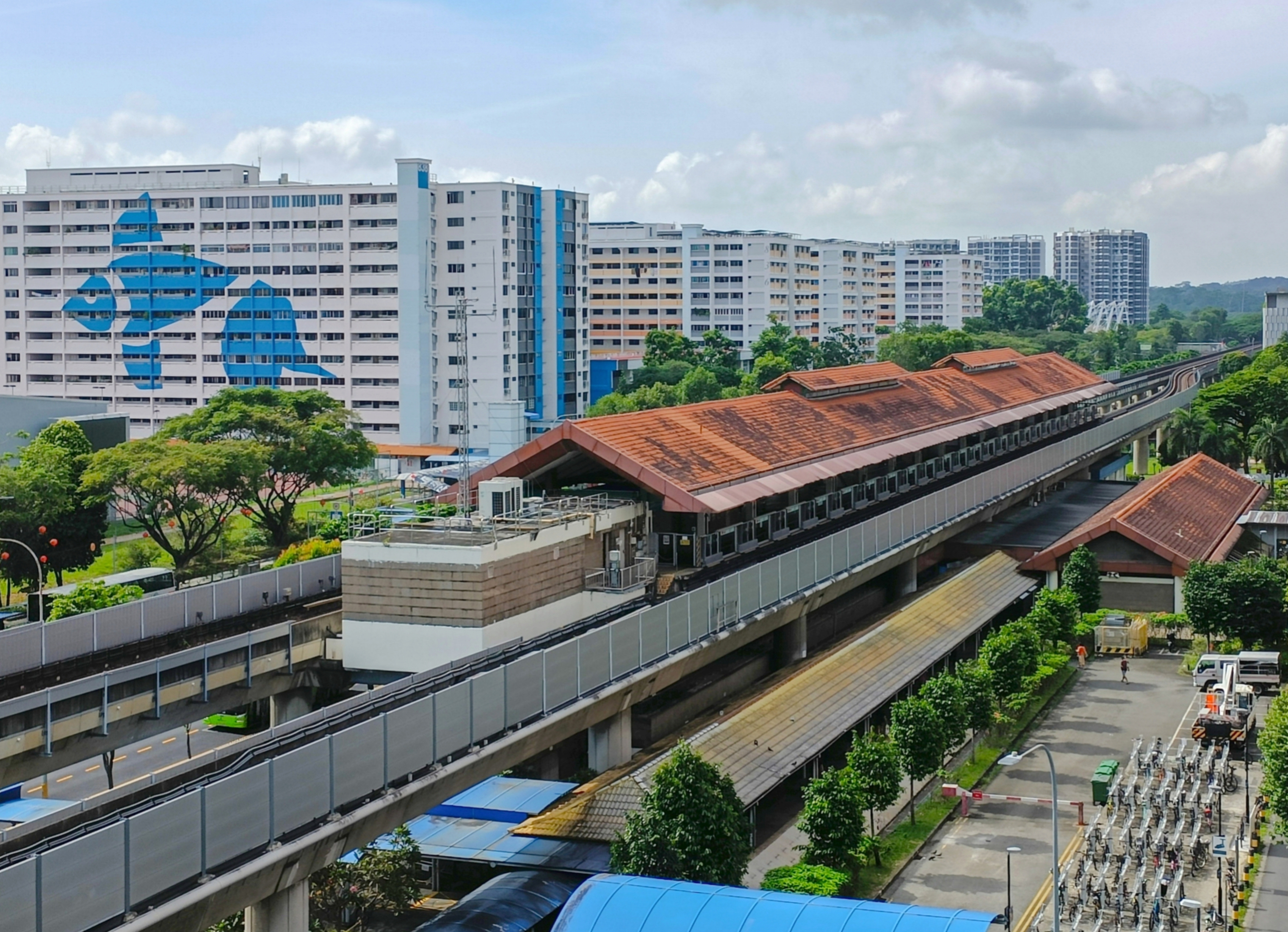
- Exterior view of Khatib MRT station

General information
- Location: 201 Yishun Avenue 2, Singapore 769092
- Coordinates: 01°25′01.80″N 103°49′58.44″E
- System: Mass Rapid Transit (MRT) station
- Owner: Land Transport Authority
- Operator: SMRT Trains
- Line: North–South Line
- Platforms: 2 (1 island platform)
- Tracks: 2
- Connections: Bus, Taxi

Construction
- Structure type: Elevated
- Platform levels: 1
- Accessible: Yes

Other information
- Station code: KTB

History
- Opened: 20 December 1988; 37 years ago
- Former names: Nee Soon South, Sembawang

Passengers
- June 2024: 31,459 per day

Services
Preceding station	Mass Rapid Transit	Following station
Yishun towards Jurong East	North–South Line	Yio Chu Kang towards Marina South Pier
Track layout
Location
- Location within Singapore Rail

Khatib MRT station is an above-ground Mass Rapid Transit (MRT) station on the North–South Line (NSL) located in Khatib, Singapore, a subzone in Yishun planning area.

The station is located at the junction of Yishun Ring Road and Yishun Avenue 2, and is one of the two stations that currently serve Yishun New Town; the other being Yishun station. The section of tracks between this station and Yio Chu Kang station is the longest between any two stations on the MRT network.

== History ==
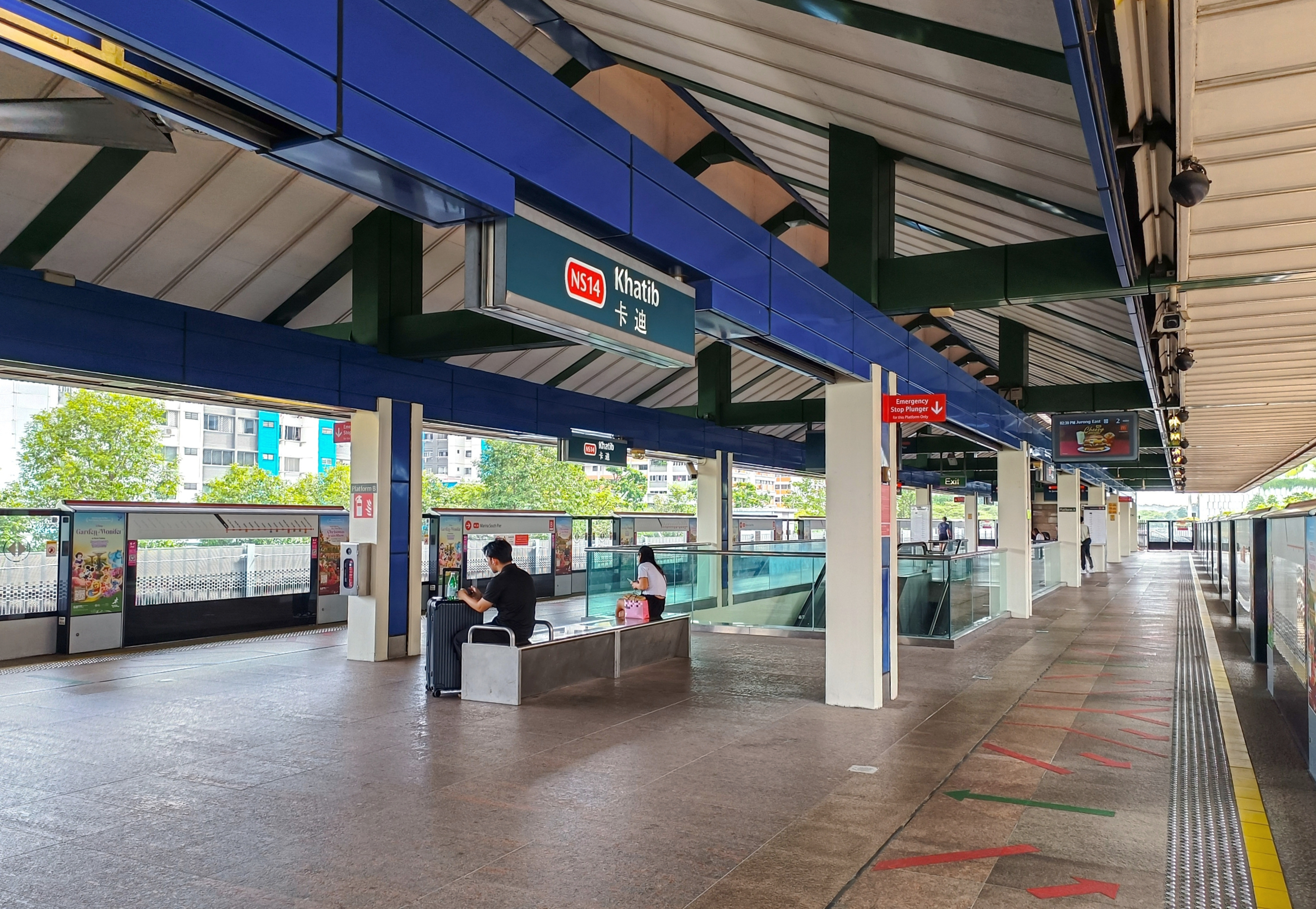
Platform level of the station.

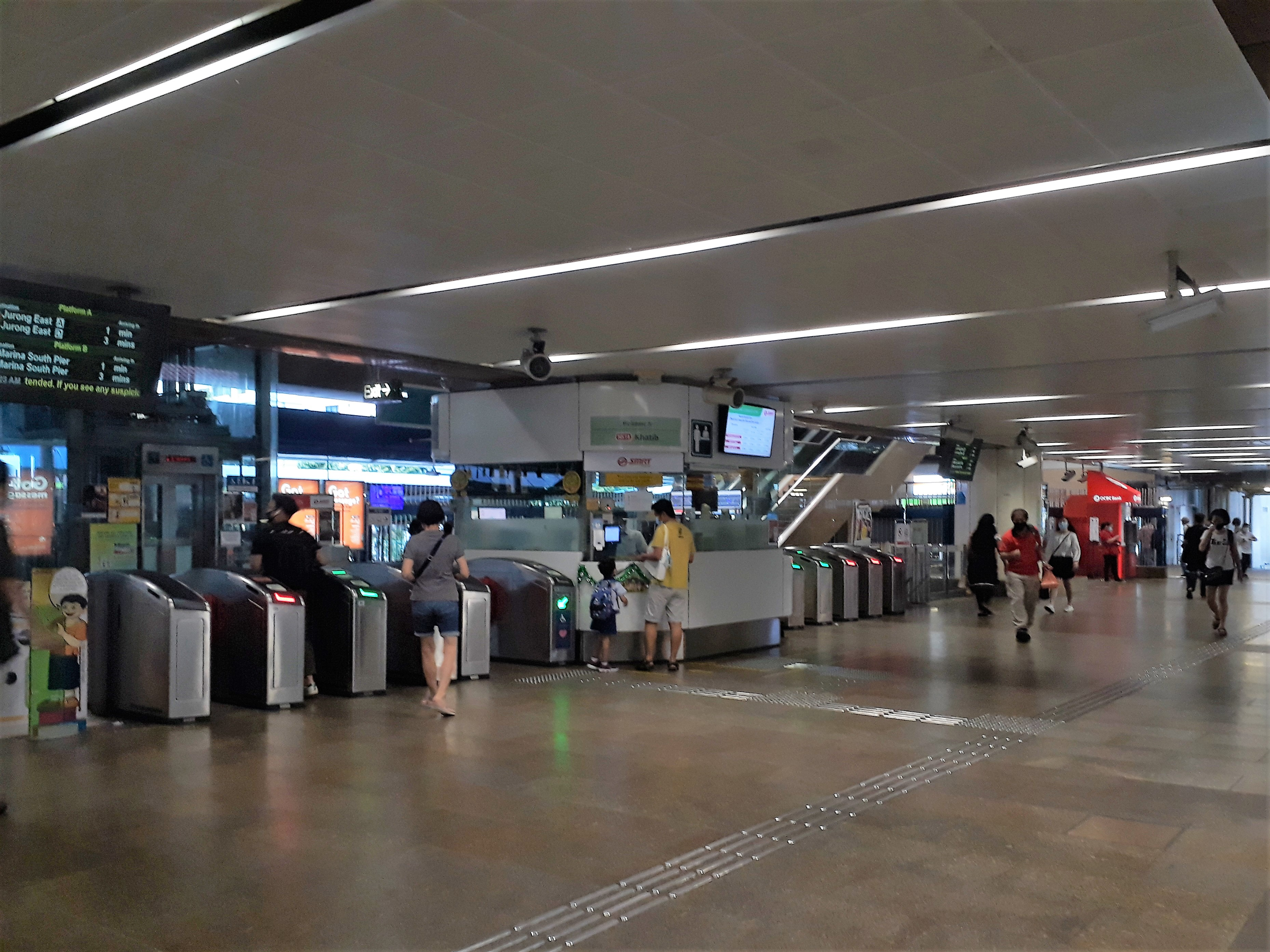
Concourse level of the station.

During construction, the station was named Nee Soon South and then Sembawang before adopting its current name of Khatib in January 1987 after Sungei Khatib Bongsu, a river nearby, and a military base nearby. In 1990, there was a power failure which occurred at Yishun station, affecting services at this station.

The construction bid, under Contract 402, which consists of viaducts between Yio Chu Kang and Yishun, as well as this site and Yishun stations, was awarded to a French company, GTM Coignet, in November 1985.

After several successful tests at the Jurong East, Yishun and Pasir Ris stations, installation of the half-height screen doors started and operations commenced on 30 September 2011. The station was installed with high-volume low-speed fans, which began operations since 28 August 2012.

As part of efforts to improve overall accessibility of public transport, the overhead pedestrian bridge near Khatib and other stations (Aljunied, Bishan, Sengkang, Kranji and Yew Tee) have lifts installed to improve barrier free accessibility to major transport nodes. The lifts were installed progressively, from the first quarter of 2013, with all completed by end 2013. Khatib station was also the first batch of ten stations (Note: The other stations are: Admiralty, Aljunied, Boon Lay, Chinese Garden, Lakeside, Sembawang, Sengkang, Simei and Yishun) to have additional bicycle parking facilities under a National Cycling Plan announced in 2010.
