= Yishun Community Hospital =

Hospital in Singapore

- National Healthcare Group

Geography
- Location: 2 Yishun Central 2, Singapore 768024, Singapore
- Coordinates: 01°25′26″N 103°50′14″E

Organisation
- Type: Community hospital

Services
- Emergency department: No Accident & Emergency
- Beds: 428

History
- Founded: 28 December 2015; 10 years ago

Links
- Website: www.yishuncommunityhospital.com.sg
- Lists: Hospitals in Singapore

The Yishun Community Hospital (Abbreviation: YCH) is a 428-bed community hospital in Yishun, Singapore. It is part of an integrated healthcare development that includes the Khoo Teck Puat Hospital (abbreviated to KTPH).
