= Yishun Park =

14-hectare park located in Yishun, Singapore

- Location within Singapore
- Type: Urban park
- Location: Yishun, Singapore
- Coordinates: 1.42429°N 103.84243°E
- Area: 13.9 hectares (139,000 m^{2})
- Opened: 20 January 1995; 31 years ago
- Manager: National Parks Board
- Public transit: NS13 Yishun
- Website: www.nparks.gov.sg/gardens-parks-and-nature/parks-and-nature-reserves/yishun-park

Yishun Park is a 14-hectare park located in Yishun, Singapore. It is within the vicinity of Northland Primary School, SAFRA Yishun Country Club and Yishun Park Hawker Centre. The park is connected to Yishun Pond Park by an 84-meter elevated bridge.

== History ==
Plans for the development of Yishun Park were first announced in November 1993, and the park was opened to the public in January 1995. Developed at a cost of S$2.7 million, the park occupied what was previously plantation and farm land, and retained most of the site's preexisting vegetation. Covering an area of 17 hectares (42 acres), the park featured a 12 metres (39 ft) tall hill with a stand of fruit trees, an area for the playing of board games that took after a Chinese chess board, a playground for children of different age groups, fitness stations, and a foot reflexology path.

In October 1997, the Minister of Defence released plans for the construction of a SAFRA clubhouse within the park. Occupying an area of 3 hectares (7.4 acres) and costing S$2.8 million to build, the clubhouse opened to the public in November 2000. In 2008, the Dipterocarp Arbotereum, a S$160,000 project comprising the planting of multiple dipterocarp trees and the installation of signs about the trees' heritage, was carried out in the park.

== Description ==
Developed on an old rubber estate, Yishun Park has a variety of rare Indo-Malayan trees (e.g. Shorea, Kapur, Chengal), tropical fruit trees (e.g. rambutan, durian, guava, starfruit) and numerous bird species are attracted by the park such as herons, egrets, migratory birds. There are also many rubber trees and fallen rubber seeds in the park.

The park also features an allotment gardening scheme hosted by the National Parks Board.

== See also ==
- List of parks in Singapore
