= Lower Seletar, Singapore =

Lower Seletar
- Subzone of Yishun, Singapore

Others transcription(s)
  - Chinese: 实里达下 (Simplified)
  - Malay: Bawah Seletar
  - Tamil: கீழ் செலிட்டர் Kīḻ celiṭṭar (Transliteration)
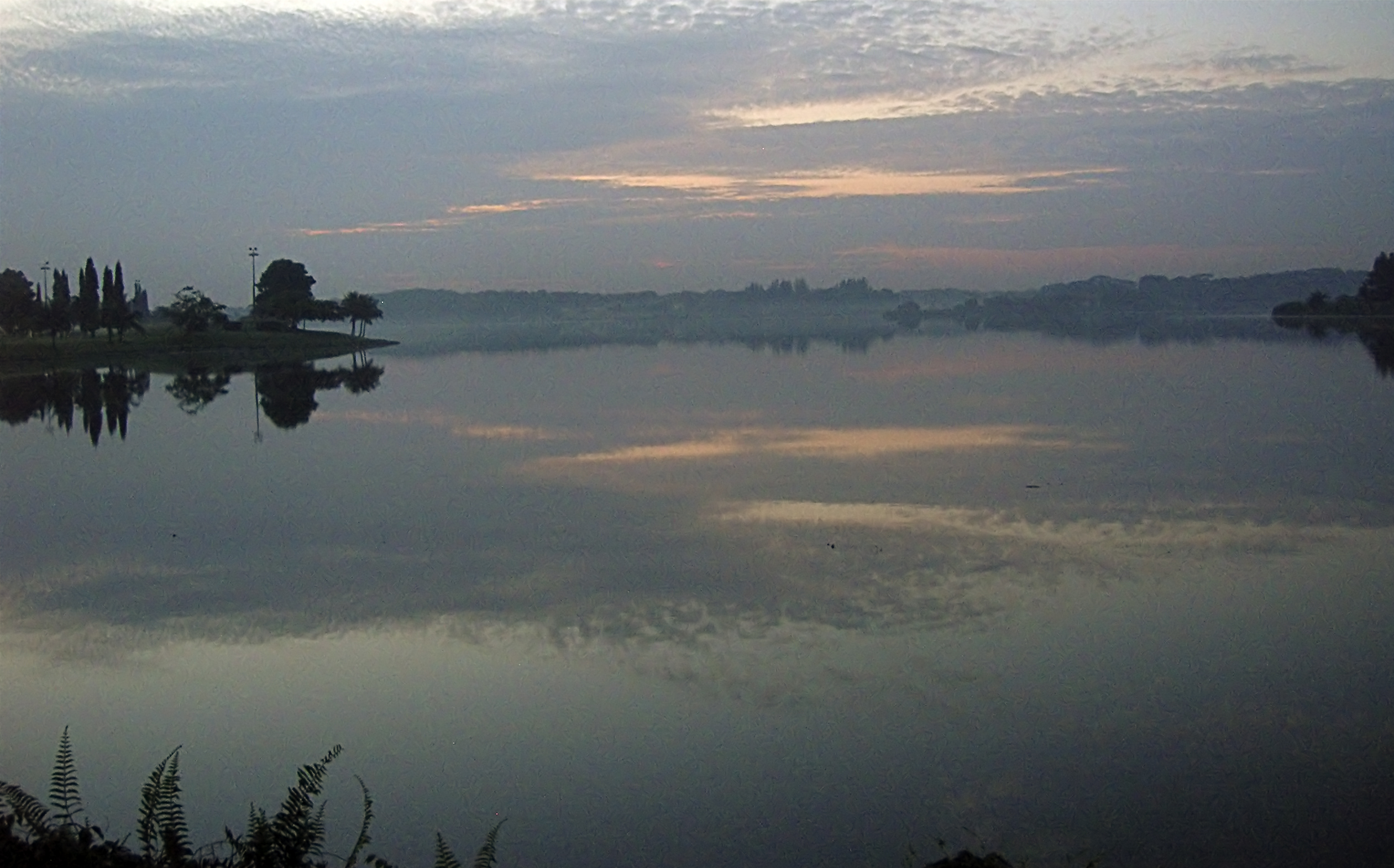
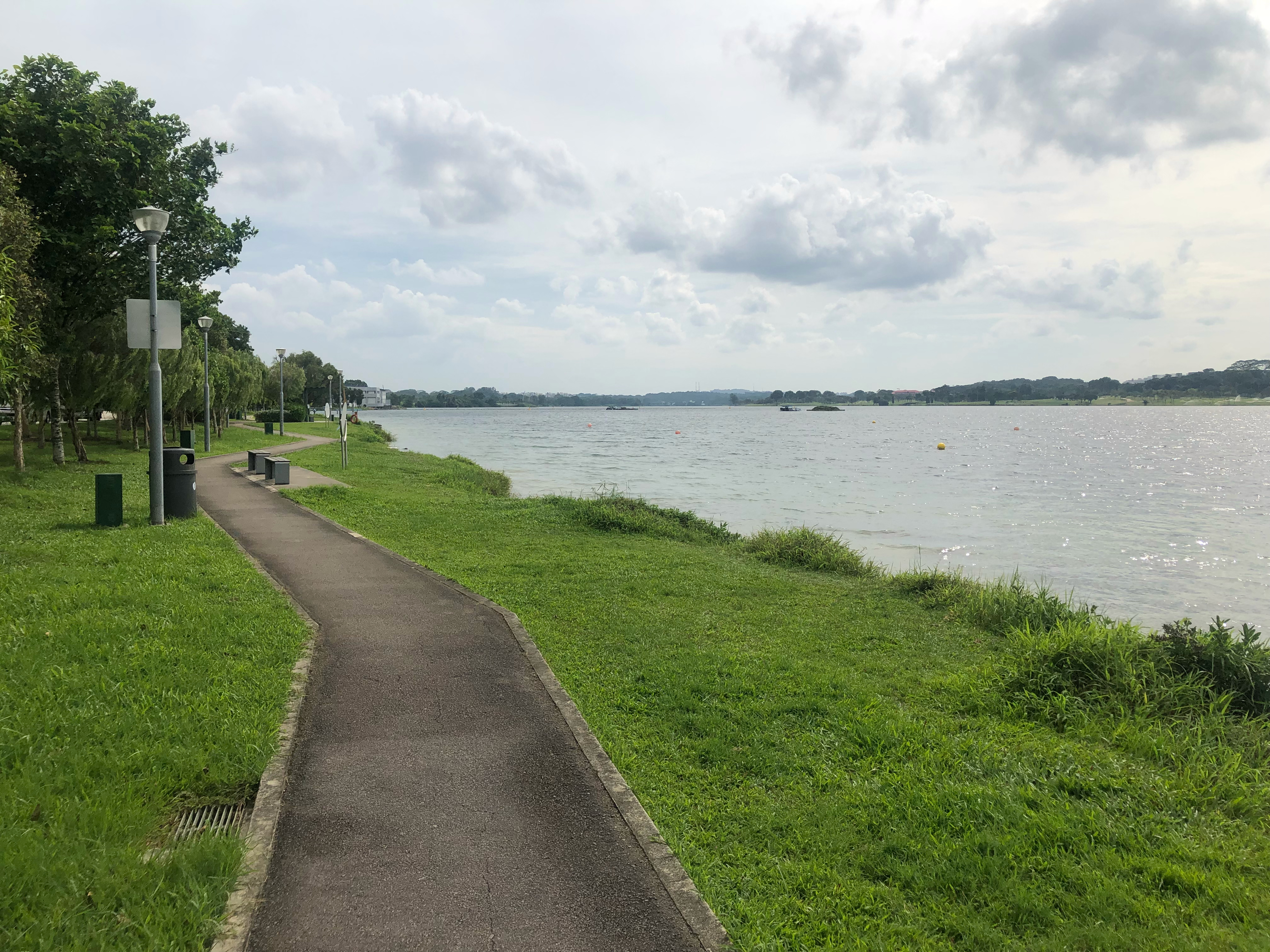
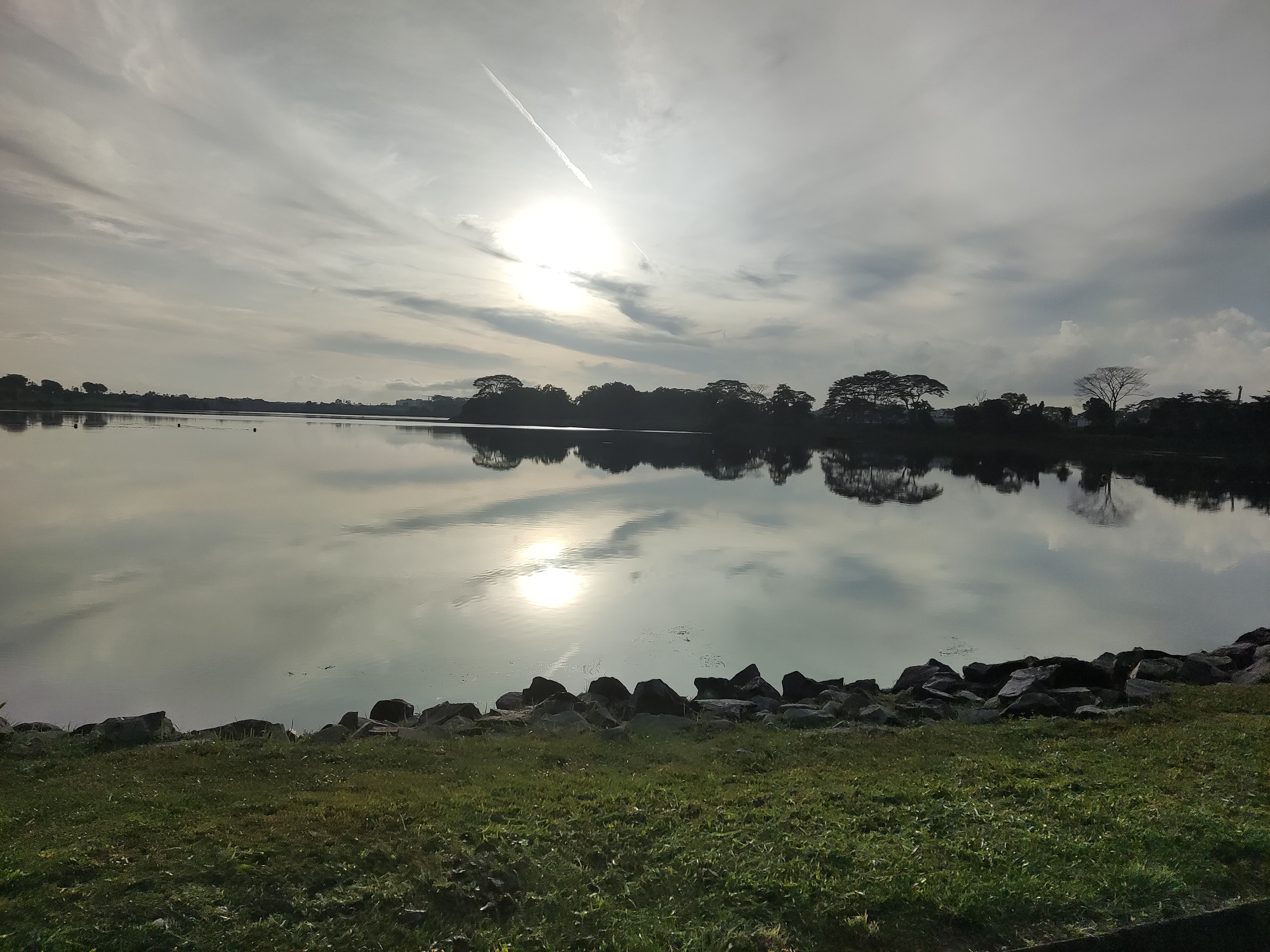
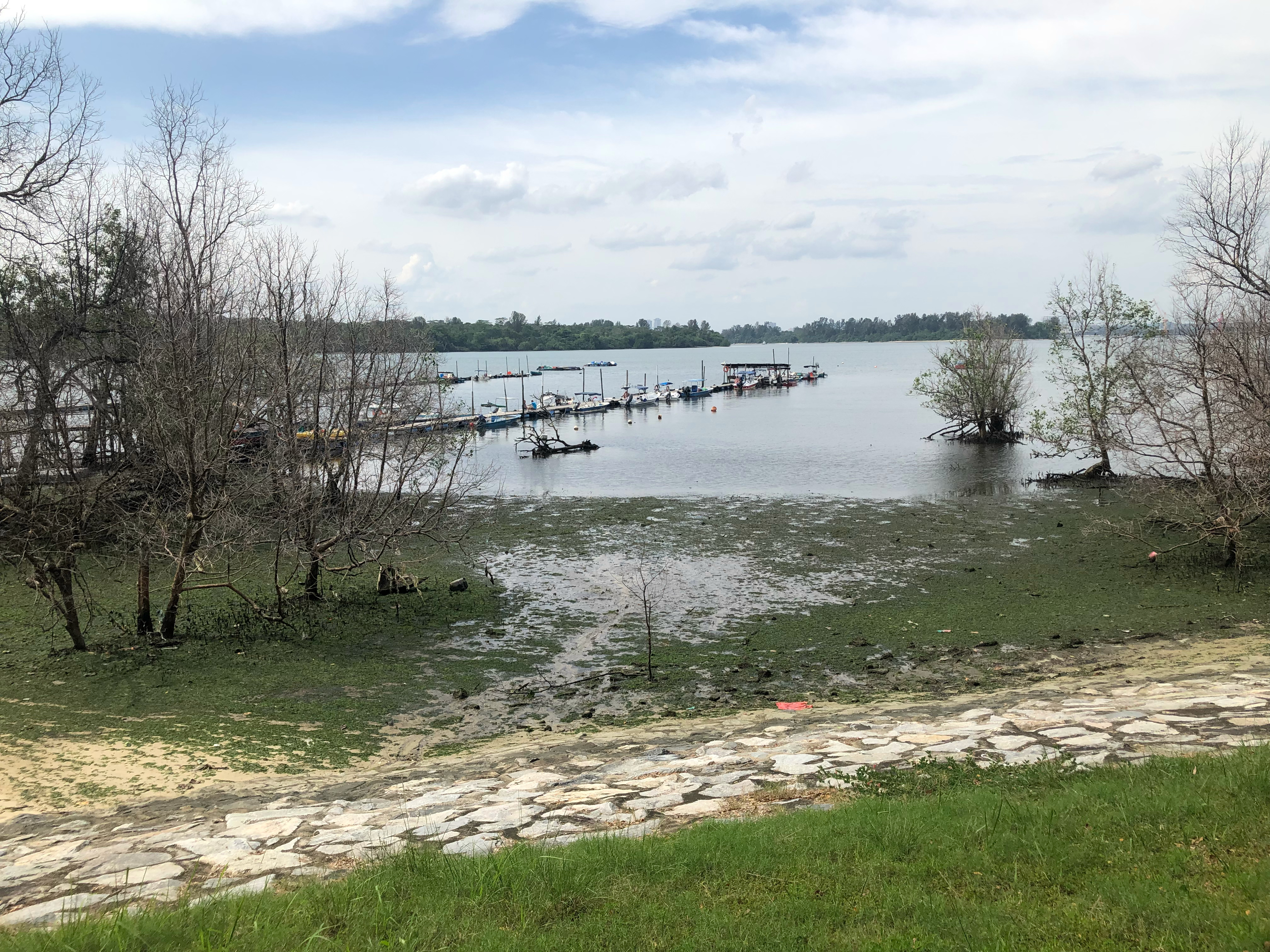
- From top left to right: Sunrise over Lower Seletar Reservoir, View of Lower Seletar Reservoir from Rower’s Bay Park, View from Yishun Dam, Jetty near Yishun Dam along Seletar West Link
- Country: Singapore
- Town: Yishun

Government
  - Member of Parliament: Carrie Tan

Lower Seletar is a subzone of Yishun, Singapore. It is bounded by Yishun Avenue 1/4 and Yishun Street 41/51 to the north, Seletar Expressway and Seletar West Link to the south, Yishun Avenue 1 to the east and Lentor Avenue to the west.

== Etymology ==
Lower Seletar is named from the planning area Seletar, which is located on the east of Lower Seletar. Seletar itself was named after the indigenous group that resided around the area before the 19th Century, the Orang Seletar The area is mostly taken up by Lower Seletar Reservoir, a reservoir constructed under the Sungei Seletar/Bedok Water Scheme

== Amenities ==
=== Hotel ===
- Orchid Golf & Resort Hotel - A 75-room hotel with views of the Aranda Course and Seletar Reservoir.

=== Country Clubs ===
- Orchid Country Club - Opened in 1993 and located near beside Lower Seletar Reservoir along Yishun Avenue 1. Member facilities include gym, swimming pool, golf driving range and tennis courts. Also offer accommodations and staycations.
- Seletar Country Club - Opened in 1930. Located on a hill overlooking Lower Seletar Reservoir and the Orchid Country Club.

== Recreation ==
A major park, Lower Seletar Reservoir Park is located at the southern edge of the housing estate bordering the northern edge of the reservoir. Facilities include a water sports rental facility. There are also two small parks, Rockridge Park and Rower's Bay Park. Yishun Dam is also located in Lower Seletar, at the north-eastern side of Lower Seletar Reservoir.
