= Lower Seletar Reservoir =

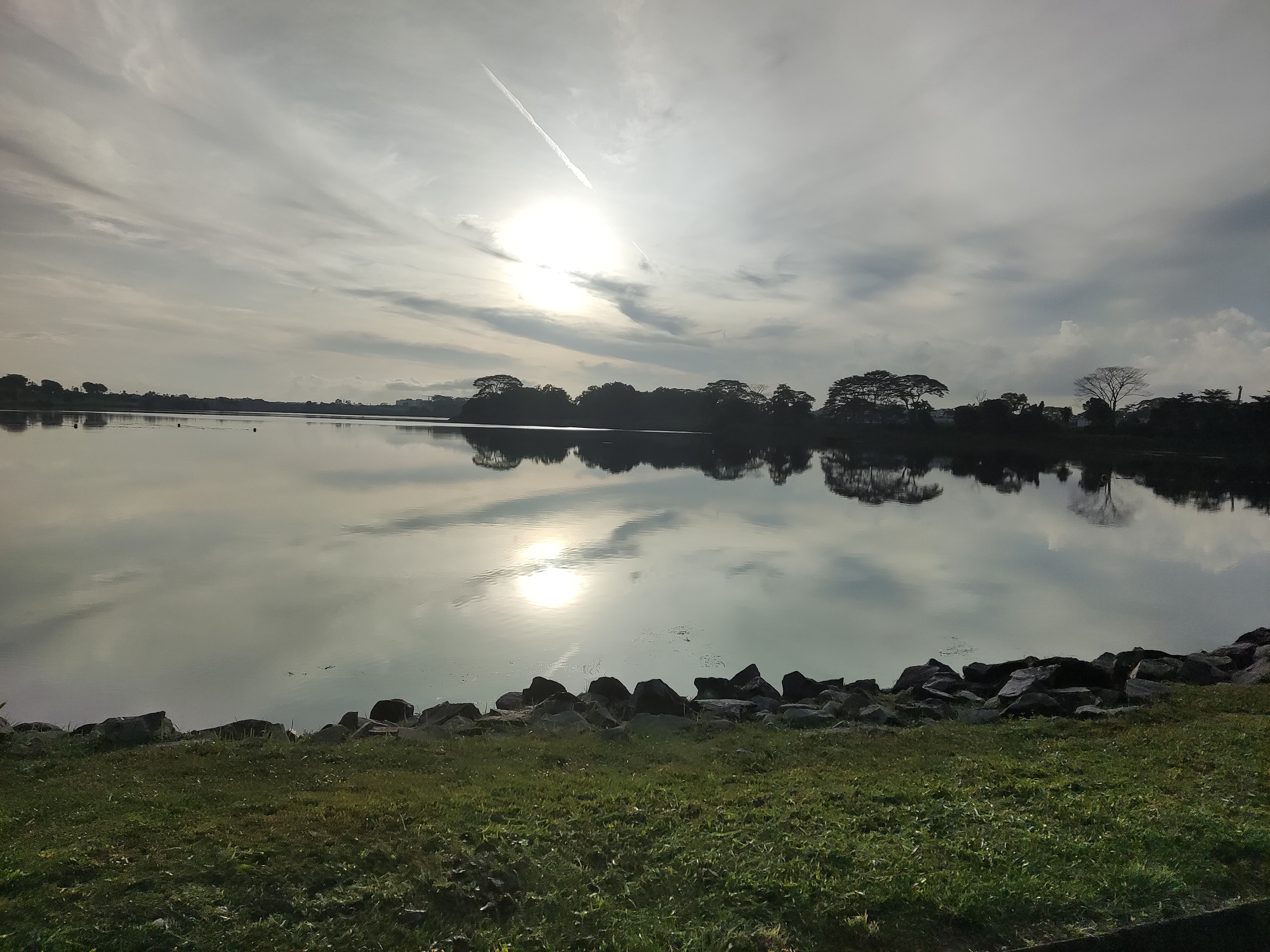
- Lower Seletar Reservoir

- Location within Singapore
- Location: Northeastern Singapore
- Coordinates: 1°24′15″N 103°50′23″E
- Type: Reservoir
- Basin countries: Singapore
- Surface area: 3.6 km^{2} (1.4 sq mi)
- Average depth: 2 m (6 ft 7 in)
- Max. depth: 5.5 m (18 ft)
- Water volume: 9.5 million cubic metres (7,700 acre⋅ft)
- Shore length^{1}: 14.3 km (8.9 mi)
- ^{1} Shore length is not a well-defined measure.

Lower Seletar Reservoir (Chinese: 实里达蓄水池下段; Malay: Takungan Air Seletar Bawah) is a reservoir located in the northern part of Singapore in the Lower Seletar subzone, located in Yishun New Town. The reservoir has a surface area of 3.6 km², and a capacity of 9.5 million m³. The mean depth of the reservoir is 2 m, with a maximum depth of 5.5 m. The shoreline length is 14.3 km.

== History ==
Lower Seletar Reservoir was constructed under the Sungei Seletar/Bedok Water Scheme, completed in 1986. The scheme involved the damming of Sungei Seletar to form Lower Seletar Reservoir, the creation of Bedok Reservoir from a former sand quarry and the construction of Bedok Waterworks. Its unique feature was the construction of nine stormwater collection stations to tap the storm runoffs of the surrounding urbanised catchments. Eight of these collection stations are ponds at Yishun, Tampines, Bedok and Yan Kit.

== Present ==
In 2004, Public Utilties Board (PUB) allowed sailing at Lower Seletar Reservoir. This was done in collaboration with the Singapore Sports Council (SSC) and the Seletar Country Club. This is the first time sailing was introduced in local reservoirs. Sports fishing is also carried out at designated areas of the Lower Seletar Reservoir.

In 2024, an estuarine crocodile was spotted swimming near the dam, captured in a video that went viral.

== See also ==
- Upper Seletar Reservoir
- List of Parks in Singapore
- Lower Seletar, Singapore
