= Khatib, Singapore =

Subzone of Yishun, Singapore

Khatib
- Subzone of Yishun, Singapore

Others transcription(s)
  - Chinese: 卡迪 (Simplified)
  - Malay: Khatib خاطب
  - Tamil: கதீப் Katīp (Transliteration)
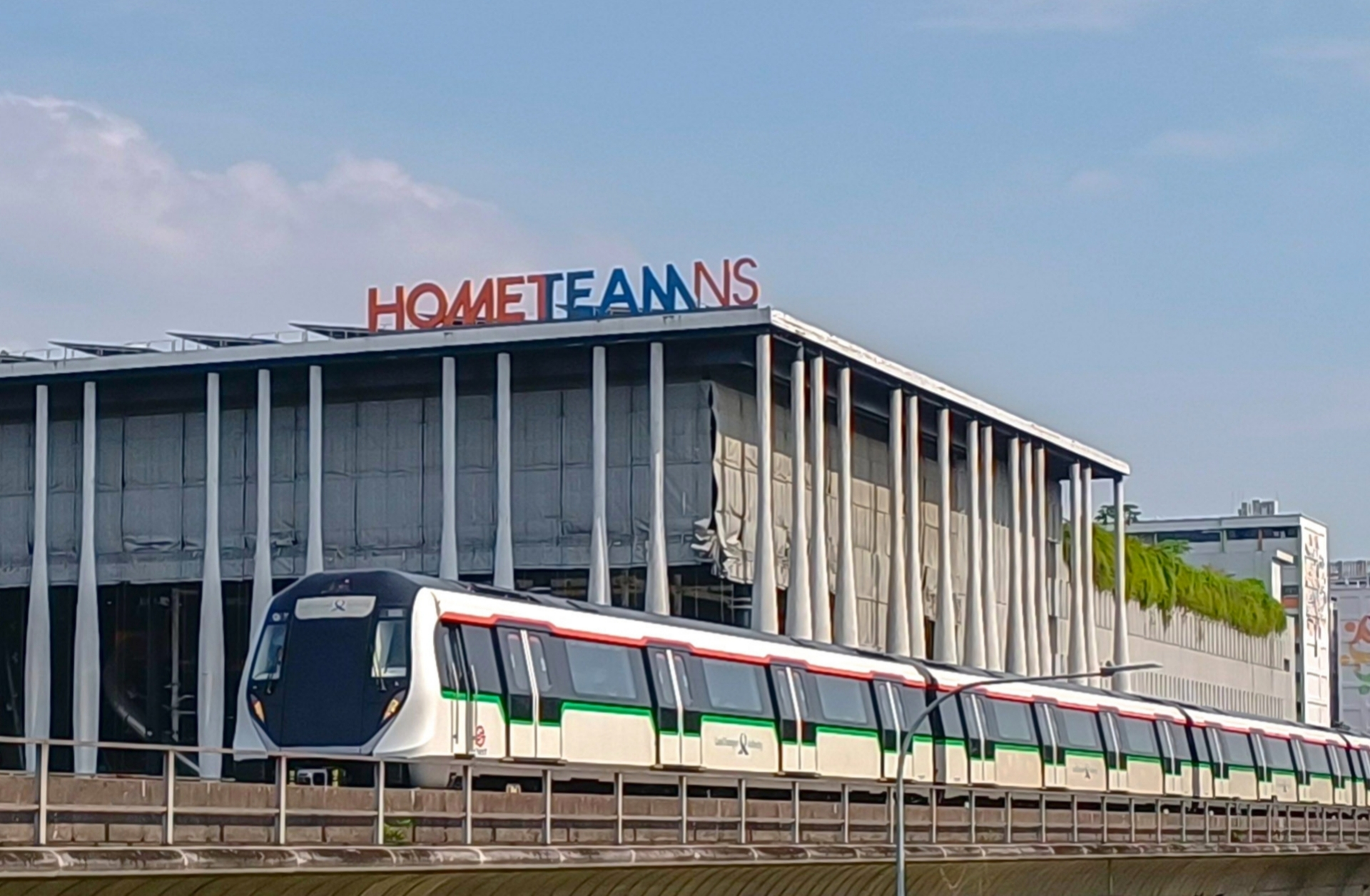
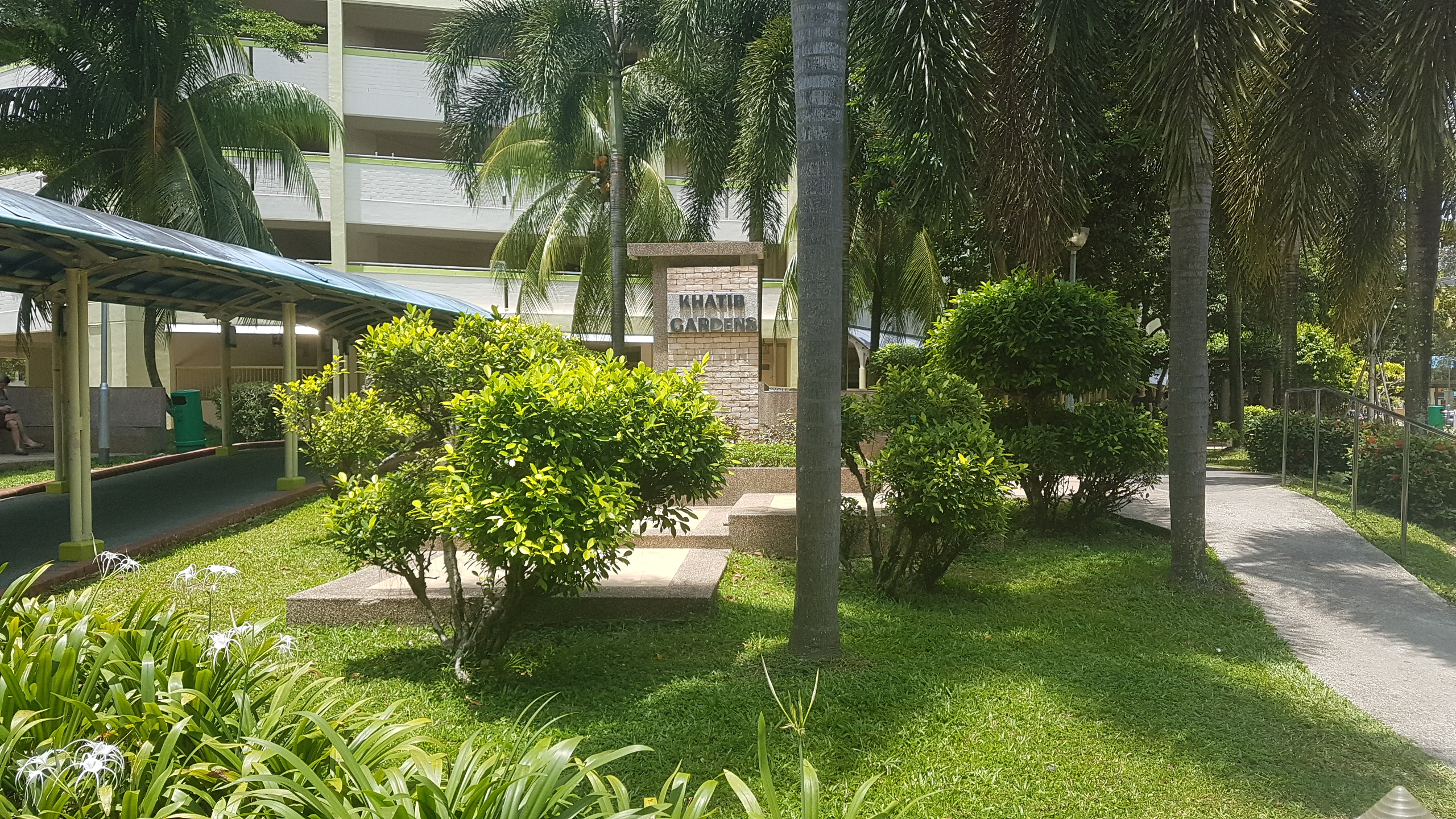
- From top to bottom: View of HomeTeamNS Khatib and Khatib Gardens HDB Estate
- Interactive map of Khatib
- Country: Singapore
- Town: Yishun

Government
  - Member of Parliament: Lee Hui Ying

Khatib is a subzone of Yishun, Singapore. It is bounded by Yishun Avenue 1/2/3 to the south, east and north respectively, and Sembawang Road to the west.

== Etymology ==
Khatib was named after the nearby Sungei Khatib Bongsu, located in Yishun East Subzone. The name "Khatib" originates from Arabic (Arabic: خاطب), referring to the person who delivers the sermon during Friday prayers and Eid Prayers. In most of the early- and mid-20th century, Khatib was mostly used for pineapple, rubber and gambier plantations owned by Lim Nee Soon, from which the Yishun residential town is named.

== Amenities ==
=== Leisure Areas ===
- HomeTeamNS — A non-profit association set up to recognise the contributions of National Servicemen in Singapore. Opened in August 2020 and has a wide range of amenities and various restaurants and shops.
- ORTO — ORTO was a 24-hour recreational destination known for fishing, prawning, and dining options. ORTO also catered for corporate events and weddings. It was closed down in mid-2023 to make way for housing developments in the future.

=== Transport ===
Khatib MRT Station: A Mass Rapid Transit (MRT) station serving as a transportation hub in the area. Located south of Yishun MRT station on the North-South line. It was formerly named Nee Soon South MRT station but was renamed to Khatib in January 1987 after Sungei Khatib Bongsu and Khatib Camp.

=== Other places ===
A small local park, called Yishun Park @ N8, is located beside Blk 810, Yishun Ring Rd. The park includes a fitness corner, playground and a running track. Two schools, Peiying Primary School and Naval Base Secondary School, can be found in Khatib, along with Khatib camp, a military base. Places of worship in Khatib include Teong Siew Wei Ling Dong Shan Temple.

== Politics ==
Khatib is a subzone located within the larger Yishun planning area in Singapore. Khatib is currently part of the Nee Soon South Parliamentary Constituency within the Nee Soon Group Representation Constituency (GRC), helmed by the current ruling party, People's Action Party (PAP). Nee Soon South Parliamentary Constituency is overseen by Member of Parliament Lee Hui Ying.
