= Lim Nee Soon =

Singaporean businessman

- 林義順
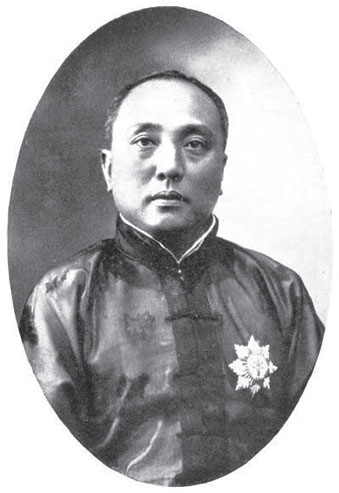
- Born: 12 November 1879; Singapore, Straits Settlements
- Died: 20 March 1936 (aged 56); Shanghai, China
- Resting place: Nanjing, near Sun Yat-sen Mausoleum
- Education: Anglo Chinese School
- Occupations: Banker; businessman
- Spouse: Wi Peck Hay
- Children: 9
- Parent(s): Lim Peng Nguan (father); Teo Choon Lian (mother)
- Relatives: Teo Lee (grandfather); Tan Poh Neo (grandmother); Teo Eng Hock (uncle); Teo Chee Hean (grandnephew)

Chinese name
- Traditional Chinese: 林義順
- Simplified Chinese: 林义顺
- Hokkien POJ: Lîm Gī-sūn
Transcriptions
Standard Mandarin
- Hanyu Pinyin: Lín Yìshùn
Yue: Cantonese
- Yale Romanization: Làhm Yih-seuhn
Southern Min
- Hokkien POJ: Lîm Gī-sūn

Lim Nee Soon (Chinese: 林義順; Peng'im: Lim^{5} Ngi^{6}sung^{6}; pinyin: Lín Yìshùn; 12 November 1879 – 20 March 1936) was a Singaporean banker and businessman who promoted social and community matters, and was a respected community leader in Singapore. Lim was of Peranakan descent, with ancestry from Chenghai District, Shantou in Guangdong, China.

He was a rubber magnate and was nicknamed the "pineapple king" for being the leading pineapple planter in the region. He was also a banker, contractor and general commission agent. He was the first general manager of the Bukit Sembawang Rubber Company Limited, formed in 1908. Nee Soon and Company was formed in 1911.

As a Chinese Peranakan, known as "Baba" locally, he was affectionately known as Bah Soon Pah (Chinese: 峇順芭; pinyin: Bā shùn bā). Bah Soon Pah Road was named after him.

== Early life ==
Lim Nee Soon was born in Kampong Glam, Singapore. His family was from Shantou, Guangdong, China. His father died when he was eight and his maternal grandfather, a merchant, took care of him. Lim was educated in English at the St. Joseph's Institution, and then later, at the Anglo Chinese School.

== Career ==
Lim was one of the pioneers that opened up Sembawang. He served on the Rural Board from 1913 to 1921 and was also appointed a Justice of Peace. In the field of education, he was one of the founders of The Chinese High School and also a member of the Raffles College Committee. He was the President of the Singapore Chinese Chamber of Commerce for two periods, from 1921-1922, and 1925-1926.

== Later life ==
Lim, along with his uncle Teo Eng Hock, were the leading members of the Teochew clan association Teochew Poit Ip Huay Kuan, and was a close friend of Dr Sun Yat Sen.

He died on the way home from a trip to China and his embalmed body was scheduled to be brought back to Singapore. However, the Chinese government requested to give him a State burial and so he was buried in Nanjing, near the mausoleum of his close friend, Dr Sun Yat Sen.

== Family ==
Lim married Ms. Wi Peck Hay (Chinese: 阮碧霞; pinyin: Ruǎn Bìxiá) and had 3 sons and 6 daughters. His sons Lim Chong Kuo (Chinese: 林忠國; pinyin: Lín Zhōngguó) and Lim Chong Pang (Chinese: 林忠邦; pinyin: Lín Zhōngbāng) later also became prominent merchants and community figures. One of his daughter, Lim Chit Geck, married Oei Tjong Tiong, son of Chinese-Indonesian Businessman, Oei Tiong Ham.

== Legacy ==
Nee Soon Road was officially named in 1950 by the Rural Board to facilitate postal services. Nee Soon also owned a large plot of land in the area and several roads in this area are named after his business concerns and family members. For example, Chong Kuo Road is named after his eldest son Lim Chong Kuo, and Chong Pang City his second son Lim Chong Pang.

The residential town of Yishun in the northern part of Singapore, is also named after him. Although originally named Nee Soon, the name was subsequently romanized to its current appellation, to reflect the Singapore government's move to use standardised Mandarin over the unstandardised Chinese variants prominent amongst local dialect groups.

== Secondary sources ==
- Lim, How Seng; Lim, Guan Hock, eds. (1987). A Pictorial history of Nee Soon Community. Singapore: The grassroots organisations of Nee Soon Constituency : National Archives : Oral History Department. p. 43.
- Wakin, Eric (1997). Asian Independence Leaders. Global profiles. New York: Facts on file. pp. 13–16. ISBN 0-8160-3320-X.
- Cornelius-Takahama, Vernon (25 May 2001). "Lim Nee Soon". Singapore Infopedia. Singapore: The National Library of Singapore. Archived from the original on 29 November 2009.
- "Famous Singapore Chinese Supporters of Dr Sun Yat Sen". Dr Sun & 1911 Revolution. Singapore: Sun Yat Sen Nanyang Memorial Hall. Archived from the original on 26 November 2009.
- "Death [Obituary](Lim Nee Soon)". The Straits Times. Singapore. 23 March 1936. p. 2.
