= Khoo Teck Puat Hospital =

Hospital in Singapore

- National Healthcare Group

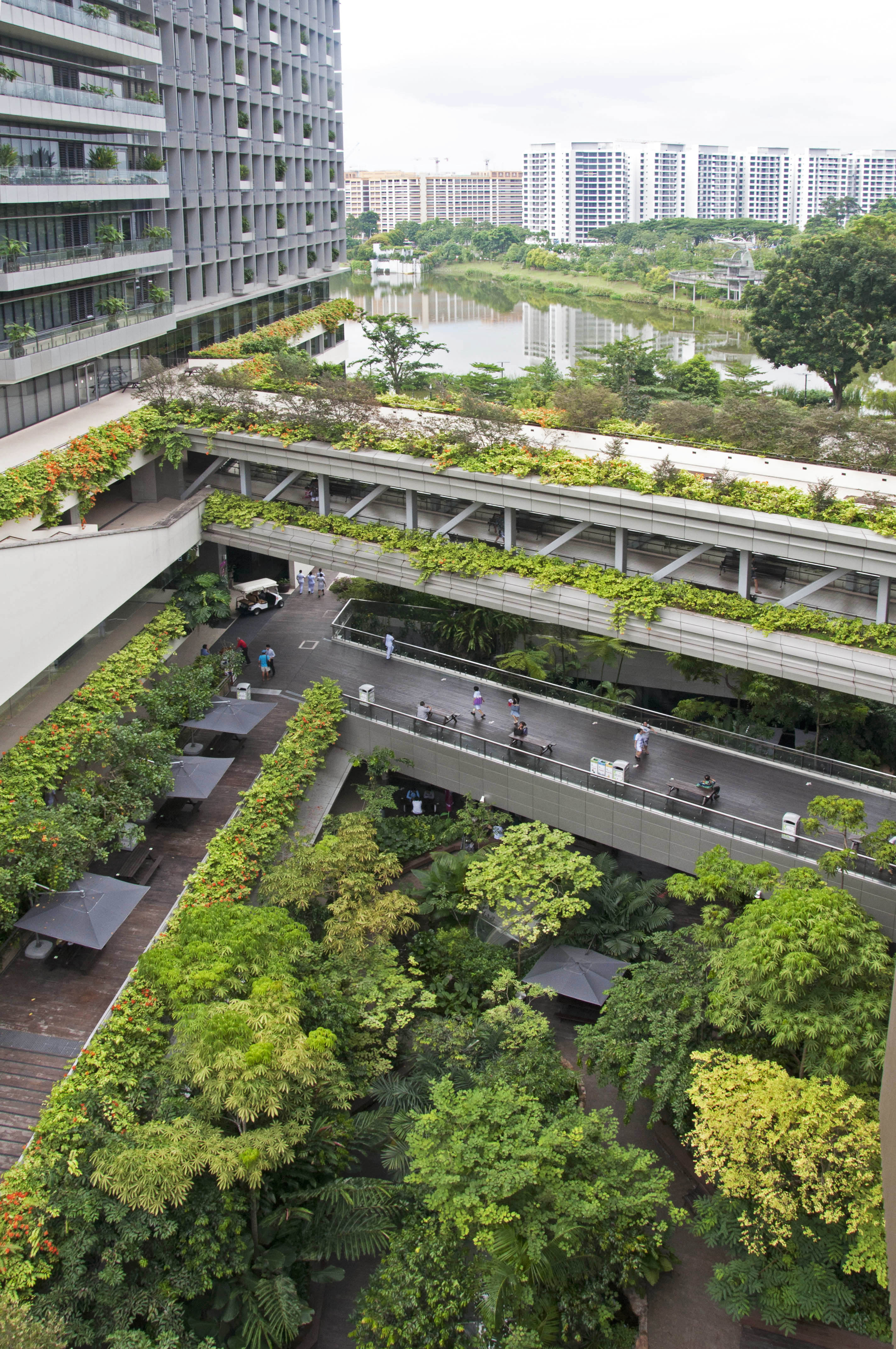
- Link bridge between Tower B and C at KTPH

Geography
- Location: 90 Yishun Central, Singapore 768828, Singapore
- Coordinates: 1.424635°N 103.838208°E

Organisation
- Type: District General

Services
- Emergency department: Yes Accident & Emergency
- Beds: 795

History
- Founded: 28 March 2010; 16 years ago

Links
- Website: ktph.com.sg
- Lists: Hospitals in Singapore

Khoo Teck Puat Hospital (Abbreviation: KTPH) is a 795-bed general and acute care hospital located at Yishun in Singapore. Named after Singaporean hotelier, Khoo Teck Puat, the hospital is part of an integrated development together with the adjoining Yishun Community Hospital. The hospital was officially opened by Minister Mentor Lee Kuan Yew on 15 November 2010, but began seeing outpatients and day surgery patients on 28 March that year.

KTPH spanned over 3.5 hectares (8.6 acres) in the Yishun Central Area. The hospital cost an estimated S$700 million (2023) (US$521.31 million) to build.

In October 2017, KTPH merged with the National Healthcare Group (NHG) and is part of the collective Yishun Health, together with Yishun Community Hospital and Admiralty Medical Centre.

== History ==
In 2001, plans were announced that a new hospital, the Jurong General Hospital, will be built and will replace the current Alexandra Hospital. The hospital was slated to be completed by 2006. However, in 2004, the plan was scrapped. Instead, the next new public hospital will be built in the north at Yishun and be completed by 28 March 2010.

On 28 November 2006, Alexandra Hospital marked the first milestone for its new hospital with a groundbreaking ceremony at the new hospital site. The guest-of-honor was Health Minister Khaw Boon Wan. An exhibition titled "Metamorphosis: From Old to New" was held at the same time, showcasing photographs depicting the transformation of the existing hospital building in Alexandra Road from pre- and post-independence years to the present times. 3-dimensional models and perspectives of the new hospital building were also on display.

On 16 May 2007, Khaw, while attending the HIMSS AsiaPac 2007 conference, announced that the new general hospital in Yishun has been named Khoo Teck Puat Hospital. In acknowledgement of the S$125 million donation made by the late hotelier Khoo Teck Puat's family towards building and funding of the hospital, the hospital was named after him instead of the previously planned name, Alexandra Hospital @ Yishun. On 30 September, Khaw, at a community event in Yishun, noted that additional land parcels set aside around the Khoo Teck Puat Hospital could be used for construction of further, more specialised health-care facilities and that beyond 2020, might eventually create a health-care cluster similar to the diverse facilities now in the vicinity of Singapore General Hospital, providing high-quality healthcare services to the growing population in the north. Possible inclusions in the cluster are a community hospital and medical-tourist hotels.

The hospital's specialist outpatient clinics and day surgery operating theatres opened on 29 March 2010. The initial timeline was delayed by about three months because of the Indonesian sand ban and disruption to granite supplies. This forced contractors to bring in more equipment and workers to make up for the time lost.

The facility's inpatient wards and acute care and emergency department began operation on 28 June 2010.

== Design ==
Khoo Teck Puat Hospital was designed by CPG Consultants in collaboration with RMJM to be patient-friendly. The 10-bedded "C"-class wards is divided into two sections, each with its own toilet and shower facilities. There is only one drop-off point for the hospital and it is 20 metres to the emergency department and also between 20 and 40 metres to the specialist clinics.

Wards are designed so that there are no protruding sinks or cupboards to prevent patients hurting themselves.

The hospital also incorporates environmentally friendly features. The building uses 30% less energy than other hospitals leading to a savings of more than S$1 million a year on utilities costs.

"Fins" along the building's walls are designed to channel the prevailing north-east winds into the building. Wind tunnel tests conducted at the National University of Singapore found that the "fins" would enhance the air flow by 20 to 30%. Sun shades are placed over the windows to reduce direct glare from sunlight and also directed upwards towards the ceiling to light up the wards. This reduces energy use on lighting up the hospital. Solar panels on the roof provide power to fans in the public areas. The air-conditioning system draws supply air from its internal courtyards, where the air is cooler, hence reducing the cooling loads.

== Incidents ==
=== 2015 shooting ===
In 2015, Muhammad Iskandar Sa'at, a suspect arrested for motor theft, was being evaluated at KTPH for chest pain while under custody. When one of the two officers accompanying him left the room to break fast, Iskandar assaulted the remaining police officer, Staff Sergeant Muhammad Sadli bin Razali, and fired Sadli's firearm before Iskandar was subdued by Sadli and two other men, and these three shots caused injuries to the officer's left thumb and right foot. Iskandar was initially charged for an unlawful discharge of a firearm under the Arms Offences Act, which carries the mandatory death penalty, but the charge was reduced to an unlawful possession of a firearm for causing hurt to a public servant, which carries a mandatory life sentence. Iskandar pleaded guilty to the reduced charge, and was sentenced to life imprisonment and 18 strokes of the cane.

=== 2020 wrong diagnosis ===
On 22 November 2020, KTPH reported to NHG and then the Ministry of Health on 24 November that it had given wrong test results for the human epidermal growth factor receptor 2 (HER2) test to 180 breast cancer patients and 90 breast cancer patients may have received unnecessary treatment. NHG then convened an independent review committee, which includes external experts, to review the test process and how to prevent future recurrences. All affected patients were identifided and their samples sent to external laboratories for retesting.

On 11 December 2020, KTPH announced the wrong diagnosis and unnecessary treatment to the public. Preliminary investigations suggest that the inaccurate test results was due to incorrect staining process for the HER2 test. Associate Professor Rebecca Dent, head of the medical oncology division at the National Cancer Centre Singapore, said that while the affected patients were "over-treated", it would not affect their treatments and outcomes. While side effects are temporary, patients who suffered more severe side effects affecting heart function would have been referred to a cardiologist over the treatment period. Dent also said the overtreatment would have been for one year with extended therapy up to two years.

The incident was debated in Parliament and was revealed that more than 200 patients were wrongly diagnosed. As only 15-20 per cent of breast cancer patients are afflicted with the condition and the HER2 test is complicated and required a trained pathologist to confirm the test results, it was only discovered if a disproportionate number of patients were being diagnosed with the condition. KTPH's tumour board noticed that the number of HER-2 positive cases was higher than normal and started a review of the cases. KTPH reviewed all the tests done since 2012 when they first started doing the tests in the hospital. Costs estimated by The Straits Times for patients receiving treatments in the public sector cost around 50,000 to $70,000 for a year of treatment while the private sector might cost an additional 25 to 66 percent. (Note: Herceptin costs $3,000-$4,000 per cycle in the public sector, and about $5,000 in the private sector. (5000-3000=2000, 2000/3000=0.66) (5000-4000=1000, 1000/4000=0.25))

In May 2020, an independent review committee had completed its investigation and found that five staff members were found not to performing their duties and responsibilities adequately, leading to the wrong diagnosis and subsequent wrong treatment. The five, included members of management and staff, were punished with either termination of employment, a fine or stern warning. The HER2 test was carried out inadequately by human error due to poor HER2 staining protocol during the setup of the protocol. Slides were overstained and affected interpretation of the slides, leading to higher HER2 positive rate. Rigorous checks for the establishment of the testing protocol were not done which eventually led to poor HER2 staining protocol. During regular monitoring of test results, the deviation of positive rate against international benchmark led to checks on the accuracy of reading of results but not the protocol. The deviation was then deemed due to differences in patient population.

KTPH compensated all affected patients with a full refund of the unnecessary treatment and also counselling for patients who needed it. During Parliament, Members of Parliament Lim Wee Kiak (Sembawang GRC) and Tan Wu Meng (Jurong GRC) asked about the additional cost incurred by affected patients and their caregivers. Tan, a cancer specialist, suggested that compensation to include time taken from work by patients and caregivers for the unnecessary treatment.
