= Jessica Tan =

Singaporean politician (born 1966)

The Honourable Jessica Tan
- 陈舜娘
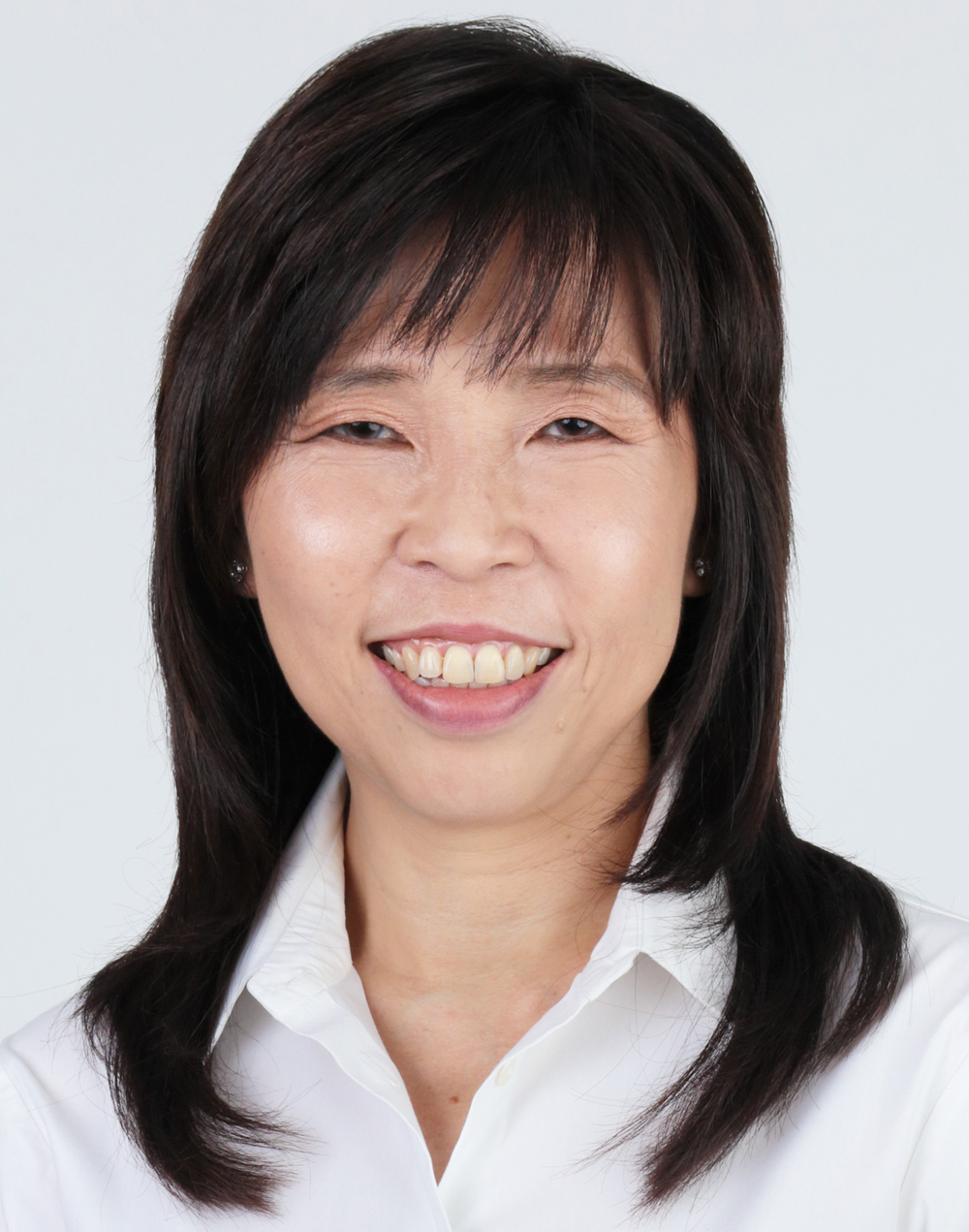
- Official portrait, 2021

Deputy Speaker of the Parliament of Singapore
- In office 31 August 2020 – 22 September 2025 Serving with Christopher de Souza
- Prime Minister: Lee Hsien Loong; Lawrence Wong
- Speaker: Tan Chuan-Jin (until 2023); Seah Kian Peng (since 2023)
- Preceded by: Lim Biow Chuan; Charles Chong
- Succeeded by: Xie Yao Quan; Christopher de Souza

Speaker of the Parliament of Singapore
- Acting
- In office 17 July 2023 – 2 August 2023
- Prime Minister: Lee Hsien Loong
- Preceded by: Tan Chuan-Jin
- Succeeded by: Seah Kian Peng

Member of Parliament for East Coast GRC
- Incumbent
- Assumed office 6 May 2006
- Preceded by: PAP held
- Majority: 23,817 (17.46%)

Personal details
- Born: Jessica Tan Soon Neo; 28 May 1966 (age 60) Singapore
- Party: People's Action Party
- Spouse: Alphonsus Pang (m. 1990)
- Children: 3
- Education: National University of Singapore (BSS)

Jessica Tan Soon Neo (Note: Chinese: 陈舜娘; Pe̍h-ōe-jī: Tân Sùn-niô͘) (born 28 May 1966) is a Singaporean politician who served as Deputy Speaker of the Parliament of Singapore between 2020 and 2025. A member of the governing People's Action Party (PAP), she has been the Member of Parliament (MP) for the Changi–Simei division of East Coast Group Representation Constituency (GRC) since 2006.

== Early life ==
Tan attended Convent of Our Lady of Good Counsel, St. Joseph's Convent and Catholic Junior College before graduating from the National University of Singapore in 1989 with a Bachelor of Social Sciences degree with honours in economics and sociology.

== Career ==
Tan joined IBM Singapore in 1989. In 2002, she was appointed the Director of Networking Services Asia Pacific at IBM Global Services. In July 2008, Tan became the Managing Director of Microsoft Singapore. She joined SATS Ltd as a Non-Executive Independent Board Director in 2017. Since June 2023, she has been an External Director at Mitsui & Co.

=== Political career ===
Tan made her political debut in the 2006 general election when she joined a five-member People's Action Party team contesting in East Coast GRC. After the PAP team won with 63.86% of the vote against the Workers' Party, Tan became a Member of Parliament representing the Changi-Simei ward of East Coast GRC.

Since then, Tan has retained her parliamentary seat in the subsequent general elections in 2011, 2015, 2020 and 2025 after the PAP team in East Coast GRC won with 54.83%, 60.73%, 53.41% and 58.73% of the vote in these four general elections against the Workers' Party.

On 31 August 2020, Tan and Christopher de Souza were elected as Deputy Speakers of Parliament.

On 17 July 2023, Tan became Acting Speaker of Parliament after Tan Chuan-Jin resigned as Speaker following revelations of an extramarital affair. She held the office for two weeks until Seah Kian Peng was elected as Speaker on 2 August.

Tan is the chairperson of East Coast Town Council.

On 22 September 2025, Tan left the role of Deputy Speaker after Xie Yao Quan and de Souza were nominated to it for the 15th Parliament.

== Personal life ==
Tan is a Roman Catholic and a Peranakan.

She has been married to Alphonsus Pang, a public servant, since 1990. They have three children.

== Notes ==
Parliament of Singapore
Preceded by S. Jayakumar; Lee Yock Suan; Raymond Lim; Chew Heng Ching; Tan Soo Khoon; Abdullah Tarmugi	Member of Parliament for East Coast GRC; 2006–present Served alongside: (2006–2011): S. Jayakumar, Raymond Lim, Lee Yi Shyan, Abdullah Tarmugi (2011–2015): Lim Swee Say, Raymond Lim, Lee Yi Shyan, Maliki Osman (2015–2020): Lim Swee Say, Lee Yi Shyan, Maliki Osman (2020–2025): Heng Swee Keat, Cheryl Chan, Tan Kiat How, Maliki Osman (2025–present): Dinesh Vasu Dash, Hazlina Abdul Halim, Tan Kiat How, Edwin Tong	Incumbent
Preceded by Lim Biow Chuan; Charles Chong	Deputy Speaker; 2020–2025; Served alongside: Christopher de Souza	Succeeded by Xie Yao Quan; Christopher de Souza
Preceded by Tan Chuan-Jin	Speaker of Parliament (Acting); 2023	Succeeded by Seah Kian Peng
