= Lim Swee Say =

Singaporean politician

- 林瑞生
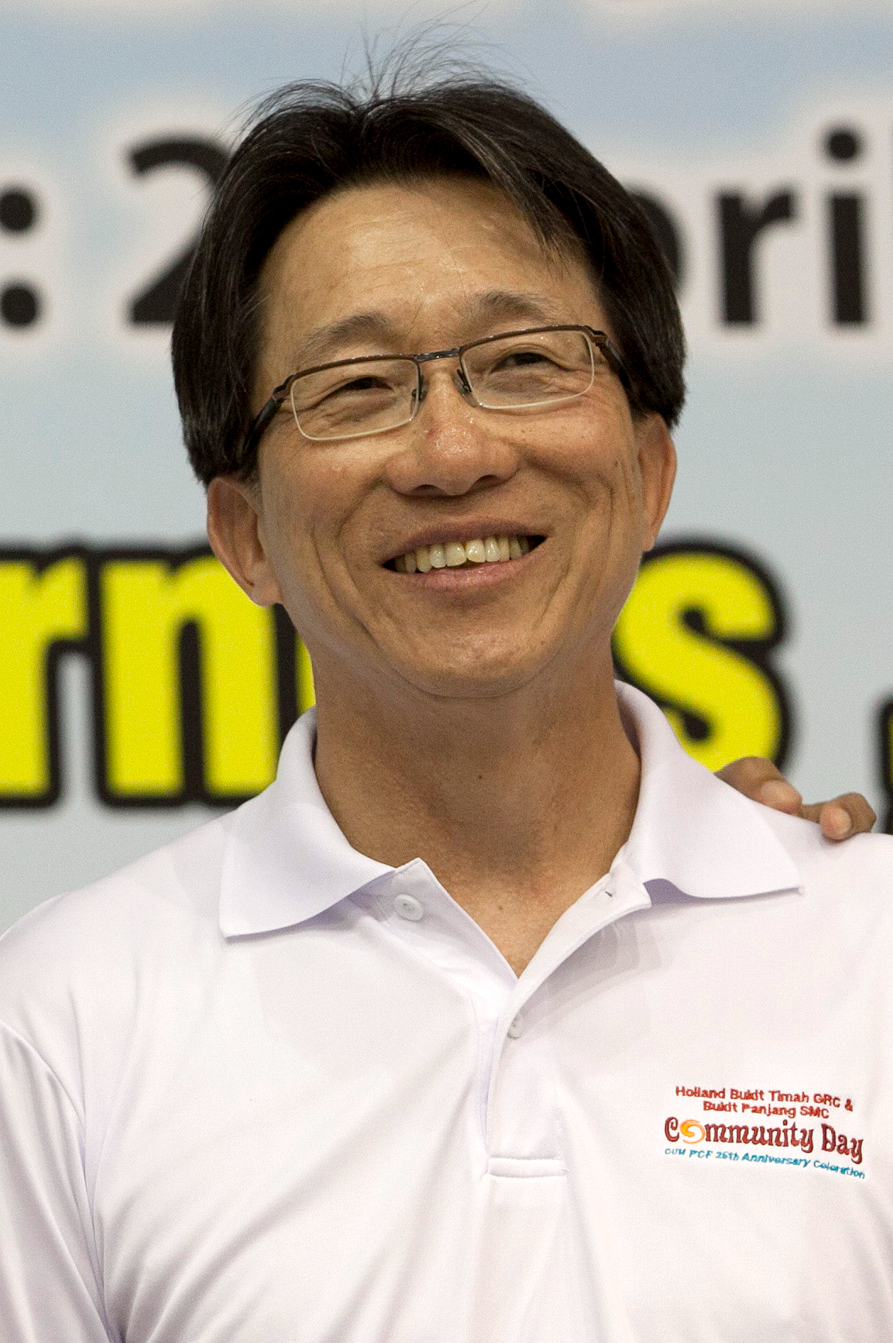
- Lim in 2011

Minister for Manpower
- In office 4 May 2015 – 30 April 2018
- Prime Minister: Lee Hsien Loong
- Second Minister: Josephine Teo (2017–2018)
- Preceded by: Tan Chuan-Jin
- Succeeded by: Josephine Teo

Secretary-General of the National Trades Union Congress
- In office 15 January 2007 – 3 May 2015
- Deputy: Heng Chee How
- Preceded by: Lim Boon Heng
- Succeeded by: Chan Chun Sing

Party Whip of the People's Action Party
- In office 1 April 2007 – 20 May 2011
- Preceded by: Lee Boon Yang
- Succeeded by: Gan Kim Yong

Minister in the Prime Minister's Office
- In office 12 August 2004 – 3 May 2015
- Prime Minister: Lee Hsien Loong
- Preceded by: Lim Hng Kiang
- Succeeded by: Josephine Teo (2017); Desmond Lee (2017)

Second Minister for National Development
- In office 12 August 2004 – 29 May 2006
- Prime Minister: Lee Hsien Loong
- Minister: Mah Bow Tan
- Succeeded by: Desmond Lee (2017)

Minister for the Environment
- In office 23 November 2001 – 11 August 2004; Acting: 1 October 2000 – 22 November 2001
- Prime Minister: Goh Chok Tong
- Preceded by: Lee Yock Suan
- Succeeded by: Yaacob Ibrahim

Member of the Singapore Parliament for East Coast GRC
- In office 7 May 2011 – 23 June 2020
- Preceded by: PAP held
- Succeeded by: PAP held

Member of the Singapore Parliament for Holland–Bukit Timah GRC
- In office 6 May 2006 – 19 April 2011
- Preceded by: Constituency established
- Succeeded by: PAP held

Member of the Singapore Parliament for Holland–Bukit Panjang GRC
- In office 25 October 2001 – 20 April 2006
- Preceded by: Constituency established
- Succeeded by: Constituency abolished

Member of the Singapore Parliament for Tanjong Pagar GRC
- In office 2 January 1997 – 18 October 2001
- Preceded by: PAP held
- Succeeded by: PAP held

Personal details
- Born: 13 July 1954 (age 72) Colony of Singapore, British Empire
- Party: People's Action Party
- Spouse: Elaine Cheong Siew Boon (m. 1981; died 2021)
- Children: 2
- Education: Loughborough University; Stanford University

Lim Swee Say (Note: Chinese: 林瑞生; pinyin: Lín Ruìshēng) (born 13 July 1954) is a Singaporean businessman and former politician who was Secretary-General of the National Trades Union Congress between 2005 and 2015, Minister for Manpower between 2015 and 2018, Minister in the Prime Minister's Office between 2004 and 2015, Second Minister for National Development in 2004 and 2005, and Minister for the Environment between 2000 and 2004.

A member of the governing People's Action Party (PAP), he was the Member of Parliament (MP) for the Buona Vista division between 1997 and 2011 under various group representation constituencies (GRCs), (Note: 1997–2001: under Tanjong Pagar GRC 2001–2006: Holland–Bukit Panjang GRC 2006–2011: Holland–Bukit Timah GRC) and the Bedok division of East Coast GRC between 2011 and 2020.

Lim was appointed as a non-executive independent director in Singtel in 2021.

== Early life and career ==
Lim was born to Teochews and educated at Catholic High School and National Junior College before graduating from Loughborough University in 1976 with a first class honours degree in electronics, computer and systems engineering under a scholarship conferred by the Singapore Armed Forces (SAF) in 1973.

He subsequently went on to complete a master's degree in management at Stanford University in 1991.

Lim was Chief Executive of the National Computer Board between 1986 and 1991, and later as chairman between 1994 and 1998.

He also was Deputy Managing Director at the Economic Development Board (EDB) based in New York City between 1991 and 1993, and managing director between 1994 and 1996.

== Political career ==
Lim made his political debut in the 1997 general election as part of a five-member PAP team contesting in Tanjong Pagar GRC, led by Prime Minister Lee Kuan Yew and was elected in a walkover. He was on the PAP's team in Holland–Bukit Panjang GRC at the 2001 general election, and in Holland–Bukit Timah GRC at the 2006 general election, and was elected unopposed on both occasions. At the 2011 general election, Lim stood in East Coast GRC, where the PAP's team defeated the team from the opposition Workers' Party by 59,992 votes (54.8%) to 49,429 (45.2%).

Lim was Deputy Secretary-General of the National Trades Union Congress (NTUC) from 1997 to 1999. He also was on the Committee on Singapore's Competitiveness from 1997 to 1998, and chaired its Sub-committee on Manpower Development.

In 1999, Lim was appointed as Minister of State for Trade and Industry and Minister of State for Information, Communications and the Arts.

Lim was made a member of the PAP's Central Executive Committee in 1999 and was chairman of the party's youth wing between 2000 and 2004.

Lim was made the Acting Minister for the Environment on 1 October 2000. He became a full minister of the Cabinet on 23 November 2001.

=== Minister in Prime Minister's Office (2004–2015) ===
On 12 August 2004, Lim was appointed a Minister in the Prime Minister's Office. He also was the Second Minister for National Development from 12 August 2004 to 29 May 2006.

In 2005, Lim became the Deputy Secretary-General of the NTUC for the second time (while continuing concurrently as a Minister without portfolio in the Prime Minister's Office). In 2007, he was made the Secretary-General of the NTUC.

In 2014, Lim appeared on Singapore's Mediacorp Channel 8 episode "Hear Me Out", to respond to the criticisms against him and clarify himself on a few topics such as his Zorro costume, "Cheaper Better Faster", "Better, Betterer, Betterest", "Deaf Frog" and why Singapore implements Progressive Wage Model instead of minimum wage.

=== Minister for Manpower (2015–2018) ===
On 4 May 2015, Lim relinquished his post of Minister in Prime Minister's Office and NTUC secretary-general (in line with the NTUC's retirement policies) and was appointed the Minister for Manpower.

Lim retired from the cabinet on 1 May 2018, with his Manpower portfolio succeeded to Josephine Teo. On the same day, he was appointed to NTUC as trustee of NTUC and chairman of NTUC Administration and Research Unit (ARU) Board of Trustees replacing his predecessor Lim Boon Heng. On 5 May, Lim was awarded the Distinguished Comrade of Labour during the May Day Awards ceremony.

=== Retirement from politics ===
In 2020, Lim announced that he would be retiring from politics, and not stand for the 2020 general election. In 2021, he was appointed as an independent director in Singtel.

== Personal life ==
Lim married Elaine Cheong Siew Boon (born 1952) in 1981, introduced by a mutual friend. The couple had one daughter and one son. Cheong died on 6 July 2021, having had stage 4 cancer since 2017.

== Notes ==
Political offices
Preceded by Lee Yock Suan	Minister for the Environment; 23 November 2001 – 11 August 2004; Acting: 1 October 2000 – 22 November 2001	Succeeded by Yaacob Ibrahim as Minister for the Environment and Water Resources
New office	Second Minister for National Development; 12 August 2004 – 29 May 2006	Position abolished
New office	Minister in the Prime Minister's Office; 12 August 2004 – 4 May 2015; Served alongside: (2004 – 2006): Lim Boon Heng, Raymond Lim (2006 – 2012): Lim Boon Heng, Lim Hwee Hua (2006 – 2012): Lim Boon Heng, Lim Hwee Hua (2012 – 2013): S. Iswaran (2013 – 2015): S. Iswaran, Grace Fu (2015): S. Iswaran, Grace Fu, Chan Chun Sing, Masagos Zulkifli	Succeeded by S. Iswaran; Grace Fu; Chan Chun Sing; Masagos Zulkifli
Preceded by Tan Chuan-Jin	Minister for Manpower; 1 October 2015 – 30 April 2018	Succeeded by Josephine Teo
Parliament of Singapore
Preceded by S. Vasoo; Koo Tsai Kee; Lee Kuan Yew; Lim Hng Kiang	Member of Parliament for Tanjong Pagar GRC (Buona Vista); 1997 – 2001; Served alongside: Ow Chin Hock, Chay Wai Chuen, S. Vasoo, Koo Tsai Kee, Lee Kuan Yew	Succeeded by Khaw Boon Wan; Chay Wai Chuen; Chong Weng Chiew; Indranee Rajah; Koo Tsai Kee; Lee Kuan Yew
New constituency	Member of Parliament for Holland–Bukit Panjang GRC; 2001 – 2006; Served alongside: Vivian Balakrishnan, David Lim Tik En, Gan Kim Yong, Teo Ho Pin	Constituency abolished
New constituency	Member of Parliament for Holland–Bukit Timah GRC; 2006 – 2011; Served alongside: Yu-Foo Yee Shoon, Vivian Balakrishnan, Christopher de Souza, Liang Eng Hwa	Succeeded by Sim Ann; Vivian Balakrishnan; Christopher de Souza; Liang Eng Hwa
Preceded by S. Jayakumar; Jessica Tan; Raymond Lim; Lee Yi Shyan; Abdullah Tarmugi	Member of Parliament for East Coast GRC; 2011 – 2020; Served alongside: (2011 – 2015): Jessica Tan, Raymond Lim, Lee Yi Shyan, Maliki Osman (2015– 2020): Jessica Tan, Lee Yi Shyan, Maliki Osman	Succeeded by Heng Swee Keat; Jessica Tan; Cheryl Chan; Tan Kiat How; Maliki Osman
Party political offices
Preceded by George Yeo	Chairman of Young PAP; 2000 – 2004	Succeeded by Vivian Balakrishnan
Trade union offices
Preceded by Lim Boon Heng	Secretary-General of the National Trades Union Congress; 2007 – 2015	Succeeded by Chan Chun Sing
