= Edwin Tong =

Singaporean politician (born 1969)

The Honourable Edwin Tong SC
- 唐振辉
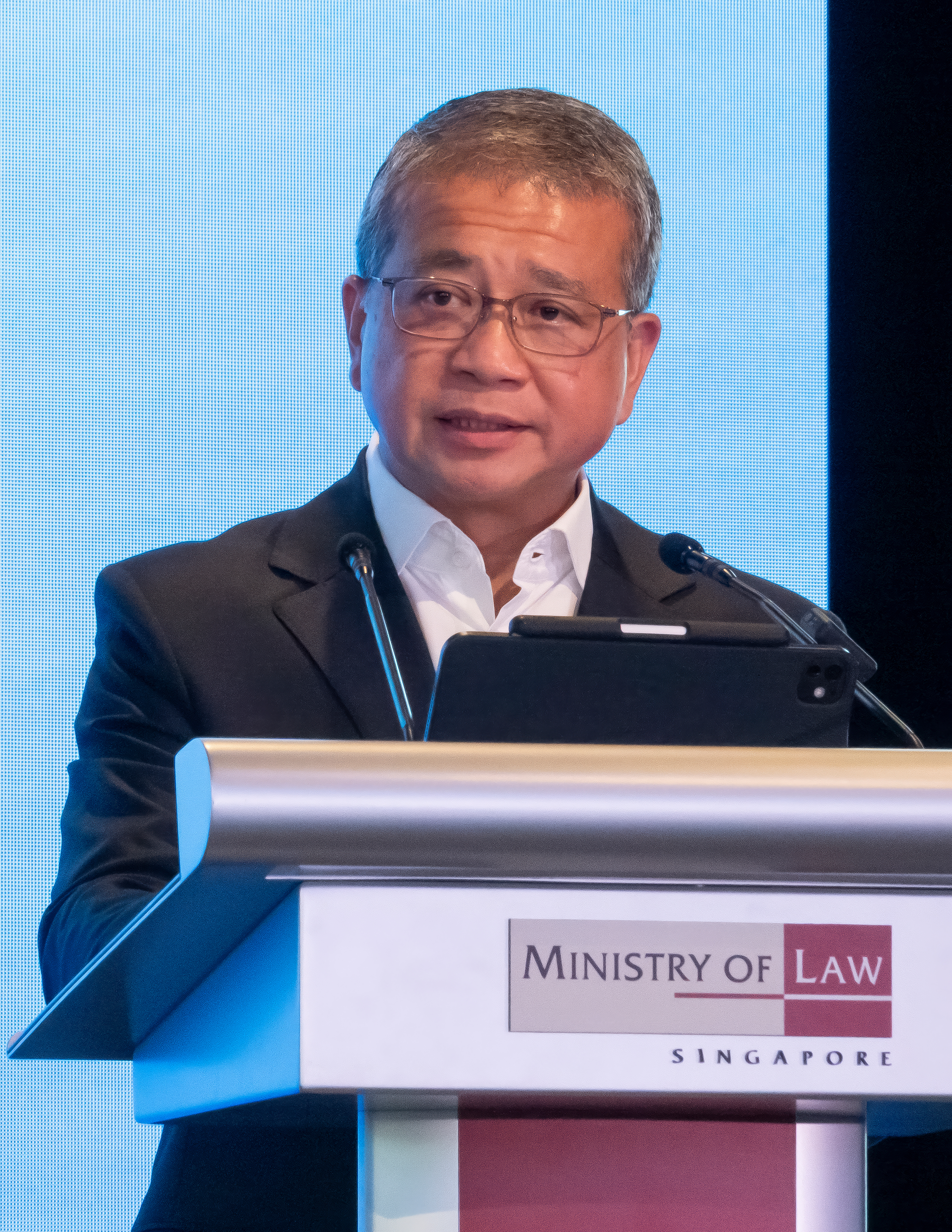
- Tong in 2026

Minister for Law
- Incumbent
- Assumed office 23 May 2025
- Prime Minister: Lawrence Wong
- Preceded by: K. Shanmugam

Second Minister for Home Affairs
- Incumbent
- Assumed office 23 May 2025
- Prime Minister: Lawrence Wong
- Minister: K. Shanmugam
- Preceded by: Josephine Teo

Organising Secretary of the People's Action Party
- Incumbent
- Assumed office 26 November 2022 Serving with Grace Fu
- Prime Minister: Lawrence Wong
- Preceded by: Chan Chun Sing; Ng Eng Hen

Second Minister for Law
- In office 27 July 2020 – 22 May 2025
- Prime Minister: Lee Hsien Loong; Lawrence Wong
- Minister: K. Shanmugam
- Preceded by: Indranee Rajah (2018)
- Succeeded by: Vacant

Minister for Culture, Community and Youth
- In office 27 July 2020 – 22 May 2025
- Prime Minister: Lee Hsien Loong; Lawrence Wong
- Preceded by: Grace Fu
- Succeeded by: David Neo

Member of the Singapore Parliament for East Coast GRC
- Incumbent
- Assumed office 3 May 2025
- Preceded by: PAP held
- Majority: 23,817 (17.46%)

Member of the Singapore Parliament for Marine Parade GRC
- In office 11 September 2015 – 15 April 2025
- Preceded by: PAP held
- Succeeded by: Constituency abolished
- Majority: 20,143 (15.52%)

Member of the Singapore Parliament for Moulmein–Kallang GRC
- In office 7 May 2011 – 24 August 2015
- Preceded by: Constituency created
- Succeeded by: Constituency abolished

Personal details
- Born: Edwin Charles Tong Chun Fai; 12 August 1969 (age 57) Singapore
- Party: People's Action Party
- Education: National University of Singapore (LLB)
- Profession: Lawyer

Edwin Charles Tong Chun Fai (Note: Chinese: 唐振辉; pinyin: Táng Zhènhuī; Jyutping: Tong^{4} Zan^{3} Fai^{1}. In this Chinese name, the family name is Tong. In accordance with custom, the Western-style name is Edwin Charles Tong and the Chinese-style name is Tong Chun Fai.) SC (born 12 August 1969) is a Singaporean politician and lawyer who has been appointed as Minister for Law and Second Minister for Home Affairs concurrently in 2025.

A member of the governing People's Action Party (PAP), he has been the Member of Parliament (MP) representing the Joo Chiat division of East Coast GRC since 2025, and previously the Joo Chiat division of Marine Parade GRC between 2015 and 2025, and the Jalan Besar division of Moulmein–Kallang GRC between 2011 and 2015. He has also been serving as Deputy Chairman of the People's Association since 2021. Prior to entering politics, Tong was a lawyer at Allen & Gledhill practising extensively in corporate and commercial disputes, restructuring and insolvency matters, and international arbitration. He was appointed Senior Counsel in 2015.

Tong made his political debut in the 2011 general election as part of a four-member PAP team contesting in Moulmein–Kallang GRC and won. Throughout his political career, he served as Senior Minister of State for Law and Senior Minister of State for Health before being promoted to full minister after the 2020 general election. He forms part of the new Cabinet selected by Lawrence Wong announced in May 2024.

== Early life and education ==
Born in Singapore, Tong was educated at St. Joseph's Institution and Raffles Junior College before graduating from the National University of Singapore in 1994 with a Bachelor of Laws degree.

During his time in Raffles Junior College, he was classmates with former Parliament Speaker and former Marine Parade GRC Member of Parliament, Tan Chuan-Jin.

== Career ==
=== Legal career ===
After he was admitted to the Singapore Bar, Tong joined Allen & Gledhill and had been a partner at the law firm until 2018. During his legal career, Tong practised extensively in corporate and commercial disputes, restructuring and insolvency matters, and international arbitration. He was appointed Senior Counsel in 2015.

Tong was one of the lawyers representing Kong Hee, the pastor of City Harvest Church accused of misappropriating church funds in a high-profile case. During the trial, which lasted from 2012 to 2018, a front-page headline from the Chinese tabloid Lianhe Wanbao, which had been edited to insinuate that Tong and the People's Action Party (PAP) had saved Kong from harsher penalties, appeared on social media. The original headline read "Outdated law saved [Kong and the other convicted church leaders]"; the edited headline read "PAP lawyer saved [Kong and the other convicted church leaders]". On 5 February 2018, the Attorney-General's Chambers (AGC) mentioned that it would take legal action against a man responsible for publishing the image, which amounts to contempt of court.

=== Political career ===
Prior to entering politics in the 2011 general election, Tong was already active in grassroots activities in various constituencies, particularly Jalan Besar GRC. In 2011, he was fielded by the People's Action Party (PAP) as part of a four-member team to contest in Moulmein–Kallang GRC. The PAP team won 58.56% of the vote against the Workers' Party (WP) and Tong was elected a Member of Parliament representing the Jalan Besar division. He was Deputy Chairman of the Government Parliamentary Committee (GPC) for Law and Home Affairs between 2011 and 2018.

In the 2015 general election, Tong switched from Moulmein–Kallang GRC to the five-member PAP team contesting in Marine Parade GRC led by Tan Chuan-Jin. His team proceeded to win with 64.07% of the vote against the WP team led by former NCMP Yee Jenn Jong. He was then elected as the Member of Parliament representing the Joo Chiat division of Marine Parade GRC. On 1 July 2018, he was appointed Senior Minister of State at the Ministry of Law and Ministry of Health. Former Prime Minister Goh Chok Tong revealed that when Tong became a Senior Minister of State, he essentially had a 75% pay cut—down to about S$500,000 a year compared to his previous earnings of over S$2 million a year as a lawyer. Tong also served on the board of the Land Transport Authority (LTA) from 2017 to 2018.

In March 2018, Tong was selected to be part of the ten-member Select Committee on Deliberate Online Falsehoods tasked with looking into the issue of deliberate online falsehoods and how to deal with them. During the public hearings, a group of activists issued a lengthy missive on 2 April 2018, stating that the hearings did not feel like a genuine attempt to solicit views and that the attendees' views had been misrepresented. One of the activists, Kirsten Han, was questioned by Tong over an article she had written for the Asia Times whose relevance to the committee's terms of reference was not made clear. Tong also quoted the first three paragraphs of a 2011 article from The Guardian, in which former British Prime Minister Tony Blair described the Freedom of Information Act as "dangerous", to question Han over the Freedom of Information Act when the rest of the article presents a different picture.

In the 2020 general election, Tong managed to retain his parliamentary seat in Marine Parade GRC after the five-member PAP team won 57.76% of the vote against the WP. On 27 July 2020, he was promoted to full Minister and appointed Minister for Culture, Community and Youth, and Second Minister for Law.

In the 2025 general election, Tong's Joo Chiat ward was moved to East Coast GRC. He retained his seat as the PAP secured 58.73% of the vote against the WP led by former NCMP Yee Jenn Jong, which garnered 41.27%. Following the announcement of the Second Lawrence Wong Cabinet, Tong was appointed Minister for Law, taking over from K. Shanmugam. His appointment marked a milestone, as he became the first Chinese individual to hold the post. The role had previously been held only by members of minority communities, including both K. M. Byrne (1959–1963) and E. W. Barker (1964–1988) who was of Eurasian descent, as well as both S. Jayakumar (1988–2008) and K. Shanmugam (2008–2025) who were of Indian descent.

=== Taylor Swift deal ===
During a Q&A session with Mothership, it was revealed that Tong, as Minister of Culture, Community and Youth, played a direct role in securing Singapore's dates for Taylor Swift's The Eras Tour. He stated that the country had reached out to Swift even before her international tour dates were made public, with a deal signed by May 2023. The agreement ensured that Singapore would be her only stop in Southeast Asia, with the official announcement made in June 2023. Tong's role in securing Swift's exclusive concerts in Singapore sparked diplomatic tensions with neighbouring countries, mainly because of her considerable cultural and economic influence.

In response, Singaporean politicians and diplomats defended his actions and the government's approach. Prime Minister Lee Hsien Loong described the deal as a "successful arrangement" by his government. Veteran diplomat Bilahari Kausikan stated that as a small city-state, Singapore could not afford to be "inefficient" like some of its neighbours. He questioned whether Singapore should restrain itself simply because "some of our neighbours are slow." Media reports indicated that the Government paid between US$2 million and US$3 million for all six shows, a figure notably lower than the up to US$4 million per show claimed by Thai Prime Minister Srettha Thavisin.

== Personal life ==
Tong is married with three daughters. He has an active interest in football and had served in a volunteer capacity as the Vice President of the Football Association of Singapore (FAS) from 2013 to 2020. He is a Catholic and is of Cantonese descent.

== Notes ==
Political offices
| Preceded by Grace Fu | Minister for Community, Culture and Youth; 27 July 2020 – present | Incumbent |
Parliament of Singapore
| New constituency | Member of Parliament for Moulmein–Kallang GRC; 2011 – 2015; Served alongside: Denise Phua, Yaacob Ibrahim, Lui Tuck Yew | Constituency abolished |
| Preceded by Seah Kian Peng; Fatimah Lateef; Tan Chuan-Jin; Tin Pei Ling; Goh Chok Tong | Member of Parliament for Marine Parade GRC; 2015 – 2025; Served alongside: (2015 - 2020): Seah Kian Peng, Fatimah Lateef, Tan Chuan-Jin, Goh Chok Tong (2020 - 2025): Seah Kian Peng, Fahmi Aliman, Tan Chuan-Jin, Tan See Leng | Constituency abolished |
| Preceded by Heng Swee Keat; Jessica Tan; Cheryl Chan; Tan Kiat How; Maliki Osman | Member of Parliament for East Coast GRC; 2025 – present Served alongside: (2025 – present): Jessica Tan, Dinesh Vasu Dash, Hazlina Abdul Halim, Tan Kiat How | Incumbent |
