= South East Community Development Council =

Government organization in Singapore

Coordinates: 1°19′30″N 103°53′55″E

Type
- Type: Local authority of the South East District

Leadership
- Mayor: Dinesh Vasu Dash
- General Manager: Roy Chew
- Seats: 17

Website
- southeast.cdc.gov.sg

South East District of Singapore

The South East Community Development Council is one of five Community Development Councils (CDCs) set up across the Republic of Singapore to aid in local administration of governmental policies and schemes. They are funded in part by the government although they are free to engage in fund-raising activities.

The South East Community Development Council (CDC) was set up on 24 November 2001.Covering the Eastern Coast of Singapore, the South East District is home to more than 551,000 residents. The district includes some of the island's historical neighbourhoods, such as Geylang Serai, Joo Chiat, Bedok, Marine Parade and Serangoon Central.

== Constituencies ==
As of May 2025, the South East district covers:

=== Single Member Constituency (SMC) ===
- Hougang SMC (Note: Both Aljunied GRC and Hougang SMC were previously belong to the North East Community Development Council prior to the 2025 election.)
- Mountbatten SMC

=== Group Representation Constituency (GRC) ===
- Aljunied GRC
  - Bedok Reservoir-Punggol
  - Eunos
  - Kaki Bukit
  - Paya Lebar
  - Serangoon
- East Coast GRC
  - Bedok
  - Changi-Simei
  - Fengshan
  - Joo Chiat
  - Kampong Chai Chee
- Marine Parade-Braddell Heights GRC
  - Braddell Heights
  - Geylang Serai
  - Kembangan
  - MacPherson
  - Marine Parade

== Results of CDC by election ==
The South East CDC was among the low populated CDCs in terms on electorate and represented less seats in Parliament throughout its lifetime, and along with the North East CDC, South East CDC also had tight opposition contests, which result in their vote shares by CDC polling below national average. In 2025, South East CDC scored a plurality of the contested vote for the first time in history, due to the redistricting of Workers' Party-held Aljunied and Hougang constituencies from the North East CDC for balancing purposes, as well as a walkover in Marine Parade-Braddell Heights.

Year	Constituencies (GRC seats in parenthesis)	Seat composition		Electorate		PAP vote share	
Year	Constituencies (GRC seats in parenthesis)	Total	Contested	Total	Contested	Total votes	Vote share
2001	East Coast (6), Joo Chiat, MacPherson, Marine Parade (6), Potong Pasir	15 / 84	3 / 15	344,535	60,349	39,652	73.33%
2006	East Coast (5), Joo Chiat, MacPherson, Marine Parade (6)	13 / 84	7 / 13	314,701	159,552	92,341	64.64%
2011	East Coast (5), Joo Chiat, Marine Parade (5), Mountbatten	12 / 87	12 / 12	320,575	320,575	159,929	55.72%
2015	East Coast (4), Fengshan, MacPherson, Marine Parade (5), Mountbatten	12 / 89	12 / 12	321,443	321,443	185,230	63.25%
2020	East Coast (5), MacPherson, Marine Parade (5), Mountbatten	12 / 93	12 / 12	309,754	309,754	171,641	58.52%
2025	Aljunied (5), East Coast (5), Hougang, Marine Parade-Braddell Heights (5), Mountbatten	17 / 97	12 / 17	479,386	347,597	156,505	49.50%

== Mayors ==
The incumbent mayor of South East District is MP for East Coast GRC Dinesh Vasu Dash from the People's Action Party since 2025.

#	Name	Start of term	End of term	Political Party
1	Matthias Yao	3 January 2001	24 November 2001	People's Action Party
2	Othman Haron Eusofe	24 November 2001	12 August 2004	People's Action Party
(1)	Matthias Yao	12 August 2004	27 May 2011	People's Action Party
3	Maliki Osman	27 May 2011	26 July 2020	People's Action Party
4	Fahmi Aliman	27 July 2020	23 May 2025	People's Action Party
5	Dinesh Vasu Dash	23 May 2025	Incumbent	People's Action Party
