= Hazlina Abdul Halim =

Singaporean politician and news presenter (born 1985)

The Honourable Hazlina Abdul Halim PBM
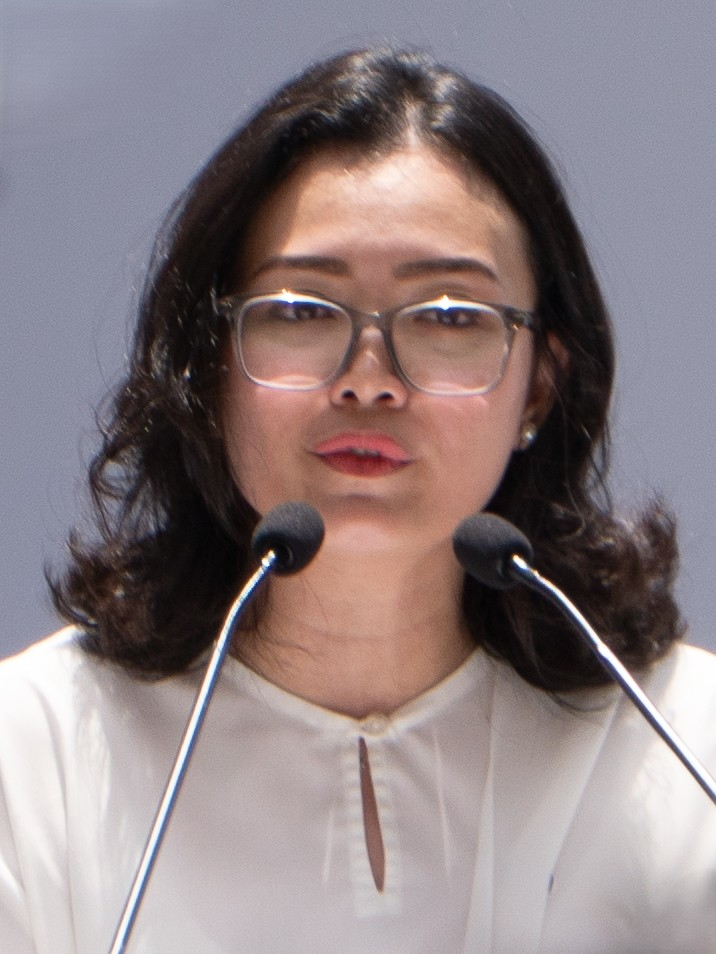
- Hazlina in 2025

Member of the Singapore Parliament for East Coast GRC
- Incumbent
- Assumed office 3 May 2025
- Preceded by: PAP held
- Majority: 23,817 (17.46%)

Personal details
- Born: Hazlina binte Abdul Halim; 17 February 1985 (age 41) Singapore
- Party: People's Action Party
- Education: University of Western Australia; Curtin University of Technology
- Occupation: Presenter; journalist; editor; DJ; news reader

Hazlina binte Abdul Halim (born 17 February 1985) is a Singaporean politician and former broadcast journalist. As a member of the People's Action Party (PAP), Hazlina was elected as a Member of Parliament representing the Fengshan district of East Coast Group Representation Constituency in 2025.

She is currently Senior Vice President at a global advisory firm. Previously, she was CEO of Make-A-Wish Singapore, an international children's charity.

Before that, she was a Public Affairs Advisor. Most notably, Hazlina was news presenter and editor with Singapore's state-owned media company Mediacorp where she presented Malay TV News Berita on Suria and was the Assignments Editor for Channel NewsAsia.

== Early life and education ==
Hazlina was born in Singapore. She is bilingual in English and Malay and speaks basic Mandarin. She holds a diploma in Mass Communication at Ngee Ann Polytechnic and went on to study Political Science and Communication Studies at the University of Western Australia in 2006. In 2010, she was conferred a Master of Film and Television with Distinction from Curtin University of Technology in Perth.

While studying in Perth, Hazlina would come back to Singapore during vacations to work in the newsroom.

== Career ==
Hazlina's media career began with an internship at Ria 89.7FM during her final year at Ngee Ann Polytechnic. She was talent-scouted to be a part-time announcer. Shortly after, Hazlina debuted on MediaCorp Suria in 2005 on TGIF - weekly magazine programme covering current affairs, lifestyle, music, food and community events.

Barely three months into her television debut, Hazlina presented Pesta Perdana 2005 - a live award show honouring Singapore's Malay Television Industry together with Najip Ali, Rima Melati Adams and Khairudin Saharom.

In October 2005, Hazlina began presenting Berita, MediaCorp Suria's prime-time news bulletin. She joined the news team as a journalist in February 2006 before leaving to pursue her bachelor's degree.

From 2011-2014, Hazlina lectured at Temasek Polytechnic's School of Business, with the Diploma of Communications and Media Management and concurrently presenting the Malay news programme, Berita on Suria.

She joined CNA in 2015 as Assignments Editor and led the news coverage planning at Singapore Desk. She continued to present Berita on Fridays.

After a 15-year career in the media, Hazlina moved to Public Affairs.

On 5 December 2020, Hazlina was appointed the President of Persatuan Pemudi Islam Singapura (PPIS), also known as the Singapore Muslim Women's Association. PPIS is a non-profit organisation that supports less-privileged Muslim women, children and families through a series of community programmes.

Hazlina then moved to the social impact space and became CEO of Make-A-Wish Singapore where she was also the region lead for APAC. She left in early 2025 to pursue her political career.

Hazlina is currently the EtonHouse Community Fund CEO.

=== Political career ===
Hazlina was first spotted volunteering with Tin Pei Ling in MacPherson in 2024 and later on at a walkabout in Marine Parade-Braddell Heights GRC in March 2025, implying a possibility of her contesting in the 2025 Singaporean general election. It was later confirmed on 12 April that Hazlina would stand in the East Coast GRC to replace Maliki Osman in his division. PAP eventually won East Coast GRC with 58.76% of the vote. Hazlina has served as the Vice-Chairman of the East Coast Town Council (ECTC) since 2025.

== Personal life ==
Hazlina is married.

== Notes ==
Parliament of Singapore
Preceded by Heng Swee Keat; Jessica Tan; Cheryl Chan; Tan Kiat How; Maliki Osman	Member of Parliament for East Coast GRC; 2025–present Served alongside: (2025–present): Jessica Tan, Dinesh Vasu Dash, Tan Kiat How, Edwin Tong	Incumbent
