= Dinesh Vasu Dash =

Singaporean politician

The Honourable Dinesh Vasu Dash
- ദിനേശ് വാസു ഡാഷ്
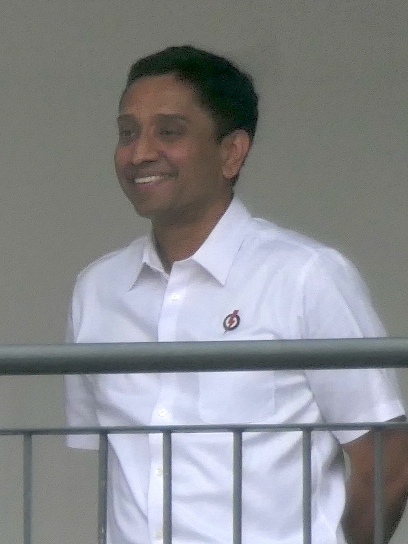
- Dash campaigning in the 2025 general election

Mayor of South East District
- Incumbent
- Assumed office 23 May 2025
- Prime Minister: Lawrence Wong
- Preceded by: Fahmi Aliman

Assistant Organising Secretaries of the People's Action Party
- Incumbent
- Assumed office 5 November 2026 Serving with Alex Yam & Desmond Tan
- Prime Minister: Lawrence Wong

Member of the Singapore Parliament for East Coast GRC
- Incumbent
- Assumed office 3 May 2025
- Preceded by: PAP held
- Majority: 23,817 (17.46%)

Personal details
- Born: 11 November 1974 (age 52) Singapore
- Party: People's Action Party
- Spouse: Rathiga Velaithan
- Children: 3

Military service
- Branch/service: Singapore Army
- Years of service: 1997-2020
- Rank: Brigadier-General

Dinesh Vasu Dash (Note: Malayalam: ദിനേശ് വാസു ഡാഷ്, romanized: Dinēś Vāsu Ḍaṣ) (born 11 November 1974) is a Singaporean politician, former civil servant and brigadier-general. A member of the governing People's Action Party (PAP), he has been serving as Minister of State for Culture, Community and Youth, Minister of State for Manpower and Mayor of South East District since 2025.

== Early life ==
Born in Singapore, his paternal grandfather ran a small business servicing the Singapore Naval Base in the 1960s, while his maternal family lived in British Malaya before settling in Singapore.

Dinesh grew up in a one-room Housing and Development Board (HDB) flat at the police quarters in Pearl's Hill. He lived with his parents, brother and grandmother. They later moved to a three-room flat along Telok Blangah Rise. Dinesh's father, a former police officer, had served as the personal security officer to former President Devan Nair and as an alternate officer to former Prime Minister Lee Kuan Yew.

Dinesh graduated from the Anglo-Chinese Junior College in 1992, and went on to study electrical engineering at the National University of Singapore. He attended the Defence Services Staff College in Wellington, Tamil Nadu for a year between 2006 and 2007.

== Career ==
A member of the People's Action Party (PAP), he has been the Member of Parliament (MP) representing the Bedok division of East Coast GRC since 2025.

Prior to entering politics, he served as the chief executive of the Agency for Integrated Care, Senior Director in the Ministry of Health (Singapore). He oversaw national vaccination operations during the COVID-19 pandemic and the rollout of Healthier SG, a preventive health programme.

He also served as a Brigadier General commanding the 2nd People's Defence Force in the Singapore Armed Forces. During his time in the military, he was deployed to Afghanistan in 2009 for eight months. He was the ground commander during the Trump-Kim summit in Singapore in 2018. He also served as the lead coffin bearer, the only Indian, in the state funeral of former Prime Minister Lee Kuan Yew in 2015. After he retired from the Army in 2020, Dash served as CEO of Agency for Integrated Care and served in that role until he resigned in March 2025 to run in that year's general election.

He served as a member of the Advisory Council on Community Relations in Defence (ACCORD). He was also an EXCO member of SINDA and a Board member of the Hindu Advisory Board.

Dash made his political debut in the 2025 general elections where he was fielded in East Coast GRC helmed by Anchor Minister Edwin Tong facing a Workers' Party team led by ex-NCMP Yee Jenn Jong. His team went on to defeat the WP team with 58.76% of the votes making Dash an MP-elect. He was appointed as Minister of State for Culture, Community and Youth, Minister of State for Manpower and Mayor of South East District on 23 May 2025. Dinesh has served as the Vice-Chairman of the East Coast Town Council (ECTC) since 2025.

== Personal life ==
Dash is married to Rathiga Velaithan, a former cancer researcher in the public sector, and they have three children. He is a fan of heavy metal music and rock music, and plays golf.

Dash is of Malayalee descent, and he also speaks Malayalam and Tamil fluently.

== Notes ==
Political offices
Preceded by Alvin Tan	Minister of State for Culture, Community and Youth; 2025–present Served alongside: Baey Yam Keng	Incumbent
Preceded by Gan Siow Huang	Minister of State for Manpower; 2025–present	Incumbent
Parliament of Singapore
Preceded by Heng Swee Keat; Jessica Tan; Cheryl Chan; Tan Kiat How; Maliki Osman	Member of Parliament for East Coast GRC; 2025–present Served alongside: (2025–present): Jessica Tan, Hazlina Abdul Halim, Tan Kiat How, Edwin Tong	Incumbent
Government offices
Preceded by Fahmi Aliman	Mayor of South East District; 2025–present	Incumbent
