= Tan Kiat How =

Singaporean politician (born 1977)

The Honourable Tan Kiat How
- 陈杰豪
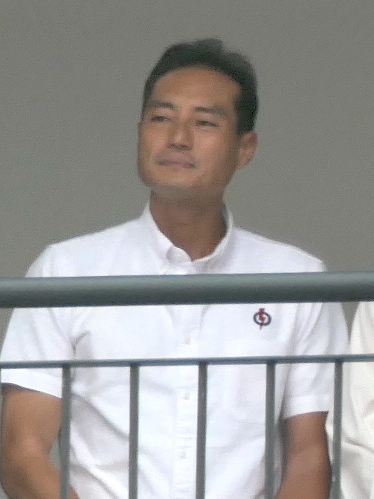
- Tan during nomination in the 2025 general election

Member of Parliament for East Coast GRC
- Incumbent
- Assumed office 10 July 2020
- Preceded by: PAP held
- Majority: 2020: 7,769 (6.78%); 2025: 23,817 (17.46%)

Personal details
- Born: 1977 (age 48–49) Singapore
- Party: People's Action Party
- Children: 3
- Education: University of Illinois (BA, BEng); Stanford University

Tan Kiat How (Note: Chinese: 陈杰豪; Pe̍h-ōe-jī: Tân Kia̍t-hâu) (born 1977) is a Singaporean politician and former civil servant who has been serving as Senior Minister of State for Health since 2025 and Senior Minister of State for Digital Development and Information concurrently since 2022. A member of the governing People's Action Party (PAP), he has been the Member of Parliament (MP) representing the Kampong Chai Chee division of East Coast Group Representation Constituency since 2020.

A computer engineer by profession, Tan had worked at the Ministry of Communications and Information (MCI) and was the chief executive officer of the Infocomm Media Development Authority (IMDA).

He made his political debut in the 2020 general election when he joined a five-member PAP team contesting in East Coast GRC, and they won with 53.39% of the vote. Tan was appointed Minister of State for National Development, after being elected from 2022 to 2025, and appointed to the Prime Minister's Office from 2020 to 2021. In 2022, Tan was promoted Senior Minister of State after a Cabinet reshuffle. In the 2025 general elections, Tan was re-elected with 58.73% of the vote.

== Education ==
Tan was educated at Hwa Chong Junior College before he went to the University of Illinois to study computer engineering and economics. He also completed a master's degree in management at Stanford University and was a Mason Fellow at Harvard University's John F. Kennedy School of Government.

== Career ==
A computer engineer by profession, Tan had worked at the Ministry of Communications and Information, where he served as Deputy Secretary (Cyber and Technology) and helped to develop the Intelligent Nation 2015 blueprint. He was also the chief executive officer of the Infocomm Media Development Authority (IMDA) from January 2017 to June 2020. During his tenure, the IMDA awarded spectrum for the deployment of fifth-generation mobile networks and established the SG Digital Office in May 2020.

=== Political career ===
Tan was announced as a PAP candidate contesting as part of a five-member PAP team in East Coast GRC during the 2020 general election. On 10 July 2020, the PAP team in East Coast GRC won with 53.39% of the vote against the Workers' Party team led by Nicole Seah, so Tan became a Member of Parliament.

On 27 July 2020, Tan was appointed Minister of State at the Prime Minister's Office and Ministry of National Development. On 15 May 2021, he was transferred from the Prime Minister's Office to the Ministry of Communications and Information, while continuing to concurrently serve at the Ministry of National Development. Tan was promoted Senior Minister of State on 13 June 2022 while serving both portfolios of Communications and Information and National Development.

In the 2025 general elections, Tan was once again part of the East Coast GRC team helmed by Community, Culture and Youth Minister Edwin Tong. The team went on to beat the Workers' Party team led by Yee Jenn Jong with almost 59% of the vote. After the elections, Tan was appointed as Senior Minister of State of Health and Digital Development and Information.

== Personal life ==
Tan is married and has three children. His first son Isaac was born on 5 August 2020. On 3 February 2022, Tan revealed he tested positive for COVID-19, along with his wife a day before.

== Controversies ==
On 13 March 2025, Calvin Cheng, in a Facebook post, offered to send the activist group to Gaza, provided they do not return to Singapore and also told their Facebook followers to leave Singapore for Gaza. It was later discovered that Tan along with Foreign Affairs Minister Vivian Balakrishnan had liked the post by Cheng. Tan claimed that he had accidentally like the post after Monday of Palestine Solidarity had questioned him about Cheng's post and had since “unliked” the Facebook post.

== Notes ==
Parliament of Singapore
Preceded by Lim Swee Say; Jessica Tan; Lee Yi Shyan; Maliki Osman	Member of Parliament for East Coast GRC; 2020 – present Served alongside: (2020 - 2025): Heng Swee Keat, Cheryl Chan, Jessica Tan, Maliki Osman (2025 - present): Dinesh Vasu Dash, Hazlina Abdul Halim, Jessica Tan, Edwin Tong	Incumbent
