= Fahmi Aliman =

Singaporean politician

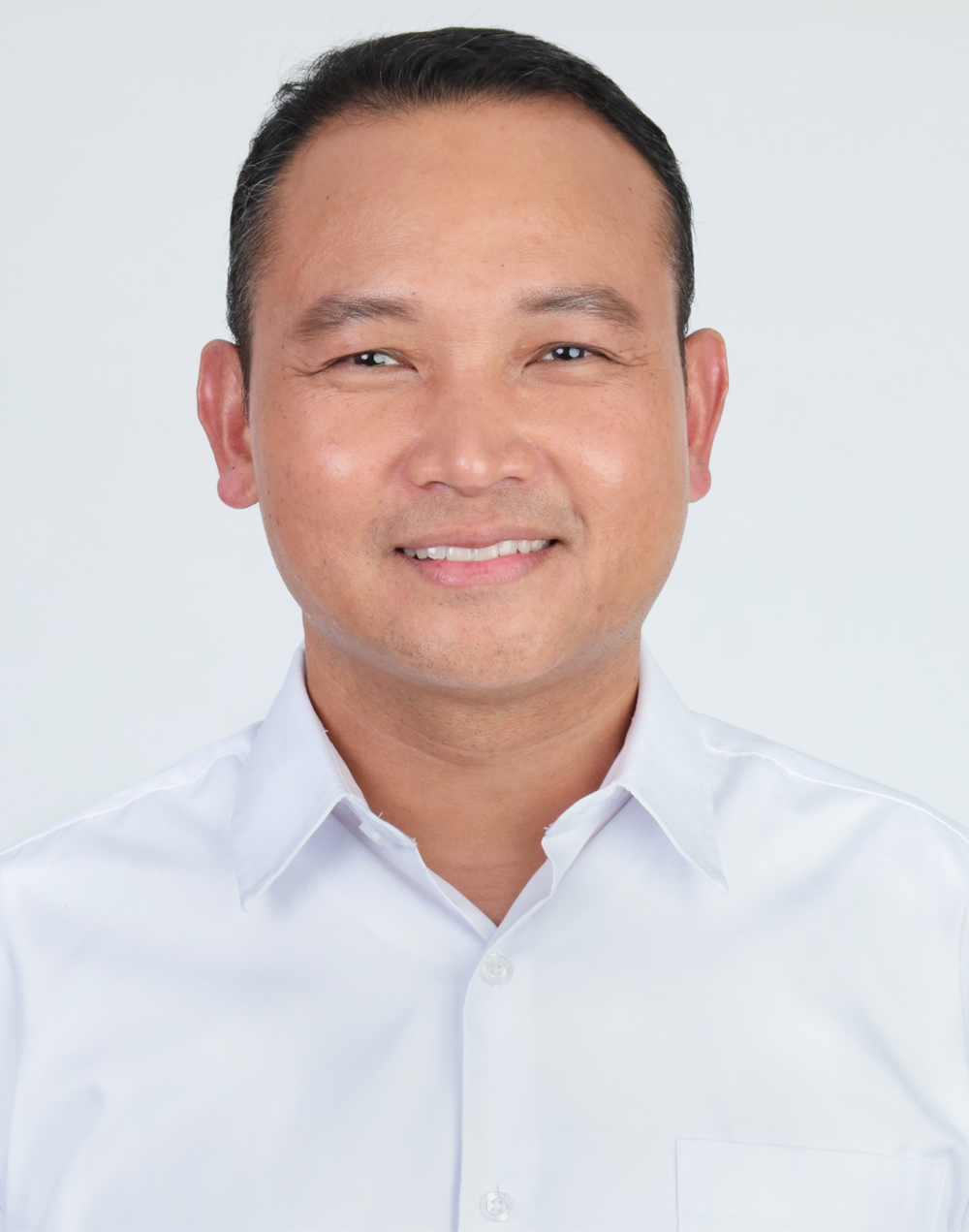
- Official portrait, 2021

Mayor of South East District
- In office 27 July 2020 – 23 May 2025
- Prime Minister: Lee Hsien Loong; Lawrence Wong
- Preceded by: Maliki Osman
- Succeeded by: Dinesh Vasu Dash

Member of Parliament for Marine Parade GRC
- In office 10 July 2020 – 15 April 2025
- Preceded by: PAP held
- Succeeded by: Constituency abolished

Personal details
- Born: Mohd Fahmi bin Aliman; 1972 (age 53–54) Singapore
- Party: People's Action Party
- Spouse: Rohana Mohd Salleh
- Children: 4
- Education: University of Liverpool (BEng); National University of Singapore

Military service
- Branch/service: Singapore Army
- Years of service: 1993–2019
- Rank: Colonel
- Battles/wars: Aceh Monitoring Mission; War in Afghanistan

Mohd Fahmi bin Aliman (born 1972) is a Singaporean businessman, former politician and former army colonel who served as Mayor of South East District from 2020 to 2025. A member of the governing People's Action Party (PAP), he was the Member of Parliament (MP) representing the Geylang Serai division of Marine Parade Group Representation Constituency (GRC) from 2020 to 2025.

== Early life and education ==
Fahmi was born in 1972 in Singapore to a father who was a gas checker and a mother who was a cleaner, and has two siblings.

He attended Jubilee Primary School and Jurong Secondary School before graduating from Ngee Ann Polytechnic with a diploma.

Fahmi subsequently went on to complete a Bachelor of Engineering with honours degree at the University of Liverpool. He also has a graduate diploma from the National University of Singapore in defence technological science.

== Career ==
Fahmi has been the football advisor for Singapore Premier League club Geylang International since 2021.

After leaving the Singapore Army in 2019, Fahmi had a brief stint as the deputy chief executive of Majlis Ugama Islam Singapura (MUIS), before leaving to join the National Trades Union Congress (NTUC) as Director of the Administration and Research Unit in March 2020.

=== Military career ===
Fahmi served in the Singapore Army for 26 years and attained the rank of Colonel. He was deployed for six months to Blangpidie, Sumatra, Indonesia for the Aceh Monitoring Mission in 2005, and six months in Kabul, Afghanistan in 2012 as part of Singapore's contribution to the International Security Assistance Force (ISAF). He was awarded Pingat Penghargaan (Tentera) in 2014 and Long Service Medal (Military) in 2017. In 2011, Fahmi served as the Parade Commander for National Day Parade. In 2018, Fahmi was Singapore Armed Forces' (SAF) Mission Commander to the Humanitarian Aid to Laos.

In 2019, Fahmi left the SAF.

=== Political career ===
Fahmi made his political debut in the 2020 general election as part of a five-member PAP team contesting in Marine Parade GRC led by Speaker of the 13th Parliament Tan Chuan-Jin against the Workers' Party which included former Non-constituency Member of Parliament Yee Jenn Jong. His running mates were Tan, Seah Kian Peng, Tan See Leng, and Edwin Tong. On 11 July 2020, he was elected as the Member of Parliament (MP) after the PAP team garnered 57.76% of the valid votes. He was also appointed Mayor of the South East District replacing Maliki Osman who was promoted as full-time minister.

Fahmi was appointed as Marine Parade Town Council (MPTC) Vice-Chairperson since 2015 to 2025.

Fahmi, as an MP also working for NTUC, is a labour MP as defined by the Singaporean media. In October 2024, ChannelNewsAsia noted that none of the labour MPs filed any questions or spoke during the parliamentary debate concerning the controversial deal to sell a controlling 51% stake in NTUC Enterprise subsidiary Income Insurance to Allianz.

Prior to the 2025 general election, Fahmi retired from politics on 20 April 2025. He also stepped down as Mayor of the South East Community Development Council on 23 May.

== Business career ==
Following his departure from politics in 2025, Fahmi founded MFA Insights Pte Ltd, a Singapore-based consultancy and advisory firm.

== Personal life ==
Fahmi is married and has four children.

== Awards ==
- Commendation Medal (Military) in 2014
- Long Service Medal (Military) in 2017

Parliament of Singapore
Preceded by Fatimah Lateef	Member of Parliament for Marine Parade GRC (Geylang Serai); 2020 – 2025	Succeeded by Constituency abolished
Government offices
Preceded by Maliki Osman	Mayor of South East District; 2020 – 2025	Succeeded by Dinesh Vasu Dash
