= Progressive wage =

Legislation providing for tiered legal wage limit in Singapore

The Progressive Wage Model (PWM), also known as the progressive wage for short, is a wage structure in Singapore, advocated by the National Trades Union Congress (NTUC), the sole national trade union in Singapore. The objective of the Progressive Wage Model has been to increase the salaries of workers through the enhancement of skills and improving productivity.

Progressive wage is enforced via business licensing, as opposed to legislation. This model was designed to enable rank-and-file workers to climb the wage ladder and provides for a minimum wage, improving overall productivity and in turn creating increased sustainable economic growth.

As of 2021, the Progressive Wage Model has been estimated cover around 85,000 workers in the country, with the aim of reaching up to 218,000 workers.

== History ==
While the concept was only introduced by the labour movement in June 2012, this remuneration model is actually an amalgamation of various existing programmes and initiatives over the years by the labour movement to help workers in Singapore upgrade and up-skill themselves to be able to earn higher wages. These programmes and initiatives include the Skills Redevelopment Programme, the Job Redevelopment Programme, the Best Sourcing Initiatives, and the inclusive growth Programme, among others. All of these already help workers in Singapore improve themselves to be able to take on better-paying jobs. However, the Progressive Wage Model takes things a step further by ensuring employers' commitment to their employees' career growth, better wages and increased productivity.

The Progressive Wage Model requirements was made compulsory for three sectors, the cleaning sector in 2015 as well as landscaping and security sectors in 2016. The Progressive Wage Model was made mandatory for the lift and escalator maintenance sector in 2019 and for the retail sector in 2022. It was also made compulsory for the food services sector and waste management sector in 2023 together with the implementation of Occupational Progressive Wages (OPWs) for administrators and drivers.

== Principles ==
The Progressive Wage Model is based on the key objectives of helping Singaporean workers climb the four ladders of skills upgrading, productivity improvement, career advancement and wage progression. Thus far, seven unionised clusters in Singapore have implemented or are planning to implement a Progressive Wage Model to help workers. The Tripartite Cluster for Cleaners, a working committee formed representatives of the tripartite partners, is pushing for the Progressive Wage Model to help about 10,000 cleaners across various industries. These workers are set to earn a higher entry-level basic wage of between S$1,000 and S$1,200. About half of all cleaners employed under government contracts, or over 3,500 cleaners, currently earn basic wages of at least $1,000 per month. The median wage of cleaners in the civil service was between S$675 and S$950 prior to the introduction of the Progressive Wage Model.

Minister of State Josephine Teo was reported saying that the government plans to engage only cleaning companies accredited under the National Environment Agency's Enhanced Clean Mark Accreditation Scheme for all contracts called from 1 April 2013.

According to NTUC secretary-general Lim Swee Say, the reason why Singapore can adopt this method of wage improvements through re-skilling and upgrading of workers is based on these factors: the availability of workfare supplements to help the worker while undergoing training to reach the next step of the wage ladder; the establishment of a comprehensive employee training framework in the country; and the government's financial capacity to pay for such training programmes.

== Overview ==
The Progressive Wage Model is an enhancement to a basic minimum wage model to help increase the salaries of workers in Singapore. NTUC secretary-general Lim Swee Say was reported saying that he believed that the shortcomings of a minimum wage system outweigh the benefits. He noted that if the minimum wage was set too low, it would not help workers. On the other hand, if the minimum wage was set too high, that could result in higher unemployment as employers may not be able to afford to pay their workers. He felt the Progressive Wage Model would be a more sustainable approach to helping workers earn better wages.

Labour MP Patrick Tay delivered a speech at the 2013 Budget Debate in Parliament highlighting how the Progressive Wage Model does not only apply to low wage workers but also to Professional, Managers, and Executives (PMEs). He gave the example of how Singapore Power, a unionised company of The Union of Power and Gas Employees, has implemented a structured path for technicians to progress to senior technician, and thereafter to technical officer, senior technical officer and to an engineer which earns as much as S$7,000 per month.

Singapore's union clusters representing various sectors are working alongside their respective tripartite partners, which include industry players and government officials, to design Progressive Wage Models tailored to meet the needs of each sub-sector. These clusters have set individual targets for progressive wage increases to help especially low-income earners, women and mature workers, the most vulnerable groups of the workforce.

NTUC estimates that the Progressive Wage Model can help about 100,000 workers in the next two to three years from end-2012.

=== Response ===
In 2018, during the Institute of Policy Studies's 30th anniversary conference, Ambassador-at-Large Tommy Koh pointed out that the PWM had improved wages in certain sectors but these workers still do not earn a living wage. In another roundtable discussion with Koh, former minister Lim Boon Heng pointed out that the scheme, coupled with the PWM is Singapore's way of adopting a sectorial approach that creates a de facto sectorial minimum wage. Koh's position, however, is that the PWM needs to scale beyond the selected sectors.
