= George Oehlers =

Singaporean politician

Sir George Oehlers OBE
- Official portrait, 1955

Speaker of the Legislative Assembly of Singapore
- In office 22 April 1955 – 3 September 1963
- Deputy: R. C. H. Lim; G. Kandasamy; John Mammen
- Preceded by: Office established
- Succeeded by: E. W. Barker

Speaker of the Legislative Assembly of Sabah
- In office 23 September 1963 – 22 September 1964
- Preceded by: Office established
- Succeeded by: Mohd Kassim Haji Hashim

Personal details
- Born: 1 April 1908 Singapore, Straits Settlements
- Died: 27 October 1968 (aged 60) Kuala Lumpur, Malaysia
- Resting place: Bidadari Cemetery, Singapore
- Spouse(s): Daphne Eleanor Pye (m. 1940; died 1960) Nan Tessensohn née Flynn (m. 1965–1968)
- Children: 5
- Parents: George Rae Oehlers (father); Frances Maude Oehlers (mother)
- Education: St Andrew's School; Raffles Institution
- Occupation: Politician; lawyer

Sir George Edward Noel Oehlers OBE (1 April 1908 – 27 October 1968) was a Singaporean politician and lawyer who served as Speaker of the Legislative Assembly of Singapore between 1955 and 1963.

== Early life and education ==
George Edward Noel Oehlers was born to George Rae Oehlers and his wife Frances Maude Oehlers (née Clarke), Eurasian Singaporean parents of German and Irish descent. He was educated at St Andrew's School and Raffles Institution.

== Career ==
In 1928, Oehlers was called to the bar at Gray's Inn and practised as a barrister in London for three years.

Upon returning to Singapore, Oehlers became City Councillor in 1933, serving until 1941; he returned to the City Council in 1947, but left ahead of his appointment as Speaker of the Legislative Assembly of Singapore on 1 April 1955 . He left that post in September 1963 to chair the Public Utilities Board.

From 1963 to 1964, he was also Speaker for the Sabah Legislative Assembly and helped to set up the Sabah Legislative Assembly. From 1965, he was Chairman of Singapore's Industrial Arbitration Tribunal, and from June 1965 to his death, he was President of the Industrial Court of Malaysia.

== Personal life ==
Oehlers married Daphne Eleanor Pye on 20 April 1940. They had five children together: Jillian, Lynnette, Harry, John, and Catharine. Daphne Eleanor Pye died on 15 April 1960, and Oehlers remarried in July 1965 to Annie (Nan) Tessensohn née Flynn, a widow.

== Death ==
Oehlers died in Kuala Lumpur on 27 October 1968 and was buried in Bidadari Cemetery, Singapore.

== Honours ==
Oehlers was made an Officer of the Order of the British Empire (OBE) in 1953, and Knight Bachelor in 1958 for his public service in Singapore.

Parliament of Singapore
Preceded by New post	Speaker of the Legislative Assembly of Singapore; 1955 - 1963	Succeeded by E. W. Barker
Parliament of Malaysia
Preceded by New post	Speaker for the Sabah Legislative Assembly; 1963 - 1964	Succeeded by Datuk Haji Mohd Kassim Haji Hashim
