= Speaker of the Parliament of Singapore =

Presiding officer of the Parliament of Singapore

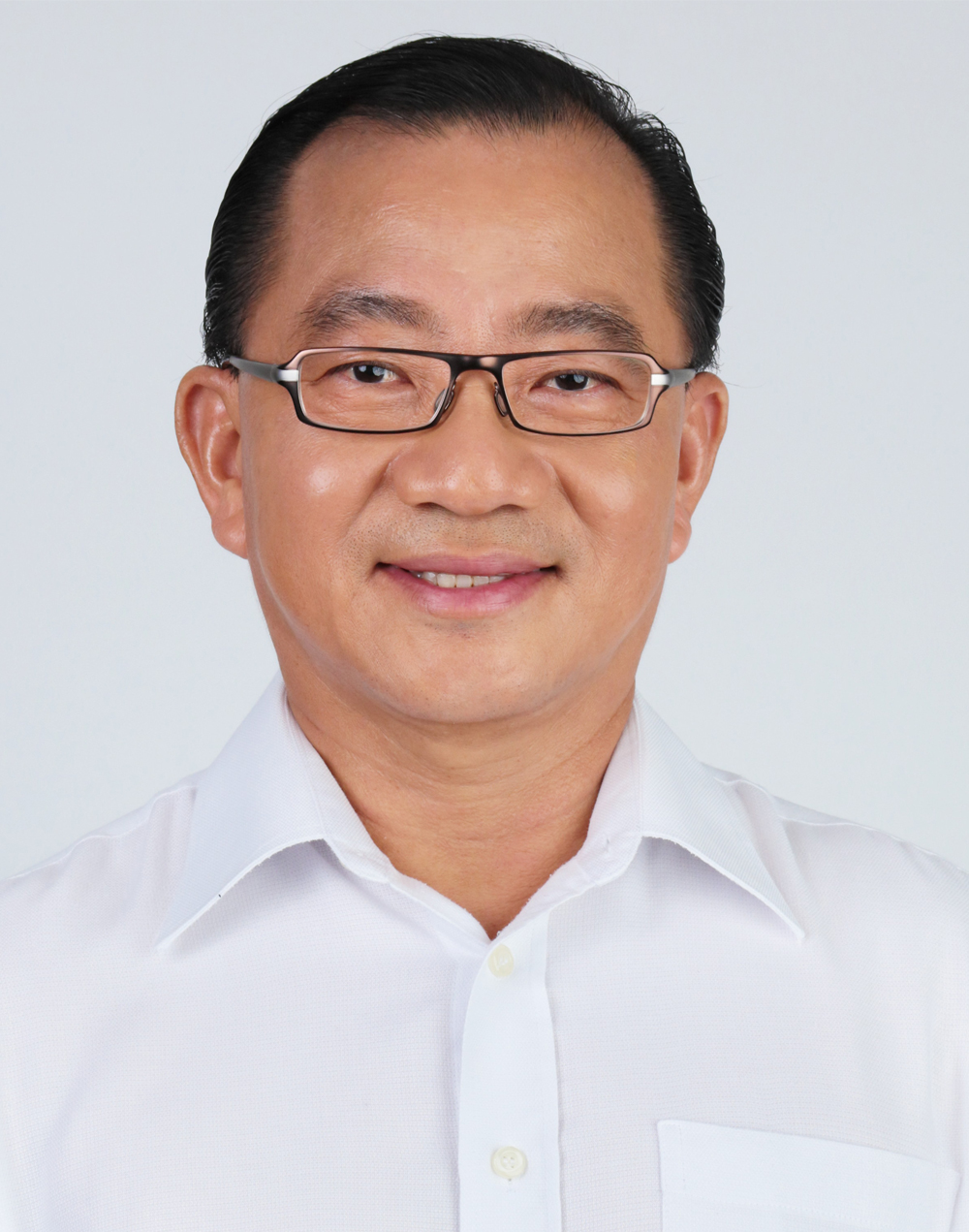
- Incumbent; Seah Kian Peng since 2 August 2023
- Parliament of Singapore
- Style: Mr Speaker (informal); The Honourable (formal)
- Type: Presiding officer
- Nominator: Prime Minister
- Appointer: Parliament
- Term length: No term limit
- Inaugural holder: George Oehlers
- Formation: 5 June 1965; 61 years ago
- Salary: S$900,000 annually (in addition to S$259,500 in MP allowance)
- Website: www.parliament.gov.sg

The speaker of the Parliament of Singapore (Note: Malay: Speaker Parlimen Singapura, Chinese: 新加坡国会议长; pinyin: Xīnjiāpō Guóhuì Yìzhǎng, Tamil: சிங்கப்பூர் நாடாளுமன்றத்தின் சபாநாயகர், romanized: Ciṅkappūr Nāṭāḷumaṉṟattiṉ Capānāyakar) is the presiding officer of the Parliament of Singapore. They are nominated by the prime minister before being appointed by Parliament, and are second in the presidential line of succession. The speaker is assisted by two deputy speakers, who preside over parliamentary sessions in the event that they are unavailable.

The current speaker is Seah Kian Peng, a Member of Parliament (MP) for Marine Parade–Braddell Heights Group Representation Constituency (GRC), who took office on 2 August 2023. The current deputy speakers are Christopher de Souza, an MP for Holland–Bukit Timah GRC, who took office on 31 August 2020, and Xie Yao Quan, the MP for Jurong Central Single Member Constituency (SMC), who took office on 22 September 2025. All individuals are members of the governing People's Action Party (PAP).

== Election ==
Parliament must elect a speaker at the beginning of each new parliamentary term after a general election. The Constitution states that Parliament has the freedom to decide how to elect its speaker. By tradition, the prime minister nominates a person for the role. The person's name is then proposed and seconded by MPs, before they can be elected as speaker.

The speaker is not required to be an elected MP, but must possess the qualifications to stand for Parliament as listed in the Constitution. They cannot be an incumbent cabinet minister or parliamentary secretary.

Once elected, a speaker continues in office until the dissolution of Parliament, unless they resign, are appointed as a cabinet minister, minister of state or parliamentary secretary, or are disqualified from being an MP.

== Role ==
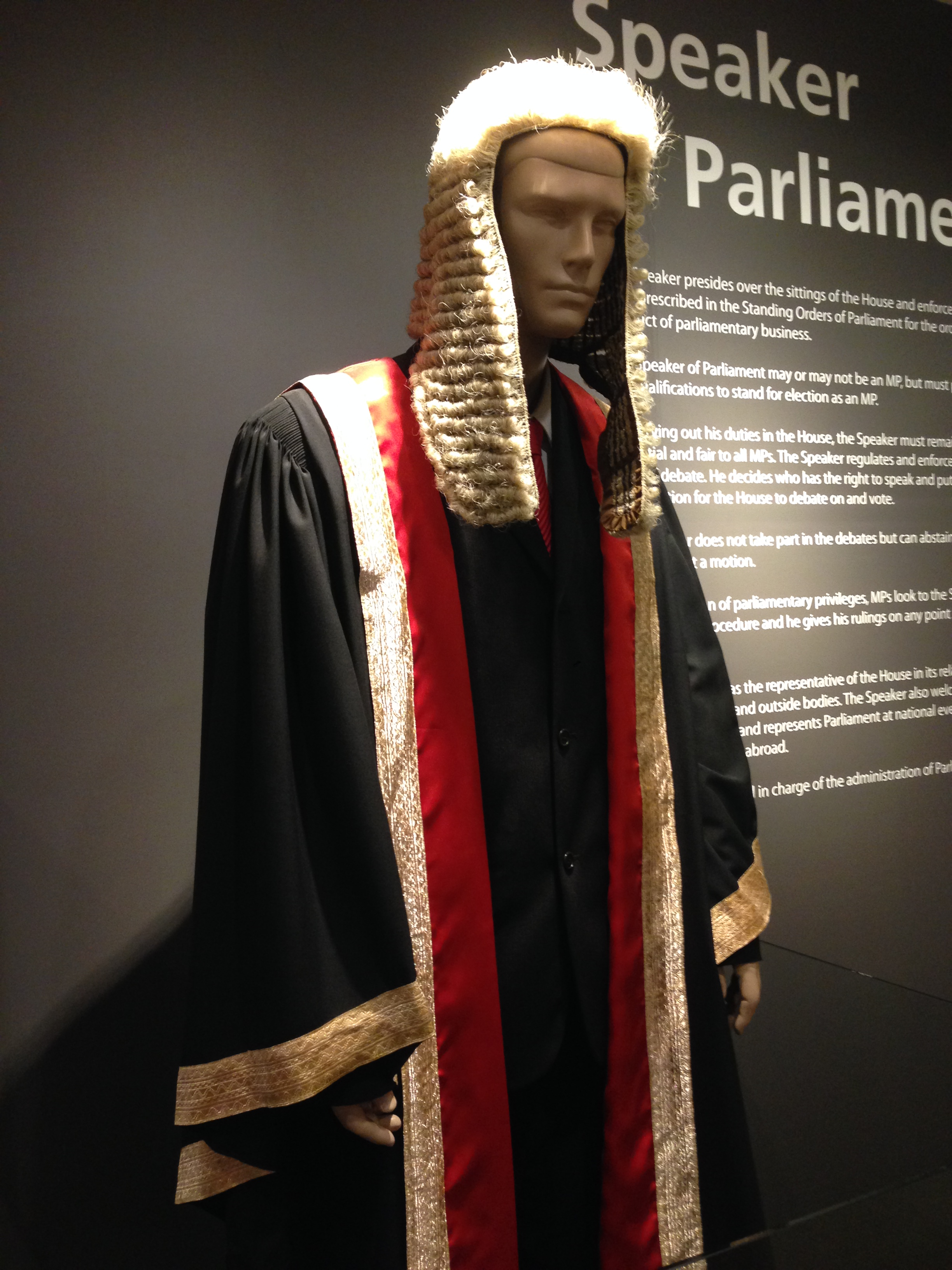
The wig and ceremonial gown of the speaker of Parliament on display in Parliament House. The speaker will only wear the gown during the Opening of Parliament ceremony; the wearing of the wig was discontinued in 1993.

The role of the speaker in Singapore is similar to that in most Commonwealth legislatures. They preside over the sittings of Parliament, and enforce the rules prescribed in standing orders for the orderly conduct of parliamentary business. In carrying out their duties, the speaker must remain impartial and fair to all MPs.

The speaker regulates and enforces the rules of debate. They decide who has the right to speak, and put the question for Parliament to debate on and vote. The speaker does not take part in debates, but, being an elected MP, can abstain from or vote on a motion if they have a vote.

As the speaker is considered the guardian of parliamentary privileges, MPs look to them for guidance on procedures, and for rulings on any points of order.

The speaker is second in the line of succession for the office of President of Singapore. In situations where the president's office is vacant, and the chairperson of the Council of Presidential Advisers is unable to take up the role, the speaker will assume presidential duties until a new president is elected. In terms of state protocol, they sit at the same level as the chief justice of Singapore. The speaker is paid a salary a half of the amount of an entry-level cabinet minister (MR4), and deputy speakers with 15% of an actual speaker. The current amounts were $555,000 and $82,500 respectively, but it will be raised on 15 October 2026 to $900,000 and $135,000 respectively.

The speaker acts as Parliament's representative in its relations with other legislatures and outside bodies. They also welcome visiting dignitaries, and represent Parliament at national events and during official visits abroad. Overall, they are in charge of the administration of Parliament and its Secretariat.

The speakership is one of the few public sector roles in Singapore which allow officeholders to automatically qualify as candidates in presidential elections.

== List of speakers ==
| No. | Portrait | Name Constituency (Birth–Death) | Took office | Left office | Party | Parliament |
|---|---|---|---|---|---|---|
| 1 | | Sir George Oehlers (1908–1968) | 22 April 1955 | 3 September 1963 | Independent | 1st Legislative Assembly |
| 1 | | Sir George Oehlers (1908–1968) | 22 April 1955 | 3 September 1963 | Independent | 2nd Legislative Assembly |
| 2 | | E. W. Barker; MP for Tanglin (1920–2001) | 22 October 1963 | 30 October 1964 | PAP | 3rd Legislative Assembly |
| 3 | | A. P. Rajah (1911–1999) | 2 November 1964 | 5 August 1966 | Independent | 3rd Legislative Assembly |
| 3 | | A. P. Rajah (1911–1999) | 2 November 1964 | 5 August 1966 | Independent | 1st |
| 4 | | Punch Coomaraswamy (1925–1999) | 17 August 1966 | 18 January 1970 | Independent | 1st |
| 4 | | Punch Coomaraswamy (1925–1999) | 17 August 1966 | 18 January 1970 | Independent | 2nd |
| 5 | | Yeoh Ghim Seng; MP for Joo Chiat (1918–1993) | 27 January 1970 | 17 August 1988 | PAP | 2nd |
| 5 | | Yeoh Ghim Seng; MP for Joo Chiat (1918–1993) | 27 January 1970 | 17 August 1988 | PAP | 3rd |
| 5 | | Yeoh Ghim Seng; MP for Joo Chiat (1918–1993) | 27 January 1970 | 17 August 1988 | PAP | 4th |
| 5 | | Yeoh Ghim Seng; MP for Joo Chiat (1918–1993) | 27 January 1970 | 17 August 1988 | PAP | 5th |
| 5 | | Yeoh Ghim Seng; MP for Joo Chiat (1918–1993) | 27 January 1970 | 17 August 1988 | PAP | 6th |
| 6 | | Tan Soo Khoon; MP for East Coast GRC (born 1949) | 9 January 1989 | 17 October 2001 | PAP | 7th |
| 6 | | Tan Soo Khoon; MP for East Coast GRC (born 1949) | 9 January 1989 | 17 October 2001 | PAP | 8th |
| 6 | | Tan Soo Khoon; MP for East Coast GRC (born 1949) | 9 January 1989 | 17 October 2001 | PAP | 9th |
| 7 | | Abdullah Tarmugi; MP for East Coast GRC (born 1944) | 22 March 2002 | 18 April 2011 | PAP | 10th |
| 7 | | Abdullah Tarmugi; MP for East Coast GRC (born 1944) | 22 March 2002 | 18 April 2011 | PAP | 11th |
| 8 | | Michael Palmer; MP for Punggol East SMC (born 1968) | 10 October 2011 | 12 December 2012 | PAP | 12th |
| — | | Charles Chong; MP for Joo Chiat SMC (born 1953); Acting | 12 December 2012 | 14 January 2013 | PAP | 12th |
| 9 | | Halimah Yacob; MP for Marsiling–Yew Tee GRC (born 1954) | 14 January 2013 | 7 August 2017 | PAP | 12th |
| 9 | | Halimah Yacob; MP for Marsiling–Yew Tee GRC (born 1954) | 14 January 2013 | 7 August 2017 | PAP | 13th |
| — | | Charles Chong; MP for Punggol East SMC (born 1953); Acting | 7 August 2017 | 11 September 2017 | PAP | 13th |
| 10 | | Tan Chuan-Jin; MP for Marine Parade GRC (born 1969) | 11 September 2017 | 17 July 2023 | PAP | 13th |
| 10 | | Tan Chuan-Jin; MP for Marine Parade GRC (born 1969) | 11 September 2017 | 17 July 2023 | PAP | 14th |
| — | | Jessica Tan; MP for East Coast GRC (born 1966); Acting | 17 July 2023 | 2 August 2023 | PAP | 14th |
| 11 | | Seah Kian Peng; MP for Marine Parade GRC (until 2025) and Marine Parade–Braddell Heights GRC (from 2025) (born 1961) | 2 August 2023 | Incumbent | PAP | 14th |
| 11 | | Seah Kian Peng; MP for Marine Parade GRC (until 2025) and Marine Parade–Braddell Heights GRC (from 2025) (born 1961) | 2 August 2023 | Incumbent | PAP | 15th |

== List of deputy speakers ==
| No. | Portrait | Name Constituency (Birth–Death) | Took office | Left office | Party | Speaker | Parliament |
|---|---|---|---|---|---|---|---|
| 1 | | Richard Lim; Nominated MP (1904–1968) | 26 April 1955 | 31 March 1959 | LF (until 1959) | Sir George Oehlers | 1st Legislative Assembly |
| 1 | | Richard Lim; Nominated MP (1904–1968) | 26 April 1955 | 31 March 1959 | MCA (from 1959) | Sir George Oehlers | 1st Legislative Assembly |
| 2 | | G. Kandasamy; MP for Kampong Kapor (1921–1999) | 15 July 1959 | 24 September 1961 | PAP | Sir George Oehlers | 2nd Legislative Assembly |
| 3 | | John Mammen; MP for Telok Blangah | 16 November 1961 | 3 September 1963 | PAP | Sir George Oehlers | 2nd Legislative Assembly |
| 4 | | Fong Kim Heng; MP for Joo Chiat (1923–1975) | 9 December 1963 | 9 December 1965 | PAP | E. W. Barker (until 1964) A. P. Rajah (from 1964) | 3rd Legislative Assembly |
| 5 | | Punch Coomaraswamy (1925–1999) | 23 February 1966 | 16 August 1966 | Independent | A. P. Rajah (until 1966) Punch Coomaraswamy (from 1966) | 1st |
| 6 | | Yeoh Ghim Seng; MP for Joo Chiat (1918–1993) | 11 July 1968 | 26 January 1970 | PAP | Punch Coomaraswamy (until 1970) Yeoh Ghim Seng (from 1970) | 2nd |
| 7 | | Tang See Chim; MP for Chua Chu Kang (1932–2026) | 22 November 1972 | 5 December 1976 | PAP | Yeoh Ghim Seng | 3rd |
| 7 | | Tang See Chim; MP for Chua Chu Kang (1932–2026) | 22 February 1977 | 4 December 1980 | PAP | Yeoh Ghim Seng | 4th |
| 8 | | Hwang Soo Jin; MP for Jalan Kayu (born 1937) | 6 March 1981 | 3 December 1984 | PAP | Yeoh Ghim Seng | 5th |
| 9 | | Tan Soo Khoon; MP for Alexandra (born 1949) | 6 March 1985 | 17 August 1988 | PAP | Yeoh Ghim Seng | 6th |
| 10 | | Lim Boon Heng; MP for Kebun Baru SMC (born 1947) | 16 January 1989 | 13 August 1991 | PAP | Tan Soo Khoon | 7th |
| 11 | | Abdullah Tarmugi; MP for Siglap SMC (born 1944) | 16 January 1989 | 13 August 1991 | PAP | Tan Soo Khoon | 7th |
| (11) | | Abdullah Tarmugi; MP for Bedok GRC (born 1944) | 13 January 1992 | 30 June 1993 | PAP | Tan Soo Khoon | 8th |
| 12 | | Eugene Yap; MP for Mountbatten SMC | 26 February 1993 | 15 December 1996 | PAP | Tan Soo Khoon | 8th |
| (12) | | Eugene Yap; MP for Marine Parade GRC | 2 June 1997 | 17 October 2001 | PAP | Tan Soo Khoon | 9th |
| (13) | | Lim Hwee Hua; MP for Marine Parade GRC (born 1959) | 1 April 2002 | 11 August 2004 | PAP | Abdullah Tarmugi | 10th |
| 14 | | Chew Heng Ching; MP for East Coast GRC (born 1953) | 1 April 2002 | 19 April 2006 | PAP | Abdullah Tarmugi | 10th |
| 15 | | S. Iswaran; MP for West Coast GRC (born 1962) | 1 September 2004 | 19 April 2006 | PAP | Abdullah Tarmugi | 10th |
| 16 | | Indranee Rajah; MP for Tanjong Pagar GRC (born 1963) | 8 November 2006 | 18 April 2011 | PAP | Abdullah Tarmugi | 11th |
| 17 | | Matthias Yao; MP for Marine Parade GRC (born 1956) | 8 November 2006 | 18 April 2011 | PAP | Abdullah Tarmugi | 11th |
| 18 | | Seah Kian Peng; MP for Marine Parade GRC (born 1961) | 17 October 2011 | 24 August 2015 | PAP | Michael Palmer (until 2012) Charles Chong (2012–2013); Acting Halimah Yacob (from 2013) | 12th |
| 19 | | Charles Chong; MP for Punggol East SMC (born 1953) | 17 October 2011 | 24 August 2015 | PAP | Michael Palmer (until 2012) Charles Chong (2012–2013); Acting Halimah Yacob (from 2013) | 12th |
| (19) | | Charles Chong; MP for Punggol East SMC (born 1953) | 25 January 2016 | 22 June 2020 | PAP | Halimah Yacob (until 2017) Charles Chong (2017); Acting Tan Chuan-Jin (from 2017) | 13th |
| 20 | | Lim Biow Chuan; MP for Mountbatten SMC (born 1963) | 25 January 2016 | 22 June 2020 | PAP | Halimah Yacob (until 2017) Charles Chong (2017); Acting Tan Chuan-Jin (from 2017) | 13th |
| 21 | | Jessica Tan; MP for East Coast GRC (born 1966) | 31 August 2020 | 14 April 2025 | PAP | Tan Chuan-Jin (until 2023) Jessica Tan (2023); Acting Seah Kian Peng (from 2023) | 14th |
| 22 | | Christopher de Souza; MP for Holland–Bukit Timah GRC (born 1976) | 31 August 2020 | 14 April 2025 | PAP | Tan Chuan-Jin (until 2023) Jessica Tan (2023); Acting Seah Kian Peng (from 2023) | 14th |
| (22) | | Christopher de Souza; MP for Holland–Bukit Timah GRC (born 1976) | 22 September 2025 | Incumbent | PAP | Seah Kian Peng | 15th |
| 23 | | Xie Yao Quan; MP for Jurong Central SMC (born 1984) | 22 September 2025 | Incumbent | PAP | Seah Kian Peng | 15th |

== See also ==
- Lists of members of parliament in Singapore
