= Yeoh Ghim Seng =

Singaporean politician (1918–1993)

Yeoh Ghim Seng BBM JP
- 杨锦成

President of Singapore
- Acting; 31 March 1985 – 2 September 1985
- Prime Minister: Lee Kuan Yew
- Preceded by: Wee Chong Jin (acting)
- Succeeded by: Wee Kim Wee
- Acting; 14 May 1981 – 23 October 1981
- Prime Minister: Lee Kuan Yew
- Preceded by: Benjamin Sheares
- Succeeded by: Devan Nair
- Acting; 23 November 1970 – 2 January 1971
- Prime Minister: Lee Kuan Yew
- Preceded by: Yusof Ishak
- Succeeded by: Benjamin Sheares

3rd Speaker of the Parliament of Singapore
- In office 27 January 1970 – 17 August 1988
- Deputy: Tang See Chim; Hwang Soo Jin; Tan Soo Khoon
- Preceded by: Punch Coomaraswamy
- Succeeded by: Tan Soo Khoon

Deputy Speaker of the Parliament of Singapore
- In office 11 July 1968 – 26 January 1970
- Preceded by: Punch Coomaraswamy
- Succeeded by: Tang See Chim

Member of the Singapore Parliament for Joo Chiat Constituency
- In office 2 November 1966 – 17 August 1988
- Preceded by: Fong Kim Heng
- Succeeded by: Constituency abolished

Personal details
- Born: Yeoh Ghim Seng; 22 June 1918 Ipoh, Perak, Federated Malay States, British Malaya
- Died: 3 June 1993 (aged 74) Singapore
- Cause of death: Lung cancer
- Resting place: Mount Vernon Crematorium
- Party: People's Action Party
- Education: University of Cambridge
- Profession: Surgeon

Yeoh Ghim Seng (Note: Chinese: 杨锦成; Pe̍h-ōe-jī: Iôⁿ Gím-sêng; pinyin: Yáng Jǐnchéng) (22 June 1918 – 3 June 1993) was a Singaporean politician who served as Speaker of the Parliament of Singapore between 1970 and 1988.

Yeoh was one of the longest-serving speakers of any parliament in the world. Yeoh served briefly as the acting president of Singapore between the death of Yusof Ishak on 23 November 1970 and the inauguration of President Benjamin Sheares on 2 January 1971.

== Early life and education ==
Yeoh was born on 22 June 1918 in Ipoh. He received his early education at St. Michael's Institution and at Penang Free School. Yeoh studied medicine at the Cambridge University, England in the 1940s and was attached to hospitals in England. He became a fellow of the Royal College of Surgeons of England in 1950.

== Medical career ==
In 1951, Yeoh left England for Singapore to become consultant surgeon to the Singapore General Hospital. In 1955, he was appointed professor of surgery at the University of Malaya. He resigned the chair in 1962 to set up his private practice, but continued to train medical graduates from the university. A six-footer, Yeoh was described once as "the biggest but fastest Asian surgeon".

== Political career ==
In 1966, Yeoh was recruited by the People's Action Party to stand in the Joo Chiat by-elections. The by-elections was uncontested and he was elected with a walkover. He would be the constituency's Member of Parliament for 22 years.

In 1968, Yeoh was appointed deputy speaker and elected speaker two years later.

When President of Singapore Yusof Ishak died on 23 November 1970 due to heart failure, Yeoh became the acting President, per the duties of the speaker, the following day.

In 1977, Minister of law, environment, science and technology, E. W. Barker, congratulating him on his re-election to yet another term as speaker, said that if not for Yeoh's commitment to surgery, he "could with ease and distinction occupy one of the front benches on this side of the House". As speaker, Yeoh's residence was the Command House.

In 1977, he also became the ASEAN Inter-Parliamentary Organization's (AIPO) first president.

Yeoh retired from politics in 1988.

== Awards ==
Yeoh was a Public Service Star (B.B.M.) recipient, an active Rotarian, and a justice of the peace who also served as chairman of various boards including the Detainees' Aftercare Association and the University of Singapore Council.

== Personal life ==
Yeoh's wife, Winnie Khong, was also from Ipoh, and they married in 1941 while both were studying in England.

Yeoh died on 3 June 1993 of lung cancer at the Singapore General Hospital. He had five daughters and 15 grandchildren.

== Legacy ==
In 1993, the National University of Singapore created the Yeoh Ghim Seng Professorship in Surgery in his honour.

== Notes ==
Parliament of Singapore
Preceded by Punch Coomaraswamy	Speaker of the Parliament of Singapore; 1970–1988	Succeeded by Tan Soo Khoon
Preceded by Punch Coomaraswamy	Deputy Speaker of the Parliament of Singapore; 1968–1970	Succeeded by Tang See Chim
Political offices
Preceded by Yusof Ishak as President of Singapore	President of Singapore (Acting); 1970–1971	Succeeded by Benjamin Henry Sheares as President of Singapore
Preceded by Benjamin Henry Sheares as President of Singapore	President of Singapore (Acting); 1981	Succeeded by Devan Nair as President of Singapore
Preceded by Wee Chong Jin as Acting President of Singapore	President of Singapore (Acting); 1985	Succeeded by Wee Kim Wee as President of Singapore
