= Raymond Lim =

Singaporean politician

- 林双吉

Minister for Transport
- In office 30 May 2006 – 20 May 2011
- Second Minister: Lim Hwee Hua (2009–2011)
- Preceded by: Yeo Cheow Tong
- Succeeded by: Lui Tuck Yew

Minister in the Prime Minister's Office
- In office 1 April 2005 – 29 May 2006

Member of the Singapore Parliament for East Coast GRC (Fengshan)
- In office 25 October 2001 – 24 August 2015
- Preceded by: Chng Hee Kok
- Succeeded by: Cheryl Chan (Fengshan SMC)

Personal details
- Born: Raymond Lim Siang Keat; 24 June 1959 (age 67) State of Singapore
- Party: People's Action Party
- Education: University of Adelaide; Balliol College, Oxford; King's College, Cambridge

Raymond Lim Siang Keat (Note: Chinese: 林双吉; Pe̍h-ōe-jī: Lîm Siang-kiat; pinyin: Lín Shuāngjí) (born 24 June 1959) is a Singaporean former politician. A member of the governing People's Action Party (PAP), Lim was a Member of Parliament (MP) representing the East Coast Group Representation Constituency for Fengshan from 2001 to 2015. He served as the Minister for Transport from 2006 to 2011, and as a Minister in the Prime Minister's Office from 2005 to 2006. When taking on the transport portfolio, he was informed by Lee Kuan Yew that this was a "thankless job" but that "someone has to do it".

Lim retired from politics in 2015 and is presently Executive Chairman of APS Asset Management and Senior Advisor to the Swire Group. In 2013, at the launch of a book he published, he advocated for individuals to speak against populism, saying that an engaged citizenry was "far better" than a "switched-off" one.

== Education ==
Lim was a Rhodes Scholar and Colombo Plan scholar and holds degrees from the universities of Adelaide, Oxford and King's College, Cambridge (LLM, 1987). Prior to his university education, he was a student and athlete in Raffles Institution.

Before taking on political office, he held numerous positions in the financial industry which he joined after serving as a law lecturer at the National University of Singapore and working as a reporter at The Straits Times.

== Personal life ==
Lim's brother, Benny Lim Siang Hoe, was director of the Internal Security Department and was also permanent secretary of the Ministry of Home Affairs (2005–2011), Prime Minister's Office (2011–2016), Ministry of National Development (2011–2016) and National Security Coordination Secretariat (2011–2016). Lim Siang Hoe also served as a director of SBS Transit from 2018 to 2021, and chairman of Temasek Foundation from 2020 to 2024.

Parliament of Singapore
| Preceded by Chng Hee Kok | Member of Parliament for East Coast GRC (Fengshan); 2001–2015 | Succeeded by Cheryl Chan as MP for Fengshan SMC |
Political offices
| Preceded by ? | Minister in the Prime Minister's Office; 2005–2006 | Succeeded by N.A. |
| Preceded by Yeo Cheow Tong | Minister for Transport; 2006–2011 | Succeeded by Lui Tuck Yew |
