= Lee Yi Shyan =

Singaporean politician

- 李奕贤
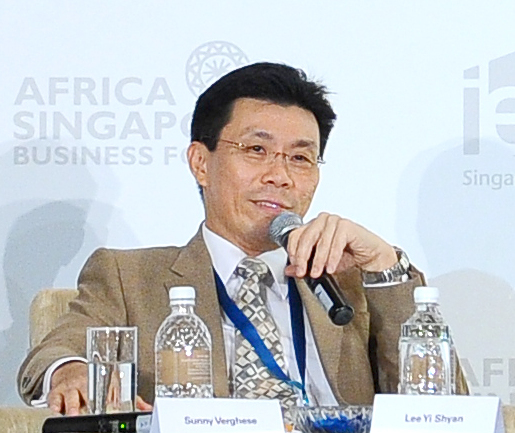
- Lee in 2012

Member of the Singapore Parliament for East Coast GRC (Kampong Chai Chee)
- In office 6 May 2006 – 23 June 2020
- Preceded by: Tan Soo Khoon
- Succeeded by: Tan Kiat How

Senior Minister of State, Ministry for Trade and Industry
- In office 1 August 2012 – 30 September 2015
- Prime Minister: Lee Hsien Loong
- Minister: Lim Hng Kiang
- Preceded by: S Iswaran

Senior Minister of State, Ministry for National Development
- In office 1 August 2012 – 30 September 2015
- Prime Minister: Lee Hsien Loong
- Minister: Khaw Boon Wan
- Preceded by: Tan Chuan-Jin
- Succeeded by: Desmond Lee Ti-Seng

Personal details
- Born: 9 March 1962 (age 64) Singapore
- Party: People's Action Party

Lee Yi Shyan (Chinese: 李奕贤; pinyin: Lǐ Yìxián; born 9 March 1962) is a Singaporean politician. In 2020, Lee retired and did not stand in the 2020 Singaporean general election.

A member of the governing People's Action Party (PAP), he served as Member of Parliament (MP) for East Coast Group Representation Constituency (GRC) for Kampong Chai Chee from May 2006 to June 2020.

== Career ==
Lee joined OUE Limited as an Executive Advisor to the Chairman’s office in January 2016. He was also appointed as Deputy Chairman of OUE Hospitality Trust & Chairman of OUE (USA) in 2016. Mr Lee was appointed Chairman of Intercontinental Exchange in Nov 2016.

Lee is also the Chairman of Business China. Business China is a non-profit organization inaugurated in 2007 by Singapore’s Founding Prime Minister Mr Lee Kuan Yew as a business and social link bridging Singapore and China.

Lee worked at the Ministry of Defence (MINDEF) from 1987 to 1991. He then joined the Economic Development Board, and was based in Washington DC and Chicago from 1993 to 1997, thereafter in Suzhou, China, from 1997 to 1998. In 2000, Lee was appointed Deputy Chief Executive Officer at the Productivity and Standards Board. The following year, he was appointed Chief Executive Officer of International Enterprise Singapore.

=== Political career ===
Lee was elected to Parliament as a Member of Parliament (MP) for East Coast GRC in the 2006 general election. Following the election, he was made a Minister of State at the Ministry of Trade and Industry. From 2009 to 2011, he took on the additional portfolio of Minister of State at the Ministry of Manpower.

At the 2011 general election, Lee was re-elected as an MP for East Coast GRC. He remained a Minister of State at the Ministry of Trade and Industry after the election, and also became a Minister of State at the Ministry of National Development.

As the Minister of State for Manpower from 2009 to 2011, Lee oversaw and spearheaded the research and developmental efforts of the National Productivity Taskforce, a joint initiative by the Ministry of Manpower and Ministry of Trade and Industry . He was also a member of the National Productivity and Continuing Education Council.

As Minister of State for Trade and Industry, Lee co-chaired the Singapore-Jiangsu Co-operation Council and the Singapore-Shandong Business Council. He is a member of the China-Singapore Joint Committee for Bilateral Co-operation, the Joint Ministerial Committee of the Tianjin Eco-City and the Guangzhou Knowledge City Steering Committee. He has also been the Co-Chairman of the Abu Dhabi-Singapore Joint Forum and a member of the Qatar-Singapore High Level Joint Committee.

Lee was the Minister-in-charge of Entrepreneurship from 2006 to 2011, during which time he chaired the Action Community for Entrepreneurship.

As Minister of State for National Development, Lee oversees urban planning, city development and town council issues. He also spearheads Singapore's collaboration with China in the Tianjin Eco-City project, and chairs the Quality Service Advisory Council of public services.

In addition, Lee led the grounds-up effort for the “Cool Ideas for Better HDB Living” initiative. The initiative aims to solve daily inconveniences faced by HDB residents and improve the HDB living environment, through ideas contributed by members of the public.

Lee was promoted to Senior Minister of State on 31 July 2012, but stepped down from his ministerial post in October 2015 after suffering from a mini stroke in May 2015. In 2020, Lee retired and did not stand in the 2020 Singaporean general election.

== Post-political career ==
In August 2026, Lee wrote in a Facebook post criticising the Workers' Party motion on Singapore's future economy and questioned their proposals to boost local companies. He cited how "MNCs (Multinational Corporation) in Singapore create opportunities for local companies, and help them build capabilities and reach new markets."

== Education ==
Lee was educated in Maris Stella High School and Hwa Chong Junior College, before going on to the National University of Singapore where he completed a Bachelor of Engineering in chemical engineering in 1986.

Lee completed an executive management programme at Harvard Business School in 1997, and a management programme at Tsinghua University in 2001.

== Personal life ==
Lee is married and has two children. He is an avid badminton player and was the President of the Singapore Badminton Association.

Lee suffered from a mini stroke in May 2015.

Parliament of Singapore
Preceded by Tan Soo Khoon	Member of Parliament for East Coast GRC (Kampong Chai Chee); 2006 – 2020	Succeeded by Tan Kiat How
