= Fengshan Single Member Constituency =

Former electoral division in Singapore

Fengshan
- Former single-member constituency for the Parliament of Singapore
- Region: East Region, Singapore
- Electorate: 23,733

Former constituency
- Created: 1984; 42 years ago
- Abolished: 2020; 6 years ago
- Member: Constituency abolished
- Town Council: East Coast–Fengshan
- Merged: 1991, 2020
- Merged to: Bedok GRC (1991); East Coast GRC (2020)
- Reformed: 2015
- Reformed from: East Coast GRC

Fengshan Single Member Constituency was a former single-member constituency (SMC) in eastern Singapore. At abolition, it was managed by East Coast–Fengshan Town Council.

== History ==
=== First existence (1984–1991) ===
Fengshan Constituency was created prior to the 1984 general election from parts of the constituencies of Bedok, Changi and Kampong Chai Chee. Arthur Beng from the governing People's Action Party (PAP) defeated Chng Chin Siah from the Singapore United Front (SUF) with 65.13% of the vote.

During the 1988 general election, the constituency was renamed Fengshan Single Member Constituency with the creation of group representation constituencies (GRCs). Beng won reelection with a decreased 57.92% of the vote in a rematch against Chng, who had since joined the Workers' Party (WP).

Prior to the 1991 general election, Fengshan SMC was abolished and merged to Bedok GRC.

=== Second existence (2015–2020) ===
Prior to the 2015 general election, Fengshan SMC was reformed from East Coast GRC, which it had previously belonged to as a division. In the election, PAP candidate Cheryl Chan defeated Dennis Tan, WP candidate and fellow newcomer, with 57.5% of the vote. Having obtained the second-best result among defeated opposition candidates, Tan accepted the second of three non-constituency MP (NCMP) seats offered after the election.

In the leadup to the 2020 general election, Fengshan SMC was reabsorbed to East Coast GRC, which gained a seat in Parliament to become a five-member GRC.

== Member of Parliament ==
Year	Member	Party
Formation
1984	Arthur Beng	PAP
1988	Arthur Beng	PAP
Constituency abolished (1991)
2015	Cheryl Chan	PAP
Constituency abolished (2020)

== Electoral results ==
Note: The Elections Department does not include rejected votes when calculating the vote shares of candidates. Hence, all candidates' vote shares will total to 100% at any given election (may not appear so in multi-way contests due to rounding).

=== Elections in 1980s ===
General Election 1984
Party	Candidate	Votes	%
PAP	Arthur Beng	11,216	65.13
SUF	Chng Chin Siah	6,605	34.87
Turnout		17,737	96.4
PAP win (new seat)			

General Election 1988
Party	Candidate	Votes	%	±%
PAP	Arthur Beng	9,507	57.92	▼7.21
WP	Chng Chin Siah	6,907	42.08	N/A
Turnout		16,764	96.4	Steady
PAP hold		Swing	▼7.21	

=== Elections in 2010s ===
General Election 2015
Party	Candidate	Votes	%
PAP	Cheryl Chan	12,417	57.50
WP	Dennis Tan	9,176	42.50
Majority		3241	15.00
Rejected ballots		290	1.35
Turnout		21,883	93.25
PAP win (new seat)			
