= Cheryl Chan =

Singaporean politician

Cheryl Chan PBM
- 陈慧玲
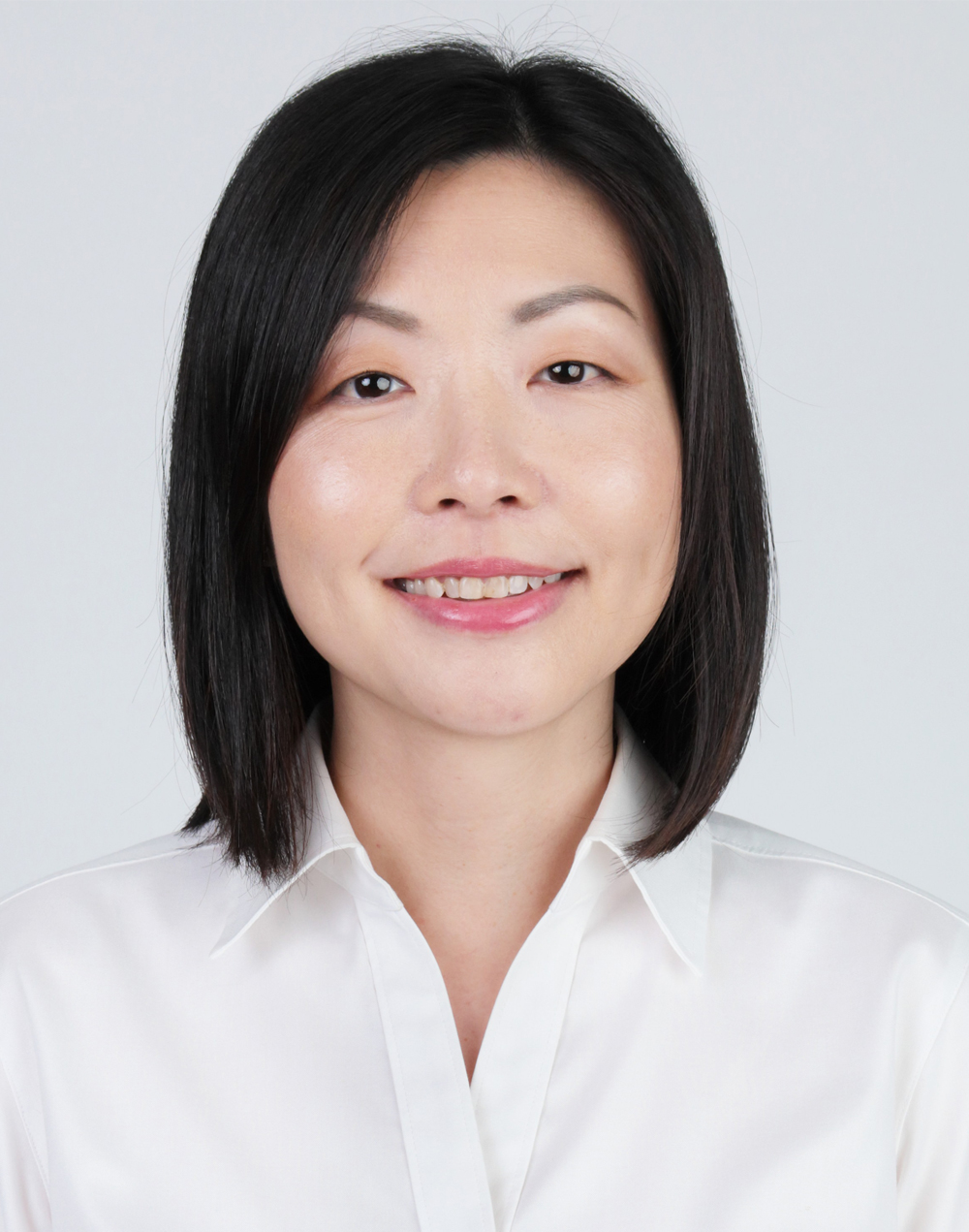
- Official portrait, 2021

Member of the Singapore Parliament for East Coast GRC
- In office 10 July 2020 – 15 April 2025
- Preceded by: PAP held
- Succeeded by: PAP held
- Majority: 7,769 (6.78%)

Member of the Singapore Parliament for Fengshan SMC
- In office 11 September 2015 – 23 June 2020
- Preceded by: Constituency established
- Succeeded by: Constituency abolished
- Majority: 3,241 (15.00%)

Personal details
- Born: Cheryl Chan Wei Ling; 1976 (age 49–50) Singapore
- Party: People's Action Party
- Relations: Chan Choy Siong (aunt); Ong Pang Boon (uncle)
- Education: Nanyang Technological University (BAS); Macquarie Graduate School of Management (MBA)
- Occupation: Politician; businesswoman

Cheryl Chan Wei Ling (Note: Chinese: 陈慧玲; pinyin: Chén Huìlíng) PBM (born 1976) is a Singaporean businesswoman and retired politician. A member of the governing People's Action Party (PAP), she was the Member of Parliament (MP) for Fengshan Single Member Constituency (SMC) between 2015 and 2020 and the Fengshan division of East Coast Group Representation Constituency (GRC) between 2020 and 2025.

== Education ==
Chan attended Singapore Chinese Girls' School and Catholic Junior College before graduating from the Nanyang Technological University in 1999 with a Bachelor of Applied Science with honours degree in materials engineering.

She subsequently went on to complete a Master of Business Administration degree at the Macquarie Graduate School of Management in 2004.

Chan was awarded the Nanyang Outstanding Young Alumni Award in 2016.

== Career ==
Prior to joining ST Engineering in July 2021, Cheryl was Head of APAC Clean Hydrogen in Linde, a leading global industrial gases and engineering company. In her 14 years with the company, she had held various global and APAC management positions in corporate strategy, product portfolio management and marketing, supply chain operations, project integration and business development. She also led the merger and integration of Praxair and Linde for the APAC Management Office.

Chan is currently the Group Chief Strategy and Sustainability Officer and President New Ventures of ST Engineering, a global technology, defence and engineering group with a diverse portfolio of businesses across the aerospace, smart city, defence and public security segments.

=== Political career ===
On 27 August 2015, PAP announced that Chan would contest in the revived Fengshan SMC in the 2015 general election. Chan was elected into Parliament when she defeated Dennis Tan of the Workers' Party and clinched 57.5% of the electorate valid votes.

Leading up to the 2020 general election, the Electoral Boundaries Review Committee updated Singapore's electoral boundaries, in which Fengshan SMC would be absorbed into East Coast GRC. Chan would contest in the 2020 general election under the PAP's ticket in East Coast GRC against the Workers' Party, alongside Heng Swee Keat, Maliki Osman, Jessica Tan, and Tan Kiat How. On 11 July 2020, Chan and the PAP team were declared elected Members of Parliament for East Coast GRC after garnering 53.41% of the valid votes. She was then appointed Chairperson of National Development Government Parliamentary Committee (GPC) in the 14th Parliament. Chan was appointed as Vice-Chairperson of East Coast Town Council since 2020.

Chan retired from politics on 21 April 2025, citing a desire to spend more time with her family.

== Awards ==
- 2013: As chairperson of Fengshan Community Club Management Committee (CCMC), Chan was awarded the Pingat Bakti Masyarakat (Public Service Medal).
- 2016: Nanyang Outstanding Young Alumni Award.

== Notes ==
Parliament of Singapore
| Preceded by Raymond Lim as MP for East Coast GRC (Fengshan) | Member of Parliament for Fengshan SMC; 2015–2020 | Succeeded by Herself as MP for East Coast GRC (Fengshan SMC) |
| Preceded by Herself as MP for Fengshan SMC | Member of Parliament for East Coast GRC (Fengshan); 2020–2025 | Succeeded by Dinesh Vasu Dash |
