= Abdullah Tarmugi =

Singaporean politician

- عبد الله موعي
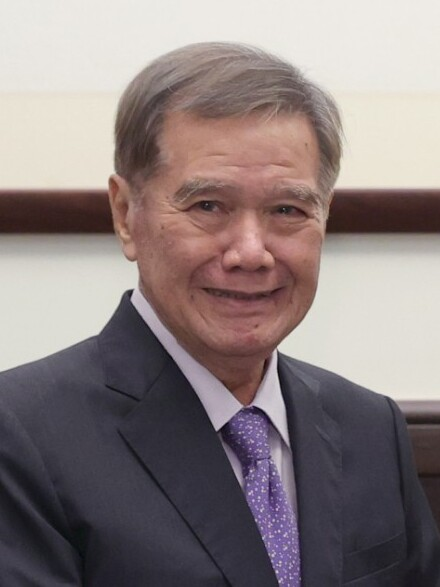
- Abdullah in 2024

5th Speaker of the Parliament of Singapore
- In office 25 March 2002 – 19 April 2011
- Deputy: Matthias Yao Chih; Indranee Rajah; S. Iswaran; Chew Heng Ching; Lim Hwee Hua
- Preceded by: Tan Soo Khoon
- Succeeded by: Michael Palmer

Minister-in-charge of Muslim Affairs
- In office 30 June 1993 – 24 March 2002
- Prime Minister: Goh Chok Tong
- Preceded by: Ahmad Mattar
- Succeeded by: Yaacob Ibrahim

Member of the Singapore Parliament for East Coast GRC
- In office 2 January 1997 – 19 April 2011
- Preceded by: Constituency established
- Succeeded by: PAP held

Member of the Singapore Parliament for Bedok GRC
- In office 21 August 1991 – 16 December 1996
- Preceded by: PAP held
- Succeeded by: Constituency abolished
- Majority: 18,988 (23.96%)

Member of the Singapore Parliament for Siglap SMC
- In office 22 December 1984 – 14 August 1991
- Preceded by: Abdul Rahim Ishak (PAP)
- Succeeded by: Constituency abolished

Personal details
- Born: 25 August 1944 (age 82) Japanese-occupied Singapore
- Party: People's Action Party (1984–2011)
- Spouse: Shirley Abdullah
- Education: Raffles Institution; University of Singapore; University of London

Abdullah bin Tarmugi (Note: Jawi: عبدالله بن ترموڬي) (born 25 August 1944) is a Singaporean former politician who served as Minister-in-charge of Muslim Affairs from 1993 to 2002 and Speaker of the Parliament of Singapore between 2002 and 2011. A member of the People's Action Party (PAP), Abdullah was a Member of Parliament (MP) for Siglap from 1984 to 2011.

== Early life ==
Abdullah was born in Singapore in 1944 to a Javanese father and a Chinese mother during the Japanese occupation of Singapore. He identifies with the Malay community and is a Muslim. Abdullah's father was a low-salaried surveyor's assistant and Abdullah's grandfather ran a provision shop.

Abdullah studied at Raffles Institution and obtained a Bachelor of Social Sciences from the University of Singapore, followed by a post-graduate diploma in urban studies from the University of London in 1972 under a Commonwealth Scholarship.

== Political career ==
Abdullah was a Member of Parliament from 1984 to 2011, starting out at Siglap constituency and later Bedok Group Representation Constituency (Bedok GRC) from 1991 to 1996. After Bedok GRC and Eunos GRC was merged to form East Coast GRC in 1997, Abdullah still remained in the Siglap ward but under East Coast GRC. Abdullah was the Minister for Community Development (subsequently the Minister of Community Development and Sports) and the Minister-in-charge of Muslim Affairs from 1994 to 2002 and 2000 to 2002 respectively. Abdullah was also the Deputy Speaker of Parliament from 1989 to 1993 before becoming the Speaker of Parliament on 25 March 2002. He declined to contest the Singapore Presidential Elections in 2017.

Abdullah announced his retirement from politics on 24 March 2011, prior to the 2011 general elections. In January 2012, Abdullah was appointed to the Presidential Council for Minority Rights by Singapore President Tony Tan and a permanent member by President Halimah Yacob in 2018.

== Personal life ==
Abdullah is married to Shirley Abdullah, a retired teacher and former principal of Monk's Hill Secondary School. She was his pre-university schoolmate at Raffles Institution. She is Chinese and had converted to Islam prior to their marriage. The couple have two children.

== Notes ==
Political offices
Preceded by Ahmad Mattar	Minister-in-charge of Muslim Affairs; 1 July 1993 – 24 March 2002	Succeeded by Yaacob Ibrahim
Preceded by Yeo Cheow Tong	Minister for Community Development; 15 January 1996 – 31 March 2000; Acting: 2 January 1994 – 14 January 1996	Succeeded by Yaacob Ibrahim
Preceded by Yeo Cheow Tong	Minister for Community Development and Sports; 1 April 2000 – 24 March 2002	Succeeded by Yaacob Ibrahim
Parliament of Singapore
Preceded by Tan Soo Khoon	Speaker of Parliament; 2002–2011	Succeeded by Michael Palmer
