= Tan Soo Khoon =

Singaporean politician

- 陈树群

4th Speaker of the Parliament of Singapore
- In office 9 January 1989 – 18 October 2001
- Deputy: Abdullah Tarmugi; Eugene Yap
- Preceded by: Yeoh Ghim Seng
- Succeeded by: Abdullah Tarmugi

Deputy Speaker of the Parliament of Singapore
- In office 1985–1989
- Preceded by: Hwang Soo Jin
- Succeeded by: Lim Boon Heng

Member of the Singapore Parliament for East Coast GRC
- In office 3 January 1997 – 20 April 2006
- Preceded by: Constituency established
- Succeeded by: PAP held
- Majority: 1997: N/A (walkover); 2001: N/A (walkover)

Member of the Singapore Parliament for Bedok GRC
- In office 21 August 1991 – 16 December 1996
- Preceded by: PAP held
- Succeeded by: Constituency abolished
- Majority: N/A (walkover)

Member of the Singapore Parliament for Brickworks GRC
- In office 3 September 1988 – 14 August 1991
- Preceded by: Constituency established
- Succeeded by: PAP held
- Majority: 13,893 (34.86%)

Member of the Singapore Parliament for Alexandra Constituency
- In office 23 December 1976 – 17 August 1988
- Preceded by: Wong Lin Ken (PAP)
- Succeeded by: Constituency abolished
- Majority: 1976: 8,472 (51.80%); 1980: N/A (walkover); 1984: 6,119 (33.58%)

Personal details
- Born: Tan Soo Khoon; 1 September 1949 (age 77) Colony of Singapore
- Party: People's Action Party
- Education: University of Singapore

Tan Soo Khoon (Note: Chinese: 陈树群; Pe̍h-ōe-jī: Tân Sū-kûn; pinyin: Chén Shùqún) (born 1 September 1949) is a Singaporean former politician who served as Speaker of the Parliament of Singapore between 1989 and 2001.

== Education ==
Tan attended the Anglo-Chinese School, and obtained both his Cambridge O-Level and A-level certifications there before graduating from the University of Singapore in 1971 with an honours degree in business administration. He also served as the general secretary of the students' union of the University of Singapore in 1969.

== Political career ==
Tan started assisting in the Kuo Chuan constituency in 1971, where he learned about the needs of the working-class in Singapore society.

Tan Soo Khoon’s parliamentary speeches, which often address social equality and the welfare of disadvantaged groups, have been noted by fellow MPs.

Tan took a 13-year break from speech-making when he became speaker. He is remembered for his fairness to both sides of the floor of the house, allowing members of both the governing party and the opposition to speak their minds. He is also remembered for his sense of humor, for his notes to fellow MPs would be signed off "The Watchman", a take on his private business, and his role as speaker.

During his stint as the speaker, he was also president of the AIPO (ASEAN Inter-Parliamentary Organization) for the 1989–1990, 1994–1995 and 1999–2000 sessions. He also served as acting president of Singapore on a number of occasions when the president and deputy prime minister were both out of the country on official business.

During the 1991 general election, Tan left Bricksworks GRC to contest Bedok GRC.

Tan also supervised the building of the new Parliament House, heading the Committee on the Parliament Complex Development Project. The new building was completed in 1999, and a ceremony was conducted to officiate the "move" from the old Parliament House near the Supreme Court to the new one along the Singapore River.

In April 2002, when he stepped down as speaker after 13 years, Tan immediately made it known that as a backbencher, with his brutal honesty and openness, he could still "shake the House". Many of his speeches provided witty, pointed, even scathing, remarks about certain government policies and expenditures, such as the extravagance of certain public buildings and the rising cost of public transportation.

In a tribute by Prime Minister Lee Hsien Loong on 15 April 2006, he said of Tan, "He makes very good speeches in Parliament. Sometimes, he draws blood... Sometimes he has offended ministers, but he has spoken his mind."

== Personal life ==
Tan's maternal grandfather is Lee Wee Nam, born 1880, who was one of the prominent Teochew Chinese figures in Singapore. Lee was the founder of Lee Hiok Kee Pte Ltd and chairman of the Four Seas Communications Bank.

== Notes ==
Parliament of Singapore
New constituency	Member of Parliament for Alexandra Constituency; 1976 – 1988	Constituency abolished
