= East Coast Group Representation Constituency =

Electoral division in Singapore

Coordinates: 1.32°N 103.94°E

East Coast
- Kawasan Undi Perwakilan Berkumpulan Pantai Timur 东海岸集选区 கிழக்கு கடற்கரை குழுப் பிரதிநிதித்துவத் தொகுதி
- Group Representation constituency for the Parliament of Singapore
- Region: East Region, Singapore
- Electorate: 151,073

Current constituency
- Created: 1997; 29 years ago
- Seats: 5
- Party: People's Action Party
- Members: Dinesh Vasu Dash; Hazlina Abdul Halim; Tan Kiat How; Jessica Tan; Edwin Tong
- Town Council: East Coast
- Created from: Bedok GRC; Eunos GRC

The East Coast Group Representation Constituency is a five-member Group Representation Constituency (GRC) in the eastern area of Singapore. It consists of locations such as East Coast Park, Bedok, Changi (in part), Simei, Siglap, Joo Chiat and Chai Chee. A large portion of Singapore's eastern territorial waters also belongs to the GRC. It is divided into the divisions of Bedok, Changi–Simei, Fengshan, Kampong Chai Chee and Joo Chiat, which are managed by East Coast Town Council. The current Members of Parliament (MPs) are Dinesh Vasu Dash, Jessica Tan, Hazlina Abdul Halim, Tan Kiat How and Second Minister for Home Affairs and Minister of Law Edwin Tong from the People's Action Party (PAP).

== History ==
East Coast GRC was formed in 1997 as a six-member GRC, a merger of the GRCs of Bedok and Eunos. It was downsized from six members to five following the redrawing of divisions into Marine Parade GRC in 2006.

Joo Chiat Single Member Constituency was carved out of the GRC in 2001, and was later absorbed by Marine Parade GRC for the 2015 elections. A large portion of the Kaki Bukit division and 60% of Kampong Chai Chee was transferred from East Coast GRC to Marine Parade GRC. Chew Heng Ching, Tan Soo Khoon and Lee Yock Suan left Parliament due to old age in 2006, followed by S Jayakumar and Abdullah Tarmugi in 2011.

The offshore island of Coney Island was transferred to Pasir Ris–Punggol GRC in 2015, while Fengshan SMC was carved out and East Coast GRC was left with four members. East Coast GRC was increased in size to five after the elimination of Fengshan SMC in preparation for the 2020 general election.

The People's Action Party (PAP) won in a walkover in the 1997 and 2001 general elections. It saw its first contest in the 2006 general election from the Workers' Party (WP) and has since seen straight fights between the two parties. In both 2011 and 2015, WP candidates entered parliament as non-constituency MPs (NCMPs) via the GRC.

In October 2015, Lee Yi Shyan stepped down from his ministerial post after suffering from a stroke in May of the same year.

Prior to the 2020 general election, incumbent MP Lim Swee Say retired from politics. During Nomination Day on 30 June 2020, Deputy Prime Minister Heng Swee Keat was nominated for East Coast GRC instead of Tampines GRC, which he had been representing for two terms since 2011. The move surprised political observers but was explained as Heng filling a succession gap for Lim. When campaigning, Heng gave what The Economist described as a "disastrous speech" to unveil the PAP's manifesto for East Coast GRC called "Together We Care @ East Coast", during which he inspired internet memes and ridicule after failing to give his speech. The plan became popularly known as the "East Coast Plan" among Singaporeans and on social media.

On 10 July 2020, the five-member PAP team led by Heng won 53.41% of the vote against the Workers' Party. It was the second closest result after West Coast GRC.

In 2025, Loyang, Flora, Changi Village, Changi Airfreight Centre and Changi Airport, which had been in Siglap ward, were moved to the newly created Pasir Ris–Changi GRC. Changi South and Changi Business Park were merged into the Changi–Simei ward after the election. The GRC also absorbed Joo Chiat ward from the defunct Marine Parade GRC. The Fengshan ward was merged with the remainder of Siglap.

Ahead of the 2025 general election, incumbent MP Cheryl Chan announced her retirement from politics on 21 April 2025, citing a desire to spend more time with family. On 23 April 2025, the Nomination Day for the 2025 general election, Heng appeared at the nomination center but was not listed in the nomination papers for East Coast GRC nor other constituencies. Heng subsequently confirmed that he would not contest the election in a Facebook post. The PAP team contesting the GRC consisted of incumbent East Coast MPs Tan Kiat How and Jessica Tan, two political newcomers, Dinesh Vasu Dash and Hazlina Abdul Halim, and Minister for Culture, Community and Youth Edwin Tong, who led the team after his ward of Joo Chiat was transferred from Marine Parade GRC. WP fielded a team, consisting of Yee Jenn Jong, who was the team leader and a former NCMP, Nathaniel Koh, Paris V. Parameswari, Sufyan Mikhail Putra and Jasper Kuan, to contest the GRC. The PAP team won the contest with almost 59 percent of the votes, an increase of around 5.5 percent.

== Members of Parliament ==
Divisions or wards of East Coast GRC as of the 2025 general election:
1 Bedok
2 Changi-Simei
3 Fengshan
4 Joo Chiat
5 Kampong Chai Chee (part)
6 Kampong Chai Chee (part)

Year	Division	Members of Parliament	Party
Formation
1997	Bedok; Fengshan; Joo Chiat; Kaki Bukit; Kampong Chai Chee; Siglap	S. Jayakumar; Chng Hee Kok; Chan Soo Sen; Chew Heng Ching; Tan Soo Khoon; Abdullah Tarmugi	PAP
2001	Bedok; Changi-Simei; Fengshan; Kaki Bukit; Kampong Chai Chee; Siglap	S. Jayakumar; Lee Yock Suan; Raymond Lim; Chew Heng Ching; Tan Soo Khoon; Abdullah Tarmugi	PAP
2006	Bedok; Changi-Simei; Fengshan; Kampong Chai Chee; Siglap	S. Jayakumar; Jessica Tan; Raymond Lim; Lee Yi Shyan; Abdullah Tarmugi	PAP
2011	Bedok; Changi-Simei; Fengshan; Kampong Chai Chee; Siglap	Lim Swee Say; Jessica Tan; Raymond Lim; Lee Yi Shyan; Maliki Osman	PAP
2015	Bedok; Changi-Simei; Kampong Chai Chee; Siglap	Lim Swee Say; Jessica Tan; Lee Yi Shyan; Maliki Osman	PAP
2020	Bedok; Changi-Simei; Fengshan; Kampong Chai Chee; Siglap	Heng Swee Keat; Jessica Tan; Cheryl Chan; Tan Kiat How; Maliki Osman	PAP
2025	Bedok; Changi-Simei; Fengshan; Kampong Chai Chee; Joo Chiat	Dinesh Vasu Dash; Jessica Tan; Hazlina Abdul Halim; Tan Kiat How; Edwin Tong	PAP

== Electoral results ==
Note: The Elections Department does not include rejected votes when calculating the vote shares of candidates. Hence, all candidates' vote shares will total to 100% at any given election (may not appear so in multi-way contests due to rounding).

=== Elections in 1990s ===
General Election 1997: East Coast GRC
Party	Candidate	Votes	%
PAP	S Jayakumar; Chng Hee Kok; Chan Soo Sen; Chew Heng Ching; Tan Soo Khoon; Abdullah Tarmugi	Unopposed	
Registered electors		142,201	
PAP win (new seat)			

=== Elections in 2000s ===
General Election 2001: East Coast GRC
Party	Candidate	Votes	%	±%
PAP	S Jayakumar; Lee Yock Suan; Raymond Lim; Chew Heng Ching; Tan Soo Khoon; Abdullah Tarmugi	Unopposed		
Registered electors		144,012		
PAP hold				

General Election 2006: East Coast GRC
Party	Candidate	Votes	%	±%
PAP	S Jayakumar Jessica Tan Raymond Lim Lee Yi Shyan Abdullah Tarmugi	66,931	63.9	N/A
WP	Abdul Rahim Abdul Rahman Brandon Siow Chia Ti Lik Eric Tan Perry Tong	37,873	36.1	N/A
Turnout		107,028	91.7	N/A
PAP hold				

=== Elections in 2010s ===
General Election 2011: East Coast GRC
Party	Candidate	Votes	%	±%
PAP	Lim Swee Say Jessica Tan Raymond Lim Lee Yi Shyan Maliki Osman	59,992	54.8	▼9.1
WP	Gerald Giam Png Eng Huat Mohd Fazli Talip Eric Tan Glenda Han	49,429	45.2	▲9.1
Majority		10,563	9.6	N/A
Turnout		111,269	92.5	N/A
PAP hold		Swing	▼9.1	

General Election 2015: East Coast GRC
Party	Candidate	Votes	%	±%
PAP	Lim Swee Say Jessica Tan Lee Yi Shyan Maliki Osman	54,981	60.73	▲5.9
WP	Gerald Giam Daniel Goh Leon Perera Mohamed Fairoz Bin Shariff	35,547	39.27	▼5.9
Majority		19,434	21.4	▲11.8
Rejected ballots		1,008	1.02	
Turnout		99,118		−
PAP hold		Swing	▲5.9	

=== Elections in 2020s ===
General Election 2020
Party	Candidate	Votes	%	±%
PAP	Heng Swee Keat Jessica Tan Cheryl Chan Tan Kiat How Maliki Osman	61,144	53.39	▼7.34
WP	Nicole Seah Kenneth Foo Abdul Shariff Aboo Kassim Terence Tan Dylan Ng	53,375	46.61	▲7.34
Majority		7,769	6.78	▼14.62
Total valid votes		114,519	98.80	
Rejected ballots		1,393	1.20	
Turnout		115,912	95.29	
Registered electors		121,644		
PAP hold		Swing	▼7.34	

General Election 2025
Party	Candidate	Votes	%	±%
PAP	Edwin Tong Jessica Tan Tan Kiat How Dinesh Vasu Dash Hazlina Abdul Halim	80,105	58.73	▲5.34
WP	Yee Jenn Jong Nathaniel Koh Paris V. Parameswari Sufyan Mikhail Putra Jasper Kuan	56,288	41.27	▼5.34
Majority		23,817	17.46	▲10.68
Total valid votes		136,393	98.86	▲0.06
Rejected ballots		1,570	1.14	▼0.06
Turnout		137,963	91.32	▼3.64
Registered electors		151,073		▲24.19
PAP hold		Swing	▲5.34	
