= Bachelor of Social Science =

Bachelor's degree awarded for undergraduate study in the social sciences

The Bachelor of Social Science (BSocSc or BSocSci) is an undergraduate degree. It typically requires three to four years of study in the social sciences at an institution of higher education, primarily found in the Commonwealth of Nations.

It can be distinguished from other standard undergraduate degrees as the Bachelor of Social Science is only focused on theory, social statistics, quantitative and qualitative social research, the philosophy of social science and the scientific method.

== Studies ==
Disciplines and areas of study of the Bachelor of Social Science include anthropology, criminology, economics, environmental planning, geography, community development, history, human ecology, human services, international development, industrial relations, international relations, political science, psychology, demography, public health, public policy, sustainability, statistics, sociology, and mass communication and journalism.

The Bachelor of Social Science can also be combined as a dual degree with a Bachelor of Arts, a Bachelor of Laws, a Bachelor of Education, a Bachelor of Social Work or a Bachelor of Economics. Studies and research can be advanced by an honours degree and other postgraduate work.
