= Maliki Osman =

Singaporean politician (born 1965)

Maliki Osman CBE
- مالكي عثمان
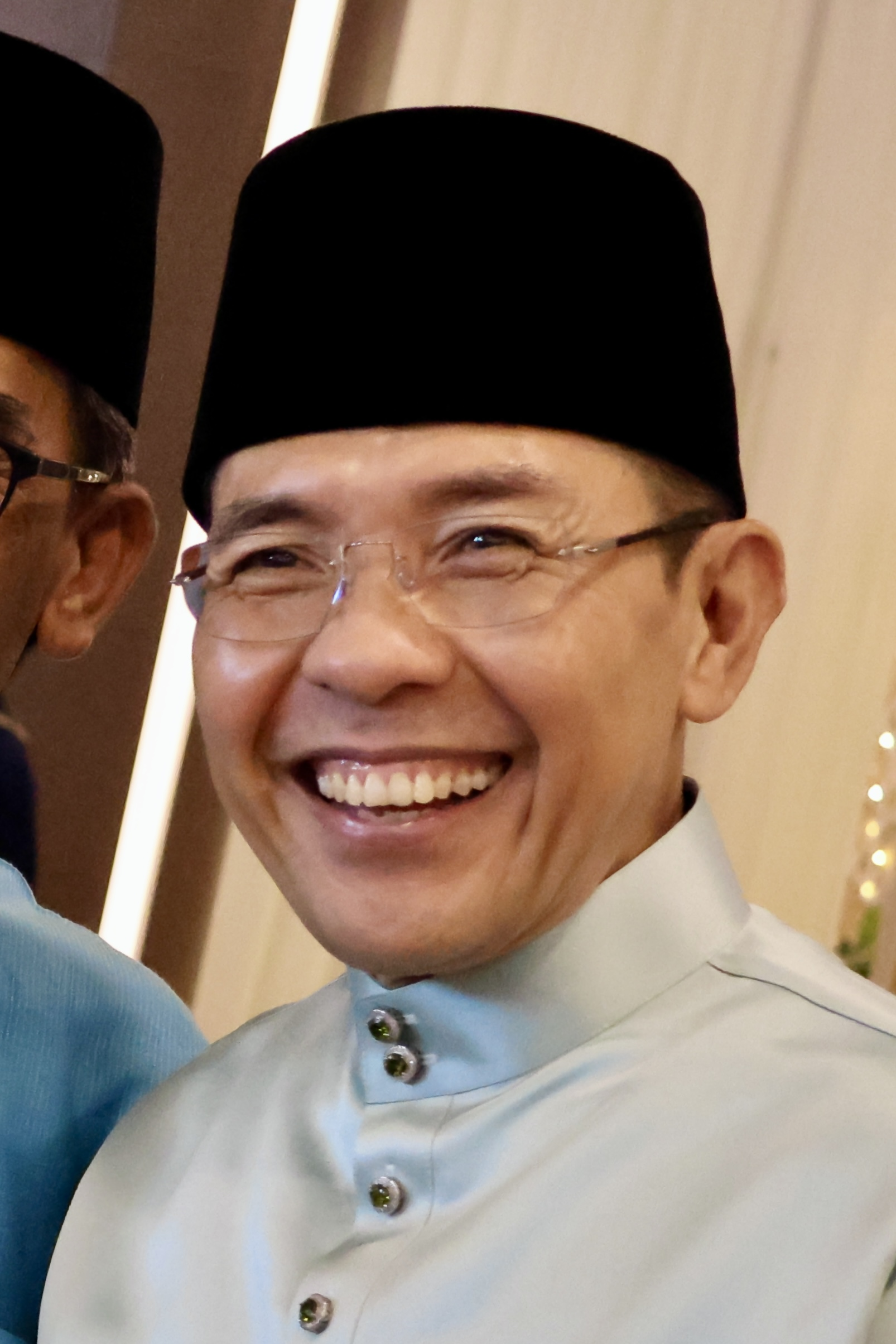
- Maliki in 2024

Minister in the Prime Minister's Office
- In office 27 July 2020 – 22 May 2025 Serving with Indranee Rajah (2018–present); Tan See Leng (2020–2021)
- Prime Minister: Lee Hsien Loong; Lawrence Wong
- Preceded by: Ng Chee Meng

Second Minister for Education
- In office 27 July 2020 – 22 May 2025
- Prime Minister: Lee Hsien Loong; Lawrence Wong
- Minister: Lawrence Wong (2020–2021); Chan Chun Sing
- Preceded by: Indranee Rajah
- Succeeded by: Vacant

Second Minister for Foreign Affairs
- In office 27 July 2020 – 22 May 2025
- Prime Minister: Lee Hsien Loong; Lawrence Wong
- Minister: Vivian Balakrishnan
- Preceded by: Josephine Teo (2017)
- Succeeded by: Vacant
Junior ministerial offices
Senior Minister of State for Defence
In office 1 October 2015 – 26 July 2020
Prime Minister	Lee Hsien Loong
Minister	Ng Eng Hen
Preceded by	Chan Chun Sing
Succeeded by	Zaqy Mohamad
Senior Minister of State for Foreign Affairs
In office 1 October 2015 – 26 July 2020
Prime Minister	Lee Hsien Loong
Minister	Vivian Balakrishnan
Preceded by	Masagos Zulkifli
Succeeded by	Chee Hong Tat
Minister of State for Defence
In office 1 October 2013 – 30 September 2015
Prime Minister	Lee Hsien Loong
Minister	Ng Eng Hen
Preceded by	Lawrence Wong
Succeeded by	Position abolished
Minister of State for National Development
In office 1 May 2014 – 30 September 2015 Serving with Desmond Lee
Prime Minister	Lee Hsien Loong
Minister	Khaw Boon Wan
Preceded by	Position established
Succeeded by	Koh Poh Koon

Mayor of South East District
- In office 27 May 2011 – 26 July 2020
- Prime Minister: Lee Hsien Loong
- Preceded by: Matthias Yao
- Succeeded by: Fahmi Aliman

Member of the Singapore Parliament for East Coast GRC (Siglap)
- In office 7 May 2011 – 15 April 2025
- Preceded by: Abdullah Tarmugi
- Succeeded by: Valerie Lee as Pasir Ris-Changi GRC
- Majority: 7,769 (6.78%)

Member of the Singapore Parliament for Sembawang GRC (Admiralty)
- In office 25 October 2001 – 18 April 2011
- Preceded by: Constituency established
- Succeeded by: Vikram Nair

Personal details
- Born: Mohamad Maliki bin Osman; 19 July 1965 (age 61) Singapore
- Party: People's Action Party
- Spouse: Sadiah Shahal (m. 1992)
- Children: 2
- Education: National University of Singapore; University of Illinois at Urbana-Champaign
- Occupation: Politician; assistant professor

Mohamad Maliki bin Osman (Note: Jawi: محمد مالكي بن عثمان) (born 19 July 1965) is a former Singaporean politician and assistant professor who served as Minister in the Prime Minister's Office, Second Minister for Education and Second Minister for Foreign Affairs from 2020 to 2025. A member of the governing People's Action Party (PAP), he was the Member of Parliament (MP) representing the Siglap division of East Coast Group Representation Constituency from 2011 to 2025.

Before entering politics in the 2001 general election, Maliki was an assistant professor at the National University of Singapore's Department of Social Work and Psychology. After he was elected, he served in various positions at the Ministries of Defence, Foreign Affairs, and National Development before he became a full minister in 2020.

On 21 April 2025, Maliki announced his retirement from politics.

== Education ==
Maliki attended Duchess Primary School, Dunearn Secondary Technical School and First Toa Payoh Secondary School before graduating from the National University of Singapore (NUS) with a Bachelor of Arts degree, a Bachelor of Social Sciences degree with honours and a Master of Social Sciences degree. He subsequently went on to complete a PhD in social work at the University of Illinois Urbana-Champaign in 1998.

== Career ==
Maliki worked as an assistant professor in NUS's Department of Social Work and Psychology from 1998 to 2004.

=== Political career ===
Maliki was first elected to Parliament at the 2001 general election. In 2004, Maliki was appointed Parliamentary Secretary for Health (2004–2005) and Community Development, Youth and Sports (2004–2006). He was subsequently appointed Parliamentary Secretary for National Development (2005–2010).

In 2010, Maliki was promoted from Parliamentary Secretary to Senior Parliamentary Secretary for National Development. As part of his National Development portfolio, Maliki chaired the main Workgroup for the Geylang Serai redevelopment project, which included a Civic Centre Subgroup that oversaw the concept, design and facilities for the new civic centre - Wisma Geylang Serai. Following the 2011 general election, in addition to his portfolio at the Ministry of National Development, he also became Senior Parliamentary Secretary for Defence and Mayor of the South East District. In February 2013, Maliki launched a commemorative publication titled "The Making of Wisma Geylang Serai", and a design competition for the new civic centre. Maliki was tasked with chairing the workgroup on "Recognition and Benefits for NS" as part of the Committee on Strengthening National Service at the Ministry of Defence.

On 1 September 2013, after a Cabinet reshuffle, Maliki was promoted from Senior Parliamentary Secretary to Minister of State for Defence and National Development.

Following the 2015 general election, Maliki was promoted to Senior Minister of State for Defence and Foreign Affairs on 1 October 2015, relinquishing his previous post at the Ministry of National Development.

After the 2020 Singapore general election, Maliki was promoted to Minister in the Prime Minister's Office, Second Minister for Education and Second Minister for Foreign Affairs.

On 21 April 2025, Maliki announced that he will retire from politics and will not seek re-election in the upcoming 2025 Singapore general election, citing to make way for Hazlina Abdul Halim as a new candidate for East Coast GRC.

== Personal life ==
Maliki is married to Sadiah Shahal and has two children, Lidia Syahindah and Adli Mifzal.

== Notes ==
Political offices
Preceded by Ng Chee Meng	Minister in the Prime Minister’s Office; 2020 – 2025; Served alongside: Indranee Rajah, Tan See Leng	Succeeded by TBD
Parliament of Singapore
New constituency	Member of Parliament for Sembawang GRC (Admiralty); 2001 – 2011	Succeeded by Vikram Nair
Preceded by Abdullah Tarmugi	Member of Parliament for East Coast GRC (Siglap); 2011 – 2025	Succeeded by Hazlina Abdul Halim
Government offices
Preceded by Matthias Yao	Mayor of South East District; 2011 – 2020	Succeeded by Fahmi Aliman
