= Bedok Public Library =

Public library in Singapore

Coordinates: 1.3268532°N 103.931973°E

Bedok Public Library (Simplified Chinese: 勿洛社区图书馆) is a public library under the National Library Board network. It is located at 11 Bedok North Street 1, #02-03 & #03-04, Heartbeat@Bedok, Singapore 469662. The library was officially re-opened by Dr. Yaacob Ibrahim, Minister for Communications and Information at its new Heartbeat@Bedok premises on 28 October 2017. It is among a suite of community services provided at the new integrated complex, Heartbeat@Bedok.

== History ==
Formerly situated at 21 Bedok North Street 1, Singapore 469659, it was officially opened on 28 September 1985 by Professor S. Jayakumar, then Minister of Foreign Affairs as well as second Minister for Law, currently Senior Minister. With an area of 5,088 square metres, the library serves residents in the South East areas of Singapore (Bedok North, Bedok Reservoir, Bedok South, Frankel, Kaki Bukit and Kembangan). It was temporarily closed on 20 August 2017 and was relocated to Heartbeat@Bedok, having been officially reopened by Dr. Yaacob Ibrahim, Minister for Communications and Information on 28 October that year.

== Facilities ==
Bedok Public Library has a collection of approximately 200,000 books and over 300 magazines and 13,000 audio-visual titles. It has a seating capacity of 435 seats. Besides standard facilities such as the 24-hour bookdrop, multiple reading areas and multimedia stations, and event spaces, the library offers more services suitable for elderly patrons. These include large print books and electronic magnifiers. Facilities for other age groups include a study area space for teenagers and a Story Circle for children.

== Layout ==
The library covers an area of 4,150 square metres across the 2nd and 3rd stories at Heartbeat@Bedok.

=== 2nd floor ===
The lowest floor houses English-language fiction books, books for young adults, for-loan magazines and periodicals, a newspaper reading corner, audiobooks, CD-ROMs and DVDs for loan. A one-stop service, Discover Health@BECL, introduces the various aspects of health and fitness through exhibitions.

It also has a separate Malay Library Services which has the largest and most comprehensive collection of print and non-print materials in Malay within the network of NLB libraries. It also has computer systems for internet surfing, English non-fiction books, as well as Chinese and Tamil books.

=== 3rd floor ===
The upper storey comprises Singapore Collections, General fiction, a children's section and an early literacy section for young children.

== Location ==
The library is a short walk from the Bedok Bus Interchange and Bedok MRT station.
