= Bedok Point =

- Location: Bedok, Singapore
- Coordinates: 1°19′29.663″N 103°55′56.511″E
- Address: 799 New Upper Changi Road, Singapore 467351
- Opened: 16 December 2010; 15 years ago (Soft); 26 April 2011; 15 years ago (Official)
- Closed: 1 July 2022; 4 years ago
- Developer: Frasers Centrepoint
- Manager: Frasers Centrepoint
- Owner: Frasers Centrepoint Trust
- Num. of stores: 75
- Floors: 6 (including 2 basements)
- Parking: Paid Parking Provided (76 lots)
- Public transit: EW5 Bedok; Bedok

Bedok Point was a four-storey mall (with 2 basement stories) located in the town center of Bedok along New Upper Changi Road, and near Bedok MRT station. It was officially opened on 26 April 2011, following a soft opening on 16 December 2010. It had a range of shops, entertainment outlets, a bookstore and food outlets.

It is now being redeveloped for mixed use, comprising commercial units on the ground floor and residences on the upper floors.

== History ==
Built on the site of the former Bedok and Changi theatres, Bedok Point was completed in late 2010 as the first air-conditioned mall in Bedok until the opening of Bedok Mall in 2013 at the Bedok Bus Interchange site. It had 76 specialty tenants, including anchors such as Harvey Norman and mainly restaurants and cafes. In 2011, the mall was divested into Frasers Centrepoint Trust by its developer, Frasers Centrepoint Ltd.

Bedok Point ceased operations from 1 July 2022. This is attributed to declining footfall as it faced competition from Bedok Mall and recently opened malls in eastern Singapore. It will be demolished and redeveloped into a mixed-used development named Sky Eden @ Bedok. Demolition commenced in 2022 and the new development was completed in 2025.
