= Bedok =

Planning area and planned town in East Region, Singapore

- Planning Area and HDB Town

Other transcription(s)
  - Chinese: 勿洛; Wùluò (Pinyin); Bu̍t-lo̍k (Hokkien POJ)
  - Malay: Bedok بدوق (Jawi)
  - Tamil: பிடோக் Biṭōk (Transliteration)
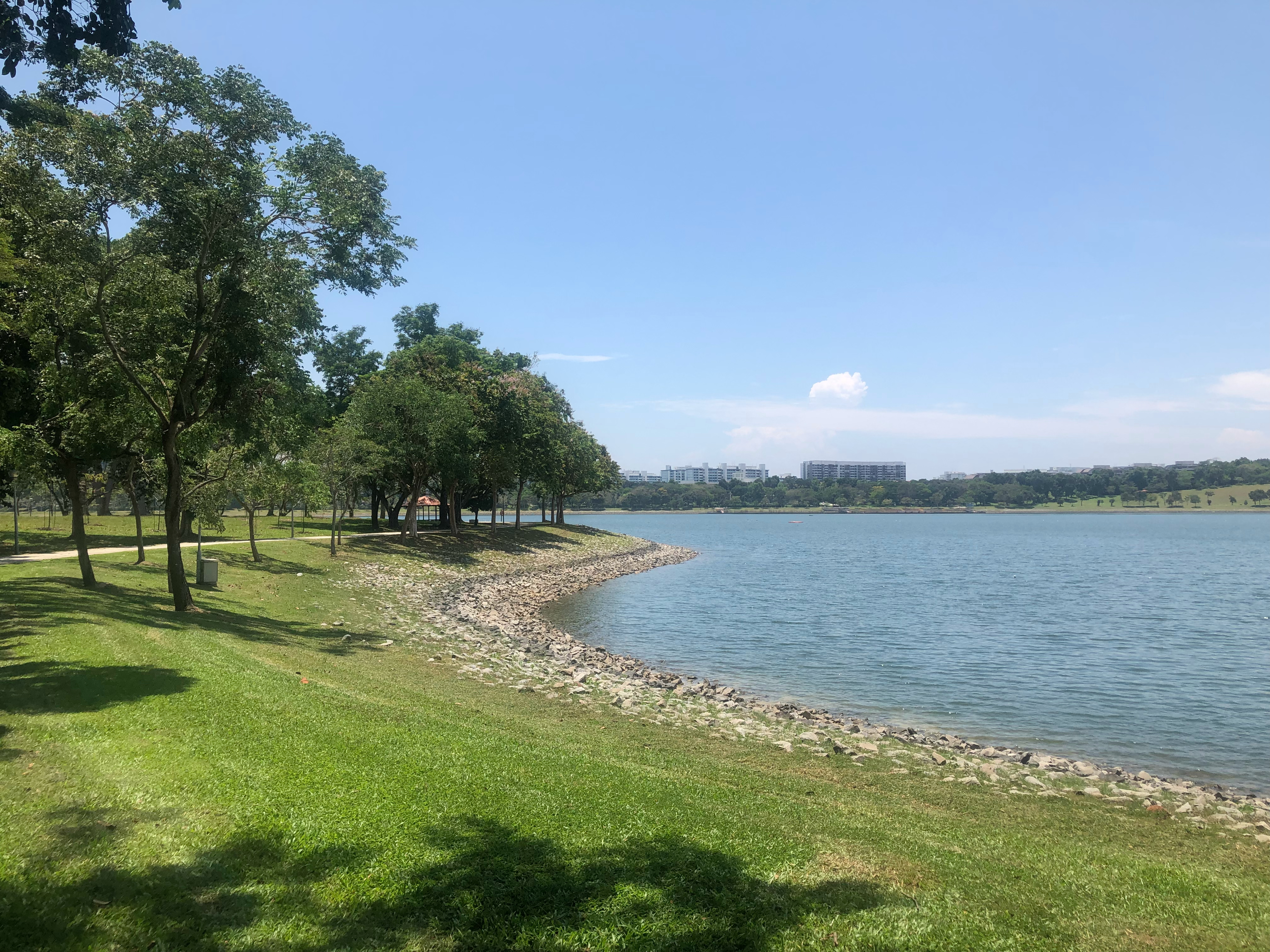
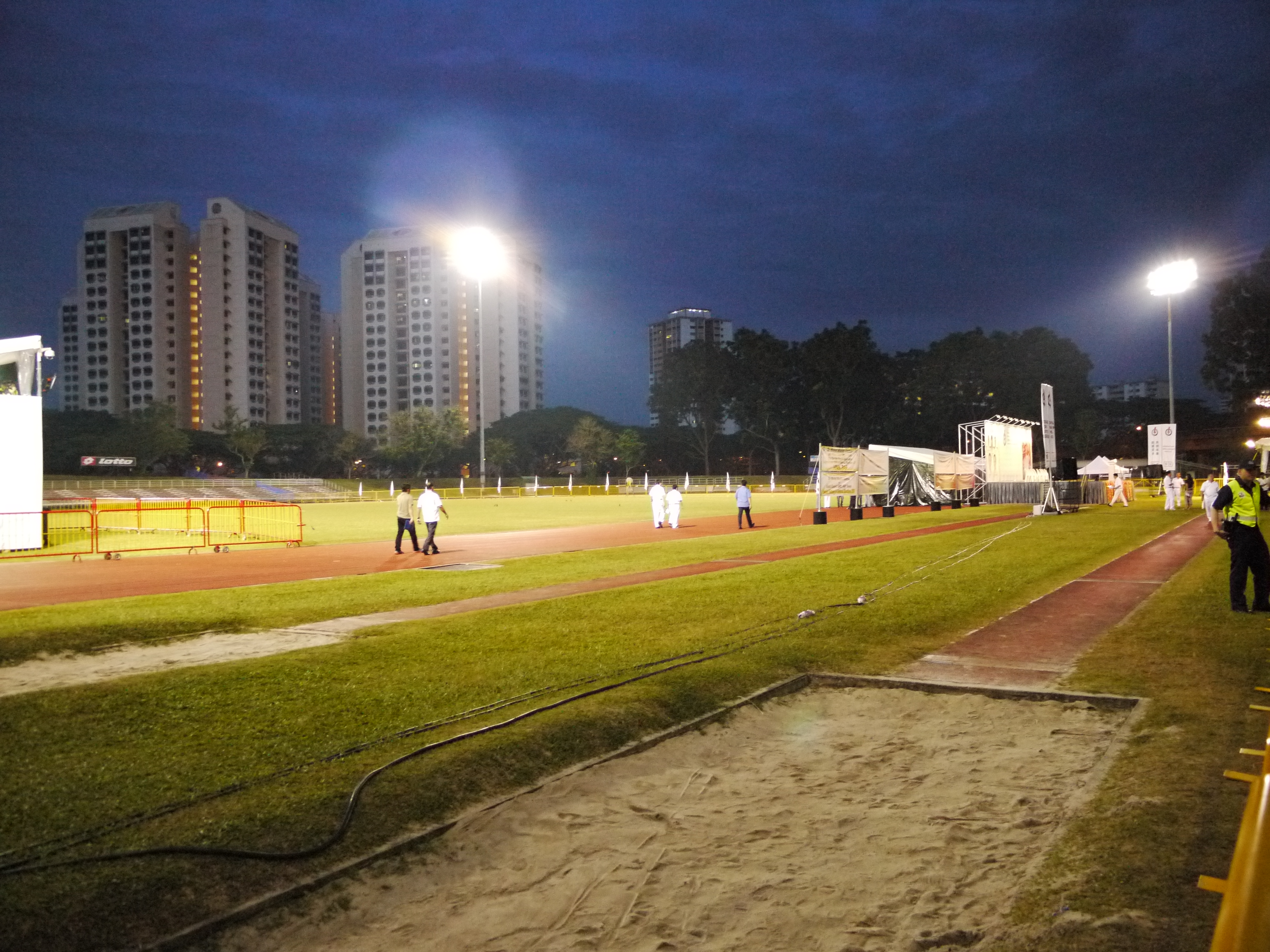
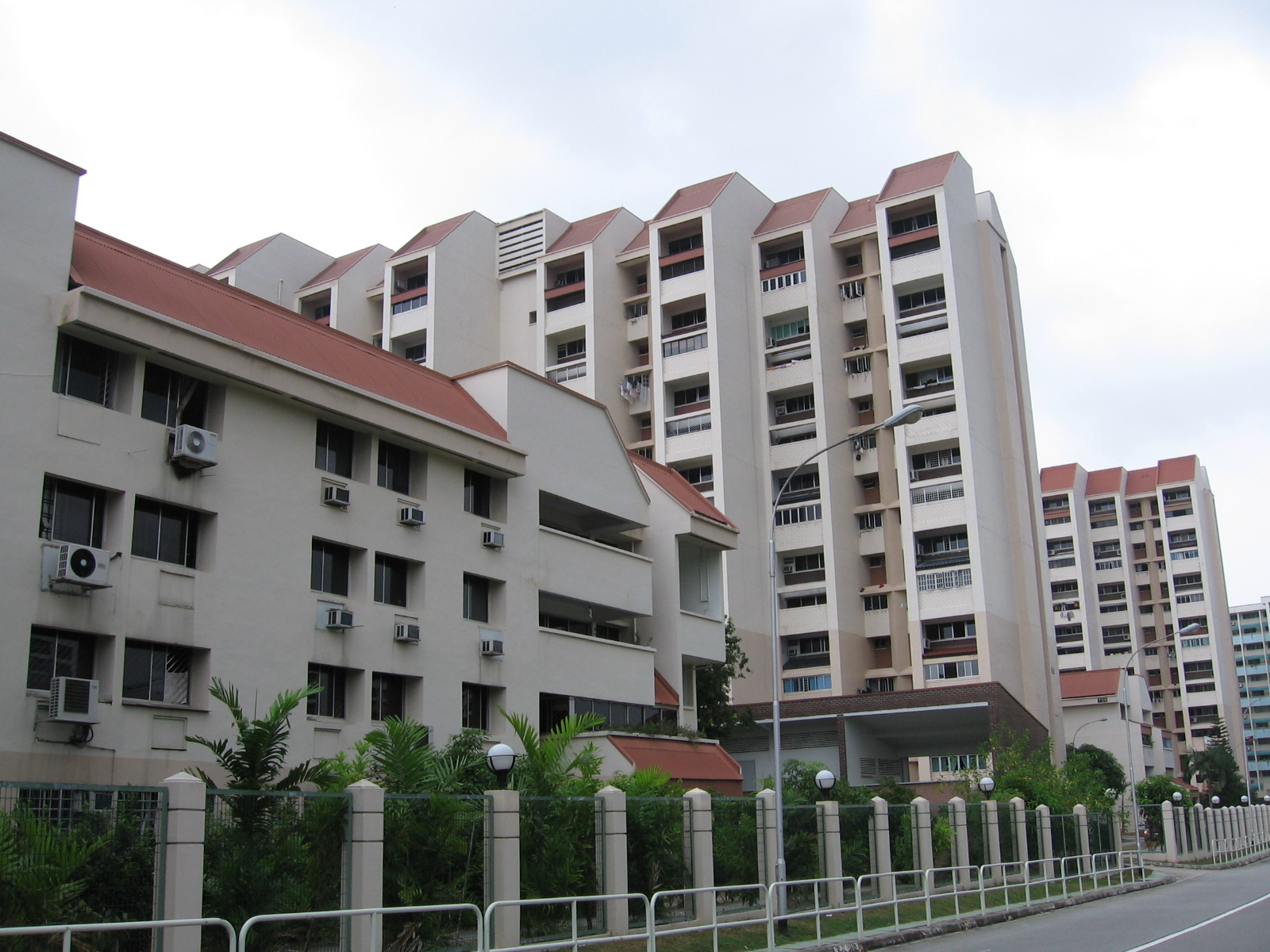
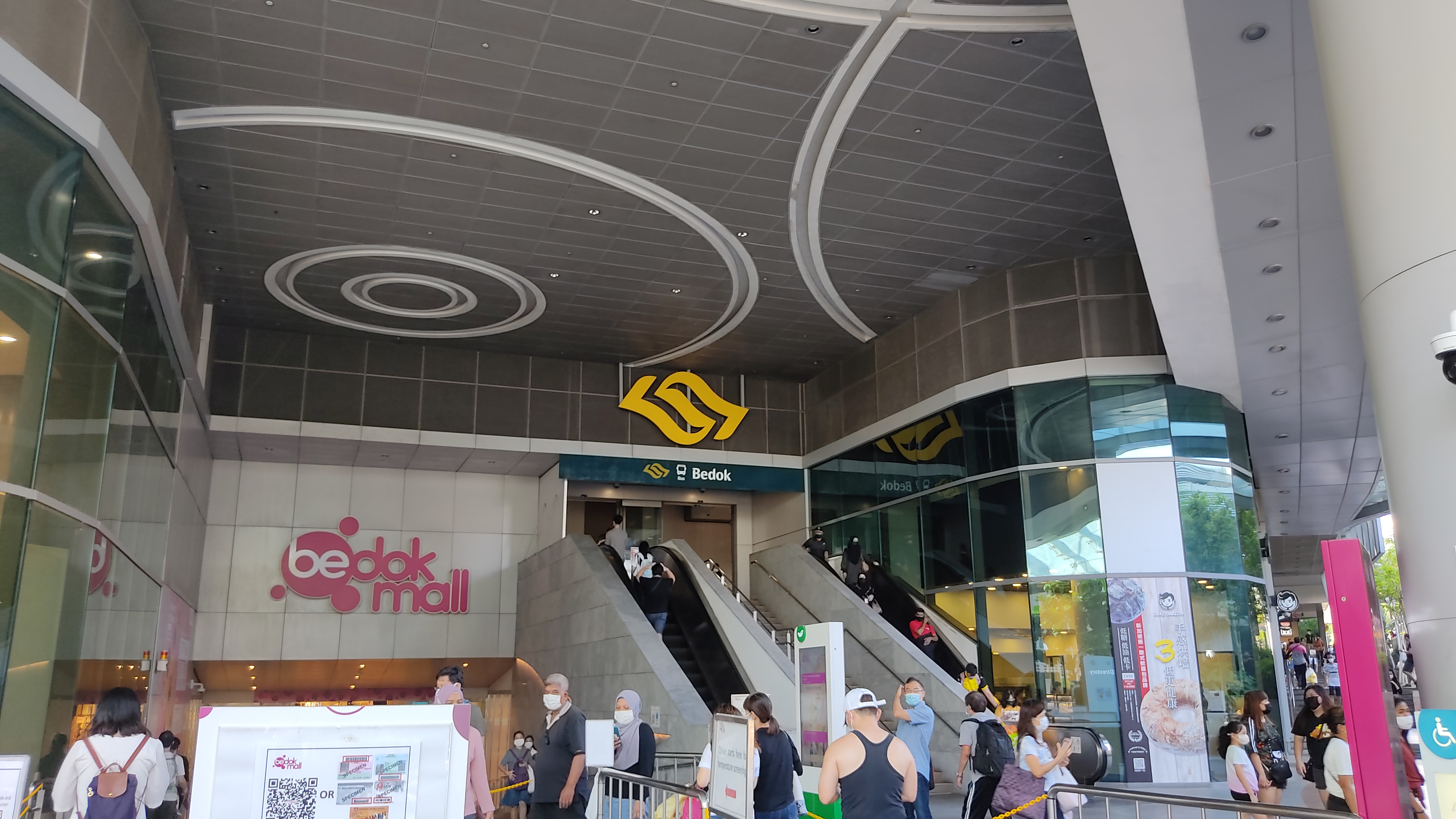
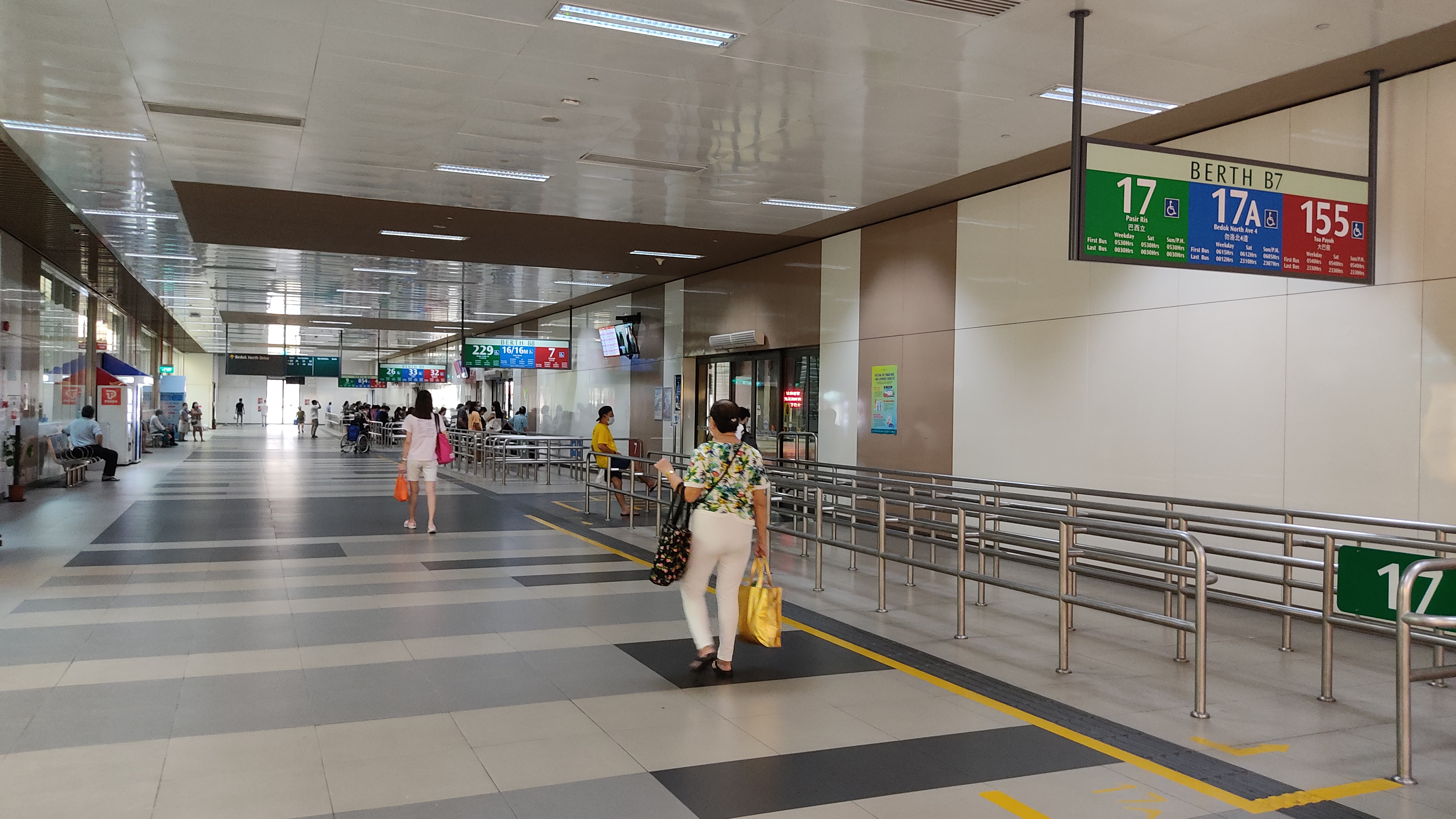
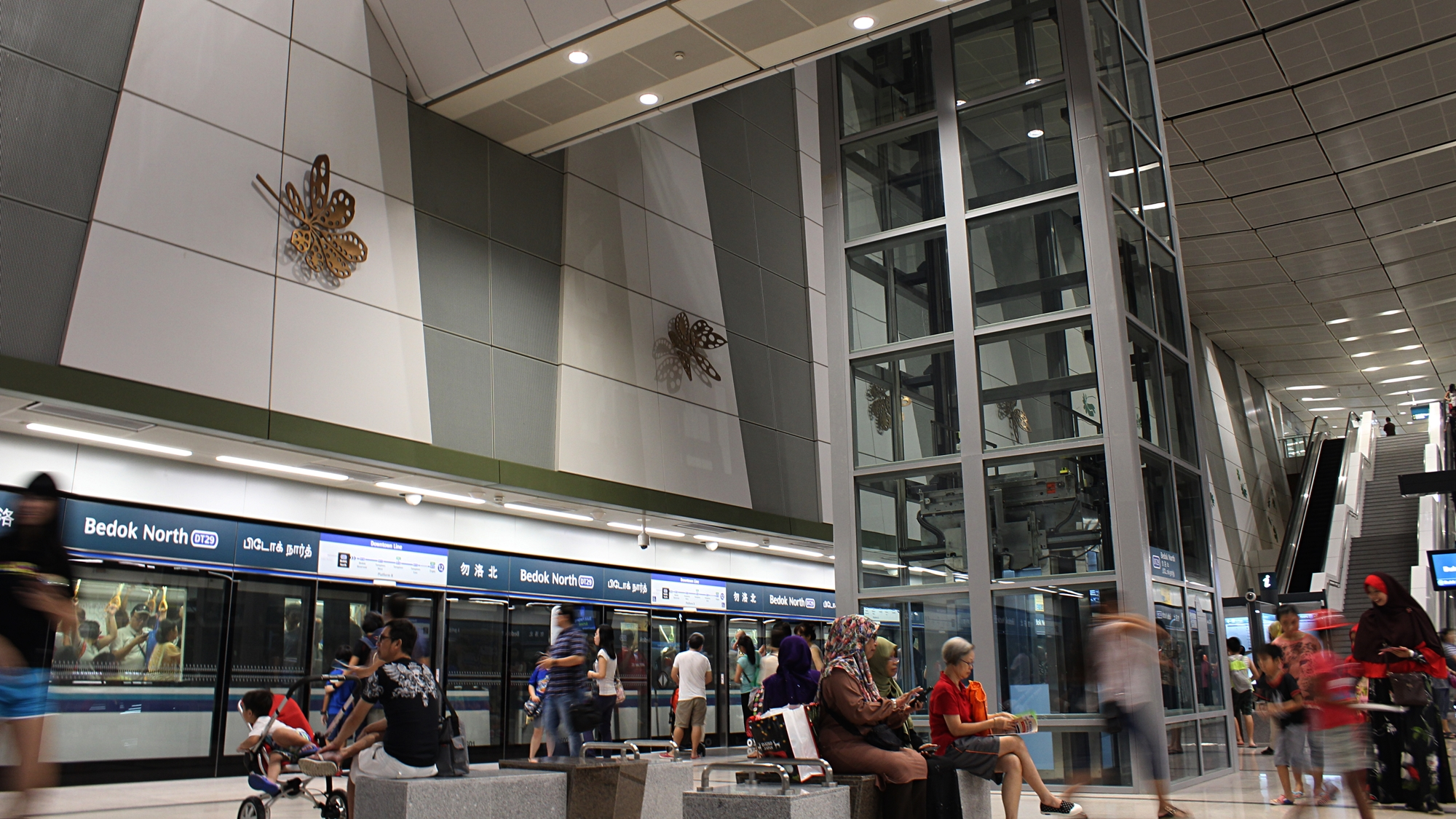
- From top left to right: The shores of Bedok Reservoir, Bedok Stadium, Bedok Reservoir Estate, Bedok Mall, Bedok Bus Interchange, Bedok North MRT station
- Interactive map of Bedok
- Location of Bedok in Singapore
- Coordinates: 1°19′24.96″N 103°55′38.42″E
- Country: Singapore
- Region: East Region
- CDCs: South East
- Town Councils: Aljunied–Hougang; East Coast; Marine Parade–Braddell Heights
- Constituencies: Aljunied GRC; East Coast GRC; Marine Parade–Braddell Heights GRC
- DGP exhibited: 1994
- PA incorporated: 22 January 1999

Government
  - Mayors: South East CDC: Dinesh Vasu Dash
  - Members of Parliament: Aljunied GRC: Gerald Giam; Fadli Fawzi; Pritam Singh; East Coast GRC: Edwin Tong; Dinesh Vasu Dash; Hazlina Abdul Halim; Tan Kiat How; Marine Parade–Braddell Heights GRC: none

Area
  - Total: 21.73 km^{2} (8.39 sq mi)
  - Rank: 7th
  - Residential: 4.18 km^{2} (1.61 sq mi)

Population (2026)
  - Total: 272,120
  - Rank: 2nd
  - Density: 12,520/km^{2} (32,430/sq mi)
  - Rank: 12th

Ethnic groups (2020)
  - Chinese: 201,770 (72.9%)
  - Malays: 39,300 (14.1%)
  - Indians: 24,450 (8.9%)
  - Others: 11,470 (4.1%)
- Postal district: 16
- Dwelling units: 60,115
- Projected ultimate: 79,000

Bedok (IPA: /bəˈdoʊk/ bə-DOHK) is a planning area and residential town located in the geographical region of Tanah Merah along the south-eastern coast of the East Region of Singapore. Bedok is bounded by five other planning areas: Paya Lebar to the north, Hougang to the northwest, Tampines to the northeast and east, Geylang to the west and Marine Parade to the southwest. It also shares a maritime boundary with the Singapore Strait to the south and southeast.

Bedok has a history of evidenced human settlement dating back to the 14th century. The area was originally a fishing village and agriculture centre, but it became a residential and commercial hub with development.

In addition to its commercial development, Bedok has several green spaces and parks, including Bedok Reservoir Park and East Coast Park.

Bedok is the second most populous planning area in the country, being home to 274,360 residents. This high demographic is largely explained by the cheaper public housing in the planning area, due to its relatively distant location from the Central Area (city centre). Besides public housing developments, private residences are also prevalent in the area, most of which are found in the neighbourhoods of Bayshore, Frankel Avenue and Siglap, in western and southwestern Bedok.

== Overview ==
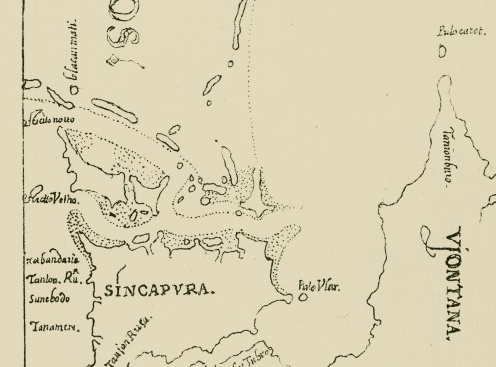
Sungei Bedok (spelt Sune Bodo) marked in this 1604 map of Singapore by Godinho de Erédia. The map is orientated with the South towards the top left.

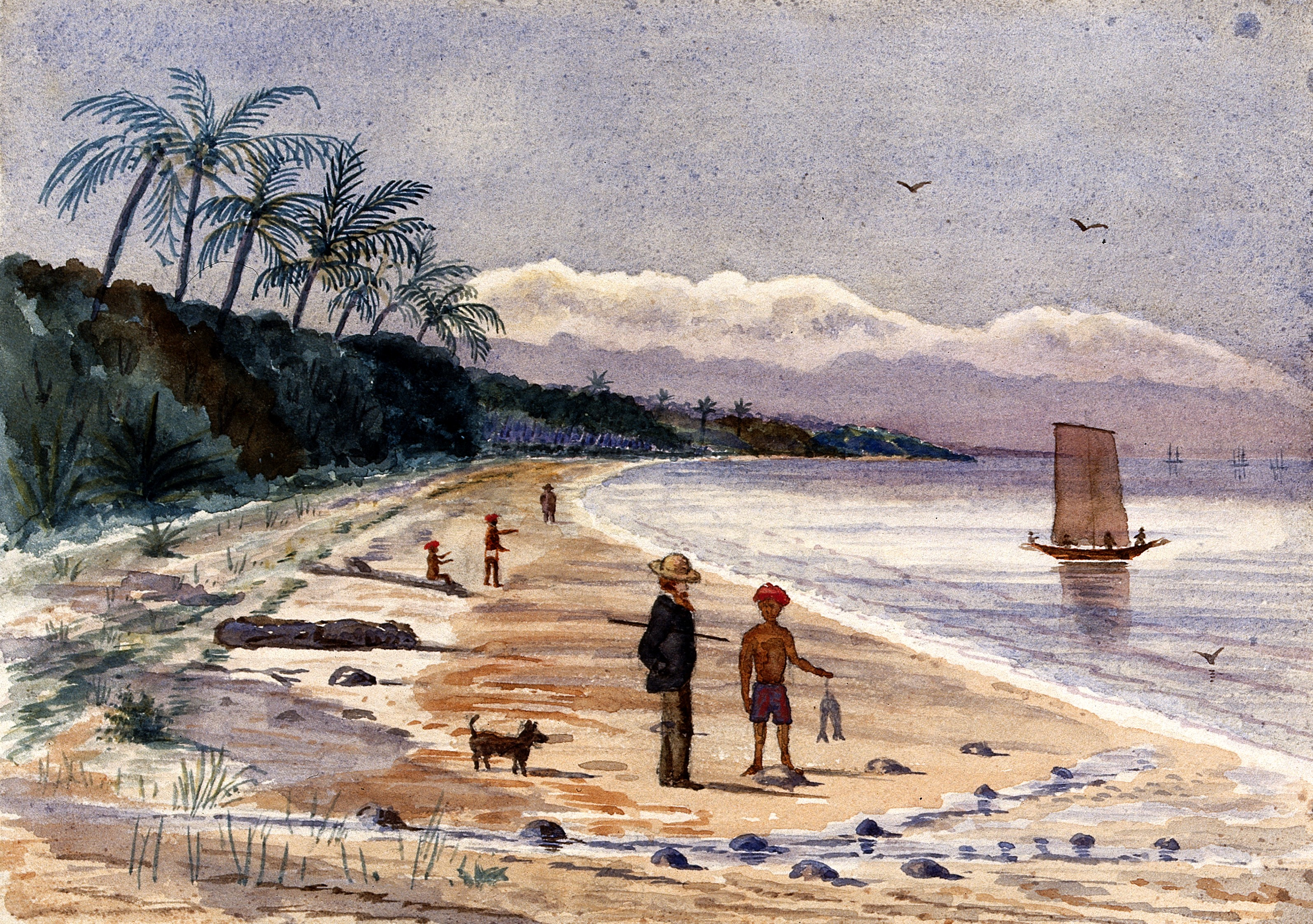
An 1879 watercolour painting of the coast of Siglap by John Edmund Taylor

=== Etymology ===
The origin of the name "Bedok" likely comes from the Malay word for "drum", a reference to the sound of drums heard in the area during traditional festivals and ceremonies. Its use was known as early as 1604 in Manuel Godinho de Erédia's map of Singapore. The map refers to the Bedok River (present-day Sungei Bedok) as Sune Bodo.

=== History ===
As part of the Tanah Merah region, Bedok's history is largely influenced by its coastal frontier. The general area known as Bedok today was first mentioned in maps dating to the pre-Raffles era. After Singapore was colonised by the British in 1819, Simpang Bedok became an ethnically mixed community consisting of Chinese and Malay peoples. Before the 1960s, Bedok's primary source of income was coconut, which was harvested from the plantations found in the Siglap subzone. Fishing was another primary source of income for the villagers of Simpang Bedok at the time.

The modern development of Bedok began in 1966, when reclamation works along the coastal area began. In the following decade, Bedok was transformed by the Housing and Development Board (HDB) into the country's fifth self-contained new town, with the first residential flats emerging in the vicinity by 1975. Following the Fall of Saigon that same year, Bedok Jetty became a focal point for Vietnamese refugees landing in Singapore during Operation Thunderstorm.

Bedok Town has been developed since 1973, with newer roads such as Bedok Plain, Bedok Highway, and Bedok Heights being built until 1975. New Upper Changi Road was fully built and opened in 1979. Development was completed at that time, except for Bedok Reservoir and Kaki Bukit, which were developed later between 1983 and 1988.

== Geography ==
=== Location ===
Bedok Planning Area is located within the East Region of Singapore, along the southeastern coast of Singapore Island. It is bounded by Paya Lebar to the north, Hougang to the northwest, Tampines to the northeast and east, Geylang to the west, and Marine Parade to the southwest.

Bedok New Town sits within the Bedok Planning Area.

=== Subzones ===
Bedok is divided into 8 subzones:

Name of estates	Location	Notable structures	Accessibility
Bayshore	Areas along Bayshore Road	East Coast Park, Upper East Coast Bus Terminal, Bedok Jetty, Temasek Secondary School as well as the Bayshore MRT station, Bedok South MRT station (U/C) and Sungei Bedok MRT station (U/C)	Bayshore MRT station and buses
Bedok North	Areas along Bedok North Road	Tanah Merah MRT station, Bedok MRT station, Bedok Bus Interchange, Bedok Town Centre, Bedok Stadium, Bedok Swimming Complex, Bedok Tennis Centre, Bedok Sports Hall, Bedok Mall, Bedok Point, Bedok Public Library, Bedok Polyclinic, Seu Teck Sean Tong Yiang Sin Sia, Kampong Chai Chee Community Centre, Fengshan Community Club, Fengshan Primary School, St Anthony's Canossian Primary & Secondary School	Tanah Merah MRT station, Bedok MRT station and buses
Bedok Reservoir	Areas surrounding Bedok Reservoir	Bedok Town Park, Bedok Reservoir, Bedok Reservoir Park, Damai Primary School, Damai Secondary School and Bedok Reservoir MRT station	Buses and Bedok Reservoir MRT station
Bedok South	Estates along Bedok South Road	Bedok Community Centre, Bedok Green Primary School, Bedok View Secondary School, Bedok South Secondary School, Temasek Primary School, Temasek Junior College and Yuan Meng Shih Temple	Bedok MRT station, Tanah Merah MRT station, and buses
Frankel	Areas along Telok Kurau Road and Siglap Road	Telok Kurau Park, Opera Estate Primary School, CHIJ (Katong) Primary School, Saint Patrick's School, 124 and 126/126A St. Patrick's Road	Kembangan MRT station, Marine Terrace MRT station and buses
Kaki Bukit	Northwest Bedok	Kaki Bukit Industrial Estate, Eunos Community Club, Kaki Bukit MRT station and Bedok North MRT station	Buses, Kaki Bukit MRT station and Bedok North MRT station
Kembangan	Areas around Kembangan MRT station and Chai Chee Estate	Kembangan MRT station, Kampong Kembangan Community Club, The Buddhist Union, Hong San Si Temple, Kampong Kembangan Neighbourhood Police Post, Chai Chee Neighbourhood Police Post, Chai Chee Fire Post, Bedok South Neighbourhood Police Centre, Chai Chee United Temple, NPS International School and Ping Yi Secondary School	Kembangan MRT station and buses
Siglap	Areas along Marine Vista and Siglap Link	East Coast Park, Victoria School, Victoria Junior College, Ean Keng Si Buddhist Temple and the Siglap MRT station	Siglap MRT station and buses

== Infrastructure ==
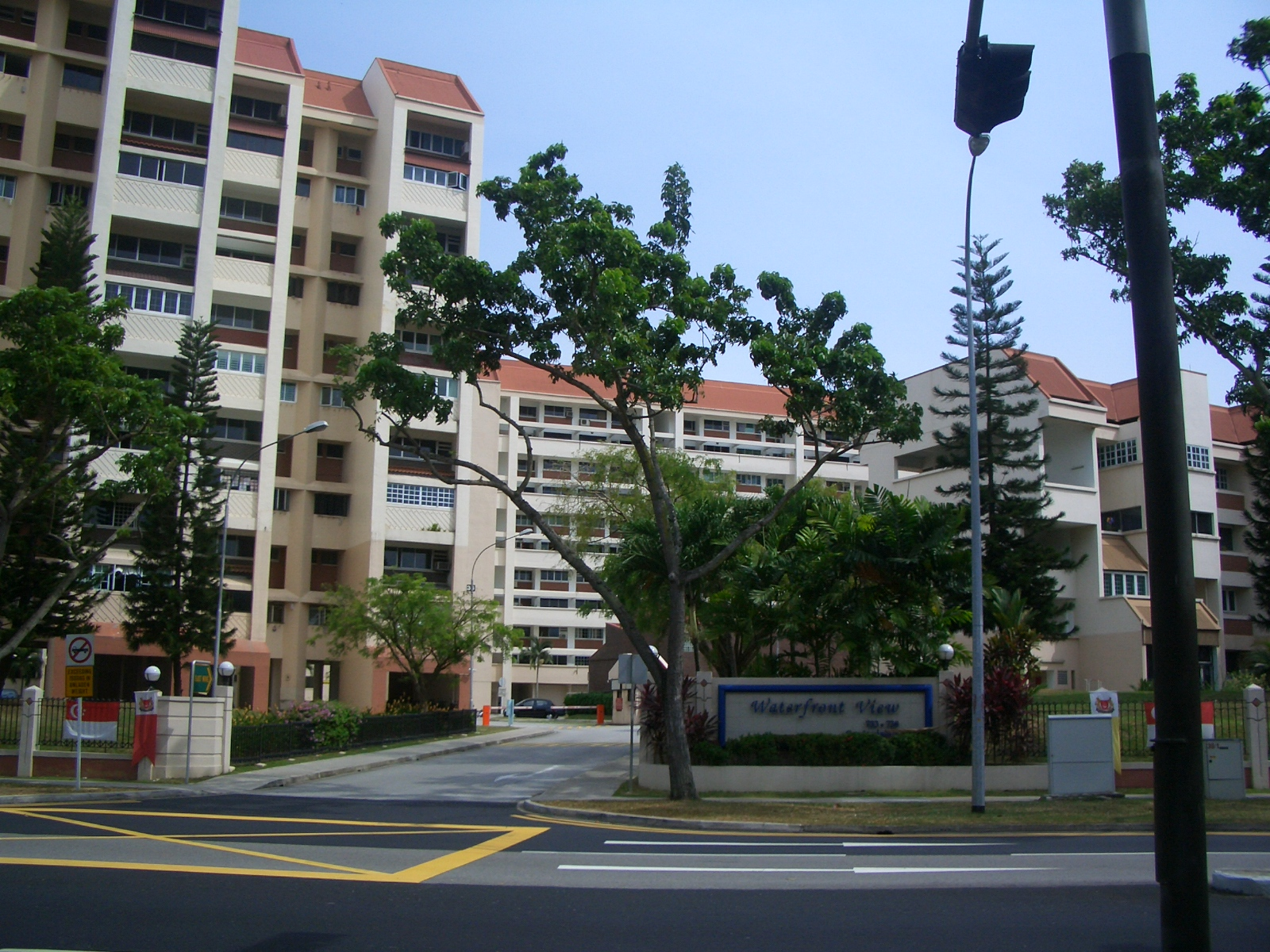
A former housing estate opposite Bedok Reservoir

Bedok New Town covers a land area close to 9.4 km^{2} (3.6 sq mi) with some 42% occupied for residential use. It was formerly a hilly region, and hence the focal point of orientation of the town is the special landscaped park and sports complex built on the higher ground of the town. The residential blocks, as well as the industrial area, are planned based on the neighbourhood concept. There is also a town centre situated between the present Bedok Mall and the former Bedok Point site. Plans for an integrated complex the size of three football fields were revealed in 2014. This complex, Heartbeat @ Bedok, houses a sports centre, library, clinic, centre for the elderly, and the Kampong Chai Chee Community Club. The complex is located in the Bedok Town centre and was completed in 2017. Bedok also has a lighthouse that is located on top of a residential building.

=== Residential development ===
Some 58,000 units of flats were built by the HDB in Bedok New Town. As one of the older towns, the majority of the flats are 3-room or 4-room. There are also some 2,700 and 583 units of executive and Housing and Urban Development Corporation flats. It provides housing for some 200,000 residents.

=== Transportation ===
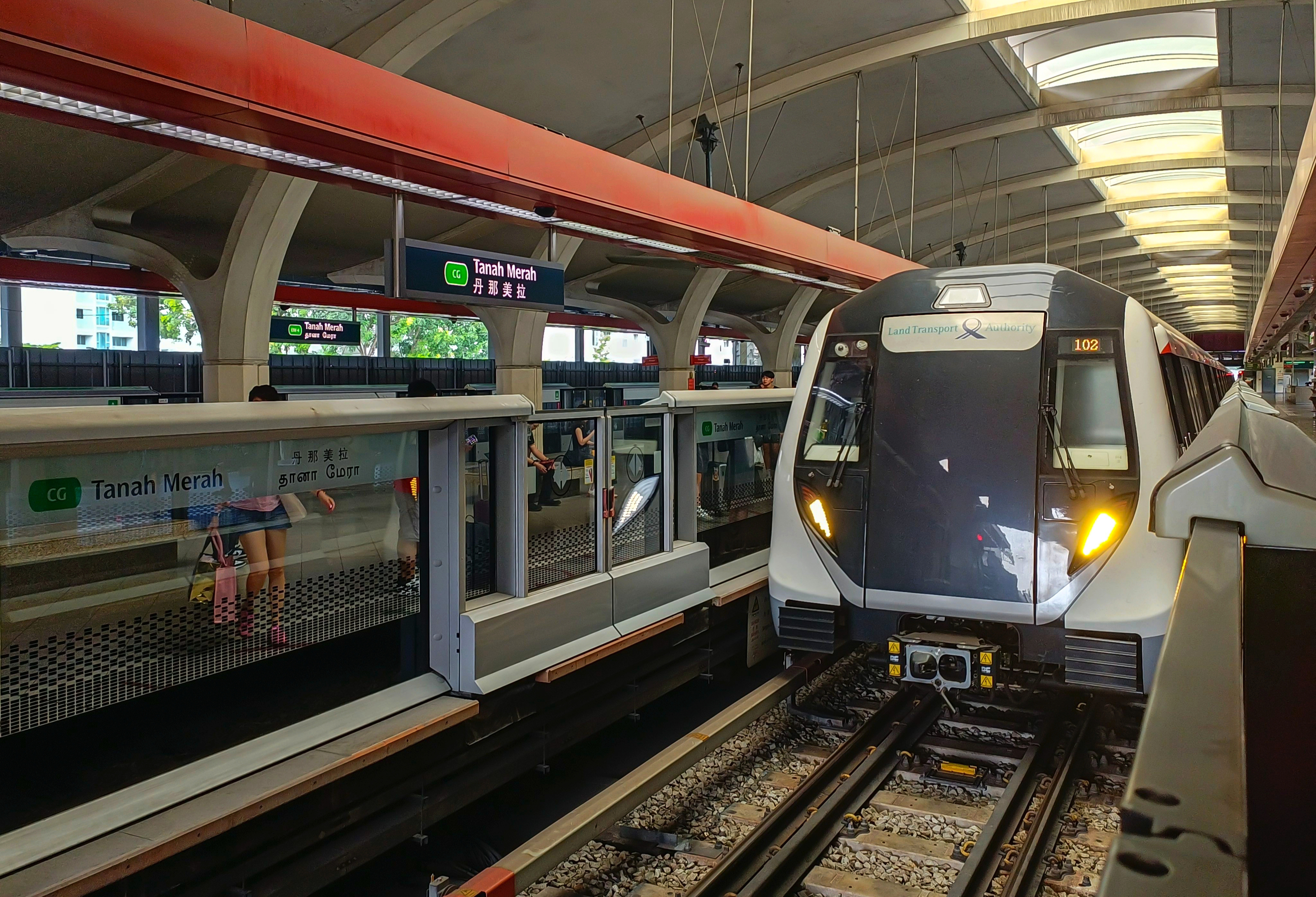
Tanah Merah station

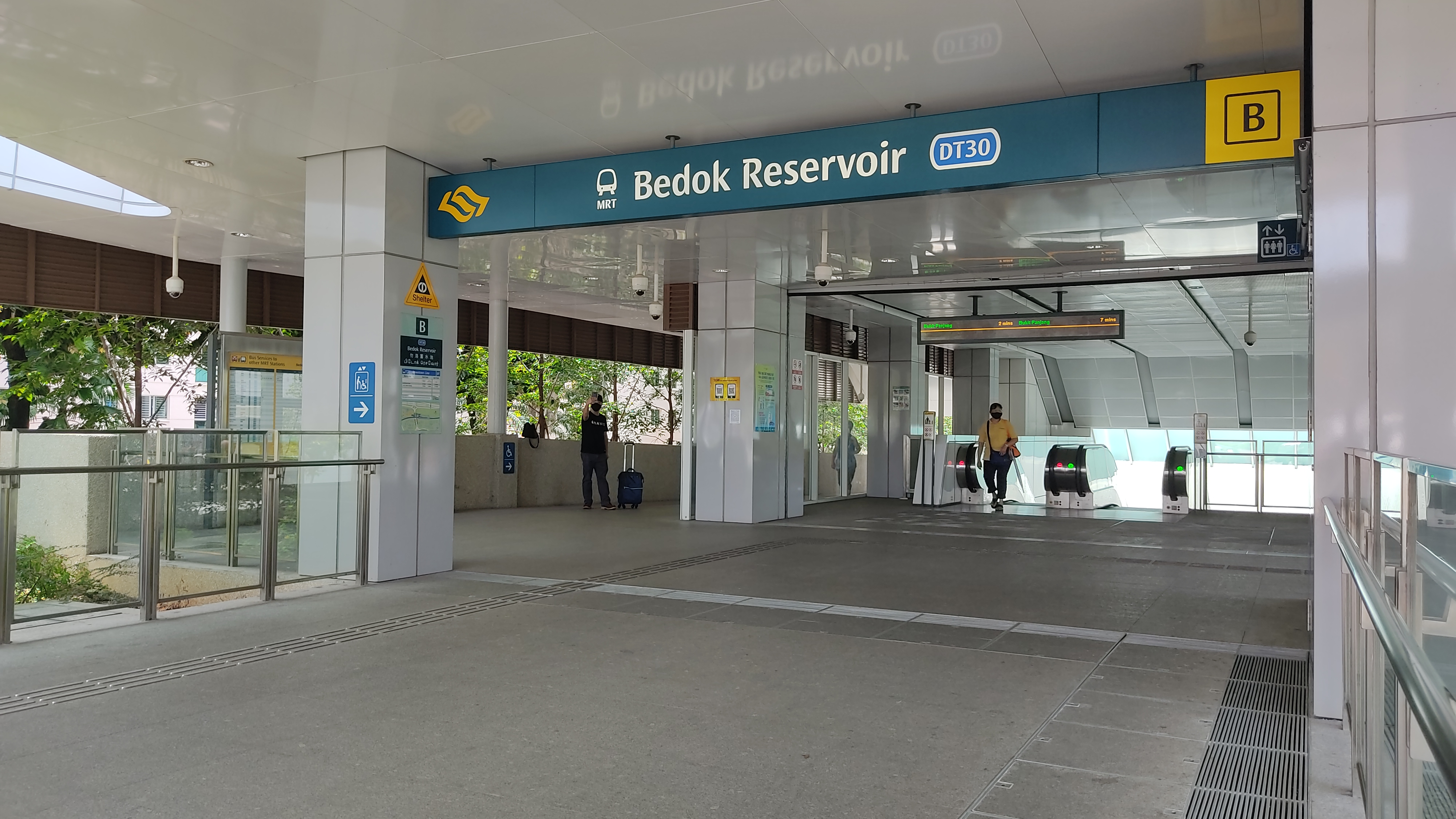
Bedok Reservoir station

There are eleven Mass Rapid Transit (MRT) stations in Bedok across three lines: the East–West Line (EWL), the Downtown Line (DTL), and the Thomson–East Coast Line (TEL). These lines run parallel to one another through the northern, central, and southern parts of the planning area, and they do not have an interchange station at Bedok station itself. However, Tanah Merah station serves as an interchange for a branch line to Changi Airport station, which is slated for a takeover by the TEL in the 2030s. In the interim, Sungei Bedok station will function as the terminus for both the DTL and the TEL when it opens by the end of 2026. The eleven stations are:

- EW4 CG Tanah Merah
- EW5 Bedok
- EW6 Kembangan
- DT28 Kaki Bukit
- DT29 Bedok North
- DT30 Bedok Reservoir
- TE27 Marine Terrace
- TE28 Siglap
- TE29 Bayshore
- TE30 Bedok South (from 2H 2026)
- TE31 DT37 Sungei Bedok (from 2H 2026)

The Bedok Bus Interchange opened in 1979, as part of the Bedok Town Centre, located along Bedok North Road and between Block 203 and 207, next to community amenities such as a food centre, library, and sports complex, with the allocated Block 207A. There were thirty-three end-on berths with ten services occupying it and six sawtooth berths, each occupying three bus services in the original facility. Several bus services were moved to the interchange from Chai Chee Bus Terminal when it closed in 1985. Bedok MRT station opened in 1989 at the south of the original facility, complementing the bus interchange to serve people travelling within Bedok town and also the nearby East Coast Park.

On 19 November 2011, after operating from the original facility for 32 years, the bus interchange moved to its temporary facility west of the original facility, at the junction of Bedok North Drive and Bedok North Avenue 1, to allow the original facility to be redeveloped into Bedok Mall. The Bedok Integrated Transport Hub (ITH) began operations on 30 November 2014. It is the 7th air-conditioned bus interchange in Singapore.

=== Parks ===
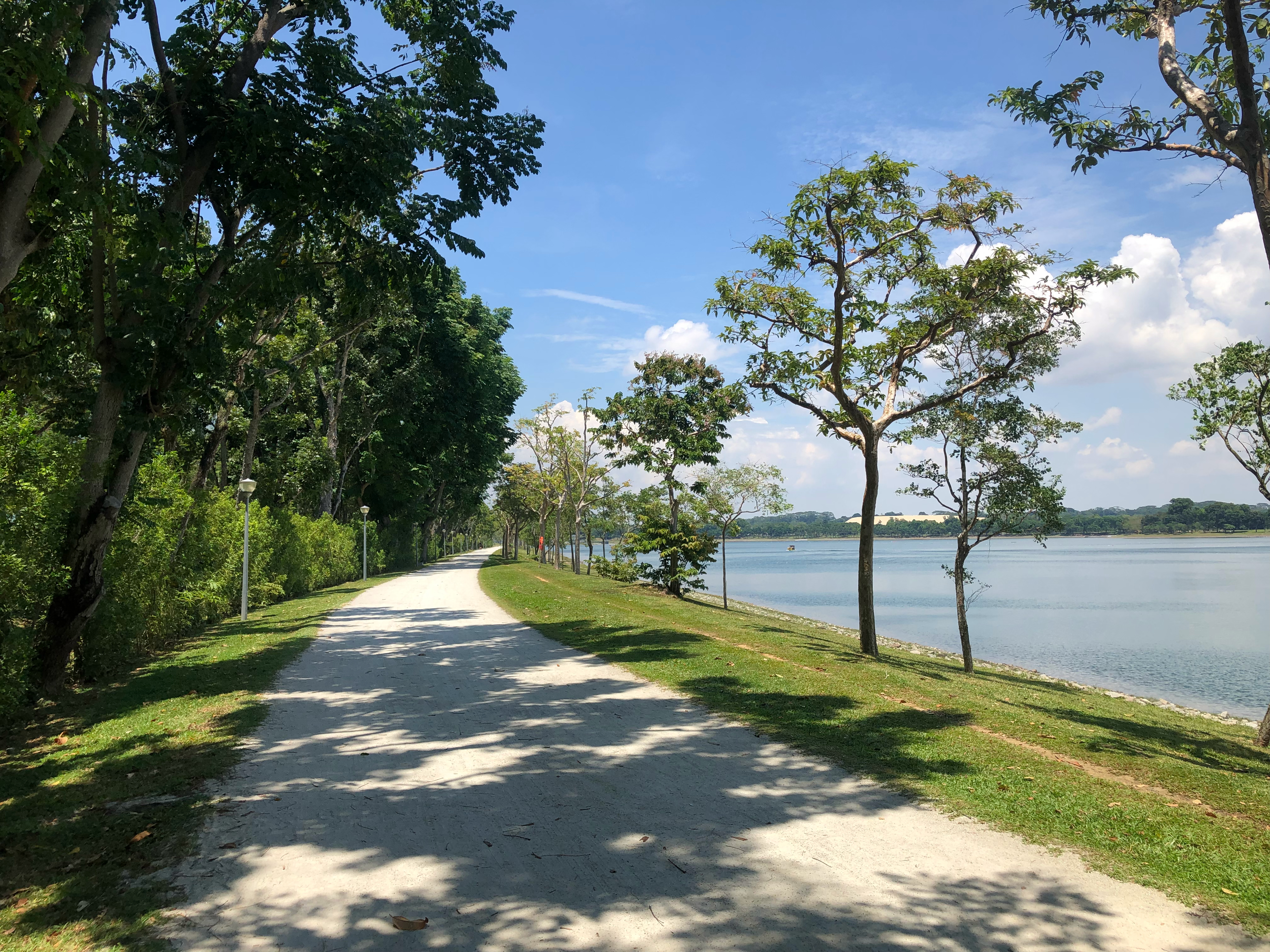
Path at Bedok Reservoir

The parks in the area include Bedok Town Park, located beside the Pan Island Expressway between Bedok North Road and Bedok North Avenue 3, and the Bedok Reservoir Park alongside Bedok Reservoir. Bedok Town Park has been designated with the code 9V-0005 by the international Parks On The Air award program, and so is regularly 'activated' by Amateur radio operators using portable equipment.

== Politics ==
In early days, Bedok has been heavily organized into several constituencies over the years, and by 1976, a namesake Bedok Constituency was carved from Siglap Constituency with Sha'ari Tadin being the first MP for the area. Towards the end of 1980s as its population grew rapidly and with the introduction of the Group Representation Constituency (GRC) scheme, the electoral boundaries were redrawn to include the namesake GRC while other constituencies of the planning area were organized into GRCs of Aljunied GRC, Eunos, Marine Parade and Tampines while retaining other constituencies such as Joo Chiat and Fengshan. In 1997, Bedok GRC become the present-day East Coast GRC following the addition of Changi (until 2025 with the creation of Pasir Ris-Changi GRC) in the recent redistricting of constituencies, along with most of other Bedok constituencies. As of 2025, Bedok has been represented under three different constituencies: Aljunied GRC (northern Bedok along with Kaki Bukit and Bedok Reservoir), East Coast GRC (divisions covering most of Bedok, Joo Chiat, Siglap and Bayshore), and Marine Parade-Braddell Heights GRC (Frankel and Kembangan divisions).

Since 1988, the Workers' Party had frequently contest there in the areas of Bedok including the aforementioned GRCs. Their first victory was in the 2011 election when WP won Aljunied GRC, capturing the northern areas of Bedok under the flagship of then-secretary general Low Thia Khiang, who took charge of the Bedok Reservoir-Punggol division, and its present secretary-general Pritam Singh, who took charge of the Eunos division. Despite this, PAP had still retained the other constituencies albeit only by narrow margins.

The areas of Bedok has also been under charge by many prominent ministers including Maliki Osman, Lee Yock Suan, Raymond Lim and Lim Swee Say, former Senior Minister S. Jayakumar, previous speakers Tan Soo Khoon and Abdullah Tarmugi, and Deputy Prime Minister Heng Swee Keat. As of 2025, East Coast was led by minister Edwin Tong and other four MPs Jessica Tan Soon Neo, Tan Kiat How, Dinesh Vasu Dash and Hazlina Abdul Halim, while Marine Parade-Braddell Heights was overseen by Muhammad Faishal Ibrahim, who returned to that GRC (then as Marine Parade GRC back in 2006) after representing Nee Soon GRC from 2011 to 2025, until his sudden resignation on 20 July 2026.

== Education ==
The following is the list of schools in Bedok as of 2024:

=== Primary schools ===
- Bedok Green Primary School
- Damai Primary School (to be relocated to Tampines in 2029)
- Fengshan Primary School
- Opera Estate Primary School
- Red Swastika School
- St. Anthony's Canossian Primary School
- St. Stephen's School
- Telok Kurau Primary School
- Temasek Primary School
- Yu Neng Primary School

=== Secondary schools ===
- Anglican High School
- Bedok Green Secondary School
- Bedok South Secondary School
- Bedok View Secondary School
- Damai Secondary School
- St. Anthony's Canossian Secondary School
- Temasek Secondary School

=== Junior colleges ===
- Temasek Junior College (as of 2024, the campus has been temporarily relocated to Tampines whilst the Bedok campus is undergoing renovations)

=== Other schools ===
- Katong School (APSN)
- NPS International School

== Hawker centres ==
As of 2020, 10 major hawker centres are located in Bedok that serves local Singaporean cuisine. They are:

- Fengshan Market & Food Centre
- Bedok Interchange Hawker Centre
- Blk 216 Bedok Food Centre & Market
- Kaki Bukit 511 Market & Food Centre
- Bedok 538 Market & Food Centre
- Blk 16 Bedok South Market & Food Centre
- The Marketplace @ 58
- Bedok Food Centre
- The Bedok Market Place
- Blk 630 Bedok Reservoir Market & Food Centre

== In popular culture ==
The popular blockbuster Singaporean drama known as It Takes Two was filmed around the area and that the protagonists and their family are all living together in the HDB Flats as neighbours under one roof and that Blk 216 Bedok Market and Hawker Centre was also another filming location for the drama as well, where both of the protagonist's families sell handmade fishball noodles at their respective stalls.
