= Queenstown Constituency =

Former Singaporean constituency

Coordinates: 1.303°N 103.802°E

Queenstown
- Former constituency
- Region: Central Region, Singapore
- Electorate: 18,084

Former constituency
- Created: 1955
- Abolished: 1988
- Seats: 1
- Party: Barisan Sosialis (1959–1963); Labour Front (1955–1959); People's Action Party (1959, 1963–1984)
- Member: 1
- Replaced by: Brickworks Group Representation Constituency

Queenstown Constituency was a constituency in Singapore. It existed from 1955 to 1988.

== History ==
Queenstown Constituency was established prior to the 1955 general election in colonial Singapore. Lee Choon Eng from the Labour Front (LF) defeated candidates from the Democratic Party (DP) and Progressive Party (PP) with 67.28% of the vote.

During the 1959 general election, Lee Siew Choh, candidate for the now-dominant People's Action Party (PAP), won the constituency with 53.81% of the vote, consistent with the party's initial rise to power where it won 43 out of 51 seats in the Legislative Assembly. However, he would leave the PAP in 1961, after it expelled its left-wing faction, to become a member of Barisan Sosialis (BS), a new party started by members of the faction.

In the 1963 general election, Lee Siew Choh did not run for Queenstown; Jek Yeun Thong reclaimed it for the PAP, defeating Lee Ek Chong from BS and two other candidates with 52.81% of the vote. He would retain the constituency, both unopposed and against different opposition candidates, until the 1988 general election, after Singapore had become independent and the Legislative Assembly had been replaced with the Parliament of Singapore.

In 1988, the constituency was merged into Brickworks Group Representation Constituency (GRC) following the establishment of GRCs. All constituencies represented by a single MP were renamed single-member constituencies (SMCs).

== Members of Parliament ==
Election	Member	Party
Formation
1955	Lee Choon Eng	LF
1959	Lee Siew Choh	PAP
1959	Lee Siew Choh	BS
1963	Jek Yeun Thong	PAP
Parliament of Singapore
1968	Jek Yeun Thong	PAP
1972	Jek Yeun Thong	PAP
1976	Jek Yeun Thong	PAP
1980	Jek Yeun Thong	PAP
1984	Jek Yeun Thong	PAP
Constituency abolished (1988)

== Electoral results ==
Note: The Elections Department does not include rejected votes when calculating the vote shares of candidates. Hence, all candidates' vote shares will total to 100% at any given election (may not appear so in multi-way contests due to rounding).

=== Elections in 1950s ===
General Election 1955
Party	Candidate	Votes	%
LF	Lee Choon Eng	2,792	67.28
DP	Murray Brash	736	17.73
PP	Elizabeth Choy	622	14.99
Majority		2,056	49.55
Total valid votes		4,150	98.79
Rejected ballots		51	1.21
Turnout		4,201	59.89
Registered electors		7,015	
LF win (new seat)			

General Election 1959
Party	Candidate	Votes	%	±%
PAP	Lee Siew Choh	5,301	53.81	N/A
SPA	Chee Phui Hung	3,732	37.88	N/A
Independent	Lee Kim Chuan	818	8.31	N/A
Majority		1,569	15.93	▼33.62
Total valid votes		9,851	99.09	▲0.30
Rejected ballots		90	0.91	▼0.30
Turnout		9,941	93.48	▲33.59
Registered electors		10,634		▲51.59
PAP gain from LF		Swing	N/A	

=== Elections in 1960s ===
General Election 1963
Party	Candidate	Votes	%	±%
PAP	Jek Yeun Thong	8,165	52.81	▼1.00
BS	Lee Ek Chong	5,589	36.15	N/A
UPP	Ng Ho	909	5.88	N/A
SA	Lee Khee Loong	798	5.16	N/A
Majority		2,576	16.66	▲0.73
Total valid votes		15,461	99.19	▲0.10
Rejected ballots		127	0.81	▼0.10
Turnout		15,588	96.62	▲3.14
Registered electors		16,133		▲51.59
PAP gain from BS		Swing	▼1.00	

General Election 1968
Party	Candidate	Votes	%	±%
PAP	Jek Yeun Thong	Unopposed		
Registered electors		16,193		▲0.37
PAP hold				

=== Elections in 1970s ===
General Election 1972
Party	Candidate	Votes	%	±%
PAP	Jek Yeun Thong	14,200	81.24	N/A
WP	Chua Eng Huat	2,504	14.33	N/A
UNF	Lew Ban Huat	775	4.43	N/A
Majority		11,696	66.91	N/A
Total valid votes		17,479	98.74	N/A
Rejected ballots		223	1.26	N/A
Turnout		17,702	95.90	N/A
Registered electors		18,458		▲4.27
PAP hold		Swing	N/A	

General Election 1976
Party	Candidate	Votes	%	±%
PAP	Jek Yeun Thong	Unopposed		
Registered electors		16,926		▼9.05
PAP hold				

=== Elections in 1980s ===
General Election 1980
Party	Candidate	Votes	%	±%
PAP	Jek Yeun Thong	Unopposed		
Registered electors		17,450		▲3.10
PAP hold				

General Election 1984
Party	Candidate	Votes	%	±%
PAP	Jek Yeun Thong	Unopposed		
Registered electors		18,084		▲3.63
PAP hold				

== Historical maps ==
1955 General Election
