= Sidek Saniff =

Former Singaporean politician and activist

Sidek Saniff DUBC
- صديق صانف

Member of Parliament for Aljunied GRC
- In office 2 January 1997 – 18 October 2001
- Preceded by: Constituency established

Member of Parliament for Jalan Besar GRC
- In office 17 August 1988 – 2 January 1997
- Preceded by: Constituency established

Member of Parliament for Kolam Ayer Constituency
- In office 23 December 1976 – 17 August 1988
- Preceded by: Constituency established
- Succeeded by: Constituency abolished

Personal details
- Born: April 18, 1938 (age 88)
- Profession: Politician, teacher, activist

Sidek bin Saniff (Note: Jawi: صديق بن صانف) (born 18 April 1938) is a former Singaporean politician and activist. A member of the People's Action Party (PAP), Sidek was a Member of Parliament of Aljunied Group Representation Constituency (GRC) from 1997 to 2001.

He was Parliamentary Ministry of Communications and Information and Second Parliamentary Secretary, Ministry of Culture from 1980 to 1981, Parliamentary Secretary, Ministry of Social Affairs from 1981 to 1984 and Parliamentary Secretary, Ministry of Trade and Industry from 1981 to 1988. He also served as Senior Parliamentary Secretary, Ministry of Education from 1988 to 1991, Minister of State for Ministry of Education from 1991 to 1995, Senior Minister of State, Ministry of Education from 1996 to 1997 and Senior Minister of State, Ministry of the Environment from 1997 to 2001.

Sidek was involved in politics for 25 years before retiring in 2001. He was instrumental in the formation of MENDAKI, a self-help group for the Malay community in Singapore.

== Early life ==
Sidek was the second child of 13 children. He became a Malay language teacher and an activist for the increased recognition of the Malay language in schools in Singapore. As an activist, Sidek organised a demonstration outside the Ministry of Education for better salaries for Malay language teachers in the 1960s.

Sidek was a teacher at now-defunct Maju Secondary School between 1968 and 1976. He was also the President of the Singapore Malay Teachers' Union between 1970 and 1976.

== Political career ==
In 1976, Prime Minister Lee Kuan Yew invited Sidek to join the People's Action Party and contest as a candidate in 1976 general election. Sidek stood for election in Kolam Ayer Constituency and won against United Front's Chetty Rajah with 72.5% of the votes. Sidek was the Parliamentary Secretary for Communications and Second Parliamentary Secretary for Culture for a short period before the 1980 elections.

In the 1980 general election, Sidek stood for election against another United Front candidate, Mohamed Monsor Rahman, and won 80.35% of the votes. In the 1984 general election, Sidek faced Royston George Scharenguivel from the Workers' Party. Sidek won 57.91% of the votes, a significant drop from his previous two election results.

In 1988, the GRC system was established, resulting in Kolam Ayer Constituency being merged into Eunos GRC. Sidek joined the PAP's team to contest Jalan Besar GRC and won 62.68% of the vote against candidates from the Workers' Party. In 1991, Sidek joined the PAP team for Eunos GRC, switching places with Zulkifli Mohammed. The PAP team narrowly won the election with 52.38% of the votes cast against the WP team led by Lee Siew Choh. Lee's team had narrowly lost in the same GRC during the previous election in 1988. Following the redrawing of boundaries for the 1997 general election, Sidek was part of the PAP team, consisting of George Yeo and Ker Sin Tze, contesting Aljunied GRC. The team won 67.02% of the votes against the SDP team.

Sidek became Parliamentary Secretary for Trade and Industry and Social Affairs in the fifth Lee Kuan Yew cabinet. Sidek eventually rose to become the Senior Minister of State for Education and the Environment under Prime Minister Goh Chok Tong. He retired from politics in 2001.

== Personal life ==
Sidek is married to Sharifa Binti Mirza Abdul Majid. His wife's youngest brother was Corporal Mirza Abdul Halim bin Mirza Abdul Majid, a police officer who was killed while pursuing a suspected burglar Ong Yeow Tian, who was subsequently sentenced to hang for his murder.

== Notes ==
Parliament of Singapore
New constituency	Member of Parliament for Kolam Ayer SMC; 1976 – 1988	GRC system established
New constituency	Member of Parliament for Jalan Besar GRC (Kolam Ayer); 1988 – 1991	Succeeded by Zulkifli Mohammed
Preceded by Zulkifli Mohammed	Member of Parliament for Eunos GRC (Eunos); 1991 – 1997	Constituency abolished
New constituency	Member of Parliament for Aljunied GRC (Eunos); 1997 – 2001	Succeeded by Zainul Abidin
