= Jufrie Mahmood =

Singaporean politician

Mohamed Jufrie bin Mahmood

5th Chairman of the Singapore Democratic Party
- In office 2011–2013
- Preceded by: Gandhi Ambalam
- Succeeded by: Jeffrey George

Personal details
- Born: 4 February 1950 (age 76) Colony of Singapore
- Party: Singapore Democratic Party
- Other political affiliations: Workers' Party (1984 – 1997)
- Children: 3

Mohamed Jufrie bin Mahmood (born 4 February 1950) is a Singaporean politician who served as Singapore Democratic Party (SDP) chairman from 2011 to 2013.

== Political career ==
At the 1984 Singaporean general election, Jufrie stood as a candidate for the Workers' Party (WP) in Kampong Kembangan Constituency. He was defeated by Yatiman Yusof of the governing People's Action Party (PAP) with 44.3% of the vote.

In February 1988, Jufrie left WP and joined the SDP.

At the 1988 Singaporean general election, Jufrie stood as an SDP candidate in the Aljunied Group Representation Constituency (GRC), alongside Ashleigh Seow and Neo Choon Aik. They were defeated by the PAP's team with 43.7% of the vote.

At the end of 1988, Jufrie was elected vice-chairman of SDP. In January 1989, Jufrie stepped down as SDP vice-chairman. SDP secrectary-general Chiam See Tong said Jufrie had resigned as he had intended to go for further studies in the United States.

Prior to the 1991 Singaporean general election, SDP secrectary-general Chiam announced that SDP and WP had agreed to allow candidates to switch parties so that candidates could contest the GRCs under a single party. Jufrie joined WP as part of cooperation between the two main opposition parties in Singapore. Jufrie later contested Eunos GRC with WP candidates Lee Siew Choh, Neo Choon Aik and Wee Han Kim. During the campaign, Prime Minister Goh Chok Tong accused him of Malay chauvinism, citing his comments about the role of the Malay community in Singapore and his use of the phrase "‍Insha'Allah" ("God willing") in a campaign speech. Goh suggested that Jufrie was playing communal politics and as a WP candidate, WP was implied to playing communal politics as well. Goh urged people not to vote for Jufrie in order to help protect inter-racial harmony in Singapore. Jufrie strongly denied that he was a Malay chauvinist and said that he was merely raising "important issues" which he felt needed to be addressed. Jufrie and his team were narrowly defeated by the PAP's team in Eunos by 41,673 votes (47.6%) to 45,833 (52.4%).

At the 1997 general election, Jufrie stood as a candidate for the SDP in the Jalan Besar GRC. He and his fellow SDP members David Chew, Gandhi Ambalam and Low Yong Nguan were defeated by the PAP's team by 21,537 votes (32.4%) to 44,840 (67.6%).

Jufrie was among a group of SDP members charged with participating in an unlawful political assembly on the driveway leading to Parliament House in 2008. He was fined after being found guilty of this offence.

Jufrie was elected the party chairman of the SDP in 2011 and served in this role until 2013.

On 12 March 2025, Minister for Law and Home Affairs, K. Shanmugam was confronted by two women from Monday of Palestine Solidarity group at his Meet-The-People session to address Protection from Online Falsehoods and Manipulation Act. The confrontation was recorded on video and lasted seven minutes. On 13 March, Calvin Cheng, a former Nominated Member of Parliament, in a facebook post, offered to send the activist group to Gaza, provided they do not return to Singapore and also told their Facebook followers to leave Singapore for Gaza. On 28 March, Jufrie filed a police report against Cheng for being an Islamophobe describing his actions as a “danger to our precious racial and religious harmony”. On 2 April, Cheng posted on Facebook that he will take legal action over defamatory statements made against him, including Jufrie who had filed a police report against him, Reform Party secretary-general Kenneth Jeyaretnam who asked for a probe against Cheng, and sociopolitical platform The Online Citizen.

On 10 April, Cheng posted on Facebook again that he had met with Ustaz Mohamad Hasbi Hassan and Ustaz Pasuni Maulan at Yusof Ishak Mosque in Woodlands on 9 April. He said that he told them he did not intend any attack and had spoken to the Malay/Muslim community over the previous week and had realised he should be more sensitive and not said to send people to a conflict zone. Cheng also asserted that other had spoken untrue statements about him and he had to take legal actions.

== Personal life ==
Jufrie had at least one daughter and two sons.
