= Eunos Group Representation Constituency =

Former electoral division in Singapore

Coordinates: 1.33°N 103.91°E

Eunos Group Representation Constituency (Simplified Chinese: 友诺士集选区;Traditional Chinese: 友諾士集選區) is a defunct Group Representation Constituency (GRC) in the north-eastern region of Singapore. This GRC existed for the 1988 and 1991 general election before being absorbed into Aljunied GRC and the brand new East Coast GRC for the 1997 general election.

== History ==
Eunos GRC was established in 1988 following the establishment of Group Representation Constituencies (GRC) and Single Member Constituencies (SMC).

During the 1988 general election, Minister of State for Education Tay Eng Soon led a PAP team to contest the GRC against a Workers' Party (WP) team led by Francis Seow. The PAP team won the contest with a narrow 1.78 percent margin, the lowest margin for a PAP win in the election. The WP team was the best losing candidates for a constituency and were offered two Non-constituency Member of Parliament (NCMP) seats (Only two were offered as Chiam See Tong won an opposition seat and the maximum to be offered was three minus any opposition seats won.). Both Seow and Lee Siew Choh accepted the offers and were declared elected as NCMPs on 16 September 1988. However, on 9 January 1989, the Speaker of Parliament Tan Soo Khoon announced that Seow had lost his seat with effect from 17 December 1988 under Article 45 of the Constitution after he was convicted and fined for tax evasion.

Prior to the 1991 Singaporean general election, SDP secrectary-general Chiam announced that SDP and WP had agreed to allow candidates to switch parties so that candidates could contest the GRCs under a single party. SDP member Jufrie Mahmood joined WP as part of cooperation between the two main opposition parties in Singapore. Jufrie later contested Eunos GRC with WP candidates Lee Siew Choh, Neo Choon Aik and Wee Han Kim. Jufrie and his team were narrowly defeated by the PAP's team in Eunos by 41,673 votes (47.6%) to 45,833 (52.4%).

After the 1991 election, Eunos GRC was redrawn into several different constituencies, owing to further developments in both Pasir Ris and Tampines which were both ready in the process. Therefore, it necessitated the redrawing. Kaki Bukit became one of the founding constituencies for the brand new East Coast GRC while Tampines North and Pasir Ris became the founding constituencies for the brand new Pasir Ris GRC due to further developments within Pasir Ris New Town and Neighbourhood 4 of Tampines. Most parts of Tampines New Town were given to Tampines GRC, with the constituency now known as Tampines Central. Eunos on the other hand, shifted to Aljunied GRC, making it five seats.

In 1993, Tay Eng Soon died of a heart failure in 1993. No by-election was called to fill in the vacant seat.

== Members of Parliament ==
Year	Division	Members of Parliament	Party
Formation
1988	Eunos; Kaki Bukit; Tampines North	Zulkifli Mohammed; Chew Heng Ching; Tay Eng Soon	PAP
1991	Eunos; Kaki Bukit; Tampines North; Pasir Ris	Sidek Saniff; Chew Heng Ching; Tay Eng Soon; Charles Chong	PAP
Constituency abolished (1997)

== Electoral results ==
Note: The Elections Department does not include rejected votes when calculating the vote shares of candidates. Hence, all candidates' vote shares will total to 100% at any given election (may not appear so in multi-way contests due to rounding).

=== Elections in 1980s ===
General Election 1988
Party	Candidate	Votes	%
PAP	Zulkifli Mohammed Tay Eng Soon Chew Heng Ching	36,500	50.89
WP	Francis Seow Lee Siew Choh Mohd Khalit bin Mohd Baboo	35,221	49.11
Majority		1,279	1.78
Total valid votes		71,721	98.16
Rejected ballots		1,344	1.84
Turnout		73,065	96.49
Registered electors		75,723	
PAP win (new seat)			

=== Elections in 1990s ===
General Election 1991
Party	Candidate	Votes	%	±%
PAP	Sidek Saniff Tay Eng Soon Chew Heng Ching Charles Chong	45,833	52.38	▲1.49
WP	Lee Siew Choh Jufrie Mahmood Wee Han Kim Maurice Neo Choon Aik	41,673	47.62	▼1.49
Majority		4,160	4.76	▲2.98
Total valid votes		87,506	97.89	▼0.27
Rejected ballots		1,889	2.11	▲0.27
Turnout		89,395	96.41	▼0.08
Registered electors		92,728		▲22.46
PAP hold		Swing	▲1.49	
