= Lee Siew Choh =

Singaporean politician (1917–2002)

- 李绍祖
- Lee in the 1950s

Member of the Legislative Assembly of Singapore for Queenstown
- In office 30 May 1959 – 21 September 1963
- Preceded by: Lee Choon Eng
- Succeeded by: Jek Yeun Thong

Chairman of the Barisan Sosialis
- In office 29 July 1961 – May 1988

Non-constituency Member of the 7th Parliament of Singapore
- In office 16 September 1988 – 14 August 1991
- Preceded by: Vacant
- Succeeded by: Vacant

Personal details
- Born: Lee Siew Choh; 1 November 1917 Kuala Lumpur, Selangor, Federated Malay States, British Malaya
- Died: 18 July 2002 (aged 84) Singapore
- Resting place: Mount Vernon Sanctuary, Singapore
- Citizenship: Singaporean
- Party: Workers' Party (1988–1993); Barisan Sosialis (1961–1988); People's Action Party (1957–1961)
- Spouse: Kathleen Fam-Lee (m. 1943–2002)
- Relations: Michael Fam (brother-in-law); Ivan Polunin (brother-in-law)
- Children: 4
- Education: Victoria Institution; King Edward VII College of Medicine
- Occupation: Physician, politician

Lee Siew Choh (Note: Chinese: 李绍祖; Jyutping: Lei^{5} Siu^{6} Zou^{2}; pinyin: Lǐ Shàozǔ) (1 November 1917 – 18 July 2002) was a Singaporean politician and physician. He was the Member of the Legislative Assembly for Queenstown Constituency between 1959 and 1963 and the non-constituency Member of Parliament (NCMP) between 1988 and 1991. (Note: Two NCMP seats were offered; however, Francis Seow, who had been slated to be the other NCMP, was expelled before the opening of the 7th Parliament after being convicted for tax evasion.)

Lee first entered Parliament during the 1959 general election representing Queenstown in colonial Singapore, consistent with the initial rise to power of the now-dominant People's Action Party (PAP); however, he left for Barisan Sosialis (BS) in 1961 when it was created as a defection from the PAP. After BS merged with the Workers' Party (WP) in 1988, Lee stood as a WP candidate for Eunos Group Representation Constituency (GRC) during the general election in the same year, becoming Singapore's first NCMP after obtaining the best result among defeated opposition candidates. He remained in the position until the 1991 general election.

== Biography ==
Lee was born in Kuala Lumpur (then located in Selangor in the Federated Malay States, the precursor to Malaysia) to Chinese parents of Cantonese descent and was educated at Victoria Institution, the city's premier school. He came to Singapore in 1934 and was trained as a medical doctor at King Edward VII College of Medicine (now the National University of Singapore's Medical Faculty).

After graduating in 1942, Lee joined Kandang Kerbau Hospital as a doctor. He then married a volunteer nurse, Kathleen Fam Yin Oi (1919 – 20 April 2017) who was also the elder sister of Michael Fam, a fellow Singaporean Chinese of Hakka descent and Malaysian Chinese ancestry hailing from the town of Sandakan, Sabah, Malaysia located in Borneo island in 1943 during the Japanese occupation of Singapore, he was later sent to work as a medical officer at the Thai-Burmese border for two years, where the Death Railway was constructed.

Lee was the secretary of the British Medical Association (Southern Branch).

== Political career ==
In 1959, Lee contested in the Singaporean general election for the Legislative Assembly under the PAP banner for the Queenstown. He was successfully elected and served as the Parliamentary Secretary for Home Affairs in 1960. In 1961, Lee and 13 other members of the assembly broke away from the PAP and formed the Barisan Sosialis. Lee was noted for his pro-leftist stance and oratory skills. In 1961, he made the longest speech in the history of Singapore's Legislative Assembly which lasted seven hours on the subject of Singapore's proposed merger with Malaya. Lee led the party in the 1963 elections, in which they won 13 of the 51 seats, although he himself failed to gain a seat.

In 1988, Socialist Front merged with the Workers' Party and Lee stood as a Workers' Party candidate in Eunos GRC at the 1988 Singaporean general election, along with Francis Seow and Mohd Khalit bin Mohd Baboo. They lost to the PAP's team in the constituency by 49.1% of the votes to 50.9%. As the Workers' Party's team in Eunos had garnered a higher percentage of the vote than any other opposition losing candidates, the party was eligible to nominate two members of its team from Eunos to become Non-constituency MPs. The party had refused to nominate NCMPs in the past, but this time they nominated Lee and Seow to become NCMPs. Seow was subsequently accused of espionage and fled to the United States before he could take up his NCMP seat. Lee became Singapore's first-ever NCMP, serving until the 1991 general election. In Parliament, he raised several issues, including the Internal Security Act, living costs and welfare.

Lee again stood in Eunos GRC at the 1991 Singaporean general election. He and fellow party members Jufrie Mahmood, Neo Choon Aik and Wee Han Kim again lost narrowly to the PAP's team by 47.6% of the votes to 52.4%. However no NCMP seats were offered following that election as the opposition parties won a combined total of four elected seats.

Lee left the Workers' Party in 1993, citing differences with the party's leader, Joshua Benjamin Jeyaretnam.

== Personal life ==
Lee married Kathleen Fam and had three sons. His eldest son died in 1992.

Lee died of lung cancer on 18 July 2002.

== See also ==
- Lim Chin Siong
- Chia Thye Poh

== Notes ==
Political offices
Parliament of Singapore
Preceded by Lee Choon Eng	Member of Parliament for Queenstown; 1959 – 1963	Succeeded by Jek Yeun Thong
First New office	Non-Constituency Member of Parliament; 1988 – 1997	Vacant Title next held by J.B. Jeyaretnam (1997 – 2001)
