= Tay Eng Soon =

Singaporean politician

- 郑永顺
- Tay in 1983

Minister of State for Communications and Information
- In office 2 January 1985 – 17 February 1986

Senior Minister of State for Education
- In office 13 September 1988 – 5 August 1993

Minister of State for Education
- In office 1 April 1981 – 12 September 1988

Member of the Singapore Parliament for Eunos GRC (Tampines North)
- In office 3 September 1988 – 5 August 1993
- Preceded by: Constituency established
- Succeeded by: Constituency abolished

Member of the Singapore Parliament for River Valley SMC
- In office 23 December 1980 – 2 September 1988

Personal details
- Born: Tay Eng Soon; 20 January 1940 Straits Settlements
- Died: 5 August 1993 (aged 53) Singapore
- Party: People's Action Party (1980-1993)
- Education: Anglo-Chinese School

Tay Eng Soon (Note: Chinese: 郑永顺; Pe̍h-ōe-jī: Tēⁿ Éng-sūn; pinyin: Zhèng Yǒngshùn) (20 January 1940 – 5 August 1993) was a Singaporean scientist and politician.

== Education ==
Tay was educated at the Anglo-Chinese School for his primary and secondary education. He was the top student for both schools. In 1960, he enrolled in the University of Bristol and obtained first class honours in Bachelor of Science in electrical engineering three years later. He continued his studies at University College London with a scholarship from the Royal Society, a scientific academy in the United Kingdom. He completed his studies there in 1966 and attained a doctorate in microwave engineering.

== Research and academic career ==
After receiving his doctorate in 1966, Tay joined the Culham Centre for Fusion Energy of the United Kingdom Atomic Energy Authority as a research associate, conducting fusion research.

Tay returned to Singapore in 1970, joining the University of Singapore’s Department of Electrical Engineering as a lecturer. He was one of 23 nuclear scientists in Singapore then and the only one specialising in nuclear power. Tay served as vice-president and president of the University of Singapore Academic Staff Union.

At the same time, Tay also led the Electronics Test Centre, a small research and development (R&D) outfit under the Security and Intelligence Division of the Ministry of Defence (MINDEF), developing Singapore’s defence technology capabilities. The centre was renamed the Defence Science Organisation (DSO; now known as DSO National Laboratories) in 1977. In 1978, Tay left his position as associate professor at the University of Singapore and became the DSO's director, serving until 1980 to enter politics.

== Political career ==
Tay entered politics in 1980, serving as a Member of Parliament for River Valley Constituency with walkovers in both 1980 and 1984 General Elections.

He was appointed Minister of State for Education on 1 April 1981, and was promoted to Senior Minister of State for Education on 13 September 1988, following the 1988 election. He also served as Minister of State for Communications and Information from 2 January 1985 to 17 February 1986.

Tay left his River Valley seat to lead a three-member PAP team that ran against the Workers' Party team for the battleground constituency of Eunos GRC in the 1988 general election. The PAP narrowly defeated WP with 50.89% of the valid votes in that ward.

During the 1991 General Election, Tay was part of the four-member PAP team against the Workers' Party team. The PAP team defeated the WP team for the second time with 52.28%, a small swing to the PAP. Tay was a Member of Parliament of Eunos GRC for Tampines North ward from 1988 to 1993 as he died on 5 August 1993 due to heart failure during his term in office.

=== Contributions to education and technology ===
On 1 June 1981, as Minister of State for Education, Dr Tay became in charge of the three industrial and vocational training institutes in Singapore then: Singapore Polytechnic, Ngee Ann Technical College (now known as the Ngee Ann Polytechnic), and the Vocational and Industrial Training Board (VITB). He was also appointed chairman of VITB that same month. Dr Tay expanded polytechnic enrolment rapidly and established Nanyang Polytechnic, the fourth polytechnic in Singapore, and the Singapore Open University Degree Programme to meet anticipated future demand in the labour market. Tay developed the VITB and laid the foundation for the establishment of the Institute of Technical Education (ITE) as a post-secondary educational institution in 1992, replacing the VITB.

Tay took a personal interest in driving national initiatives such as BEST (Basic Education for Skills Training) and WISE (Worker Improvement through Secondary Education) under VITB’s Continuing Education and Training system to raise the educational level of the workforce. In 1992, the ITE was established and it replaced the VITB. As chairman of ITE, Tay ensured that the technical training provided by the institute was tailored to the needs of the economy. He also set up ITE’s Centre for Music and the Arts to help develop students’ talents, confidence and public speaking skills through music, arts and culture

To honour Dr Tay’s legacy, the Tay Eng Soon Scholarship Fund was launched in 1993 to enable ITE graduates to further their education in a polytechnic. In addition, the convention centre at the new College Central campus, where ITE’s headquarters is also located, was named the Tay Eng Soon Convention Centre in 2013, while the library at the Singapore Institute of Management headquarters was named the Tay Eng Soon Library.

== Personal life ==
Tay was married to Rosalyn Carson, a scientist, and had 2 daughters and a son.

Tay was hospitalised on 2 August 1993 and died of acute heart failure on 5 August.

== Legacy ==
One of the two libraries at the Singapore Institute of Management is named after him, in recognition of Tay's contributions to the SIM's UK Open University Degree Programme.

The Tay Eng Soon Health Sciences Award, Tay Eng Soon Gold Medal, and Tay Eng Soon Convention Centre at ITE College Central are named after him.

== See also ==
- List of members of the Singapore Parliament who died in office
