= Bedok MRT station =

Mass Rapid Transit station in Singapore

Bedok EW5 勿洛 பிடோக்
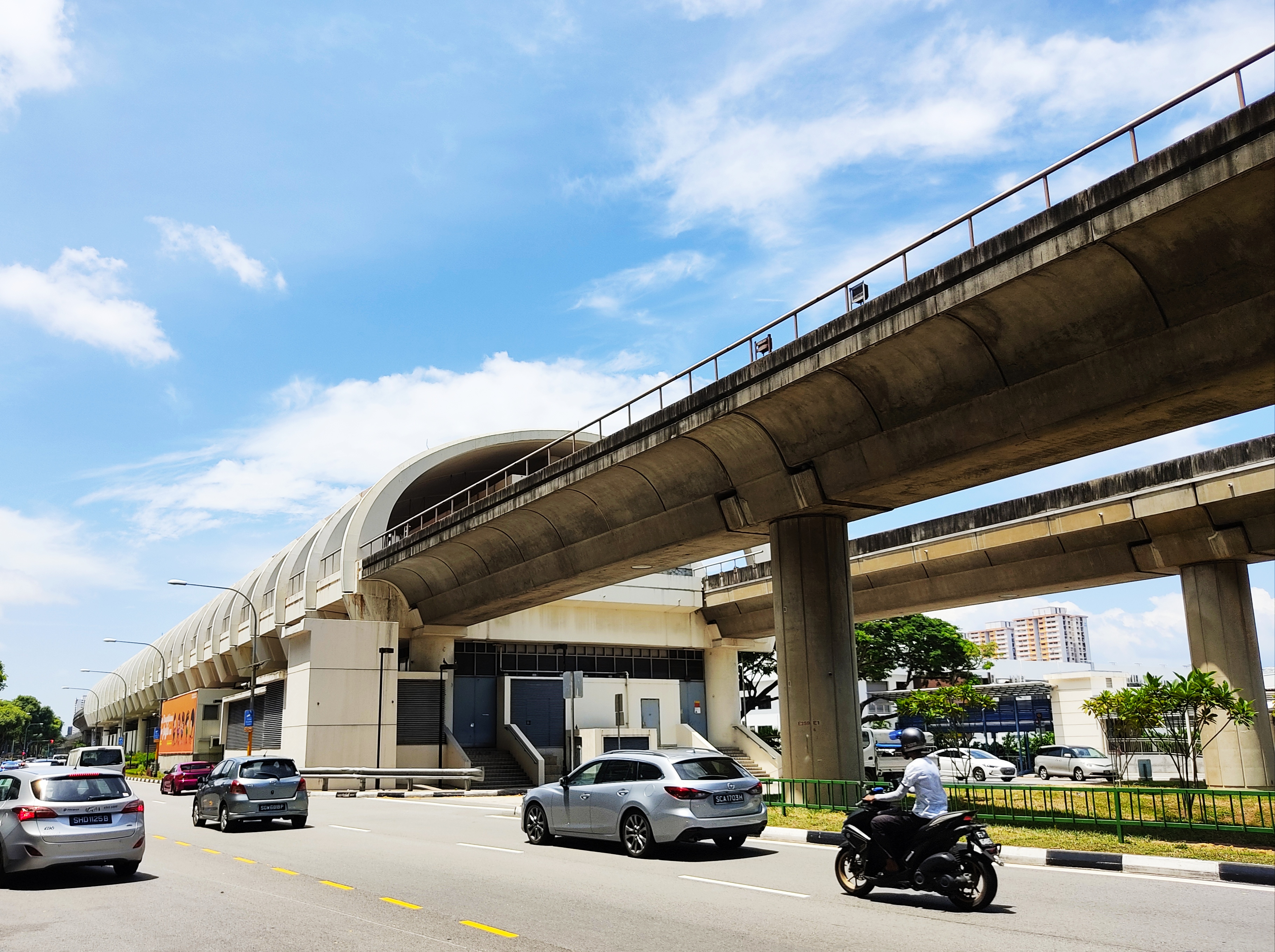
- Exterior of Bedok MRT station.

General information
- Location: 315 New Upper Changi Road, Singapore 467347
- Coordinates: 01°19′26.54″N 103°55′48.13″E
- System: Mass Rapid Transit (MRT) station
- Owner: Land Transport Authority
- Operator: SMRT Trains
- Line: East–West Line
- Platforms: 2 (1 island platform)
- Tracks: 2
- Connections: Bedok, Taxi

Construction
- Structure type: Elevated
- Platform levels: 1
- Cycle facilities: Yes
- Accessible: Yes

Other information
- Station code: BDK

History
- Opened: 4 November 1989; 37 years ago
- Closed: 21 and 28 January 2018; 8 years ago (Note: Track works and testing for a new signalling system.)
- Former names: Chai Chee

Passengers
- June 2024: 30,760 per day

Services
Preceding station	Mass Rapid Transit	Following station
Tanah Merah towards Pasir Ris	East–West Line	Kembangan towards Tuas Link
Track layout
Location
- Location within Singapore Rail

Bedok MRT station (Note: /bəˈdoʊk/ bə-DOHK) is an elevated Mass Rapid Transit (MRT) station on the East–West Line (EWL) in Bedok, Singapore. Operated by SMRT Trains, the station serves the Bedok area and its landmarks such as Bedok Bus Interchange and Bedok Mall.

First announced in May 1982 as Chai Chee, it was renamed to Bedok the following year and confirmed to be part of Phase II of the MRT system. It commenced operations on 4 November 1989 along with other stations on the eastern stretch of the line. Half-height platform screen doors were installed at the station in 2012, along with high-volume-low-speed fans the following year. The station was temporarily closed on 21 and 28 January 2018.

Built with a dome-shaped segmented roof and an island platform layout on the top floor, the station is two-stories tall and is connected to its exits by underground passageways. As part of SMRT's heritage-themed public art display, there is a mural that details the history and landmarks of Bedok.

== History ==
The Mass Rapid Transit (MRT) system was conceptualised in a 1971 study conducted by the Singapore Government and the United Nations Development Programme. The study – which assessed land-use transportation needs – concluded that Singapore would need a rail transit system by 1992. Further studies and debates on the feasibility of building a rapid transit system took place from 1972 to 1980, with Chai Chee station appearing in initial plans by May 1982. Chai Chee was proposed to be constructed as part of the 32.6 kilometres (20.3 mi) East–West Line (EWL), which was to have 22 stations and run from Jurong West to Bedok. On 30 May 1982, communications minister Ong Teng Cheong confirmed that the government approved construction of the MRT; Chai Chee station was renamed to Bedok by October 1983. (Note: Bedok station was also renamed to Changi station by October 1983.) The system was planned to be constructed in three phases, with Bedok part of "Phase II", which was 32.6 kilometres (20.3 mi) long and composed of 22 stations. (Note: Although previous studies concluded that the EWL should be constructed first, the government chose to construct the North–South Line (NSL) first, another line proposed in those studies, though The Straits Times noted that this would not imply that the NSL would have to be built first before the EWL can begin construction.) Phase II would be constructed in different sections, with Bedok specifically part of "Phase IIA", which consisted of 13 stations from City Hall to Pasir Ris. Stations under Phase II were planned to start construction while Phase I stations are under construction to ensure that the MRT would be fully open by the early 1990s.

From May to June 1984, the Mass Rapid Transit Corporation (MRTC) called for the prequalification of consultants to design the civil, architectural, and structural works for Phase IIA stations. Ten companies were shortlisted by July, and the contract was awarded to an American–Singapore consortium between De Leuw Cather, Wilbur Smith & Associates, Skidmore Owings Merrill, and Singaporean firm RSP Architects in October for S$11.5 million (1984) (US$5.39 million). The Straits Times reported in November that Phase II was ahead of schedule by two years due to the successful timing for Phase I. There were seven tenderers that prequalified for Contract 304 by May 1985, which detailed the construction of Bedok and Kembangan stations and viaducts and cut-and-cover tunnels from Kembangan to Changi stations. Ultimately, the contract was awarded to a partnership between the Obayashi Corporation and Resources Development Pte Ltd for S$70 million (1986) (US$32.15 million) in January 1986.

Construction of Bedok station began in March 1986. In order for the station to be constructed, New Upper Changi Road had to be widened. By December 1987, Bedok was expected to be completed by September 1989. Although stations in the City Hall–Changi stretch were initially expected to commence operations by December 1989, The Straits Times reported in February 1989 that Phase IIA was ahead of schedule and could commence operations in the last quarter of the year. Civil works for Bedok station were fully completed by April 1989 and from September, test runs were conducted on the City Hall–Tanah Merah (Note: Changi station was renamed to Tanah Merah in March 1987.) stretch to check the trains and tracks. By then, communications minister Yeo Ning Hong announced that stations within the City Hall–Tanah Merah stretch would open on 18 November, though the opening date was moved to 4 November in September as the test runs were ahead of schedule. Bedok, along with other stations between Marina Bay and Tanah Merah, opened on 4 November 1989. During its opening day, 17,614 people entered the station before 20:00 Singapore Standard Time (UTC+08:00).

External media
- Site of Bedok station when it was confirmed for construction
- A map of Bedok station by July 1986
- Photograph of commuters at Bedok station on opening day

Plans to build a 150 metres (490 ft) shelter linking the station to the Bedok bus interchange were unveiled in July 1990 as the Bedok Town Council's first major project, and was completed by June 1992. (Note: A letter from a commuter sent to The Straits Times noted that the lack of a sheltered walkway to the bus interchange caused overcrowding.) In September 2000, a 70-year-old man was run over by an eastbound train outside of the station. The driver did see the man and applied emergency brakes, though it was too late. Following an increase in track intrusions, the Land Transport Authority (LTA) and SMRT decided to install platform screen doors at all elevated MRT stations. After several successful tests at different stations, works to install half-height platform screen doors were expected to start in 2010; they were installed at Bedok station by August 2011.

== Details ==
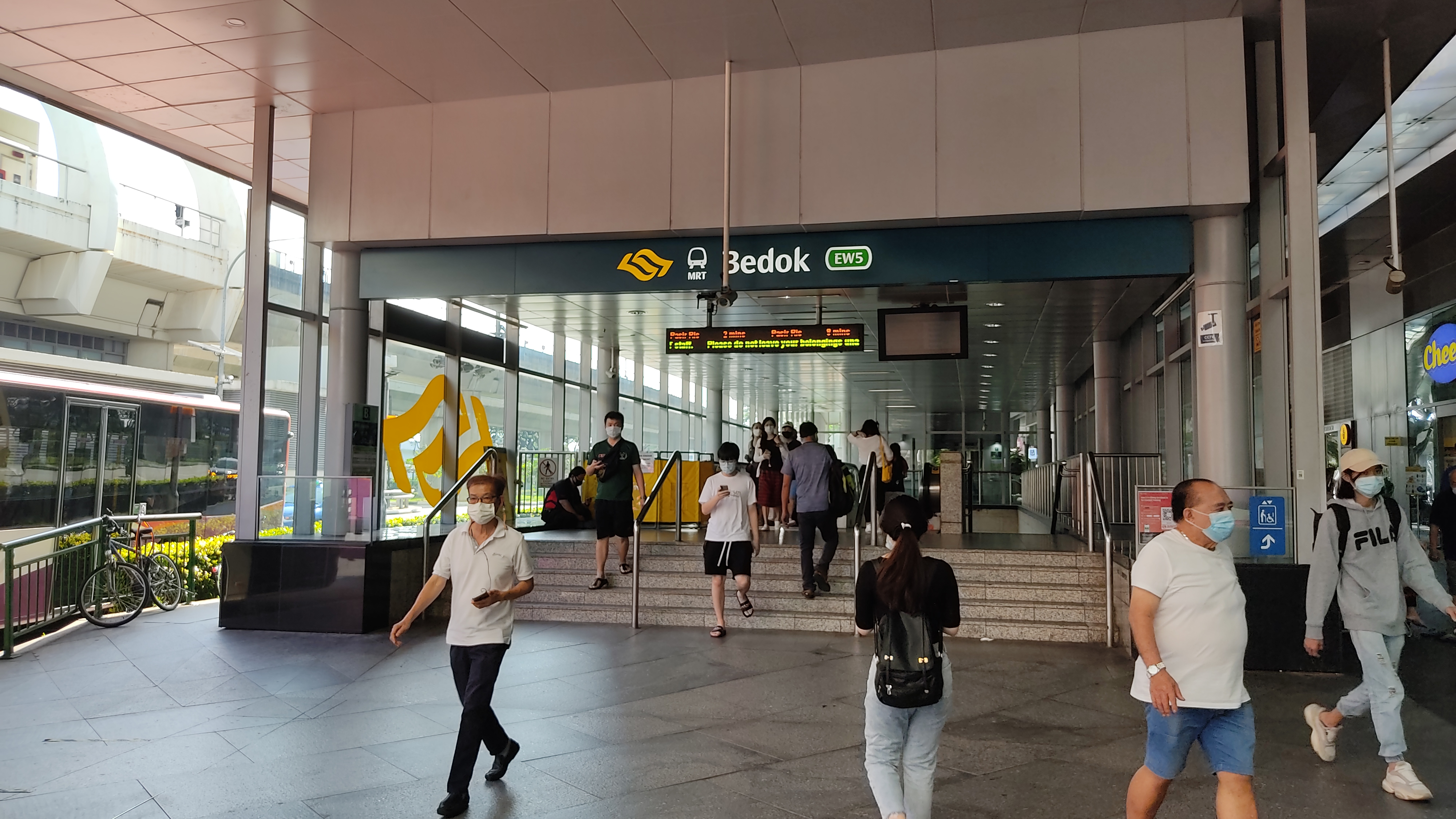
A subway exit of the station

Bedok station, located in the Bedok planning area of the East Region, is situated on a traffic island in the central median of New Changi Upper Road, opposite of Bedok Bus Interchange. Under the New Rail Financing Framework, it is owned by the LTA. Bedok is between Tanah Merah and Kembangan stations on the EWL with the station code EW5; as part of the EWL, it is operated by SMRT Trains. When it opened, the station had the station code of E8 and received its current station code in August 2001 as a part of a system-wide campaign to cater to the expanding MRT system. The station operates from 5:45 am to 12:25 am daily, with train frequencies varying from 2 to 5 minutes during peak hours to an average of 5 minutes for off-peak hours.

External media
- Locality map of Bedok station
- Model of the dome roof
- Eunos's Comic Connect murals

Bedok is a two-story, elevated station. The station's concourse has a ticketing office and the electrical and mechanical plant rooms. Like many MRT stations on the initial network, its platforms are in the island platform configuration. Both floors were designed to be column-free, with the platforms intended to give commuters ease of movement; the platform level is supported by the columns of the station's rail viaducts and has the signalling and telecommunications room. The platforms have high-volume low-speed fans, which were installed by the first quarter of 2013. Bedok station is connected to both sides of New Upper Changi Road via underground linkways, and has three exits serving the Bedok Mall, Bedok Bus Interchange and its eponymous hawker centre, Heartbeat@Bedok, and Bedok Point. Bedok is wheelchair-accessible and has bicycle facilities.

Similar to most Phase IIA stations, Bedok has a dome-shaped roof. (Note: The exception is Eunos, which has a traditional Malay-style roof.) The roof – which spans 23 metres (75 ft) across the platform and tracks – is made of a 7 metres (23 ft) high parabolic arched canopy supported by 25 precast concrete ribs at 6.25 metres (20.5 ft) centres, with a 150 millimetres (5.9 in) thick roof slab between the ribs. The design was an attempt by the MRTC to give the stations on the EWL an "attractive look"; The Straits Times has compared it to a caterpillar in one article and a rib cage in another article. Additionally, as a part of SMRT's heritage-themed artwork showcase Comic Connect, the station features a mural created by students from APSN Katong school, which showcases Bedok's history and landmarks such as the Bedok Reservoir, Opera and Frankel residential estates, Simpang Bedok (a former village turned food hub), and the NEWater Visitor Centre. The process, from research to submission, took two to three weeks, and the mural was unveiled at the station in June 2024.
