= Bedok Bus Interchange =

Singaporean bus interchange

Bedok Bus Interchange 勿洛巴士转换站 Pusat Pertukaran Bas Bedok
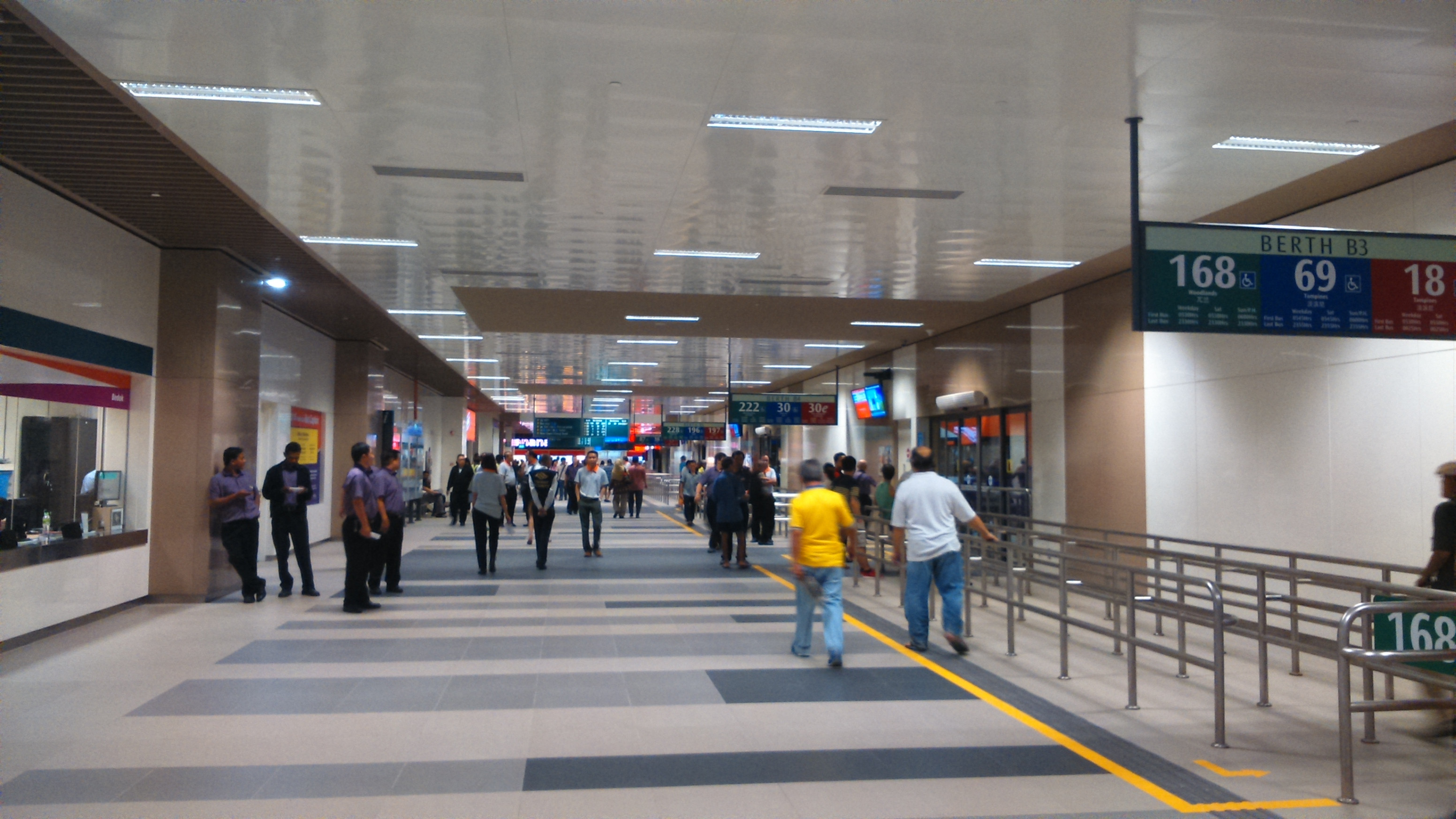
- Interior of Bedok Bus Interchange.

General information
- Location: 12 Bedok North Drive, Singapore 465492
- System: Public Bus Interchange
- Owner: Land Transport Authority
- Operator: SBS Transit
- Bus routes: 24 (SBS Transit); 1 (Tower Transit Singapore); 3 (Go-Ahead Singapore)
- Bus stands: 10 Sawtooth Boarding Berths; 5 Alighting Berths
- Bus operators: SBS Transit; Tower Transit Singapore; Go-Ahead Singapore
- Connections: EW5 Bedok

Construction
- Structure type: At-grade
- Accessible: Accessible alighting/boarding points Accessible public toilets Graduated kerb edges Tactile guidance system

History
- Opened: 25 February 1979; 47 years ago (Old); 19 November 2011; 14 years ago (Temporary); 30 November 2014; 11 years ago (Integrated Transport Hub)
- Closed: 18 November 2011; 14 years ago (Old); 29 November 2014; 11 years ago (Temporary)

Key dates
- 25 February 1979: Commenced operations
- 19 November 2011: Operations transferred to Temporary bus interchange
- 30 November 2014: Operations transferred to new and air-conditioned bus interchange as Integrated Transport Hub
Location

Bedok Bus Interchange is an air-conditioned bus interchange located at Bedok Town Centre, serving residential areas around Bedok, Tanah Merah, Bedok Reservoir, Upper East Coast and Marine Parade. It is the seventh air-conditioned bus interchange in Singapore, integrated within Bedok Mall shopping centre and Bedok Residences condominium, and located a short distance away from Bedok MRT station. Nearby public amenities include Bedok Hawker Centre, Bedok Polyclinic, Bedok Point, Bedok Public Library and Heartbeat at Bedok.

== History ==
The original facility opened on 25 February 1979. It was the first interchange in Singapore to use a colour-coded queue scheme.

Soon after it opened, in 1981, the interchange was partially demolished and expanded at a cost of S$3 million, and work was completed in 1983. After the expansion, the interchange covered 1.7 hectares (4.2 acres) and had 32 end-on berths, 7 sawtooth berths and 33 remote parking bays. Several bus services were moved to the interchange from Chai Chee Bus Terminal when the terminal closed in 1985. Bedok MRT station opened in 1989 at the south of the original facility, complementing the bus interchange to serve people travelling within Bedok town and also the nearby East Coast Park.

Based on the Urban Redevelopment Authority's 2003 Master Plan, it was indicated that the bus interchange would be redeveloped. This was confirmed in early 2011 when the Housing and Development Board (HDB) announced plans to rejuvenate Bedok, which involved redeveloping the Bedok town centre and rebuilding the original facility into an air-conditioned one, integrated with a proposed commercial development (Bedok Mall) and proposed residential development (Bedok Residences), resembling Boon Lay Bus Interchange. The original facility was demolished after 32 years of operations, to make way for the development.

On 19 November 2011, the original bus interchange moved to a temporary site along Bedok North Drive to allow the original facility to be rebuilt as planned.

The new Bedok Integrated Transport Hub (ITH) began operations on 30 November 2014. With the completion of the ITH, Bedok residents are able to transfer in air-conditioned comfort between bus and MRT services at Bedok MRT station. It was the 7th bus interchange in Singapore to be air-conditioned.

== Bus Contracting Model ==
Under the Bus Contracting Model, all bus services operating from Bedok Bus Interchange were divided into nine bus packages, operated by three different bus operators.

=== List of bus services ===
Operator	Package	Routes
Go-Ahead Singapore	Loyang	17, 17A
Go-Ahead Singapore	Tampines	38, 69
SBS Transit	Bedok	9, 9A, 14, 14A, 30, 30e, 35, 35A, 35M, 40, 168, 196, 196A, 222, 222A, 225G, 225W, 228, 229, 401
SBS Transit	Bishan-Toa Payoh	26, 155
SBS Transit	Bukit Merah	16, 16M
SBS Transit	Clementi	7, 7A, 32, 33, 33B, 197
SBS Transit	Sengkang-Hougang	87
SBS Transit	Serangoon-Eunos	60 (Until June 2027)
SMRT Buses	Serangoon-Eunos	60 (From June 2027)
Tower Transit Singapore	Sembawang-Yishun	854, 854e
