= List of Malay Singaporeans =

This article contains a list of notable Malay Singaporeans, individuals of Malay ancestry who were born or naturalised in Singapore. Among the Malays in Singapore, the last name is patronymic rather than a family name. Individuals should be referred to by their given first or second name. The Malay terms bin (b.) and binte (bte.) mean "son of" and "daughter of," respectively.

== Academia ==
- Ahmad Mohamed Ibrahim (1916–1999): law professor; studied at St. John's College, Cambridge; won Municipal Commission Election as an independent; first Attorney-General of Singapore; Singapore's ambassador to Egypt; Professor of Legal Studies, University of Malaya (1969–1972); Dean of Faculty of Law, University of Malaya (1972–1983); Shaikh and the Dean of the Kulliyyah of Laws, University of Malaysia (1983–1999).
- Hadijah Rahmat: Associate Professor, PhD in Malay-Indonesian Studies from University of London; Deputy Head of Asian Languages and Culture at Nanyang Technological University; author or editor of over 40 books and chapters, numerous academic papers, two poetry books, and two children's books; specializes in Malay and Singapore Malay literature, Malay settlements and socio-cultural developments in Singapore.
- Hussin Mutalib: Associate Professor; PhD from University of Sydney, Australia; Department of Political Science at the National University of Singapore (1980s– ); author of six books and multiple academic papers on Islam and Muslims in Southeast Asia.
- Lily Zubaidah Rahim: Associate Professor of Politics at the University of Sydney, Australia; lectures on Southeast Asian Politics and Political Islam; written and edited multiple books and chapters including The Singapore Dilemma: The Political and Educational Marginality of the Malay Community (2001) and Singapore in the Malay World: Building and Breaching Regional Bridges (2009); daughter of Abdul Rahim Ishak, Senior Minister of State (Foreign Affairs), and niece of Singapore's first president, Yusof Ishak.
- Po'ad bin Shaik Abu Bakar Mattar: former Pro-chancellor, Nanyang Technological University

== Arts and entertainment ==
- Aaron Mustapha bin Aziz (1976– ): TV and film actor better known as Aaron Aziz; his 2011 film, KL Gangster, was the highest grossing in Malaysian box office history until 2014.
- Abdul Wahid Bin Ahmad or Wahid Satay (1930–2023): singer, comedian and actor; appeared in many Malay films of the 1950s to 1960s; known by the moniker "Satay" after his role as a satay seller in the Malay horror movie Pontianak (1957); awarded the Perdana Golden Award (2007).
- Ahmad Jaafar (1919–2009): composer and musician; composed many songs for Malay films; conductor of the Radio & Television of Singapore (1967–1984); awarded Public Service Medal (1970), Cultural Medallion (1982), Composers and Authors Society of Singapore (COMPASS) Artistic Excellence Award (1998), and COMPASS Lifetime Achievement Award (2005).
- Bani Buang (1930–1996): regarded as the "father of modern Malay drama"; produced and directed the 1970s Malay TV series Sandiwara; headed the Malay Drama Unit of the Singapore Broadcasting Corporation; awarded the Cultural Medallion in its first year (1979).
- Hanis Saini Hussey (1964– ): fashion model; crowned 'Catwalk Model of the Year Singapore' (1982); first Asian to close the Yves Saint Laurent fall-winter show (1983); modeled for Balmain, Givenchy, Ungaro, Lanvin, Dior and Jean-Louis Scherrer; first Singapore model to appear on the cover of Time Magazine Asia.
- Hazlina Abdul Halim (1985– ): television presenter, journalist and radio announcer; presenter on Mediacorp Suria's news program, Berita.
- Iskandar Ismail (1956–2014): composer, conductor, musical director and record producer; arranged for the Shanghai Philharmonic Orchestra, Singapore Symphony Orchestra, Istana Budaya Orchestra of Malaysia, China National Opera & Ballet Orchestra, Singapore National Day Parade, and Chingay Parade; produced for Cantopop kings Jacky Cheung and Aaron Kwok and Hong Kong singer Sandy Lam; awarded the Cultural Medallion (2008).
- Iskandar Jalil (1940– ): ceramist who integrates Japanese and Islamic styles; his works owned by the National Museum of Sweden, Sultan of Brunei, former American President George H Bush, and the former Governor of Hong Kong.
- Ithnaini binte Mohd Taib or Anita Sarawak (1952– ): singer, host and actress who appeared in several Malay films in the 1960s; performed at Caesars Palace in the 1980s; inducted into the Singapore Women's Hall of Fame (2017); daughter of actress Siput Sarawak.
- Marpiah binti Abdul Rahim or Momo Latiff (1921– 2015): singer, comedienne and actress in many Malay films (1930s–1970s); awarded the Johan Pingat Sarawak medal (2007).
- Mohd Najip Bin Ali or Najip Ali: TV personality; host of the star-search TV programme Asia Bagus (1990s); fired for a comment he made about Malaysian Prime Minister Najib Razak (2017).
- Imran Othman: Industrial Designer; Motorcycle Designer; Design of the Year(2011); Best Industrial Design Consultancy(2019)
- Muhammad (Idris) Nuridris or stagename: "A-trez" or "A'trez" (1986 - ) : Rapper, hip hop songwriter based in Malaysia who written and collaborated with Altimet, Noorhaqmal Mohamed Noor (Aqmal N), Ryan Deedat and Erwin Dawson.
- Muhammad Mirzahady Bin Amir or Hady Mirza (1980 – ): singer; winner of the reality TV competition Singapore Idol (2006) and the first Asian Idol (2007).
- Muhammad Taufik Bin Batisah or Taufik Batisah (1981– ): singer, songwriter and producer; winner of the first reality TV competition Singapore Idol (2004); released five albums between 2007 and 2014.
- Nuraliza Osman (1977– ): winner of Miss Singapore Universe (2002); lawyer with Rajah & Tann; legal counsel with Shell Eastern Petroleum (2005).
- Noorhaqmal Mohamed Noor or Aqmal N. (1984 – ): singer and songwriter; winner of multiple awards from Mediacorp.
- Nordin Ahmad (1932–1971): actor who was a protege of P. Ramlee and appeared in 49 films in his 15-year career; especially remembered for his roles as a tragic hero in Air Mata Duyong (A Mermaid's Tears), Dang Anum, Raden Mas and Hang Jebat.
- Norleena Salim (1973– ): popular TV actress, comedian and singer; known for her role as Rosnah in Mediacorp's sitcom Under One Roof.
- Ramlah binti Mohamad Sulaiman or Siput Sarawak (1921–1999): acted in about 50 films in the 1950s and 1960s; best known for playing the "bad girl" and evil characters; won the Veteran Artist Award at the 9th Malaysian Film Festival (1991); mother of Anita Sarawak.
- Ramli Sarip (1952– ): singer and recording artist; known as "Papa Rock" and as one of the founders of the Singapore rock scene; seven albums with his group Sweet Charity (late 1970s–1980s); eight solo albums (as of 2011); awarded the COMPASS Artistic Excellence Award (1998).
- Salmah binti Ismail or Saloma (1935–1983): singer, actress, and fashion icon; acted in many films including Azimat, Seniman Bujang Lapok, and Ahmad Albab.
- Sarkasi Said (1940–2021): known as the "Baron of Batik"; has exhibited worldwide; represented in many public and private collections including the National Museum of Singapore and the offices of the Singapore High Commissions in Brunei and Kuala Lumpur; held a Guinness World Record for creating the world's longest batik artwork at 103.9 m (341 ft) (2003); served on the National Arts Council and as Chairman of Public Affairs and Education at the Malay Heritage Foundation.
- Sezairi Sezali (1987– ): singer, winner of the reality TV series competition Singapore Idol (Third Season, 2009).
- Shamsuddin bin Dali or S. Shamsuddin (1928–2013): actor and comedian; acted in over 30 movies (1950s and 1960s) including Nujum Pak Belalang (Mr. Grasshopper the Astrologer, 1959), Nasib Si Labu Labi (Labu's and Labi's Luck, 1963) and Tiga Abdul (The Three Abduls, 1964).
- Sharif Medan (1905–1997): actor; known as "Father of Bangsawan" because of his background in bangsawan (Malay Opera); in the first Malay talkie film Laila Majnun and a number of other Malay films in the 1950s and 1960s; in the regular cast of the Malay TV series Sandiwara (1970s).
- Som Binte Mohamed Said (1951– ): dancer, instructor and choreographer of Malay dance; holds a degree in Dance Anthropology (Sarjana Seni - IKJ, Indonesia); dancer with Singapore's National Dance Company; formed the Sriwana Children's Dance section; presented with the National Youth Service award (1979), the Cultural Medallion (1987), and the Public Service Medal (1992).
- Suhaimi Yusof: actor & comedian; acted in sitcoms such as Police & Thief and The Noose.
- Wandly Yazid (1925–2005): composer and arranger of Malay film music in the 1940s to 1960s; member of Singapore Symphony Orchestra and Singapore Broadcasting Corporation
- Yusof Latiff (1922–1998): actor who appeared in a number of Malay films in the 1950s and 1960s, the weekly Malay TV series Sandiwara (1970s), and on Radio & Television of Singapore Channel 5.
- Zaiton Abdullah: actress; has acted in films such as Bujang Lapok, Anak-ku Sazali and Ibu Mertuaku.
- Zubir Said (1907–1987): musician and composer; worked for Cathay-Keris Film Productions for 12 years; composed the Singapore National Anthem Majulah Singapura; awarded the Sijil Kemuliaan (Certificate of Honour, 1963), the Public Service Star (1963), the Cultural Medallion (1971), and a Lifetime Achievement Award by COMPASS (1995).

== Entrepreneurs (start-ups) ==
- Mohamed Salleh Marican: founding chairman and chief executive officer of Second Chance Properties

== Library and information sciences ==
- To be Updated

== Literature and culture ==
- Alfian Sa'at (1977– ): writer, poet and playwright; published works include Corridor which received a Singapore Literature Prize Commendation Award (1998) .
- Isa Kamari (1960– ): writer, published works include seven novels, including Memeluk Gerhana (2008) and Intercession (2010), two collections of poetry, a collection of short stories, two television scripts and two plays; received the S.E.A Write Award (2006), the Cultural Medallion (2007), and the Anugerah Tun Seri Lanang, the highest Malay literary award (2009).
- Masuri Salikun or Masuri S. N. (1927–2005): poet, writer and playwright; fellow at the Institute of Southeast Asian Studies and Iowa University; resident writer of the Malaysian Language Institute and the National University of Singapore; founding member of Asas '50; recipient of the Public Service Star (2000); notable works include Awan Putih (White Cloud, 1958) and Dalam Merenung Dalam (In Deep Thought, 2006).
- Mohamed Latiff Mohamed (1950– ): writer and social activist; three-time winner of Singapore Literature Prize in 2004, 2006 and 2008 for Bagiku Sepilah Sudah (It's Quiet For Me), an anthology of poetry, Nostalgia Yang Hilang (Lost Nostalgia), a collection of short stories, and Bila Rama-Rama Patah Sayapnya (When the Butterfly Breaks Its Wing); winner of the Cultural Medallion (2013).
- Dr. Mohamed Pitchay Gani Bin Mohamed Abdul Aziz (1967– ): writer, lecturer, educator, teacher, researcher, editor and social activist;field of expertise is Malay literature and language; Lifetime president of Angkatan Sasterwan' 50 (2009– ).
- Eunos Abdullah Mohammad or Mohd Eunos Abdullah (1876–1934): writer and social activist; member of the Johore royal family; ran Malay language newspaper Utusan Melayu (1912–1914); first Malay member of the Straits Settlements Legislative Council (1924); first president of Singapore Malay Union, 1926.
- Muhammad Ariff Ahmad (1924–2016): teacher, expert and activist of Malay language and culture; founding member of Asas '50 (1950); co-wrote the lyrics for Singapore's National Anthem (1959); first winner of Tun Seri Lanang Award (1993); awarded the Cultural Medallion (1987) and Public Service Star (2000).
- Muhammad Jailani Abu Talib (1985– ): writer and poet; won Golden Point Award (2nd) for short stories (2009); poems published in Reflecting On The Merlion: An Anthology of Poems (2009) and From The Window of This Epoch (2010).

== Military and police ==
- Syed Mohamed Ahmad Alsagoff: commander of the Malaysian Armed Forces in Singapore, 1963–1965
- Mirza Abdul Halim Mirza Abdul Majid, a police constable who was shot in the head by a housebreaking suspect and died in a coma 33 hours later. Abdul Halim was given the rare field promotion of Corporal for his bravery and in the aftermath, the killer Ong Yeow Tian was executed for his murder and shooting at two other officers.

== Politics ==
- Abdul Rahim Ishak (1925–2001): Minister of Education (1965–1968) and Senior Minister of Foreign Affairs (1972–1981); brother of the first President of Singapore, Yusof Ishak.
- Abdul Samad Ismail (1924–2008): journalist and leading Malay political activist in the 1950s and 60s; founding member of the People's Action Party (PAP); received the Ramon Magsaysay Award for Journalism, Literature and Creative Communications Arts in 1994.
- Abdullah Tarmugi (1944– ): Member of Parliament (MP) for Siglap Single Member Constituency (SMC) (1984–1991), Bedok Group Representation Constituency (GRC) (1991–1996), and East Coast GRC (1996–2011); Minister for Community Development (1994–2000) and Minister-in-charge of Muslim Affairs (1996–2002); seventh Speaker of the Singapore Parliament (2002–2011); Presidential Council for Minority Rights (1994– ).
- Ahmad Ibrahim (b. 1927–d. 1962): MP for the Sembawang constituency as an independent and, later, as a member of the PAP; Minister for Health (1959–1961); Minister for Labor (1961–1962).
- Ahmad Mattar (1940– ): member of parliament for Leng Kee SMC (1972–1976), Minister-in-charge of Muslim Affairs (1977–1996), and Minister for the Environment (1985–1995) where he is credited with cleaning up the Singapore River; Chairman of IMC Technologies, a private educational institution.
- Muhamad Faisal Manap (1975– ): MP for Aljunied GRC (2011– ) and member of the Workers' Party.
- Harun Abdul Ghani (1939–2005): MP for the now-defunct Hong Kah GRC (1991–2001).
- Othman Wok (1924–2017): first Minister for Social Affairs (1963–1977) and MP for Pasir Panjang SMC (1963–1977); Ambassador to Indonesia (1977–1981), Presidential Council for Minority Rights (1981– ).
- Sha'ari Tadin (1932–2009): MP for Kampong Chai Chee SMC (1968–1976) and Bedok SMC (1976–1980); Senior Parliamentary Secretary to the Minister for Culture (1972–1976); principal of Telok Kurau Secondary School (1977).
- Prof Yaacob Ibrahim (1955– ): MP for Jalan Besar GRC (1997–2011) and Moulmein-Kallang GRC (2011– ); Mayor of Central Singapore District (2001); Minister-in-charge of Muslim Affairs (2003– ): Minister for Community Development and Sports (2003–2004), Minister for Environment (2004–2006), Minister for Environment and Water Resources (2006–2011), Minister for Information, Communications and the Arts (2011–2012), Minister for Communications and Information (2012–2018).
- Yusof Ishak (1910–1970): journalist and co-founder of the Malay language newspaper Utusan Melayu; Yang di-Pertuan Negara of Singapore (head of state, 1963–1965 and 1965–1970); first President of Singapore (1959–1970).
- Rahayu Mahzam (1980-): MP for Jurong GRC (2015-) and Parliamentary Secretary for Health (2020–2022); Parliamentary Secretary for Communications and Information (2021–2022); Senior Parliamentary Secretary for Law (2022-), Senior Parliamentary Secretary for Health (2022-)
- Zaqy Mohamad (1974-): MP for the now-defunct Hong Kah GRC (2006–2011), Chua Chu Kang GRC (2011–2020), Marsiling-Yew Tee GRC (2020-); Minister of State for Manpower (2018–2020), Minister of State for National Development (2018–2020), Deputy Government Whip (2019–2020), Deputy Leader of the House (2020-), Senior Minister of State for Defence (2020-), Senior Minister of State for Manpower (2020-)
- Zhulkarnain Abdul Rahim (1980-): MP for Chua Chu Kang GRC (2020-)
- Dr Wan Rizal (1978- ): MP for Jalan Besar GRC (2020-)
- Mohamed Sharael Taha (1981- ): MP for Pasir Ris-Punggol GRC (2020-)
- Saktiandi Supaat (1973- ): MP for Bishan-Toa Payoh GRC (2015-)
- Nadia Ahmad Samdin (1990- ): MP for Ang Mo Kio GRC (2020-)
- Assoc Prof Muhammad Faishal Ibrahim (1968- ): MP for Marine Parade GRC (2006–2011), Nee Soon GRC (2011-); Parliamentary Secretary for the Ministry of Transport (2012–2015), Parliamentary Secretary for the Ministry of Health (2012–2015), Parliamentary Secretary for the Ministry of Education (2015–2017), Parliamentary Secretary for the Ministry of Social and Family Development (2015–2017), Senior Parliamentary Secretary for the Ministry of Education (2017–2020), Senior Parliamentary Secretary for the Ministry of Social and Family Development (2017–2020), Minister of State for the Ministry of National Development (2020-), Minister of State for the Ministry of Home Affairs (2020-)
- Mohd Fahmi Aliman (1972- ): MP for Marine Parade GRC (2020-); Mayor of the South East District (2020-)
- Maliki Osman (1965- ): MP for Sembawang GRC (2001–2011), MP for East Coast GRC (2011-); Parliamentary Secretary for the Ministry of Health (2004–2005), Parliamentary Secretary for the Ministry of Community Development, Youth and Sports (2004–2006), Parliamentary Secretary for the Ministry of National Development (2005–2010), Senior Parliamentary Secretary for the Ministry of National Development (2010–2013), Senior Parliamentary Secretary for the Ministry of Defence (2011–2013), Minister of State for the Ministry of National Development (2013–2015), Minister of State for the Ministry of Defence (2013–2015), Mayor of the South-East District (2011–2020), Senior Minister of State for the Ministry of Foreign Affairs (2015–2020), Senior Minister of State for the Ministry of Defence (2015–2020), Second Minister for Foreign Affairs (2020-), Second Minister for Education (2020-), Minister in the Prime Minister's Office (2020-)
- Masagos Zulkifli (1963- ): MP for Tampines GRC (2006-); Senior Parliamentary Secretary for the Ministry of Education (2006–2010), Senior Parliamentary Secretary for the Ministry of Home Affairs (2008–2010), Minister of State for the Ministry of Education (2010–2011), Minister of State for the Ministry of Home Affairs (2010–2012), Minister of State for the Ministry of Foreign Affairs (2011–2012), Senior Minister of State for the Ministry of Foreign Affairs (2012–2015), Senior Minister of State for the Ministry of Home Affairs (2012–2015), Second Minister for Foreign Affairs (2015), Second Minister for Home Affairs (2015), Minister for the Environment and Water Resources (2015–2020), Minister-in-charge of Muslim Affairs (2018-), Second Minister of Health (2020-), Minister of Social and Family Development (2020-)
- Mariam Jaafar (1977- ): MP for Sembawang GRC (2020-)
- Abbas Abu Amin: former MP for Pasir Panjang GRC
- Mohamed Ariff Suradi: former MP, 1959–1976
- Abdul Aziz Karim: former MP, 1968–1976

== Religion ==
- Sanusi Mahmood (1909–1995): first Mufti of Singapore.

== Sports ==
- Abdul Rahman: former national football captain who played in a record nine Malaysia Cup finals for Singapore, 1933–1950
- Ali Ahmad: first Singaporean to run the 100 yards in 10 seconds, 1940
- Abdullah Hamid: Olympian (hockey), 1956 Summer Olympics
- Abdul Halim bin Haron (1972– ): bodybuilder; winner of a silver medal at the Asian Championship in 2001 and a gold medal in the Busan 2002 Asian Games (bantamweight category); inducted into the Singapore Sports Council's Hall of Fame.
- Aqilah Binte Sudhir (1991– ): shooter; winner of a gold medal in the Commonwealth Youth Games 2008 (Girls' 10m air rifle event ), a bronze medal in the SEA Games 2009 (individual category of the Women 50m Rifle 3-Position), and a bronze and gold medal in the Commonwealth Games 2010 (individual and pairs category of the Women's 50m rifle 3-position).
- Azman bin Abdullah (1963– ): bodybuilder; five-time Mr Singapore title holder, three-time Mr Asia and an Asian Pro-Am Classic Champion; three-time winner of the SEA Games gold medal; first Singaporean to win a gold medal in the middleweight division of the IOC-sanctioned World Games Bodybuilding Championship (1993).
- Fandi Ahmad (1962– ): soccer player; Singapore National Team member (1979–1997); competed in three SEA Games; Public Service Medal; included in Madame Tussauds Singapore.
- Indra Sahdan Daud (1979– ): soccer player; captain of the Singapore National Team; plays for Geylang International.
- Ismail Marjan (1920–1991): badminton men's doubles player; winner at the International Badminton Championships in Glasgow (1952); winner of the Thomas Cup and All England Championship (1949–1955).
- Kamsari Salam (1941– ): cyclist; winner of the silver medal at the 1965 SEAP Games and bronze medal at the 1967 SEAP Games.
- Lon bin Mohamed Noor (1921–unknown): weightlifter; National Champion (1947–1956); winner of the bronze medal at the 1951 Asian Games; first Malay athlete from Singapore to participate in the Olympic Games where he finished 8th place out of 19 at the 1952 Olympic Games in Helsinki (bantamweight category).
- Mardan Mamat (1964– ): golfer; first Singaporean to win a European Tour event by winning the 2006 OSIM Singapore Masters Tournament.
- Noor Azhar Hamid (1949– ): high jumper; represented Singapore in nine consecutive SEAP/SEA Games (1967–1981) and won three gold medals (1969, 1973 and 1975), a silver and two bronze medals.
- Zainal Abidin Abdul Malek (1952– ): squash player; won Singapore's national title five times (1977–1986), East Asia title six times, and the Japan Open title for two consecutive years (1985 and 1986); won the Penang Open title by beating world champion Ross Norman of New Zealand in the finals (1989).
- Sunny Sultan: Pioneer of softball in Singapore and former national softball coach

== Sources ==
- Rasheed, Zainul Abidin; Saat, Norshahril (24 May 2016). Majulah!: 50 Years of Malay/Muslim Community in Singapore. World Scientific. ISBN 978-981-4759-89-2.
