= Bukit Panjang Government High School =

Secondary school in Choa Chu Kang, Singapore

Coordinates: 1°22′54″N 103°44′20″E

- 武吉班让政府中学; Sekolah Tinggi Pemerintah Bukit Panjang புக்கிட் பாஞ்சாங் அரசாங்க உயா் பள்ளி

Location
- 7 Choa Chu Kang Avenue 4, Singapore 689809; Choa Chu Kang, Singapore

Information
- Type: Government-aided; Co-educational; Autonomous
- Motto: Diligent in study and practice
- Established: 11 January 1960; 66 years ago
- Session: Single Session
- School code: 3204
- Principal: Seet Tiat Hee
- Colour: Red Green
- Website: bpghs.moe.edu.sg/

Bukit Panjang Government High School (BPGHS) is a co-educational government autonomous secondary school located in Choa Chu Kang, Singapore.

== History ==
BPGHS was formed in the 1960's with the merging of Bukit Panjang Secondary School and Chua Chu Kang Government Chinese Middle School into a single school building at Jalan Teck Whye. It was the first integrated government school in Singapore. The spirit of the school's beginning is described on the cover of the first school magazine: "Dominating the Bukit Panjang horizon are the twin peaks of Bukit Panjang—two peaks but one hill—symbolic of the integrated Chinese and English streams of education which work and play together as one in the valley below."

BPGHS, which was the first secondary school to be opened in the West Zone, was officially opened by Education Minister Yong Nyuk Lin on 11 January 1960. Sun Y-Chern was the first principal of the school. The first annual school sports meet was organised in 1960 and in the same year, the first batch of English stream students sat for their Cambridge School Certificate Examinations. The Chinese Stream Higher School Certificate classes were started in 1963 and the first batch of Chinese stream candidates sat for the Government Higher School Certificate and Government Secondary Four School Certificate Examinations in 1964.

In 1967, the School Advisory Committee was formed. The school continued to make great strides in the academic field. In 1970, the school obtained 93.6% passes in the Chinese School Certificate Exams — the highest among all integrated schools. The Chinese Higher School Certificate results were second only to that of National Junior College.

The ECA block was completed in June 1976 and was officially opened by Chai Chong Yi, Senior Minister of State for Education. In 1979, the school started an audio-corner and SELP classes to help students improve their English proficiency.

The school band also won the prestigious gold medal award and the Mace of Honour at the 1979 and 1983 Inter-School Band Competitions.

The school military band which was combined with Teck Whye Secondary School, separated into an individual band. The school band has since converted into a concert band. The band obtained an Accomplishment in the 2025 Singapore Youth Festival.

In the 1980s, English streams were adopted nationwide. BPGHS worked on improving the standard of English in the school, which seen by the percentage of GCE Ordinary Level passes in English increasing from below 50% to 98% in 1995. Education Minister Lee Yock Suan announced in 1993 that the school was one of the six schools to be granted autonomous status in 1994 and that it would be offering Higher Chinese and Higher Malay from 1995.

In 1993, the school moved from its old premises at Jalan Teck Whye to its present site at 7 Choa Chu Kang Avenue 4. The new school building was officially opened on 15 July 1995 by Low Seow Chay, Member of Parliament for Choa Chu Kang SMC. The school moved to a holding site between November 2006 and 2 January 2009 located at 38 Teck Whye Crescent as the campus at Choa Chu Kang was being upgraded under the Ministry of Education's PRIME scheme.

== School leaders ==
Name of Principal	Years Served
Mr. Suen Y-Chern	1960-1961
Mr. Yao Kwok Wah	1962-1966
Mr. Wee Teck Yam	1967-1974
Mr. Loo Pui Wah	1975-1978
Mr. Chan Tung Fong	1979-1981
Mr. Yar Yee Har	1981-1995
Mr. Lim Yam Meng	1996-1998
Ms. Tan Lay Choo	1999-2003
Mrs. Shirleen Ong-Chee Yan Hoon	2004-2007
Mr. Lee Seng Hai	2008-2011
Ms. Chan Wan Siong	2012-2017
Mr. Chua Lek Hong	2018-2023
Mr. Seet Tiat Hee	2024-present

== Notable alumni ==
- Masagos Zulkifli, Cabinet minister and member of parliament for Tampines GRC
- Sim Wong Hoo, founder and executive chairman of Creative Technology
- M. Nasir, singer-songwriter, musician and actor
- Saiyidah Aisyah, Olympic rower
- Cheng Li Hui, former Member of Parliament for Tampines GRC, 2015-2023
- Law Song Seng, former director and chief executive officer of the Institute of Technical Education
- Eelyn Kok, actress
- Shawn Lee, actor
- Seow Sin Nee, host and actress
- Yaw Shin Leong, former Member of Parliament for Hougang SMC, 2011-2012
