= Victoria School =

Victoria School 维多利亚学校 (Chinese) Sekolah Victoria (Malay) விக்டோரியா பள்ளி (Tamil)

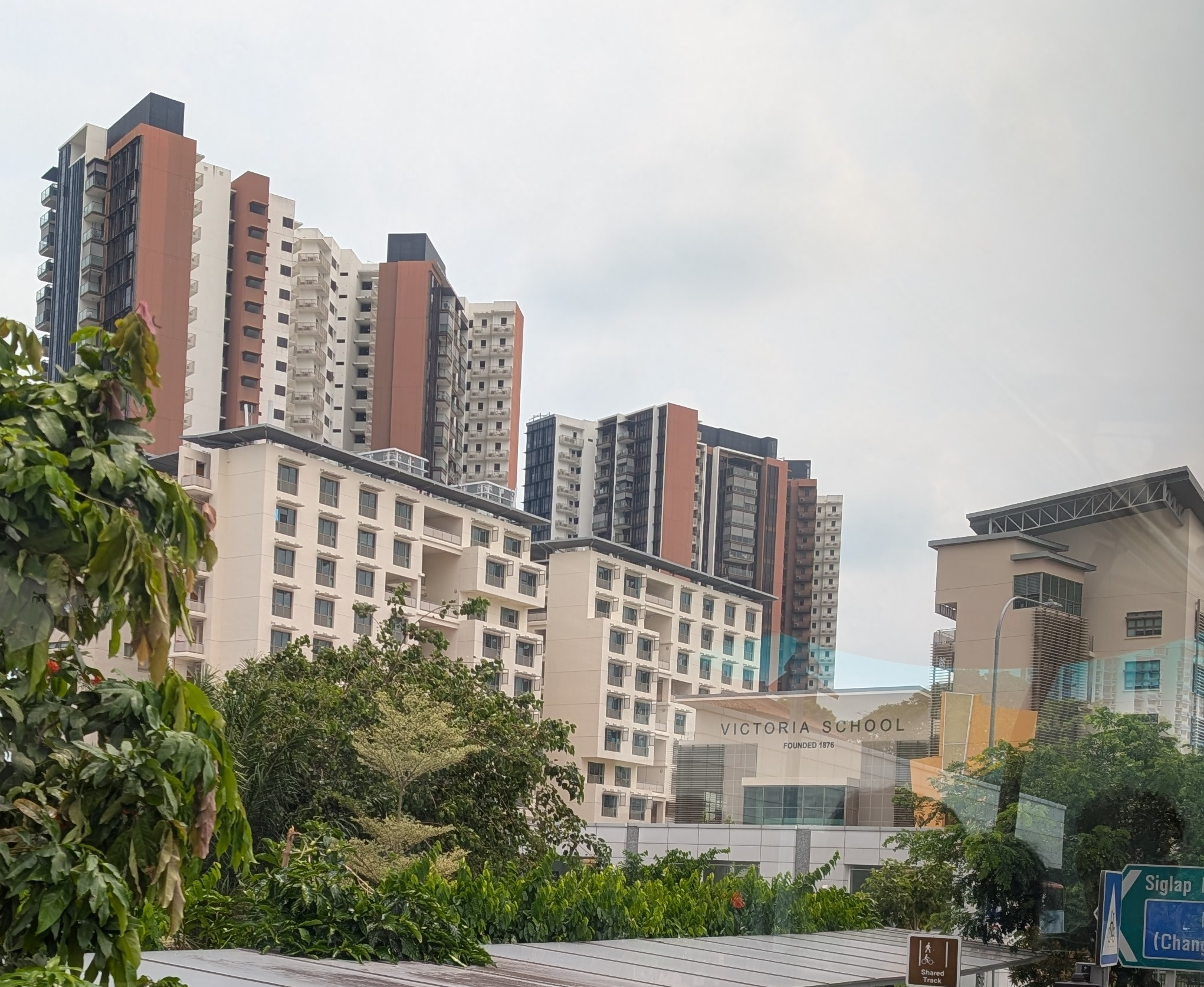

Location
- 2 Siglap Link, Bedok; East Region; 448880; Singapore; 1.308575°N 103.927467°E

Information
- Type: Government; Autonomous
- Motto: Latin: Nil Sine Labore (Nothing Without Labour)
- Established: 1876; 150 years ago
- Sister school: Cedar Girls' Secondary School
- Session: Single
- School code: 3014 (Express); 9151 (Integrated Programme)
- Principal: Low Chun Meng
- Gender: Boys
- Enrolment: 1,600+
- Campus size: 8.6 acres (3.5 ha)
- Colour: Red Yellow
- Song: Victoria Anthem
- Affiliation: Victoria Junior College
- Website: www.victoria.moe.edu.sg

Victoria School (VS) is a government autonomous boys' secondary school in Siglap, Singapore. Established in 1876, it is Singapore's second-oldest state secondary school.

It offers a six-year Integrated Programme. This allows students to skip the Singapore-Cambridge GCE Ordinary Level examinations and proceed to Victoria Junior College for Years 5 and 6. The Singapore-Cambridge GCE Advanced Level examinations are taken at the end of Year 6. The school includes a hostel.

== History ==
=== Kampong Glam: 1876-1900 ===
Victoria School began in 1876 as an English class for 12 Malay boys at Kampong Glam Malay Branch School. The first headmaster/principal was Y. A. Yzelman.

=== Syed Alwi: 1900-1933 ===
In 1900, Kampong Glam Malay Branch School merged with Kampong Glam Malay School and moved to Syed Alwi Road near the Victoria Bridge, so the school was renamed Victoria Bridge School. At the time, it was a feeder school for secondary schools, including Raffles Institution, then the only government secondary school in Singapore. In 1909, Victoria Bridge School added classes for Standard Five to alleviate the enrolment pressure at Raffles Institution. In 1931, it became the second government secondary school in Singapore.

Many students left school at age 13, so from 1930 to 1952, the school operated an afternoon session for continuing education. The school uniform was introduced in 1929, and a school library was opened in December 1929 with the aid of businessman Syed Ahmed bin Mohamed Alsagoff. During this period, school games were formalised, with the first annual sports meet being held in 1915. The first annual Speech Day was held in 1916, and the first annual academic prizes were awarded. The house system was instituted in 1929, while the house prefect system began in 1930. The first Boy Scouts troop was formed in 1919,

When Victoria Bridge School was at Syed Alwi Road, the school had a recommended maximum enrolment of 560. However, by 1925, it had 705 students. Victoria Bridge School's campus at Syed Alwi Road is depicted on the back of the S$2 banknote in the current series.

=== Tyrwhitt Road: 1933–1984 ===
In 1933, Victoria Bridge School moved to Tyrwhitt Road and changed its name to its current name, Victoria School. In 1935, the primary classes were phased out, and the school became a district secondary school. The school motto, Nil Sine Labore (Latin for "nothing without labour"), was adopted before World War II.

During the Japanese occupation of Singapore between 1942 and 1945, Victoria School continued operating as a Japanese school called Jalan Besar Boys' School. Following the end of the war, Victoria School reopened with 16 pupils on 1 October 1945 as one of the first schools in Singapore to resume classes. It was housed at the Kampong Glam Malay School site until May 1946, since the Tyrwhitt Road building was used as a hospital. Under the headmaster R. F. Bomford's leadership, a science block was constructed for the school. At the time, Victoria School had the best school laboratories in Singapore, attracting students from Raffles Girls' School and St. Andrew's School to take science lessons at Victoria School. It was also selected as Singapore's pioneer school for audio-visual education.

Post-School Certificate (now the Singapore-Cambridge GCE Advanced Level) classes began in 1951 and included the first girls to attend the school. In 1955, the school achieved the best results in Singapore in the examinations for the Cambridge Overseas School Certificate (present-day Singapore-Cambridge GCE Ordinary Level), with a 99.5% pass rate. In 1957, it had the best results in Singapore for the University Entrance Examinations. In 1969, after Singapore introduced the junior college system, Victoria School started offering three-year pre-university courses in 1979.

The school building was designed by Frank Dorrington Ward, the chief architect of the Public Works Department who also designed the Supreme Court Building and other prominent landmarks in Singapore. It was upgraded in 1966 and gazetted for conservation by the Urban Redevelopment Authority (URA) in 2007. It is one of the few early city-centre schools still in existence and features two school buildings from the pre- and post-war period on a single site. The hall-and-canteen block is the only known school hall left of this style and configuration in Singapore. The site was awarded the URA Heritage Award in 2009. It is a marked-out historical landmark of the Jalan Besar Heritage Trail. It became the headquarters of the People's Association (PA) in 2010. A Victoria School Boy bronze statue is located at the PA.

=== Geylang Bahru: 1984–2003 ===
In 1984, Victoria School moved to 3 Geylang Bahru Lane. The new site's move was marked with a 2.3 km march by 1,500 present and former students, teachers, and principals from Tyrwhitt Road, led by Abbas Abu Amin, Member of Parliament for Pasir Panjang GRC who was an alumnus of Victoria School. Students preferred the junior colleges to the pre-university programme, so Victoria Junior College was established that year as a separate institution and the school ended its pre-university intake, with the last group of students sitting for the Singapore-Cambridge GCE Advanced Level examinations in November 1985.

The school began offering the Art Elective Programme in 1985 and set up its first computer laboratory in 1986. The first Victoria Challenge was inaugurated in 1987, and the Victorian Profile began in 1991.

In 1989, Victoria School was one of a small number of schools chosen to receive overseas scholars from the ASEAN countries. After the introduction of national ranking by the Ministry of Education in 1992, the school placed in the top ten in four years of that decade. The school became the seventh Gifted Education Programme centre in 2001 and hosted the programme until 2005.

Single-session schooling began in 1992 after the extension of the school building the previous year. The school opted to remain a government school and not become independent; it was selected to become one of the first six autonomous schools in 1994.

=== Siglap Link: 2003–present ===
The campus at Siglap Link off Marine Parade Road opened in 2003, incorporating a hostel. It was designed on ecological principles to reflect the school's values, with roofs curved like an open book and the school centred on the library. At its opening, it had the largest government secondary school library in Singapore. The campus was selected to participate in the 9th International Architecture Exhibition in Venice. The ceremonial procession to the new campus was attended by President S. R. Nathan, who was an alumnus of Victoria School.

In 2008, Victoria School became the first school in Singapore to offer Physical Education as a subject examinable at the Singapore-Cambridge GCE Ordinary Level. It also became one of the first four secondary schools to offer the Regional Studies Programme, and the only one offering Bahasa Indonesia.

The school began offering the six-year Integrated Programme through the Victoria-Cedar Alliance, together with Cedar Girls' Secondary School and Victoria Junior College, in 2012.

== Campus and facilities ==
The Victoria School campus covers 3.5 hectares (8.6 acres). Between the classroom block and the science block, the "Eco-Street," planted with tropical vegetation and houses fish and turtles, forms a central artery providing natural light and ventilation to the classrooms and a setting for outdoor learning. The Victoria Pool, Learning Garden, Bio Pod, and Exploration Patch represent a move away from rigidly-structured, classroom-based instruction.

The ground-level classrooms, known as Learning Studios (consisting of the Gentlemen, Professional, and Sportsmen rooms), are air-conditioned and have sliding doors that open out to the landscape. Some classrooms on the upper floors have balconies, which were originally intended to take advantage of the sea view, but these are closed for safety reasons, and the Indoor Sports Hall and the Condominium Seaside Residences now block most of the view.

The school facilities also include a 500-seater auditorium and a three-storey library, of which the third floor is reserved for teachers and contains a collection of teaching resources.

=== Victoria Hall ===
Victoria Hall is a hostel consisting of two 11-storey blocks (one male and one female) within the school compound. It is next to the sea and East Coast Park, giving boarders both a sea view and access to the park's sporting facilities. It houses about 500 boarders of several nationalities, including Vietnamese, Thai, and Chinese, many of whom attend either Victoria School or Victoria Junior College. Secondary/Year 3 students also stay at the hostel for six weeks. Three classes attend this programme in Term 1, four classes in Term 2, and three classes in Term 3.

=== Sports facilities ===
A S$500,000 AstroTurf field replaced the conventional field in early 2007.

The Indoor Sports Hall (ISH) was completed in June 2009. It consists of two storeys, but the building's height is approximately four storeys because of the high ceiling.

The school also has an air rifle range, a tennis and basketball court, a fitness corner, and a gymnasium.

=== Computer facilities ===
The school is mostly covered by a Wi-Fi network (SWN) provided by the Ministry of Education for the use of teachers and students. There is also another separate Wi-Fi network for the students' Personal Learning Devices (PLD).

== Culture and tradition ==
=== Vision ===
Every Victorian is a Gentleman, Sportsman and Leader.

=== Mission ===
Every Victorian to lead and serve his family, community and country.

=== Values ===
Victorians are to follow the STRIVE values, which stand for (S)Service, (T)Tenacity, (R)Responsibility, (I)Integrity, (V)Vision, and (E)Empathy.

=== Uniform ===
The school uniform consists of a white short-sleeved shirt, with either khaki short trousers (for Year 1 and 2 students) or white long trousers (for Year 3 and 4 students). A 'VICTORIA' label is sewn on the back pockets of the trousers. Secondary 3 and 4 students wear a black school belt. The school socks are white with the initials 'VS' in red on both sides, although plain white socks are allowed. Shoes have to be at least 80% white. In 2005, an official 'Victoria School' shoe with the letters 'VS' on each side was introduced.

Students wear a maroon striped tie every Monday and on formal occasions, sometimes with a maroon blazer as well. The school badge is worn above the left chest pocket. Student bodies such as the Prefects' Council and Monitors' Council have their own badges, but the school crest remains their main feature.

For physical activities and camps, students wear a bright yellow 'bumblebee' T-shirt with a pair of black shorts and white socks with sports shoes. The word 'VICTORIAN' is printed on the back of the PE T-shirt.

=== House system ===
The students are grouped into five houses, namely Glam (red), Kallang (blue), Kapor (green), Rochore (yellow), and Whampoa (purple), which compete against each other in the school's annual Sports Day, Cross-Country Championships, Track and Field Championships and during Inter-house games and since 2019, Project APEX.

=== Victorian Spirit ===
The Victorian Spirit is a sense of pride and belonging to the school, a fighting spirit, and striving to be their best.

== Special programmes ==
Victoria School offers the Integrated Programme, GCE Ordinary Level Physical Education Programme, Art Elective Programme, Regional Studies Programme, and Higher Mother Tongue Languages in Chinese, Malay, and Tamil. VS students may also enrol in the Music Elective Programme in Secondary Three or a third language (French, German or Japanese). However, these lessons are held at external venues. Students of foreign languages take part in the Ministry of Education Language Centre's month-long Study-cum-Immersion Programmes (SCIP) in countries such as France, Germany, and Japan.

=== Victoria-Cedar Alliance Integrated Programme ===
The Victoria-Cedar Alliance Integrated Programme is a six-year Integrated Programme that allows students to bypass the Singapore-Cambridge GCE Ordinary Level examinations and proceed directly to the Singapore-Cambridge GCE Advanced Level examinations at the end of the sixth year. Under this programme, students complete their four-year secondary education in Victoria School before moving to Victoria Junior College for Years 5 and 6 for pre-university education.

Victoria School started offering the Integrated Programme together with Cedar Girls' Secondary School and Victoria Junior College in 2012, building upon the success of the original four-year Victoria Integrated Programme started by Victoria Junior College in 2005.

=== GCE Physical education ===
In 2008, Victoria School became the first school in Singapore to offer Physical Education (PE) as an examinable subject at the GCE Ordinary Level after receiving the approval of the Ministry of Education in 2006. The course involves theoretical and practical aspects, including weight training, football, hockey, and cross-country running, among others.

Students take the theory examination at the end of the course (i.e., November of the graduating year). This examination contributes 40% of their overall grade, the other 60% coming from the practical component, assessed over a period of time.

To better acquaint students with the style of GCE Ordinary Level PE lessons, PE theory lessons are also conducted in lower secondary classes as an examinable subject. The selection process for GCE Ordinary Level PE candidates is carried out towards the end of secondary two. Students whose applications have been approved by the PE Department are notified before the subject combination allocation process at the end of the school year.

=== Art Elective Programme ===
The Art Elective Programme (AEP) leads to the GCE Ordinary Level Higher Art examination. The AEP is offered to academically good students with talent in art. For lower secondary classes, the AEP class is not entirely made up of AEP students. Usually, about a third of the class will take AEP lessons, while the other two-thirds will have Home Economics or Design & Technology lessons. For upper secondary classes, AEP lessons are conducted after normal school hours.

=== Regional Studies Programme ===
Students in the Regional Studies Programme (RSP) learn about Southeast Asian culture and contemporary society. The curriculum includes overseas immersion programmes and structured enrichment modules spread throughout the course. Other schools in Singapore that have the Regional Studies Programme offer Malay as a third language (MSP), but since the Singapore Indonesian School is situated opposite Victoria School's campus at Siglap, students in the RSP programme take Indonesian as a third language, also known as Bahasa Indonesia (BI).

=== VECTORS ===
VECTORS is a school-based talent programme aimed at nurturing students who demonstrate high abilities in mathematics and science. Students are given a wide range of opportunities to learn beyond the curriculum, including enrichment modules at junior colleges, polytechnics and universities, research mentorships, and other institutions.

== Co-curricular activities ==
The school offers students 40 co-curricular activities (CCAs) in the four areas of sports, uniformed groups, performing arts, and clubs and societies.

The school holds performing arts and sporting activities, including the biennial Rhapsody, Drama Festival (Dramafest), Musical World, Arts Festival, and Evening of Music and Drama (EMD), the annual Sports Day and Cross-Country Championship.

=== Sports ===
12 sports are offered in Victoria School: Badminton, Cricket, Cross-country, Floorball, Football, hockey, sailing, Table-Tennis, Tennis, Track & Field, Volleyball and Wushu. Cricket and NCC (Sea) has officially stopped taking in new members since 2026. The school's NCC (Sea) also participates in the Inter-School Dragon Boat competition. Between 2009 and 2026, the school won 44 national team titles and 33 zonal team titles at the National Schools Games and achieved a national top-four placing 236 times. VS students have won six Singapore National Olympic Council Best Sportsboy/Team Awards and 24 Singapore Schools Sports Council Best School Boy Awards for sports.

Ten Victorians have represented Singapore at the Olympics - four in hockey, three in athletics, two in sailing and one in water polo.

=== Uniformed groups ===
Victoria School has six uniform groups: four national and two worldwide. They offer Secondary 2-3 students a combined cultural exchange trip overseas to places such as Perth and Hong Kong. All have won the best unit competitions in the 21st century.

- Boys' Brigade: J M Fraser Award for Excellence - 20th consecutive gold, 2017
- National Police Cadet Corps: NPCC Unit Overall Proficiency Award - 18th consecutive gold, 2017
- National Cadet Corps (Land): Best Unit Competition - silver, 2016
- Scouts - Arrow Scout Group: Frank Cooper Sands Award - 15th consecutive gold, 2019
- Red Cross: Red Cross Youth Excellent Unit Award - 9th consecutive gold, 2016
- National Cadet Corps (Sea): Best Unit Competition - gold, 2016. However, NCC Sea has stopped taking in members since 2026.

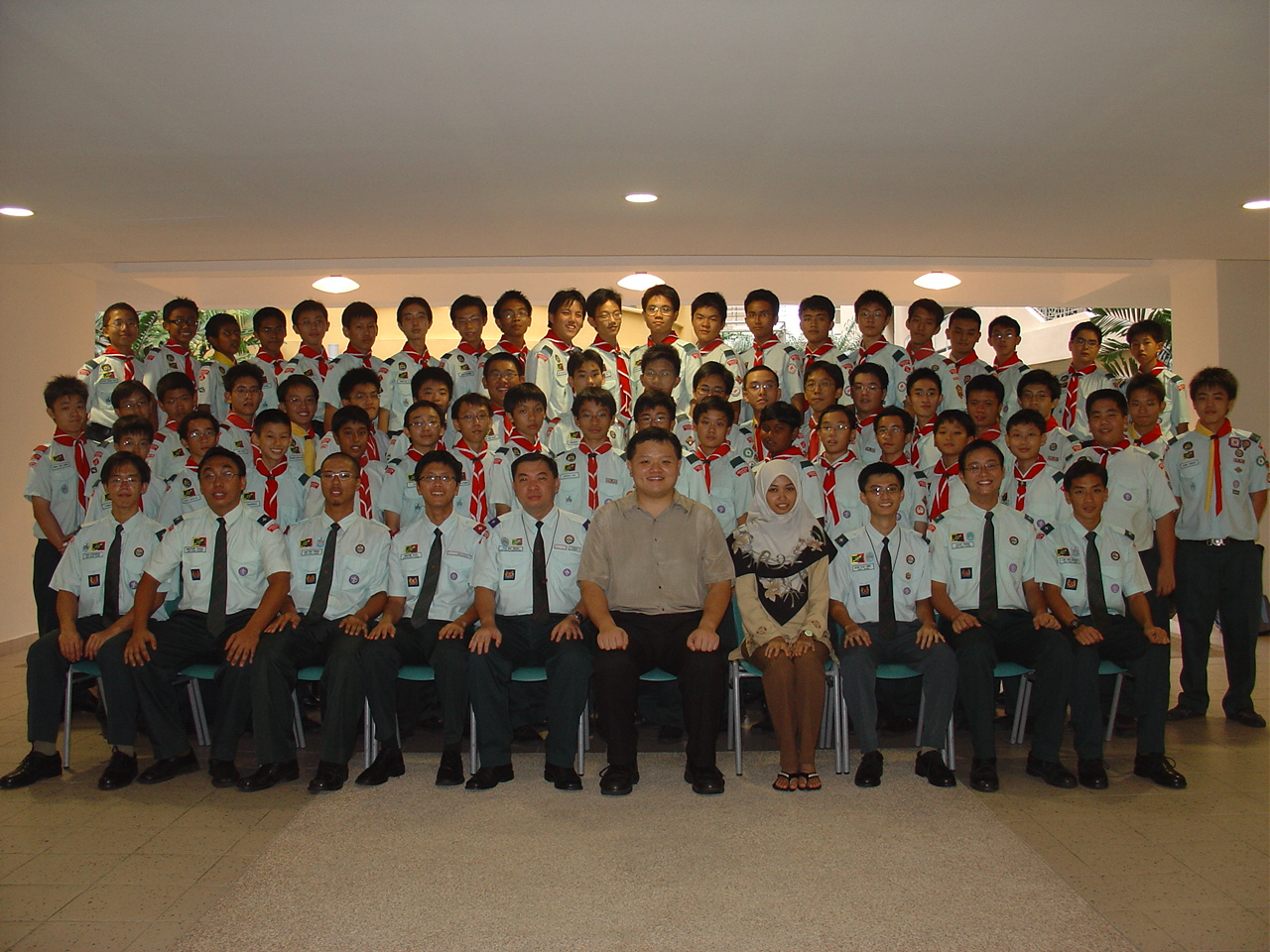
Passing Over Ceremony at Victoria School, circa 2005

Scouting was first started in Victoria Bridge School (present-day Victoria School) when the 5th Singapore (HQ Malay) Troop was formed on 28 March 1919. The 5th Troop was mentioned in the local newspaper in August 1950, but appears to have been disbanded shortly after. The 6th Troop was founded in 1922, when school-based Scouting was introduced in government schools. In 1932, the 6th Troop was renamed Arrow Scout Group after the Golden Arrow, which BP had proclaimed in 1929's 3rd World Scout Jamboree as Scouting's symbol of peace and goodwill.

=== Performing arts ===
- Concert Band
- Chinese Orchestra
- Choir
- Photography Club
- English Drama

==== Chinese orchestra ====
Victoria School Chinese Orchestra is one of the top school Chinese orchestras in Singapore. In the biennial Singapore Youth Festival (SYF) Arts Presentation, Victoria School Chinese Orchestra has always attained the Certificate of Distinction.

==== Choir ====
Victoria School Choir is one of the school choirs in Singapore. In the Singapore Youth Festival Choral Judging Competition, the school has always attained a Gold with the Honours award. It has also won gold medals in international choir competitions. In the 2012 National Day Parade, the 300-strong Combined School Choir was formed by students from Victoria School and Cedar Girls' Secondary School.

=== Clubs and societies ===
- AV Club
- Chess Club (consisting of the International Chess Club and the Chinese Chess Club)
- English Language Drama Club
- Debate and Oratorical Society
- Infocomm Club

==== Infocomm ====
Victoria School's Infocomm Club participates in national competitions like the National Youth Media Competition, holding Singapore's best record; champions twice, runners-up three times since 2005. Activities include coding, robotics, and media production, supporting the school's digital initiatives.

In The Straits Times National Youth Media Competition, Victoria School holds the best record among all the schools in Singapore, clinching the championship twice and runner-up position three times since the competition was inaugurated in 2005.

== Community involvement programmes ==
=== Youth Day ===
On Youth Day, Victoria School boys attempt to 'paint the town yellow' as they go round nearby housing blocks in the neighbourhood collecting old newspapers and items for disposal. The boys are clad in their yellow PT attire so that they are easily identified.

=== President's Challenge ===
Victoria School participates in the President's Challenge every year. In 2004, each class did a specific activity to raise funds for the charity. Activities included washing cars, going door-to-door to do household chores for a donation. In 2005, the school held a watch design competition, and the best designs were made into real watches and put on sale. In 2006, booklets were sold containing art by past and present Victorians.

=== Victoria Challenge ===
Started in July 1987, the Victoria Challenge, conducted every four years, allows classes to identify tasks that will contribute to the school. The "challenge" itself is for classes to carefully plan their task and pledge to complete it within 24 hours. Special T-shirts have been designed for every Victoria Challenge since its inception. Past challenges have included creating miniature clay figurines, folding 3D origami eagles to hang in the library, drawing floor murals, and creating an "Arts Nook" in the corner of the school, complete with books and a piano. The latest Victoria Challenge was held from 23 June 2023 to 24 June 2023.

== Overseas exchange programmes ==
Victoria School has established ties with schools abroad to promote Singaporean education and exchange ideas.

As part of the initiative to improve bilateral education links between Singapore and Malaysia, Victoria School has been linked up with Penang Free School, Malaysia, by the Ministry of Education. Other schools with which Victoria School has bilateral exchange programmes include Hebei Baoding Yizhong, English School Attached to Guangdong University of Foreign Studies, Beijing Sanfan Zhongxue and Nan Hai Zhi Xin Zhongxue (all in the People's Republic of China), Modern School of Vasant Vihar (India), University of Griffith (Australia) and Sultan Omar Ali Saiffudin High School (Brunei).

== Humanities trips ==
Victoria School offers week-long overseas humanities trips to ASEAN and other parts of Asia for secondary 1 to 3 students to increase awareness of other cultures and relate lessons to the real world. These have included a trip to Vietnam in 2019.

== Camps ==
=== Secondary One bonding camp ===
During January, all secondary one Victorians attend a three-day, two-night camp, usually held at the school, where they participate in physical, interactive, and character-building activities designed to help them make new friends and adapt to the new secondary school environment. It is facilitated by some of the secondary three and secondary four seniors.

=== Secondary Three overseas adventure camp ===
In 2001, Victoria School became the first school in Singapore to send its entire secondary three students to an overseas camp. The camp, which used to be held typically in March, is now held in January concurrently with the secondary one and two cohort camps on Malaysia's farmland. The aim is to bond the new secondary three students and help them settle into their new classes after being streamed according to their subject combinations and expose them to life outside the confines of urban Singapore. Also, following the "EDGE" model of the school, the camp aims to "Grow" (Third letter of the acronym) the students into effective leaders as they will take over various leadership roles from the secondary four students. Rigorous activities, including rafting, trekking, river-crossing, and mountain-climbing, are held during the camp. From 2001 to 2010, the camp was held at Kahang Organic Rice Eco-Farm, Kahang town, located near Kluang, Johor. From 2011, the annual camp location was shifted to Tanjong Sutera Resort, Tanjung Sedili, near the town of Kota Tinggi, Johor.

=== Victoria Enhanced Leadership/Outdoor Camp Instructor Training Camp (VELOCI-T) ===
The VELOCI-T is a 5-day outdoor camp that begins locally and continues overseas. External camp instructors run it in collaboration with selected Secondary Three junior leaders for that year. It has garnered praise for being one of the most difficult and effective leadership camps among local institutions. 100 Secondary Two students, nominated through CCA teachers and who will undertake leadership positions the following year, undergo rugged adventure activities, are trained to run camps, and conduct activities commonly carried out during outdoor camps, and learn the Five Practices of Exemplary Leadership through hands-on activities. Trainees have made an expedition on inflatable rafts and kayaks and climbed Gunung Arong. After the camp is concluded, the participants' performances are reviewed. Those who pass are promoted to Junior Leader (JL) or, upon further application and stringent selection, Senior Leader (SL). The JLs and SLs are informally called Red Shirts and Black Shirts after the shirts are awarded. They form the backbone of student leadership in VS and play an instrumental role in rallying and organising the student population.

== Awards ==
In 2009, Victoria School was awarded the Ministry of Education's School Distinction Award (SDA).

Victoria School has also attained various CCA awards, such as the Sustained Achievement Awards for sports, performing arts, and uniformed groups in recognition of its consistently high performance in national competitions, sports meets, the biennial Singapore Youth Festival and other events.

== Victoria Advisory Committee ==
The Victoria Advisory Committee (VAC), formed in 1968, set the direction and advice on the future of Victoria School and Victoria Junior College. The principals of VS and VJC and the President of the Old Victorians' Association sit on the committee.

== Victoria Chorale ==
Formed in 1988, the chorale comprises Victoria School and Victoria Junior College's graduates.

== Alumni ==
=== Old Victorians' Association ===
The alumni body, Old Victorians' Association (OVA), was established in 1941. It serves as a channel for former students of Victoria School and Victoria Junior College to associate with their alma mater. The OVA supports the schools' activities, assists needy students, and promotes sports, social and cultural activities among association members. Previously, alumni returned on Victorians' Day, the first Saturday of March, to play games, eat school canteen food again and catch up with long-time schoolmates.

The OVA men's and women's hockey teams play in the Singapore Hockey Federation hockey leagues.

In 2009, OVA organized the inaugural combined VS and VJC gala concert, with a 260-strong cast comprising both students and celebrity alumni, at the Esplanade Concert Hall.

In 2011 and 2016, OVA organised the Victoria School 135th and 140th Anniversary Celebration Dinners at Tyrwhitt Road's former VS campus.

=== Notable alumni ===
Presidents of Singapore

- Yusof Ishak, first President of Singapore
- Devan Nair, third President of Singapore
- S. R. Nathan, sixth President of Singapore

Politics

Ministers and Members of Parliament

- Abbas Abu Amin, former Member of Parliament; former chairman, Football Association of Singapore
- Abdul Aziz Karim, former Member of Parliament
- S. Dhanabalan, former cabinet minister and former Member of Parliament
- Fadli Fawzi, Member of Parliament for Aljunied GRC
- Andy Gan, former Member of Parliament
- Lim Biow Chuan, former Deputy Speaker of Parliament and former Member of Parliament
- S. V. Lingam, former Member of Parliament
- Mohamed Ariff Suradi, former Member of Parliament
- David Neo, Minister for Culture, Community and Youth, Senior Minister of State for Education and Member of Parliament for Tampines GRC; former Chief of Army, Singapore Armed Forces
- Ong Chit Chung, former Senior Parliamentary Secretary and former Member of Parliament
- Sha'ari Tadin, former Senior Parliamentary Secretary and former Member of Parliament
- Sharael Taha, Member of Parliament for Pasir Ris-Changi GRC
- Sheng Nam Chin, former Parliamentary Secretary and former Member of Parliament
- Peter Sung, former Minister of State and former Member of Parliament
- Teo Ser Luck, former Minister of State and former Member of Parliament
- Wee Toon Boon, former Acting Minister and former Member of Parliament
- Alex Yeo, Member of Parliament for Potong Pasir SMC

Nominated Members of Parliament

- Ngiam Tee Liang, social work academic and former Nominated Member of Parliament
- Kanwaljit Soin, first female orthopaedic surgeon of Singapore and first female Nominated Member of Parliament
- Thomas Thomas, trade unionist and former Nominated Member of Parliament

Other politicians

- Abdul Samad Ismail, leading Malay political activist in the 1950s and 60s, and founding member of People's Action Party
- Aziz Ishak, former Malaysian cabinet minister
- Eu Chooi Yip, leader of the underground communist movement in Singapore
- Isa Ibrahim, Bruneian cabinet minister; former Speaker, Legislative Council of Brunei
- Sardon Jubir, former Malaysian cabinet minister and former Governor of Penang, Malaysia
- Zaini Ahmad, Bruneian nationalist activist and one of the leaders of the Brunei revolt

Civil service

- Chiang Chie Foo, former Permanent Secretary
- Han Cheng Fong, former Permanent Secretary
- Phay Seng Whatt, former chairman of the Public Service Commission

Military/Police

- How Kwang Hwee, Commissioner of Police
- Neo Kian Hong, sixth Chief of Defence Force, former Permanent Secretary
- Ng Chee Khern, former Chief of Air Force, former Permanent Secretary
- Ng Yat Chung, fifth Chief of Defence Force
- Sulaiman Sujak, first non-British Chief of the Royal Malaysian Air Force
- Syed Mohamed bin Ahmad Alsagoff, commander of the Malaysian Armed Forces in Singapore, 1963–1965
- Tee Tua Ba, former Commissioner of Police

Legal

- Ahmad Mohamed Ibrahim, former Attorney-General of Singapore
- Koh Eng Tian, former Solicitor-General of Singapore

Medicine

- Chew Chin Hin, medical practitioner and the first and only Singaporean recipient of a Mastership in the American College of Physicians
- Kanagaratnam Shanmugaratnam, histopathologist and Singapore's "father of pathology"

Education

- Law Song Seng, first and longest-serving chief executive officer of the Institute of Technical Education
- Po'ad bin Shaik Abu Bakar Mattar, Pro-Chancellor of the National University of Singapore
- Edwin Thumboo, first dean of the Faculty of Arts and Social Sciences, National University of Singapore; Cultural Medallion (Literature) winner, 1979

Business

- Mohamed Salleh Marican, founder, Second Chance Properties
- Quek Leng Chan, co-founder, Hong Leong Group Malaysia; second richest person in Malaysia
- G. Ramachandran, the longest-serving president of the Singapore Indian Chamber of Commerce and Industry

Religion

- Nazirudin Mohd Nasir, fourth mufti of Singapore
- Sanusi Mahmood, first mufti of Singapore
- Sik Kwang Sheng, abbot of Kong Meng San Phor Kark See Monastery and former president of the Singapore Buddhist Federation

Sports

- Abdul Rahman, former national football captain who played in a record nine Malaysia Cup finals for Singapore, 1933-1950
- Ali Ahmad, first Singaporean to run the 100 yards in 10 seconds, 1940
- Choo Seng Quee, former national football coach and the only person who had coached the national teams of Singapore, Malaysia and Indonesia; Singapore national Coach of the Year, 1978
- N. Ganesan, former chairman of the Football Association of Singapore
- Kampton Kam, national track and field athlete; national record holder for high jump, 2025 and high jump (indoor), 2023
- Lau Teng Chuan, former secretary-general of the Singapore National Olympic Council
- Gavin Lee: national football coach; youngest football coach in the Singapore Premier League at the age of 28, 2019
- Zac Leow, para-athlete who holds the world marathon record for para-athletics, 2023
- Stacey Muruthi, former national cricket captain who holds the record for playing 45 consecutive years in the Singapore Cricket Association (SCA) league, 1968-2012
- Calvin Quek, national track and field athlete; national record holder for 400 metre hurdles, 2025, 4 x 400 metres relay, 2023 and 4 x 400 metres relay (mixed), 2021
- Song Koon Poh, former national rugby captain and the only team player to have won the Singapore national Sportsman of the Year award, 1979
- Lance Tan, former national track and field athlete and former national track cyclist; national record holder for team sprint and team pursuit, 2017
- Tan Xiang Tian, world champion (xingyiquan), 2015 World Wushu Championships

Olympians

- Abdullah Hamid, Olympian (hockey), 1956 Summer Olympics
- Gan Eng Teck, Olympian (water polo), 1956 Summer Olympics
- William Douglas Hay, Olympian (hockey), 1956 Summer Olympics
- S. Jeyathurai, Olympian (hockey), 1956 Summer Olympics
- Calvin Kang, Olympian (athletics), 2008 Summer Olympics; national record holder for 4 x 100 metres relay, 2015
- Ryan Lo, Olympian (sailing), 2020 and 2024 Summer Olympics
- Kesavan Soon, Olympian (athletics), 1956 Summer Olympics
- Tan Wearn Haw, Olympian (sailing), 2000 Summer Olympics; youngest person to helm a national sports association in Singapore at the age of 31, 2011
- Gary Yeo, Olympian (athletics), 2012 Summer Olympics; national record holder for 4 x 100 metres relay, 2015 and 60 m (indoor), 2012
- Arumugam Vijiaratnam, Olympian (hockey), 1956 Summer Olympics; only Singaporean who had represented Singapore in four sports - hockey, football, cricket and rugby; first Pro-Chancellor, Nanyang Technological University

Arts

- A. Samad Said, national leaurate, Malaysia
- Iskandar Jalil, ceramist; Cultural Medallion (Art) winner, 1988
- Sonny Liew, comic artist and illustrator; only Singaporean to have won the Eisner Award
- Charlie Lim, singer-songwriter who wrote, performed and produced the theme songs for Singapore National Day Parade (NDP) 2018, 2020, 2021 and 2025
- David Lim, music educator; Cultural Medallion (Music) winner, 1979
- T. Sasitharan, theatre practitioner and educator; Cultural Medallion (Theatre) winner, 2012
- Tan Swee Leong, radio and television personality who was a household name from the 1960s to 1980s
- Kelvin Tong, film director; first Singaporean to direct a Hollywood film
- Daniel Yun, film producer; co-produced and co-directed 1965, a film to commemorate fifty years of Singapore's independence

Others

- Pav Gill, whistleblower who uncovered the Wirecard scandal, one of the largest corporate frauds in history
- Anthony Yeo, counsellor and Singapore's "father of counselling"

Queen's, State and President's Scholars

Name	Scholarship	Year
Ahmad Mohamed Ibrahim	Queen's Scholarship	1936
Poh Soo Jin	Queen's Scholarship	1951
Teh Ee Kheng	Queen's Scholarship	1957
Yap Choon Teck	Queen's Scholarship	1957
Si Hoe Sing Yin	Queen's Scholarship	1958
Han Cheng Fong	State Scholarship	1962
Lam Chuan Leong	President's Scholarship	1967
Ng Chee Khern	President's Scholarship	1984
Loh Wai Keong	President's Scholarship	1984
Siow Mein Yeak	President's Scholarship	2019

== See also ==
- Education in Singapore
