= Ali bin Ahmad =

Singaporean sprinter (born 1924)

Ali Ahmad
Personal information
- Full name: Ali bin Ahmad
- Nationality: Singaporean
- Born: 1 January 1924 Singapore
- Died: Singapore

Sport
- Sport: Athletics

Ali bin Ahmad (born 1 January 1924) is a Singaporean sprinter and sprinting coach.

In 1940, Ali became the first Singaporean to run the 100 yards in 10 seconds, when still a schoolboy at Victoria School and his name appeared in the Hall of Fame. The timing also equalled the Malayan record.

Ali later became a coach with the Singapore Amateur Athletic Association, coaching Singapore's top sprinters from the 1950s to the 1990s. His proteges include Olympian Kesavan Soon, two-time Olympian C. Kunalan, Tang Ngai Kin, Harun Mundir and Mona Kunalan.

== See also ==
- Kesavan Soon
