= Anthony Yeo =

Singaporean counsellor

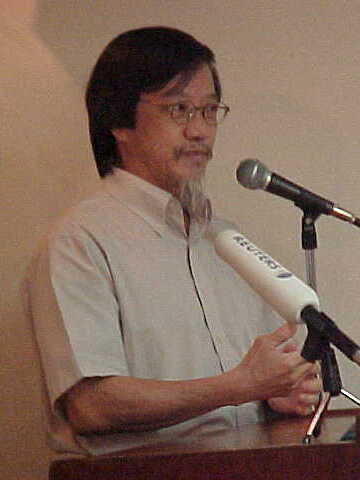
- Yeo in 2005
- Education: University of Singapore
- Years active: 1972–2009
- Known for: "Father of Counselling" in Singapore
- Awards: Special recognition award (posthumous) by the National Volunteer and Philanthropy Centre

Anthony Yeo was a Singaporean counsellor, hailed as Singapore's "father of counselling" for his pioneering role in the profession's development in Singapore.

Yeo attended Victoria School and graduated from the University of Singapore in 1972. He later founded and served as clinical director of the Counselling and Care Centre, Singapore's first counselling centre; he also helped to establish a suicide prevention agency, Samaritans of Singapore (SOS). Yeo was a regular contributor to The Straits Times, including as an advice columnist. He admitted that at one point of his life, he flunked his exams so regularly that he was dropped from three primary schools, and even failed his O-levels twice. He later found his life path of giving and passion for helping others that empowered him for the rest of his life.

He died on 20 June 2009, of Burkitt's lymphoma, after he collapsed at home on the evening of 9 May.

On 21 November 2009, a special posthumous recognition award was given to Yeo by the National Volunteer and Philanthropy Centre (NVPC). The award, nominated by Christine Wong, executive director of Samaritans of Singapore, honoured Yeo's lifetime of voluntarism since 1972, serving in various positions in the social work fraternity and eventually as the first Asian director of the non-profit Counselling and Care Centre.

== Selected bibliography ==
- Counselling: A Problem-Solving Approach
- Living with Stress, which was also published in a Malay edition.
- If Tomorrow Never Comes
