= Koh Eng Tian =

Former Solicitor-General of Singapore

Koh Eng Tian SC

Solicitor-General of Singapore
- In office 1981 – December 1991

Personal details
- Born: Singapore
- Education: University of Malaya
- Occupation: lawyer, judge

Koh Eng Tian SC was the first Solicitor-General of Singapore. He was appointed to the post in 1981 until his retirement in December 1991. He was born in 1937 and was educated in Victoria School and the University of Malaya in Singapore. He was one of the first two Senior Counsel appointed in Singapore in 1989.
