= Chew Chin Hin =

Singaporean doctor (1931–2024)

Chew Chin Hin (1931 – December 14, 2024) was a Singaporean doctor.

== Life and career ==
Chew attended Anglo-Chinese School (ACS) on Coleman Street and Victoria School. He graduated from Hong Kong University in 1955 with an MBBS. In 1963, he became a fellow of the Academy of Medicine, Singapore.

He was the ninth head of the Academy of Medicine, Singapore from 1973 to 1975. He worked at Tan Tock Seng Hospital from 1979 to 1991. In 1982, he was awarded the Public Administration Gold Medal. In 1991, he was awarded the Long Service Award. In 2001, he was awarded an honorary fellowship by the Hong Kong College of Physicians.
