= Tan Swee Leong =

Singaporean radio and television personality

Tan in 1995.

Tan Swee Leong (1938 – 18 December 2015) was a Singaporean radio and television personality. Initially a ballet dancer, he joined Rediffusion Singapore in 1960. He was also known hosting Radio Television Singapore shows such as Guthrie Hour and for forming a popular "DJ duo" with Larry Lai. A household name from the 1960s to 1980s, Tan is also remembered as a mentor to younger presenters and bands.

== Early life and education ==
Tan was born in the late 1930s to Tan Cheng Tee, a bank cashier. He was educated at Victoria School. Tan claimed to have "always loved dancing." He had also learnt to play the piano by himself because of this.

== Career ==
By 1958, Tan had become a student at the Singapore Ballet Academy. He could also perform Spanish, tap, ballroom and cha-cha-cha dances. Tan performed as the drummer boy in the ballet show organised by Martinus and Poh at the Canning Rise Cultural Centre, staged from 2 to 4 May and featuring students from the school. This was his "first big solo role". Martinus then formed the Singapore Ballet Company, of which Tan was a member. The Straits Times reported that he was among the company's more "senior" members and that he had already appeared in "many" charity shows in the country. By August 1960, he had portrayed the Prince of the East in Ming Toi and performed the Arabian pas de deux from The Nutcracker. The Singapore Free Press that he was "one of the most promising young men in ballet" in Singapore.

Tan joined Rediffusion Singapore in 1960. He had been hired together with Larry Lai to replace DJs Tan Hock Lye and Steven Lee, who had been "poached" by Radio Singapore and left three months after the former two joined. Tan and Lai began broadcasting a week after their hiring. The two became a "popular DJ duo". The pair had a show called Feuding and Fighting, which was meant to be scripted. They also did a show called the Under 21 Club. Lai claimed that when Harry Belafonte came to Singapore, he and Tan were asked to interview him. Though Belafonte refused any interviews, Tan and Lai deduced his room at the Raffles Hotel and climbed a tree to reach it, after which Belafonte, who "took pity" on them, granted them an interview. According to The Straits Times, in Singapore, Tan's name was "once described as being synonymous with deejay and compère." He was voted Fanfare's deejay of the year more than once. He also worked as a sales and promotions manager, a marketing executive and an executive coordinator of several projects such as hotels. By February 1970, he had been appointed the sales manager for the Shangri-La Hotel Singapore.

In 1972, Tan left Rediffusion as he was sent to Manila to set up a hotel. He could not afford to only work at Rediffusion as compèring and disc jockeying "[did] not pay enough". He spent four years there before returning to Singapore in 1975 despite having the opportunity to renew his contract, as he was "missing the Singapore scene and food." Before returning, he went to New York City to attend a nine-week course on management at Cornell University. After returning to Singapore, Tan began working at Radio Television Singapore, hosting the Guthrie Hour musical variety show, as well as a half-hour light music programme for Radio Singapore. However, he found that the local hotels were not hiring and then announced that he may return to the United States after Guthrie Hour was finished. In 1976, he became the executive co-coordinator of the redevelopment of the Chequers Hotel on Thomson Road. By April 1977, he had become the executive coordinator of Singapore Aquatic Sports, a subsidiary of Goldhill Properties.

In 1980, Tan "[made] a comeback to broadcasting" by hosting Rediffusion Singapore's An Evening to Remember, which aired on Monday evenings beginning in August 1980. In November, he began compèring the Singapore Broadcasting Corporation show The Sounds of Lowrey, which aired on Channel 5. In December, he organised a musical event which was sponsored by Cycle and Carriage and held at the Shangri-La Hotel. Tan became the organiser of the Miss Singapore World pageant in 1981 through Tan Swee Leong Associates. He lost the franchise in 1987 as he had only made $6,000 in profit from the contest the previous year.

== Personal life and death ==
Tan married Maureen Wilson, a mother of three, in May 1968. However, she later claimed that he "habitually kept late nights despite her objections." The family moved together to Manila when Tan was to set up a hotel there. However, Wilson filed for divorce in January 1979, claiming that Tan's conduct towards her got "progressively worse" and that she would go several days without seeing him. She further claimed that she had decided to leave him in January 1975, returning to Singapore. When Tan returned to Singapore in September, he was allowed to live in her house, though he was "no more than a lodger there". He had moved out by 1979. Wilson was granted a decree nisi on grounds of constructive desertion which went uncontested by Tan. He had two other marriages which ended in divorce.

In November 2015, Tan was diagnosed with rectal cancer. He received treatment for the cancer at the Khoo Teck Puat Hospital. However, he died of the disease on 18 December.
