= Barry Desker =

Singaporean diplomat

Barry Desker is a former Singaporean diplomat and corporate executive. He was the non-resident ambassador to the Vatican and Spain, as well as Singapore's representative to the ASEAN Intergovernmental Commission on Human Rights. Desker also serves as the chairman of the board of governors of Singapore Technologies Marine. He is a trustee of Singapore's Institute of Southeast Asian Studies, as well as a distinguished fellow and former dean of the S Rajaratnam School of International Studies. He was also a member of the Presidential Council for Minority Rights.

Desker was born on 29 March 1947 in Singapore. He joined the foreign service in 1970. Desker served as Singapore's Deputy Permanent Representative to the United Nations in New York from 1982 to 1984.

He was Singapore's Ambassador to Indonesia from 1986 to 1993. He retired from the foreign service in 1993 and was appointed the chief executive officer (CEO) of the Trade Development Board (1994-2000). He was Singapore's Deputy Permanent Representative to the United Nations in New York. He was previously on the Boards of Sime SembCorp Engineering Sdn Bhd, Sembawang Engineering and Construction (now SembCorp Utilities) and Jurong Port.

Desker took over as director of the Institute of Defence and Strategic Studies (IDSS) in 2000. The IDSS was expanded to a full graduate school and policy-focused think tank in 2007, and was renamed as the S Rajaratnam School of International Studies. Desker stepped down as dean of the school in 2014.

Desker, a President's Scholar, graduated from the University of Singapore with a Bachelor of Arts (First Class Honours) degree in 1970 and obtained his master's degree from the University of London in 1973.

Desker is also an Asia-Pacific member of the Trilateral Commission.
