= Presidential Council for Minority Rights =

Government body in Singapore

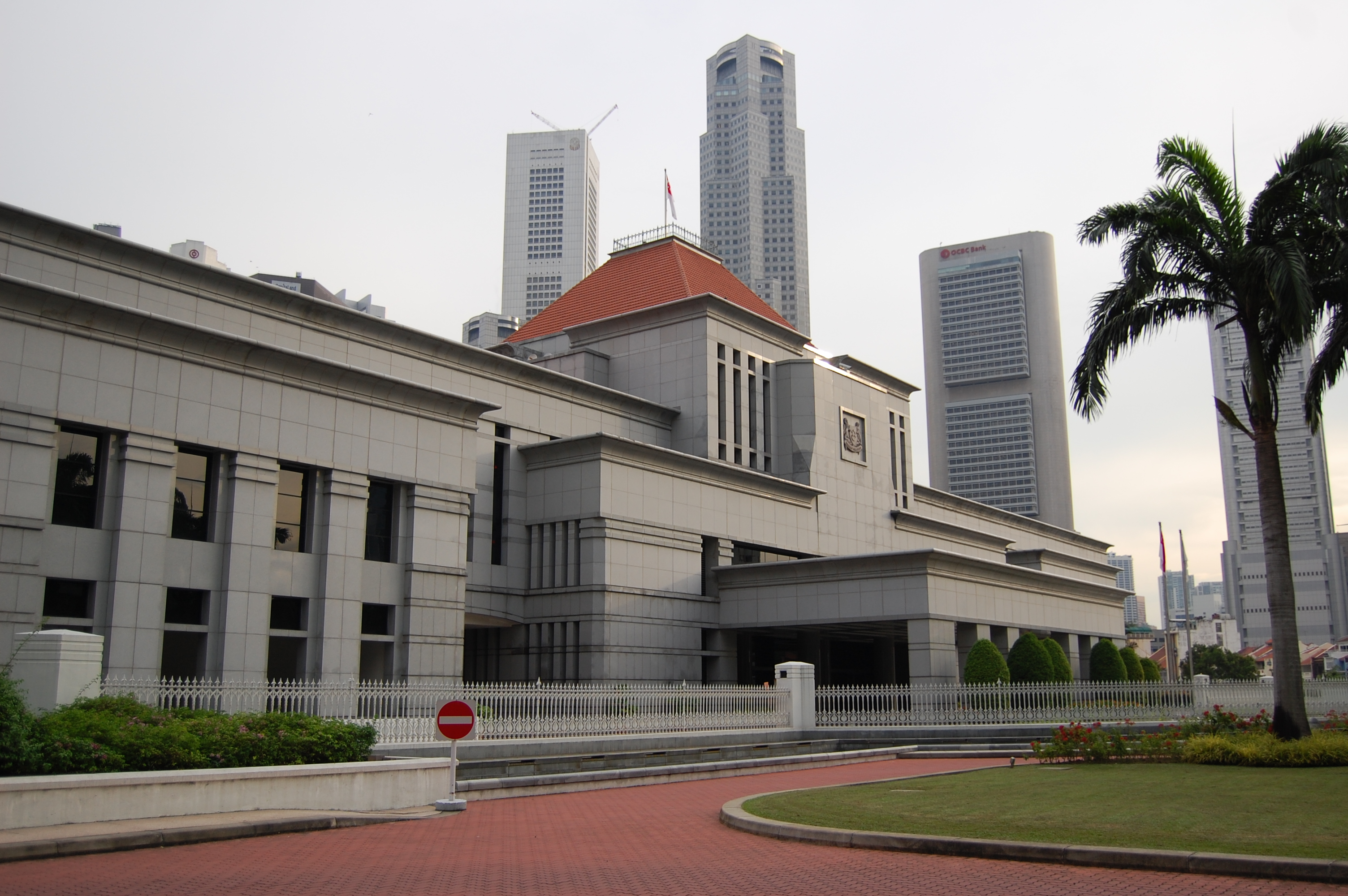
Parliament House, Singapore, photographed in December 2008. The Presidential Council for Minority Rights meets in this building to scrutinize certain types of legislation for provisions discriminating against racial or religious communities in Singapore

The Presidential Council for Minority Rights (PCMR) is a non-elected government body in Singapore established in 1970, the main function of which is to scrutinize most of the bills passed by Parliament to ensure that they do not discriminate against any racial or religious community. If the Council feels that any provision in a bill amounts to a differentiating measure, it will report its findings to Parliament and refer the bill back to Parliament for reconsideration. The council also examines subsidiary legislation and statutes in force on 9 January 1970. One member of the PCMR is nominated by the chairman to the Presidential Elections Committee, which is empowered to ensure that candidates for the office of President have the qualifications required by the Constitution. The President also appoints and dismisses the chairman and members of the Presidential Council for Religious Harmony ("PCRH"), established by the Maintenance of Religious Harmony Act (Cap. 167A, 2001 Rev. Ed.), on the advice of the PCMR, and the PCMR is responsible for determining whether PCRH members who are not representatives of major religions in Singapore have distinguished themselves in public service or community relations in Singapore.

The council is made up of its Chairman (as of 6 November 2012 the Chief Justice of Singapore, Sundaresh Menon), up to ten permanent members who are appointed for life, and up to ten ordinary members who are appointed for a period of three years and may be re-appointed. Appointments are made by the President on the advice of the Cabinet. If the President does not concur with Cabinet's advice, he may veto appointments. However, he is required to consult the Council of Presidential Advisers ("CPA"), and if the CPA does not concur with his view, Parliament may override his decision with a resolution passed with a two-thirds majority vote. The President has no power to remove current PCMR members.

The Constitution only requires members of the council to be Singapore citizens residing in Singapore who are at least 35 years old. There is no restriction on Cabinet ministers and members of political parties. Moreover, the Prime Minister may authorize any Minister, Minister of State or Parliamentary Secretary to attend Council meetings. It has been noted that this may have a chilling effect on the council's deliberations as such a guest might be the author or a vocal proponent of the legislation under scrutiny. On the other hand, it has been suggested that members with political affiliations can often make the biggest contribution towards the council's discussions. Another criticism of the PCMR's composition is that having judges on the Council may lead to a conflict of interest as they may have to exercise judicial review over Acts of Parliament they have either endorsed or rejected previously.

All proceedings of the council are conducted in private, and the council is prohibited from hearing objectors or examining witnesses regarding any bill or law under consideration. Since its establishment, the PCMR has not found any legislation to contain differentiating measures.

== Role ==
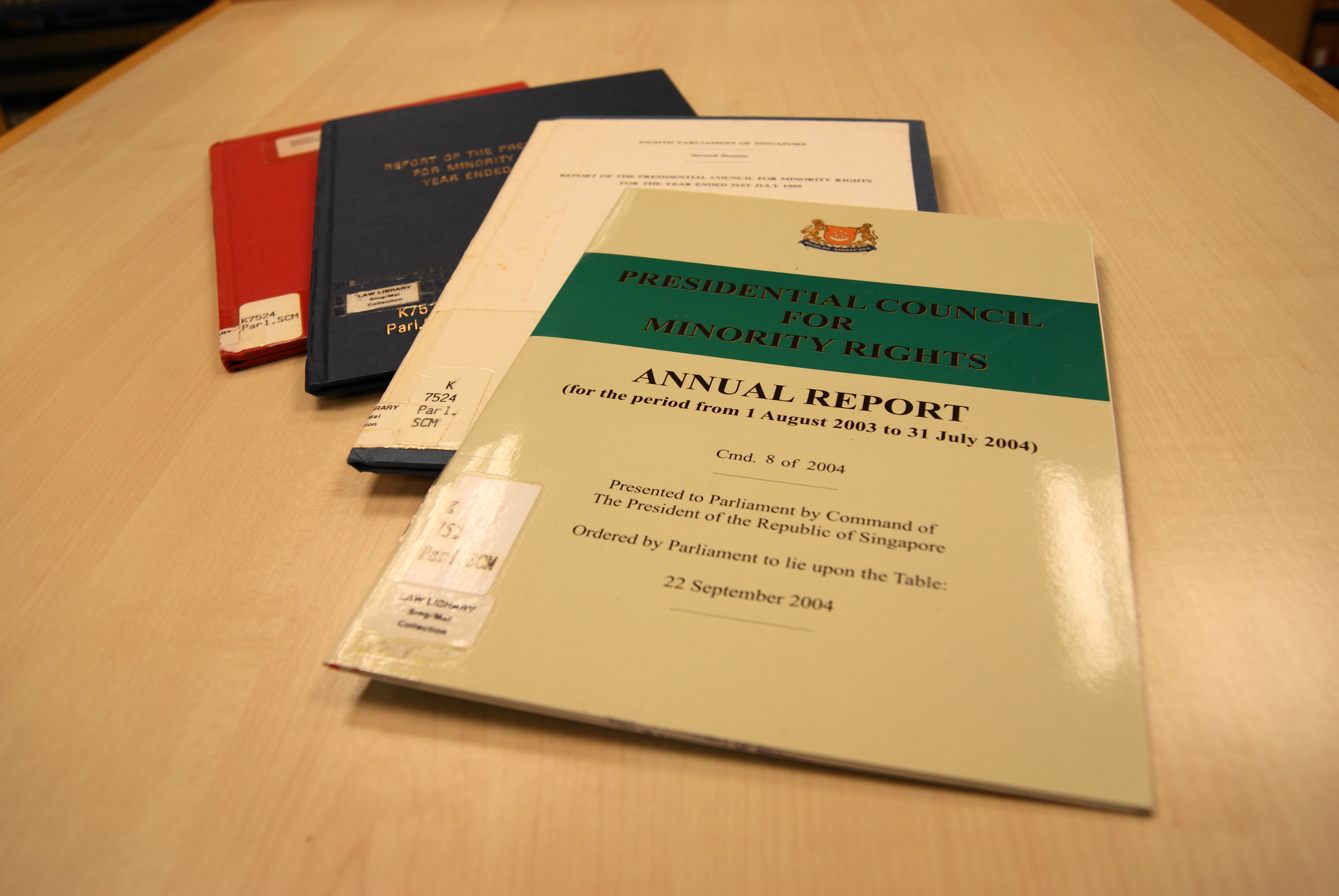
Copies of the PCMR's annual reports

The Presidential Council for Minority Rights (PCMR) is a non-elected body established in 1970 under Part VII of the Constitution of the Republic of Singapore to fulfil the roles of safeguarding minority rights and advising the Government and the Parliament of Singapore. Its general function, as articulated in the Constitution, is "to consider and report on such matters affecting persons of any racial or religious community in Singapore as may be referred to the Council by Parliament or the Government". To fulfil its role as a safeguard against any parliamentary or executive propensity to majoritarian or sectarian politics, it may constrict the Government's freedom to discriminate against racial and religious communities by obstructing the passage of new laws and regulations that it deems to contain such "differentiating measures".

As a legislative review mechanism, it plays a "limited quasi Second Chamber" role. It has also been called "the closest body [Singapore has] to a Second Chamber for many years". However, the council has been criticized for lacking teeth to act as a real check on potential legislative abuses. As of 2009, the PCMR had not issued an adverse report regarding any piece of legislation referred to it. Nevertheless, it forms part of the statutory framework for the People's Action Party government's internationally lauded efforts in managing minority issues in multiethnic Singapore. Former Deputy Prime Minister S. Jayakumar, formerly a member of the council, has noted that the PCMR is also a symbol of the paramount importance placed on racial harmony in a world still rife with racial and communal conflict.

== Origin ==
=== The Wee Chong Jin Constitutional Commission ===
On 18 January 1966, shortly after Singapore's independence, the President of Singapore appointed a Constitutional Commission helmed by Chief Justice Wee Chong Jin to consider how the rights of racial, linguistic, and religious minorities in the nascent nation should be protected. Singapore had just been ejected from Malaysia, and had experienced an extended period of racial and religious tension resulting from the Maria Hertogh riots. This experience reinforced the need for a multiracial society based on equality among races.

The commission, in its report on 27 August 1966, found that such equality was best protected by giving minority rights equal footing with the fundamental liberties in the Constitution. In addition, it recommended a "Council of State", an advisory body that would inform the Government of the effects its laws would have on minorities. This concept was based on the Kenyan Council of State which was established in 1958 during its phase of transition to African majority rule. The idea of an advisory body which could not significantly impede the legislative agenda was viewed by lawmakers as a promising innovation. In addition, the creation of an advisory council ensuring equal treatment in legislation was very much in line with the idea that, as citizens become increasingly aware of racial and religious issues, national growth will very much depend on an approach to such problems that is not fraught with religious and racial tensions.

Some of the recommendations for the new Council of State included the following:

- Members of the council were to be appointed after consultation with the Prime Minister, but at the President's discretion.
- No member should belong to a political party.
- Membership would be assigned and renewed for a specified period of either three, six or nine years.
- Proceedings should be held in public.

=== Parliamentary debate on the Constitution (Amendment) Bill 1969 ===
The Constitution (Amendment) Act 1969 was passed on 23 December 1969 to create the "Presidential Council" based heavily on the proposed Council of State. The amendment took effect on 9 January 1970. This council was subsequently renamed the Presidential Council for Minority Rights in 1973. Although the proposal of the commission was accepted by Parliament, it nonetheless made several changes that led to the substantial differences from the original proposal, including the following:

- Appointments to the council are made by the President on the advice of the Cabinet.
- There are two categories members, namely, permanent and non-permanent members, with the permanent members holding life tenure.
- Members of Parliament (MPs), including ministers, are not precluded from sitting in the council and serving their terms in Parliament simultaneously.
- Affiliation with a political party is not a bar to Council membership.

Supporters of the new body heralded the Presidential Council as a step forward in enhancing the country's democratic spirit. Its establishment was seen as putting a limit on possible dictatorial measures in legislation, which is especially important in a one-party dominated Parliament like Singapore's. Even if the new Council's powers were strictly limited to giving advice, this was justified on the basis that it would nevertheless serve to alert the public should the Government proceed to enact an Act which prejudices a class of minorities. Indeed, the Constitutional Commission had intended for the Council of State "to fix the attention of the public on any matter originating from Parliament which may adversely affect the interests of any minority group".

== Composition, appointment and term of office of members ==
=== Composition ===
The Presidential Council can consist of no more than 21 persons at any one time. The council is made up of its chairman, up to ten permanent members who are appointed for life, and up to ten ordinary members who are appointed for a period of three years and may be re-appointed. The distinction between permanent and non-permanent members was not one of the recommendations of the Constitutional Commission, and the Government did not adopt the commission's proposal that members should not belong to a political party. It has been suggested that this causes the PCMR's composition to be "somewhat weighted in favour of the Government and to that extent derogates from the concept of an uncommitted council of elders which sits as a watchdog over the rights of individuals".

The chairman is responsible for convening and presiding at all meetings of the council, but whenever the office of chairman is vacant, the Council may elect any member to act as chairman. The chairman has an original vote but not a casting vote. No fewer than eight members, including the chairman or another member appointed to preside in his place, must convene in order for the council to transact any business. Any motion in the Council fails in the event of a tie.

=== Appointment and term of office ===
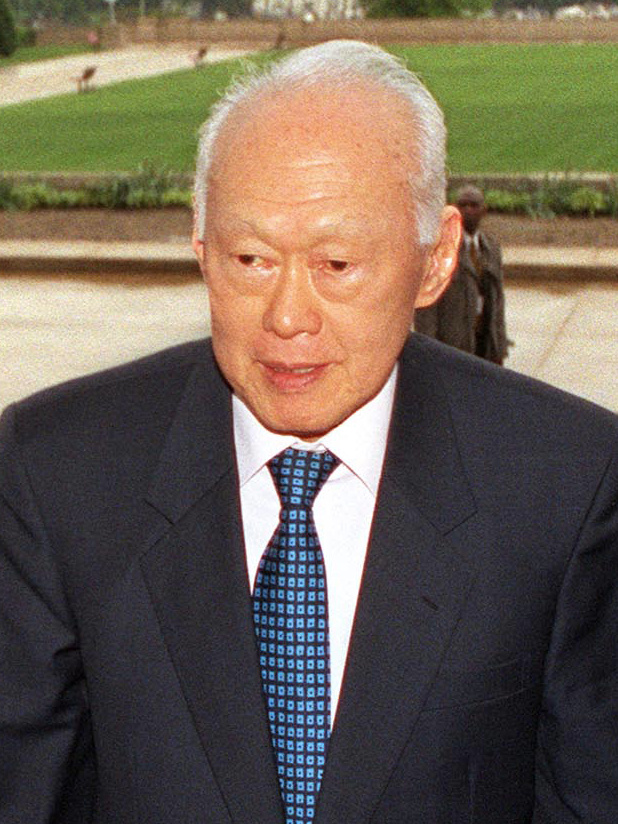
One of the longest serving members of the PCMR, former Prime Minister of Singapore Lee Kuan Yew was a permanent member of the Council at the time of his death on 23 March 2015

The members of the Presidential Council are not elected, but appointed by the President on advice of the Cabinet. No public nomination process or vote is stipulated in the Constitution. The President, if he does not concur with the Cabinet, may veto the appointment. However, he is required to consult the Council of Presidential Advisers ("CPA"), a constitutional body that advises the President on appointments of key public officials and matters relating to Singapore's financial reserves. If he exercises his veto without the CPA's concurrence, Parliament may overrule his decision with a resolution passed with a two-thirds majority vote. The President has no power to remove current members.

Members of the Council must be Singapore citizens of at least 35 years of age residing in Singapore. Apart from these qualifications stated in the Constitution, there was an indication in the Parliamentary debates leading to the PCMR's introduction that permanent members of the PCMR are very likely to be drawn from "men of distinction" who hold or have held high public appointments, such as former prime ministers, the Chief Justice, former chief justices, judges, the Speaker of the Parliament of Singapore, the Chairman of the Public Service Commission, the Attorney-General and former permanent secretaries. Non-permanent members will probably be mature citizens who have rendered distinguished public service, or are prominent members of their professions.

A member may be disqualified if he is found to be of unsound mind, if he becomes insolvent or is an undischarged bankrupt, if he is convicted and sentenced to imprisonment of not less than one year or a fine of not less than S$2,000, or if he has lost his Singaporean citizenship or declared himself allied to a foreign country. Any questions as to membership or disqualification are determined by a tribunal convened in secret that consists of a Supreme Court judge appointed by the Chief Justice and two members appointed by the council. The Constitution does not stipulate any procedure for the removal of a member besides disqualification and the member's own resignation.

=== Members ===
As of 5 February 2026, there are 19 members on the PCMR, five of whom are permanent members. The chairman is Chief Justice Sundaresh Menon (who took over from former Chief Justice Chan Sek Keong who retired on 5 November 2012), permanent members include Prime Minister Lawrence Wong and Senior Minister Lee Hsien Loong. Appointed members include Attorney-General Lucien Wong, and the Roman Catholic Archbishop of Singapore William Goh.

Position	Name	Dates of appointment	Notes
Chairman	Sundaresh Menon; Chief Justice	From 6 November 2012	
Permanent members	S. Dhanabalan; Former Cabinet Minister and Chairman of Temasek Holdings	From 1 July 1998	
Permanent members	Goh Chok Tong; Emeritus Senior Minister	From 1 July 1998	
Permanent members	Lee Hsien Loong; Senior Minister	From 15 July 2006	
Permanent members	K. Shanmugam; Senior Minister, Coordinating Minister for National Security and Minister for Home Affairs	From 31 October 2011	
Permanent members	Lawrence Wong; Prime Minister and Minister for Finance	From	
Permanent members	Abdullah Tarmugi; Former Speaker of Parliament		Former member from 10 January 2012
Other members	Lucien Wong Attorney-General	From	
Other members	Othman Haron Eusofe; Former Minister of State	From	
Other members	Timothy James de Souza; Former president of the Eurasian Association		
Other members	Chan Heng Chee; Former Singapore Ambassador to the United States		
Other members	Barry Desker; Distinguished Fellow, S. Rajaratnam School of International Studies		
Other members	Philip Antony Jeyaretnam; Managing Partner, Rodyk & Davidson LLP		
Other members	William Goh Seng Chye; Archbishop of Singapore		
Other members	Surjit Singh s/o Wajid Singh; Former chairman of the Sikh Advisory Board		
Other members	Sik Kwang Sheng		
Other members	Syed Hassan bin Syed Mohamed Bin Salim Al-Attas		
Other members	Nazirudin Mohd Nasir; Mufti of Singapore		
Other members	Mohamed Sa’at Abdul Rahman		

==== Former members ====
Former Prime Minister Lee Kuan Yew and cabinet minister Othman Wok were permanent members of the council until their respective deaths in 2015 and 2017.

Position	Name	Dates of appointment
Other members	Joseph Yuvaraj Pillay; Former Permanent Secretary	15 July 2003 – 14 July 2015
Other members	Nicholas Chia Yeck Joo; Archbishop Emeritus of Singapore	15 July 2006 – 14 July 2015
Other members	Othman Haron Eusofe; Former Minister of State	15 July 2006 – 14 July 2015
Other members	Timothy James de Souza; Former president of the Eurasian Association	From 2 May 2010
Other members	Chan Heng Chee; Former Singapore Ambassador to the United States	15 July 2012 – 14 July 2015
Other members	Steven Chong Horng Siong; Judge of the Supreme Court	15 July 2012 – 14 July 2015
Other members	Barry Desker; Distinguished Fellow, S. Rajaratnam School of International Studies	15 July 2012 – 14 July 2015
Other members	Philip Antony Jeyaretnam; Managing Partner, Rodyk & Davidson LLP	15 July 2012 – 14 July 2015
Other members	V. K. Rajah; Attorney-General of Singapore	25 June 2014 – 24 June 2017
Other members	William Goh Seng Chye; Archbishop of Singapore	1 April 2015 – 31 March 2018
Other members	Shaikh Syed Isa bin Mohamed Semait; Former mufti of Singapore	1 April 2015 – 31 March 2018
Other members	Surjit Singh s/o Wajid Singh; Former chairman of the Sikh Advisory Board	1 April 2015 – 31 March 2018
Other members	Lucien Wong; Attorney-General of Singapore	14 January 2017 – 13 January 2020

=== Issues ===
The existence of permanent members; the opacity of appointment; and the inclusion of members of the Government, political parties, and their allies may mean that the PCMR could be used as a tool for the government of the day to remain in power despite its waning popularity in the future.

While the President may block certain appointments to the council, he cannot remove a permanent member from his seat. In fact, it does not appear that any person has the power to do so. The door may be open for potential abuse with appointments based on some political agenda rather than merit. The counterpoint is that it is precisely those in power who are best placed to scrutinize bills for illegitimate differentiating measures, because "it is often those with political affiliations who can make the biggest contribution to the discussion; if nothing else, from the folly and error of their past ways".

The presence of judicial members on the Council may also pose additional problems. There is a possibility of conflict of interest for judges who sit as members of the Council if they find themselves having to review the very Acts of Parliament that they have either endorsed or rejected previously. This is exacerbated by the fact that the council, in examining the legitimacy of Bills, plays a quasi-judicial role. There may be confusion as regards the legality of a piece of legislation if, for example, it was initially condemned by the council but enacted by the Government and later endorsed by the courts upon judicial review. When the potential conflict between the Chief Justice's role as head of the judiciary and as chairman of the council was raised in 2010 by Githu Muigai, the United Nations Special Rapporteur on Contemporary Forms of Racism, Racial Discrimination, Xenophobia and Related Tolerance, he was informed that the Chief Justice would recuse himself from any matter in which a conflict arose.

On the other hand, it has been suggested that the enactment of a statute by Parliament in the face of an adverse report by the PCMR should be taken as a "mere disagreement over the interpretation of the Constitution and thus should not foreclose judicial review". However, this depends on whether the statute in question is a constitutional amendment or an ordinary Act of Parliament. Acts of Parliament may be disputed in court for their lack of compliance with the Constitution, but constitutional amendments may not be.

Further, scrutinizing legislation to determine if it contravenes fundamental liberties is traditionally the function of the judiciary. Even though the PCMR can potentially prevent an unconstitutional piece of legislation from coming into force, there is doubt as to whether the council's members have sufficient legal training to undertake the burdensome task.

== Powers and functions ==
The PCMR may examine bills, subsidiary legislation, and written laws in force on 9 January 1970 for any "differentiating measure", which is defined as any measure "which is, or is likely in its practical application to be, disadvantageous to persons of any racial or religious community and not equally disadvantageous to persons of other such communities, either directly by prejudicing persons of that community or indirectly by giving advantage to persons of another community". All proceedings are conducted in private, and the council is prohibited from hearing objectors or examining witnesses regarding any bill or law under consideration.

Such privacy means that the council is denied even a modest "sanction" of publicity. Under the Constitutional Commission's original proposal, the PCMR was meant to hold its meetings publicly in Parliament, and publish reports of such proceedings. These proposals were rejected on the ground that such publicity might have the adverse consequence of giving members a public forum at which to further their own agendas. E.W. Barker, the Minister for Law and National Development, commented in Parliament that having the discussions in private helps to ensure that they are conducted frankly and constructively, and not held with an eye on the press or with a view to scoring political points.

The validity of such measures to promote free discussion may be negated by Article 87 of the Constitution, which provides that any Minister, Minister of State or Parliamentary Secretary specially authorized by the Prime Minister may attend these private meetings. There may be a real chilling effect on the deliberations when a guest might well be the author or a vocal proponent of the legislation being scrutinized.

Moreover, the council's secrecy has been criticized as contrary to its status as a symbol of racial harmony in Singapore. The discharge of such a role requires that the PCMR projects an image of effectiveness, which the current requirement of secrecy arguably impedes. Secret discussions also prevent the public from being informed about controversial issues that may have arisen in the course of implementing new laws, especially those which may affect the rights of minorities.

=== Bills ===
The Speaker of Parliament is required to refer all bills, with some exceptions, to the PCMR for consideration immediately after the third reading of the bill in Parliament and obtain the council's report on it before the bill may be sent to the President for assent.

The Council must make its report to Parliament within 30 days of the passage of any bill that is referred to it, judging if any provisions of the Bill are "discriminatory or inconsistent with fundamental liberties". However, if the bill is particularly complex or of great length, the Speaker has the discretion to extend the deadline upon application by the chairman. If the Council fails to make a report within the given timeframe, it is "conclusively presumed" that the council is satisfied that the bill is free from differentiating measures.

The referral of a bill only after its third reading means that Parliament will not have the opportunity of considering the council's views on the bill prior to the debate. The Wee Chong Jin Commission had advocated for the council to consider each bill after it had been introduced during its second reading, on the presumption that the council would express views that would benefit the debate on the bill. Additionally, since Parliament has already passed the bill, Parliament may consider it a "point of honour to maintain its original view ... whatever the merits of the Council's objections" as they have already debated the bill and may decide to "stick to their original guns".

If the Council does make an adverse report, Parliament may amend the bill to rid it of any differentiating measures before sending it back to the council for inspection. The MP having charge of the bill may give two clear days' notice of the amendments they propose to move in Parliament to the provisions of the bill that were adversely reported upon by the council. The bill then stands recommitted to a committee of the whole Parliament on those provisions, and the proposed amendments are considered. Parliament then resumes, and the MP having charge of the bill reports whether the amendments were agreed to by the committee. If so, the MP moves that the amended bill should be resubmitted to the council. There is uncertainty as to whether the council will have to make another report within any time limit, or if the bill will then be directly presented to the President for assent.

Alternatively, Parliament may effectively ignore the council's adverse report with a motion passed with an affirmative vote of two-thirds of its members. Again, the MP in charge of the bill must give two clear days' notice of his intention to move that the bill be presented to the President for assent despite the adverse report. Following a debate, MPs vote on the motion by taking a division. If Parliament rejects the adverse report in this way, Parliament may send the bill, notwithstanding any differentiating measures, to the President for assent. These overriding mechanisms against adverse reports present difficulties when seen in the light of Article 12 of the Constitution, which is meant to guarantee equal protection under the law to minorities without discrimination, since bills containing differentiating measures that are presented to the President for assent can be seen as "inconsistent with the fundamental liberties of the subject".

==== Excluded types of bills ====
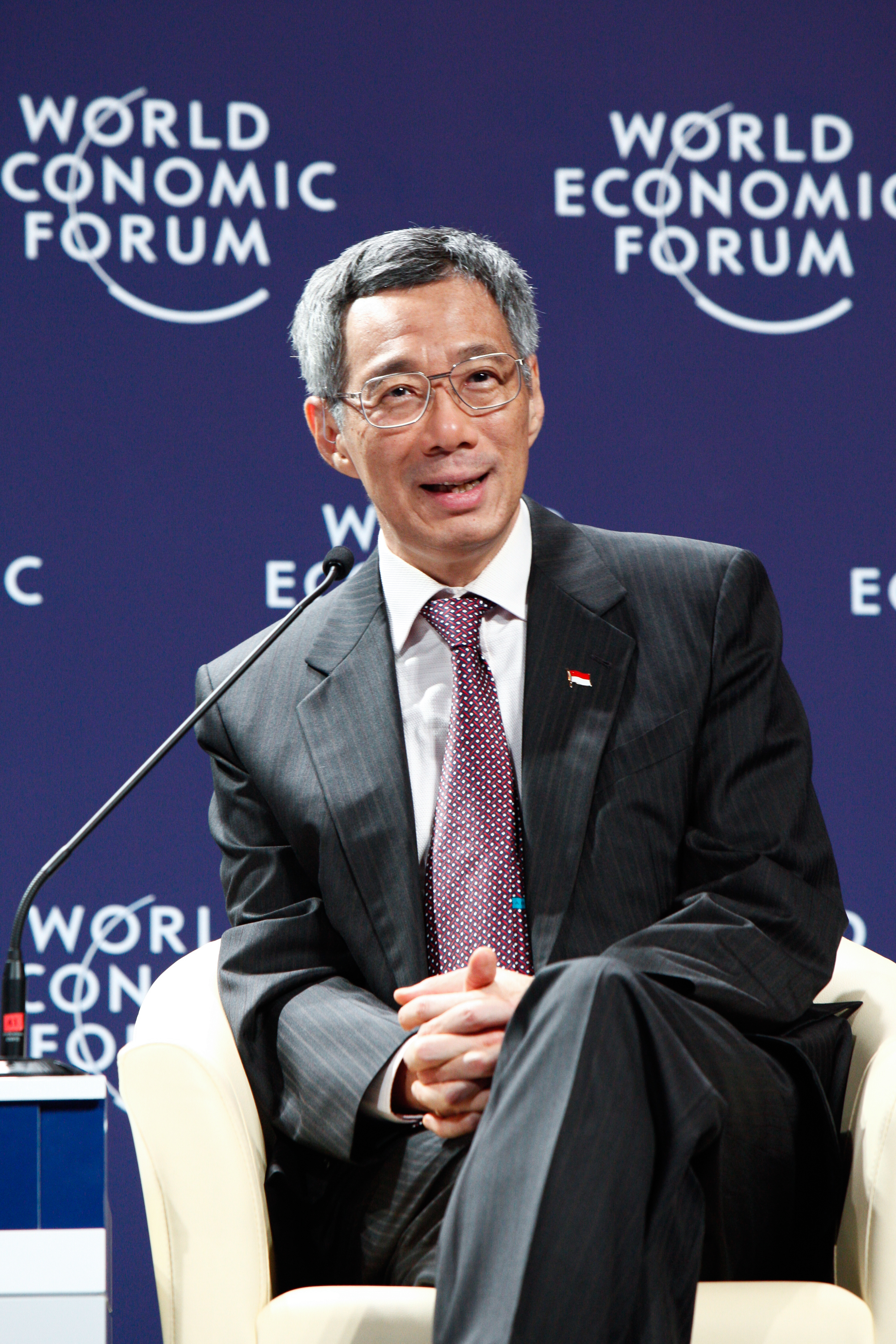
Prime Minister of Singapore Lee Hsien Loong at the World Economic Forum on East Asia in Jakarta, Indonesia, on 12 June 2011. The PM may certify that, for certain reasons, a bill does not need to be referred to the PCMR.

Three types of bills are expressly excluded from the scrutiny of the PCMR:

1. Money bills; that is, bills which contains provisions dealing with public money, taxation, payments of debts or charges on public funds, grants of money to the Government, the raising or guaranteeing of loans, and any ancillary matters relating to such matters.
2. Bills that the Prime Minister certifies as affecting "the defence or security of Singapore, or which relate to the public safety, peace or good order of Singapore".
3. Bills that the Prime Minister certifies to be so urgent that any delay in enactment would be detrimental to the public welfare.

It has been argued that such exemptions are too wide and may be open to abuse. For instance, it is up to the Speaker to determine whether any bill falls within the definition of a money bill, and once he has certified his opinion on the matter in writing, that is "conclusive for all purposes and shall not be open to question in any court". Moreover, grounds upon which bills may be excluded such as "public safety" and "peace", have been described as "nebulous" with potentially wide definitions that are open to abuse by the government in power. As regards a bill that has been enacted on a certificate of urgency and assented to by the President, the Speaker is required to send the Act of Parliament to the council as soon as possible for its report, which is then presented to Parliament. However, the Constitution contains no provisions as to any steps that Parliament is required to take to amending the Act if an adverse report is made.

=== Subsidiary legislation and certain written laws ===
All new subsidiary legislation must be sent to the council for scrutiny within 14 days of their publication in the Government Gazette. The council is then required to make its report to the Speaker and the appropriate Minister within 30 days. However, unlike with bills, there is no provision to extend the original deadline. As with bills, tardiness in sending an adverse report results in a conclusive presumption that the Council finds no differentiating measures in the subsidiary legislation. Where the Council issues an adverse report, the Minister must revoke or amend the offending provision within six months of the report, unless Parliament passes a resolution confirming that provision.

The Council may also make a report on any written law in force on 9 January 1970, but there is no constitutional provision that requires Parliament or the relevant Minister to act on it.

=== Other functions of the Council and its members ===
One of the members of the Presidential Elections Committee, which is the body empowered to ensure that candidates for the office of president have the qualifications required by the Constitution, is a member of the PCMR appointed to this post by the chairman of the council.

The council also effectively decides the composition of the Presidential Council for Religious Harmony ("PCRH"), established by the Maintenance of Religious Harmony Act. The President appoints the chairman and the members of the PCRH on the advice of the council, and the council is responsible for determining whether the members of the PCRH who are not representatives of major religions in Singapore have "distinguished themselves in public service or community relations in Singapore". The President is also required to consult the council before revoking the membership of any member of the PCRH. However, the President has the discretion to veto any appointment or revocation if he does not agree with the PCMR.

== The PCMR as an "Upper Chamber" ==
The composition of the Parliament of Singapore following the 2011 general election. It has been argued that the efficacy of the PCMR is greatly restricted by the fact that the ruling People's Action Party (represented by the grey dots) can easily acquire the two-thirds majority of all MPs needed to surmount any adverse reports the Council may issue.

The Singaporean Parliament is unicameral in nature, consisting of a single legislative body tasked with making laws. However, the notion of a second legislative chamber was considered on two separate occasions. In 1954, a constitutional commission headed by Sir George William Rendel rejected a proposal for a second chamber composed solely of minority representatives, citing its unsuitability in a tiny state like Singapore and arguing that it might end up being unnecessarily bureaucratic. It also asserted that such an upper House might potentially be detrimental to social cohesion. This issue was also considered by the Wee Chong Jin Commission, which rejected it on similar grounds.

The PCMR's power to review and block the passage of Bills is regarded by some as an indication of its potential as a second chamber. The council's functional design, however, makes it only a very weak legislative review mechanism. The council has no power to investigate alleged breaches of minority rights. The general public has also no right of making their views or complaints known to the Chamber. In addition, the lack of a veto power means that currently the most the council can do is delay the passage of bills and prompt further parliamentary deliberation of the bills in question. But it has yet to do even this much. On those occasions where the Council might have rightly drawn attention to differentiating measures in proposed Bills, the legislature has pre-empted this by inserting "notwithstanding clauses" in the Constitution. Such clauses declare that laws that contravene a constitutional provision are nevertheless valid.

An alternative view is that it is not the formal structure of the council – which in theory is capable of exercising judicial, legislative and review functions – but the presence of a practically single-party Parliament that drastically undermines the PCMR's powers, restricting it solely to an advisory capacity. This may not be the case if a strong Opposition exists in Parliament to obstruct the mustering of the required two-thirds voting majority required to push through legislation without the endorsement of the council.

Besides being criticized for its limited powers, there is also some concern that the council's responsibilities may go too far. By taking up the function of scrutinizing existing and prospective legislation for differentiating measures and inconsistencies with fundamental liberties, the Council may be encroaching on the functions of constitutional interpretation, which is traditionally the function of courts. Even though the council has the additional advantage of identifying potentially unconstitutional legislation at an early stage, thereby preventing unnecessary litigation in the future, there is doubt as to the ability of the council to take on such a task. Given that constitutional interpretation is traditionally the function of lawyers and the courts, the task may be best carried out by the legally trained members of the PCMR.

== See also ==
- Constitution of Singapore
- Parliament of Singapore
- Powers of the President of Singapore
- Sources of Singapore law
