= Nazirudin Mohd Nasir =

Singaporean Islamic cleric (born c. 1977)

Mufti of Singapore
- Incumbent
- Assumed office 1 March 2020
- Preceded by: Mohamed Fatris Bakaram

Member of the Presidential Council for Minority Rights
- Incumbent
- Assumed office 1 February 2024

Personal details
- Born: 1977 (age 48–49) Singapore City, Singapore
- Education: University of Oxford
- Occupation: Islamic cleric

Nazirudin Mohd Nasir (born c. 1977) is a Singaporean Islamic cleric currently serving as the 4th mufti of Singapore since 2020. He is also a member of the National Steering Committee on Racial and Religious Harmony. Nasir was appointed as a member of the Presidential Council for Minority Rights in February 2024 for a term of three years. As a mufti, he is also the director of religious and policy development at the Majlis Ugama Islam Singapura.

== Biography ==
Nasir completed his O levels at Victoria School before attending a madrasah or an Islamic religious school. He obtained his M.A. in comparative law from SOAS University of London, followed by a Master of Studies in religion at St. Cross College, Oxford in 2015. He later completed a Doctor of Theology at the University of Oxford, where his research was focused on the origins and development of the concept of Abrahamic religions, with a focus on the contributions of French Islamic scholar Louis Massignon. He obtained his first degree in Islamic law from Al-Azhar University in Cairo.

He teaches world religions and ethics at the Singapore University of Social Sciences (SUSS).
