= Zac Leow =

Singaporean athlete

Zac Leow （廖子翔）
Personal information
- Nationality: Singaporean
- Born: c. 1986 Singapore

Sport
- Sport: Athletics

Zac Leow (born c. 1986) is a Singaporean para-athlete.

Leow set a Guinness world-record time at the Standard Chartered Singapore Marathon (SCSM) on 3 December 2023. The exercise scientist smashed the CI1 (men) para-classification marathon world record mark of 5 hr 30 min, completing the 42.195 km race in 4 hr 51 min 59 sec. Leow said:"I’m from Victoria School, along the East Coast Parkway service road, so when I saw my school during my run, I was reminded of the fighting spirit instilled in us there, and that kept me going.”

Prior to this, the PhD graduate from the University of Western Australia had won a silver medal at the 2015 ASEAN Para Games and silver medal at the CPISRA World Games, Sant Cugat 2018. He is also the current national record for T37 400m and T37 1500m, defying doctors who had said that he would not be able to walk again.
