= Teck Whye Secondary School =

- 德惠中学

Location
- 31 Teck Whye Crescent; Choa Chu Kang, 688848; Singapore
- Coordinates: 1.38340°N 103.75545°E

Information
- Other name: TWSS
- Type: State secondary school
- Motto: To Strive and Not to Yield
- Established: 1966; 60 years ago
- Closed: 2023; 3 years ago
- Session: Single
- School code: 3404
- Principal: N. Sivarajan (last)
- Gender: Co-educational
- Colour: Blue Silver
- Website: www.teckwhyesec.moe.edu.sg

Teck Whye Secondary School (TWSS) was a co-educational government secondary school in Choa Chu Kang, Singapore. It was founded in 1966 and merged with Chua Chu Kang Secondary School in 2023.

== History ==
In the days before English was the main medium of instruction, TWSS used to offer Chinese-medium and Malay-medium classes as well. The school itself was situated in Jalan Teck Whye for many of years, until it had been relocated to a new building in Teck Whye Crescent, 2002. Under the leadership of principal Adrian Cordeiro, the school revamped its school crest, school uniform and school song.

A new principal, Ong Kong Hong, took over at the end of 2009. At the start of January 2014, Edwin Chan, former vice principal of Crescent Girls' School, took over as principal when Ong Kong Hong took up the appointment of Cluster Superintendent at the Ministry of Education headquarters. In 2019, N. Sivarajan took over as principal.

The school merged with nearby Chua Chu Kang Secondary School in 2023. The merged school uses TWSS' campus.
