= Sanusi Mahmood =

Haji Mohamed Sanusi bin Mahmood (27 September 1909 – 8 October 1995) was the first Mufti of Singapore.

== Life ==
Sanusi was one of the few ulama who had a good command of Malay, Arabic and English during his time. From 1922 to 1931, he attended Victoria Bridge School and then Raffles Institution. In 1929, due to his excellent results in the Senior Cambridge examination, he managed to skip two grades. Sanusi went on to study Islam and Arabic from his grandfather, the Mufti of Indera Giri, at Safat, Sumatra, Indonesia from 1931 to 1932.

He was the first Singaporean to obtain the prestigious Al-'Alamiyah from Al-Azhar University in Cairo, Egypt.

In 1968, Sanusi was appointed as Singapore's first Mufti as well as the President of Syariah Court, holding both posts concurrently. In 1972, he stepped down as the Mufti.

He wrote many books, such as "Kamus Istilah Islamiah Sanusi", "Taman Mu'minin" and "Mengenal Islam dan Hubungannya Dengan Sains & Teknologi".

== Death ==
He died peacefully on Sunday, 8 October 1995 at the age of 86, leaving behind six sons and two daughters.

== See also ==
- Malays in Singapore
