= Noorhaqmal Mohamed Noor =

Singaporean musician (born 1984)

Noorhaqmal Mohamed Noor (born 1984)—also known as Aqmal N.—is a Singaporean singer, musician, composer, and producer. His song, "Warkah Cinta Dunia" (2009), has been distributed worldwide on internet websites such as Amazon, Rhapsody, iTunes, Napster, eMusic, SonicTap, ShockHound, Spotify, iMesh and Nokia.

== Career ==
He was the winner of Suria Mediacorp 2004, runner-up for Mediacorp Power 98FM "Army Icon" (2005) and Mediacorp Ria 98.7FM "Ria Remix" (2006), singer of winning song "Suara Itu" for Esplanade SingaRaya (2007), top five for Mediacorp Warna 94.2FM and Ria 89.7FM "Projek Rentak" (2008) and winner of Mediacorp Warna 94.2FM and Ria 89.7FM "Projek Rentak" (2009), with the song entitled Warkah Cinta Dunia.

A singer/songwriter who has won most of Mediacorp's major competitions since winning Mediacorp Suria's Anugerah in 2004. The first musician, singer/songwriter to have a research paper titled Muzik, Bahasa dan Media Baru (Music, Language and New Media) published in Bahasa Sumber Intelektual Peribumi (2009), a compilation of research papers on the Malay language by experts of various fields.

In 2021, Aqmal N was commissioned by the National Museum of Singapore to create a poem, Tanah Sang Perwira (A Hero's Land), to mark the reopening of Reflections at Bukit Chandu.

== Personal life ==
On 15 December 2012, Aqmal N had a stroke and was admitted to Changi General Hospital.

== Bibliography ==
- Noor, Noorhaqmal Mohammed. "Noorhaqmal - Bahasa, Muzik dan Media Baharu". Bahasa Sumber Intelektual Peribumi.
- Awan Tak Larat in Jurnal Akademik Jilid VII Singapura, STP-NIE/NTU (2007)
- Drama Waktu Sesudah Itu mengungkap pengalaman pendokumentasian in Jurnal Akademik Jilid VIII Singapura, STP-NIE/NTU(2008)
- Dikir Singapura dalam Rangka Exodus dan Genesis, Jurnal Akademik Jilid VIII, Singapura, STP-NIE/NTU (2008)
- Pembelot in "Aku Ingin Menulis: Panduan Mudah Menulis Cerpen” by Yazid Hussein. Asas 50 Press (2009)
- Pembelot in “Teman Siber” by (Ed.) Yazid Hussein. Angkatan Sasterawan ‘50
- Pengaruh bahasa dalam seni kata dikir Singapura in Jurnal Akademik Jilid IX Singapura, STP-NIE/NTU (2009)
- Representasi Puisi dalam pelbagai media dari sudut genetik in Jurnal Akademik Jilid IX Singapura, STP-NIE/NTU (2009)
- Hitam in “Kasih Bunga Merah”(2009)
- Muzik dan Pembelajaran: Satu penelitian in Jurnal Akademik Jilid IX Singapura, STP-NIE/NTU (2009)
- Bahasa, Muzik dan Media Baharu, Bahasa Sumber Intelektual Peribumi, Singapura, Angkatan Sasterawan ‘50 (2009)
- Menjunjung Titah, Berita Harian, Singapura, Singapore Press Holdings (2009)
- Aqmal N. (2017). Dumpra. Azizah Zakaria, National Arts Council. Singapura. ISBN 978-981-11-3972-7. OCLC 1029681404.
