= Law Song Seng =

Singaporean educator

Law Song Seng was the former director and CEO of Institute of Technical Education (ITE) in Singapore. Law had his education at Victoria School. He is widely known in Singapore as Mr ITE.

He was ITE's CEO for 25 years until his retirement in 2007 at the age of 62. After his retirement, he took on the role of chairman and CEO of ITE Education Services Pte Ltd.
