= S. Rajaratnam School of International Studies =

Graduate school and think tank in Singapore

- Sekolah Kajian Antarabangsa S. Rajaratnam (Malay) 拉惹勒南国际研究院 (Chinese) சின்னத்தம்பி ராஜரட்ணம் சர்வதேச ஆய்வு பள்ளி (Tamil)
- Former names: Institute of Defence and Strategic Studies (1996–2006)
- Type: Graduate school, think tank
- Established: 30 July 1996; 30 years ago (as Institute of Defence and Strategic Studies); 1 January 2007 (as RSIS)
- Parent institution: Nanyang Technological University
- Affiliations: APSIA
- Chairman: Tony Tan
- Dean: Kumar Ramakrishna
- Executive Deputy Chairman: Ong Keng Yong
- Location: 50 Nanyang Avenue, Block S4, Level B3, Singapore 639798, Nanyang Avenue, Singapore; 1°20′41″N 103°40′53″E
- Website: www.rsis.edu.sg

The S. Rajaratnam School of International Studies (RSIS) is an autonomous graduate school of Nanyang Technological University (NTU) in Singapore and a think tank focusing on strategic studies and security affairs. It was founded in 1996 as the Institute of Defence and Strategic Studies (IDSS) and was reconstituted under its present name on 1 January 2007. The school is named after S. Rajaratnam, Singapore's first foreign minister and a former deputy prime minister.

RSIS offers Master of Science programmes in strategic studies, international relations, international political economy and Asian studies, as well as a doctoral programme, and houses five research centres and three research programmes. It is a founding member of the Council on Foreign Relations' Council of Councils and hosts the secretariat of the Singapore committee of the Council for Security Cooperation in the Asia Pacific (CSCAP).

== History ==
=== Institute of Defence and Strategic Studies (1996–2006) ===
The Institute of Defence and Strategic Studies was established on the initiative of Tony Tan, then Deputy Prime Minister and Minister for Defence, to study the strategic environment of the Asia-Pacific after the end of the Cold War and to provide analysis for policymakers. Tan inaugurated the institute on 30 July 1996, and the former diplomat S. R. Nathan became its founding director. Nathan gave the institute the motto "Ponder the Improbable" and required its research to be relevant to policy.

In 1998 the institute launched its first degree programme, a Master of Science in Strategic Studies, which was followed by master's programmes in international relations and international political economy. During this period it also set up the International Centre for Political Violence and Terrorism Research and the Centre of Excellence for National Security. In 1999 it began the Asia-Pacific Programme for Senior Military Officers (APPSMO). Nathan became President of Singapore in 1999, and the former diplomat Barry Desker became director in October 2000. According to Nathan, the first master's cohort comprised ten Singaporean students; by 2006 the three master's programmes had 132 students, most of them from overseas.

=== S. Rajaratnam School of International Studies (2007–present) ===
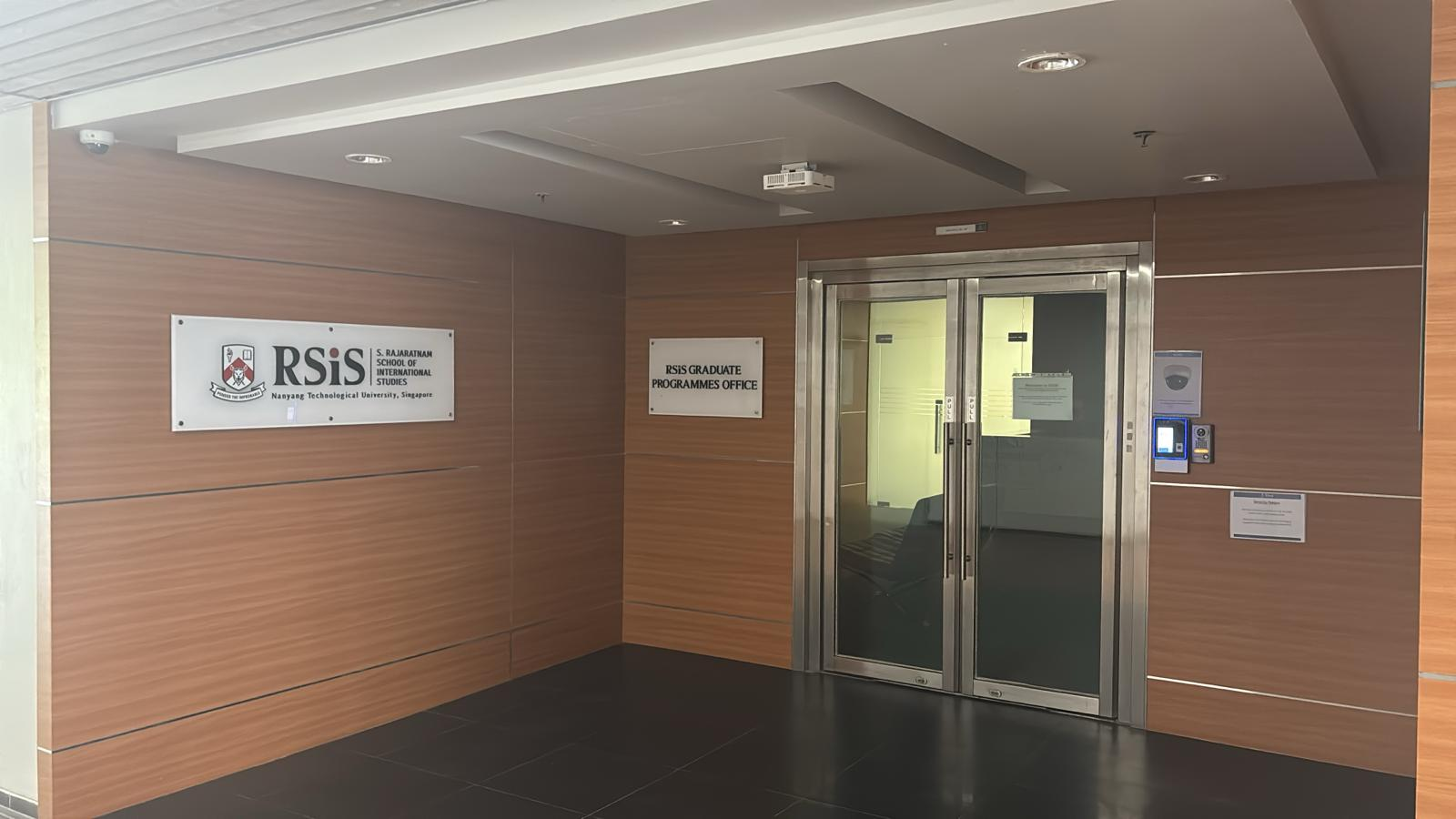
Block S4 of Nanyang Technological University, where RSIS is located

On 11 December 2006, at the institute's tenth-anniversary celebration, President Nathan announced the establishment of the S. Rajaratnam School of International Studies. The school began operating on 1 January 2007 as an autonomous graduate school of NTU, with IDSS continuing as one of its research centres.

In 2010 RSIS launched a double master's programme with the University of Warwick. In 2012 it became a founding member of the Council of Councils, of which it is the only Singaporean member.

On 3 November 2014 the school adopted a new leadership structure. Ong Keng Yong, a former Singaporean High Commissioner to Malaysia, became Executive Deputy Chairman and concurrently Director of IDSS; Joseph Liow, previously associate dean, became dean; and Desker, who had led the school for fourteen years, became a distinguished fellow. In July 2018 former president Tony Tan succeeded Eddie Teo as chairman of the school's board of governors.

RSIS held the first International Conference on Cohesive Societies (ICCS) in 2019. Kumar Ramakrishna became dean in January 2023 and was reappointed for a further three years from January 2026. The Social Cohesion Research Programme was set up in 2024. In 2026 the school marked 30 years since the founding of IDSS.

=== Leadership ===
Position	Name	Tenure
Founding Director, IDSS	S. R. Nathan	From 1996
Director, IDSS; head of RSIS	Barry Desker	October 2000 – November 2014
Executive Deputy Chairman	Ong Keng Yong	November 2014 – present

== Name ==
The school is named after S. Rajaratnam in recognition of his role as Singapore's first foreign minister, including in the country's admission to the United Nations and the building of its foreign service.

== Organisation ==
RSIS is overseen by a board of governors. For the term from January 2025 to December 2026 it is chaired by Tony Tan, with the Executive Deputy Chairman and the Dean as ex officio members; other members include permanent secretaries of several Singaporean government ministries, the vice-chancellor of the University of Warwick, and academics from the United States, Australia and elsewhere. The school's management is led by the Executive Deputy Chairman, assisted by the Dean and associate deans responsible for areas such as academic affairs and international engagement.

=== Research centres and programmes ===
As of 2026, RSIS comprises the following research centres and programmes:

Type	Name	Focus
Research centre	Institute of Defence and Strategic Studies (IDSS)	Geopolitical developments in the Asia-Pacific; the school's oldest and largest centre, with ten programmes covering China, humanitarian assistance and disaster relief, Indonesia, Malaysia, maritime security, military studies, military transformations, regional security architecture, South Asia and the United States
Research centre	International Centre for Political Violence and Terrorism Research (ICPVTR)	Politically motivated violence, terrorism and extremism; publishes the journal Counter Terrorist Trends and Analyses
Research centre	Centre of Excellence for National Security (CENS)	Cybersecurity, disinformation and emerging technologies
Research centre	Centre for Non-Traditional Security Studies (NTS Centre)	Climate, food, energy and health security, among other issues
Research centre	Centre for Multilateralism Studies (CMS)	Diplomatic, security and economic multilateralism
Research programme	National Security Studies Programme (NSSP)	
Research programme	Social Cohesion Research Programme (SCRP)	Established in 2024
Research programme	Studies in Inter-Religious Relations in Plural Societies Programme (SRP)	

The school also has a Future Issues and Technology (FIT) cluster, which studies emerging issues at the intersection of technology and national security, and in 2025 set up an energy research cluster.

== Academics ==
RSIS offers Master of Science programmes in Strategic Studies, International Relations, International Political Economy and Asian Studies. Under the double master's programme with the University of Warwick, students spend their first year in Warwick's Department of Politics and International Studies and their second year at RSIS in one of its master's programmes. The PhD programme covers strategic studies, international relations, defence and security management, and international political economy, and may be taken full-time or part-time, with a candidature of three to five years. RSIS is a member of the Association of Professional Schools of International Affairs (APSIA).

According to the school's annual review, 160 students graduated from its master's programmes and eight received doctorates in the 2024–25 academic year; in August 2025, 222 students from 21 countries enrolled in the master's programmes, along with four new PhD students.

== Endowed professorships ==
RSIS has four endowed professorships: the S. Rajaratnam Professorship in Strategic Studies, the Ngee Ann Kongsi Professorship in International Relations, the NTUC Professorship in International Economic Relations, and the Peter Lim Professorship in Peace Studies. According to its annual review, the school's endowment target is S$40 million, including matching grants from the Singapore government.

The S. Rajaratnam Professorship in Strategic Studies was established on 31 August 1998 with an endowment of S$2.6 million (excluding government matching funds) and is held by visiting scholars for short terms. Holders have included:

Year	Holder	Affiliation at the time
2000	Stephen Walt	Harvard University
2001	Jack L. Snyder	Columbia University
2002	Wang Jisi	Chinese Academy of Social Sciences
2003	Alastair Iain Johnston	Harvard University
2004	John Mearsheimer	University of Chicago
2005	C. Raja Mohan	Jawaharlal Nehru University
2006	Rosemary Foot	University of Oxford
2007	Richard K. Betts	Columbia University
2008	Neil MacFarlane	University of Oxford
2009	Bruce Hoffman	Georgetown University
2010	Peter J. Katzenstein	Cornell University
2010	Eliot A. Cohen	Johns Hopkins University
2011	Peter Feaver	Duke University
2013	Hugh White	Australian National University
2014	Andrew Hurrell	University of Oxford
2015	Stephen Peter Rosen	Harvard University
2016	Kent E. Calder	Johns Hopkins University
2016	Olli Heinonen	Harvard University
2017	Richard C. Bush	Brookings Institution
2018	Su Ge	Pacific Economic Cooperation Council
2019	John Esposito	Georgetown University
2023	Dominic Johnson	University of Oxford
2024	Shinichi Kitaoka	University of Tokyo, Rikkyo University
2024	M. Taylor Fravel	Massachusetts Institute of Technology
2025	Geoffrey Till	King's College London
2025	Hal Brands	Johns Hopkins University
2026	Steve Smith	—
2026	Robin Niblett	Chatham House

== Outreach ==
RSIS runs programmes for senior military and security officials from the Asia-Pacific. The Asia-Pacific Programme for Senior Military Officers (APPSMO) began in 1999 and held its 26th edition in October 2025; the 16th Asia-Pacific Programme for Senior National Security Officers (APPSNO) was held in April 2025. The International Conference on Cohesive Societies held in June 2025 drew more than 1,200 participants from over 50 countries.

The school serves as the secretariat of the Singapore committee of CSCAP, a Track II forum in which academics and officials acting in a private capacity discuss political and security issues in the Asia-Pacific. In December 1997 the CSCAP Singapore committee hosted the first CSCAP General Conference.

== Notable alumni ==
- Agus Harimurti Yudhoyono (MSc 2006) – Indonesian Coordinating Minister for Infrastructure and Regional Development; recipient of NTU's Nanyang Distinguished Alumni Award in 2025
- Tito Karnavian (PhD 2013) – former Chief of the Indonesian National Police and Indonesian Minister of Home Affairs from 2019
