= Kesavan Soon =

Singaporean sprinter

Kesavan Soon (born 1939) is a former Singaporean top sprinter. At the age of 17, when still studying at Victoria School, he was the only schoolboy selected to represent Singapore at the 1956 Melbourne Olympics. He took part in the 100 metres and 200 metres races. His coach was Singapore sprinter, Ali Ahmad. Kesavan was voted the most popular sportsman in Singapore and Malaya in 1956.

Kesavan joined the Singapore Armed Forces (SAF) in 1959 and rose to the rank of lieutenant-colonel in 1972. He was also the commanding officer of the School of Infantry Section Leaders. He retired from the army in 1991. He also served in the Singapore Amateur Athletics Association as a vice-president in the early 1970s and in the early 1980s.
