= Po'ad bin Shaik Abu Bakar Mattar =

Singaporean academic

Po'ad bin Shaik Abu Bakar Mattar (born c. 1948) is a Singaporean accountant. He has served as Pro-Chancellor of the National University of Singapore since 2012. He was a member of the Council of Presidential Advisers (CPA) from January 2007 to January 2021.

== Early life and education ==
He graduated with a Bachelor of Accountancy from the University of Singapore and holds a Master in Management from the Asian Institute of Management. He is also a Chartered Accountant registered with the Institute of Singapore Chartered Accountants.

== Career ==
Po'ad joined the local predecessor firm of Deloitte, Haskins & Sells in 1971 and later became a managing partner in the firm.

He was appointed a member of the Council of Presidential Advisers in January 2007 and served until January 2021. In January 2017, he was sworn in and re-appointed as a member of the CPA at the Istana in a ceremony officiated by President Tony Tan Keng Yam.

In 2012, he was appointed Pro-Chancellor of the National University of Singapore. In 2023, he was listed as a member of the Public Service Commission.
