= Daryl Aiden Yow =

Daryl Aiden Yow is a Singapore-based Instagram marketer and photographer who has worked with brands such as Sony, Oppo and Uniqlo. Yow became known on social media as style influencer Andrea Chong's Instagram photographer since 2015. He has accrued more than 100,000 followers on Instagram as of June 2018.

== Plagiarism scandal ==
Yow gained widespread media attention in June 2018 after some of the images on his Instagram account and personal website were discovered to be edited or composited photos made from stock images, or from images found on sites such as Pinterest and Reddit. Acting on a tip-off, Singapore-based news site Mothership.sg broke the story on 20 June, providing, in two articles, 21 examples of plagiarised photos, together with their originals, including 10 examples in which Yow was digitally added onto the scene. Many photographs carried captions implying authorship, such as "Hours well spent waiting for this!"; one photograph was claimed to be taken with a Sony camera that Yow was engaged to advertise.

The revelations provoked a strong response from members in the local photography and blogging communities, such as Xiaxue and Mrbrown, who condemned Yow for misleading his audience. In response to the allegations of plagiarism, Yow claimed that the image rights have been purchased and that his commercial clients were aware that stock images were used in the collaborative social media posts. He also defended the captions on his Instagram posts, saying he had never claimed that they "were taken live at the scene depicted". Sony Singapore and Uniqlo have declined to comment on whether they were aware of the stock image usage.

Subsequent to the widespread circulation of the story, on 21 June, Yow removed all images from his Instagram feed and issued a statement in which he apologised for making use of others' photographs and misleading his followers with false captions. He maintained that the "end-products" of his collaborations with his friends "remained honest and fair".

On social media, the Daryl Aiden Challenge emerged, which entailed digitally adding oneself into the scene depicted by a stock photo. Corporate brands such as the budget airline Scoot, F&N Seasons and Shopee, and bloggers like Xiaxue updated their social media accounts with posts parodying the incident.

The media attention in June allowed Yow to gain greater popularity and thousands of additional followers by the time he resumed uploading posts to his Instagram feed on 14 September. Yow's first post after the hiatus featured an image of burning prints of the plagiarised photos being thrown into the air. In the same post and in disappearing stories, behind-the-scene videos and photos of the shoot were posted, demonstrating the veracity of the images.
