= A Singapore Dementia Story =

- Directed by: Gavin Lim (Another Go); Jenny Ng (Really?); Raymus Chang (Two Ways to Forget); Vikneshwaran Silva (The Last Thread); Andie Chen (What Day Is It?)
- Written by: Kate Pang (What Day Is It?)
- Produced by: Daniel Yun
- Starring: Tan Kheng Hua; Peter Yu; Lim Shi-An; Bernard Lim; Suhaimi Yusof; A. Panneeirchelvam; Alaric Tay; Oon Shu An
- Release date: 31 January 2026
- Country: Singapore

A Singapore Dementia Story is a 2026 Singaporean anthology film, consisting of five short film segments directed by Gavin Lim, Jenny Ng, Raymus Chang, Vikneshwaran Silva and Andie Chen. The film is curated and produced by Daniel Yun, the cast included Tan Kheng Hua, Lim Shi-An, A. Panneeirchelvam, Alaric Tay, Oon Shu An and the voices of Bernard Lim and Suhaimi Yusof.

The film is presented by the Lien Foundation and Dementia Singapore.

== Plot ==
=== Another Go ===
Leon and Georgia Lim are a couple coping with early-onset dementia. Georgia, a chemistry professor, has dementia while their daughter copes with her mother's struggling to remember who she is.

=== Really? ===
A filial son who gives up his job to take care of his mum with dementia.

=== Two Ways to Forget ===
An AI animated short film about a successful lawyer hiding his dementia while a math teacher accepting his.

=== The Last Thread ===
A retired soldier struggles with his guilt, grief and a painful family event, relived through his dementia.

=== What Day Is It? ===
John and Sophia are a couple coping with John getting more and more forgetful.

== Cast ==
- Tan Kheng Hua
- Peter Yu
- Lim Shi-An
- Bernard Lim
- Suhaimi Yusof
- A. Panneeirchelvam
- Alaric Tay
- Oon Shu An

== Production ==
The film is produced by Daniel Yun and presented by the Lien Foundation and Dementia Singapore.

Andie Chen made his directorial debut with the short film What Day Is It? with his wife Kate Pang as the screenwriter. For What Day Is It?, it had only two months from scriptwriting to production but Alaric Tay took two weeks to decide to take up the role, which frustrated both Chen and Pang as they only chose Tay to portray John in their short film. Pang threatened to cancel the production if Tay refused to take the role. Tay explained that, as this was the first time he had been offered to play a character with dementia, he took time to carefully review the script before agreeing to the part.

== Release ==
The film was premiered on 22 January 2026 at Temasek Shophouse, Singapore with a private screening. Two free public screenings are to be held on 31 January 2026.
