= Minister Mentor =

Singaporean cabinet post overseeing government transitions

Minister Mentor of the Republic of Singapore
- Coat of arms of Singapore

- Flag of Singapore

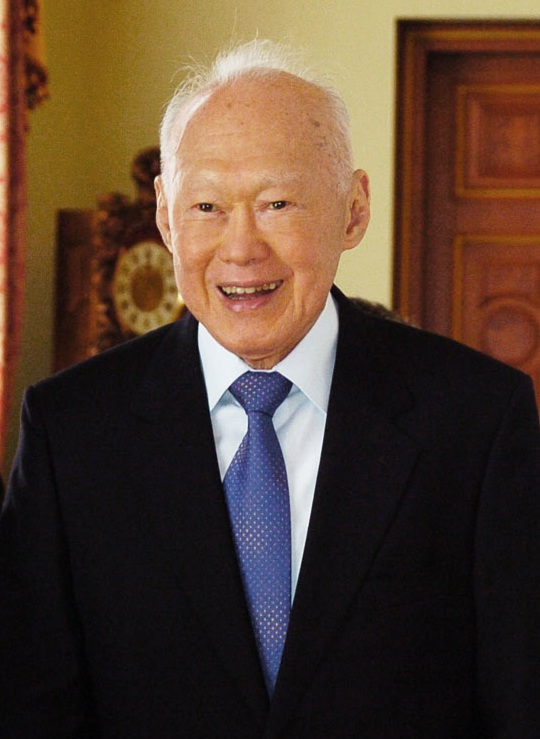
- Only office holder Lee Kuan Yew; 12 September 2004 – 21 May 2011
- Style: Minister Mentor (informal); The Honourable (formal); His Excellency (diplomatic)
- Abbreviation: MM
- Appointer: Prime Minister of Singapore
- Formation: 12 September 2004; 21 years ago
- First holder: Lee Kuan Yew
- Final holder: Lee Kuan Yew
- Abolished: 21 May 2011; 15 years ago

The minister mentor of Singapore (Note: Malay: Menteri Mentor Republik Singapura, Chinese: 新加坡内阁资政; pinyin: Xīnjiāpō Nèigé Zīzhèng, Tamil: சிங்கப்பூர் மதியுரை அமைச்சர், romanized: Ciṅkappūr Mathiyurai Amaichar) was a high-ranking appointment within the Cabinet of Singapore. The founding prime minister, Lee Kuan Yew, served as the first and sole occupant of the office, assuming the role at the age of 80 after almost 14 years as a senior minister. He held this office until his retirement from the Cabinet in 2011.

== Background ==
The position was established by Lee Hsien Loong upon succeeding Goh Chok Tong as Prime Minister in August 2004. Although the existing office of Senior Minister was already designated for advising the Executive, the title of Minister Mentor was specifically created to accommodate a dual-generational transition within the Cabinet. When Goh vacated the premiership, he assumed the role of Senior Minister in accordance with political tradition; however, because Lee Kuan Yew had already held that exact title for 14 years, the post of Minister Mentor was institutionalised so both former heads of government could concurrently offer advisory counsel.

Prior to this appointment, Lee Kuan Yew had served as Senior Minister from 1990 to 2004 throughout successive iterations of Goh's Cabinet. Goh subsequently assumed the Senior Minister portfolio within the First Lee Hsien Loong Cabinet immediately after stepping down. On 14 May 2011, a week after the general election, both elder statesmen issued a joint declaration announcing their retirement from the Cabinet to facilitate a leadership renewal, though they remained in Parliament as backbenchers until Lee's death in 2015 and Goh's retirement from politics in 2020 respectively. The position of Minister Mentor hasn't been used ever since.
