= Singapore Land Authority =

Statutory board in Singapore

Agency overview
- Formed: 1 June 2001; 25 years ago
- Preceding agency: Land Office, Singapore Land Registry, Survey Department and Land Systems Support Unit
- Jurisdiction: Government of Singapore
- Headquarters: 55 Newton Road, Revenue House #12-01, Singapore 307987
- Agency executives: Loh Lik Peng, Chairman; Calvin Phua, Chief Executive
- Parent agency: Ministry of Law
- Website: www.sla.gov.sg
- Agency ID: T08GB0053B

The Singapore Land Authority (SLA) is a statutory board under the Ministry of Law of the Government of Singapore. SLA optimises land resources for Singapore's social and economic development.

== History ==
The SLA was formed on 1 June 2001 when the Land Office, Singapore Land Registry, Survey Department and Land Systems Support Unit were merged.

== Role ==
With the vision of 'Limited Land, Unlimited Space', SLA is responsible for maximising Singapore's land resources, by:

- Optimising land and space utilisation,
- Safeguarding property ownership, and
- Promoting the use of land-space data through geospatial.

SLA has two functional roles: developmental and regulatory.

- Developmental: SLA oversees the management of 11,000 hectares of state land and 2,700 state properties. SLA is also responsible for land sales, leasing, land acquisitions and allocation, developing and marketing land-related information and maintaining the national land information database.
- Regulatory: SLA is the national land registration authority, and is responsible for the management and maintenance of the national land survey system, to define the boundaries and legal limits of properties in Singapore.

SLA also operates GeoWorks, Southeast Asia's first geospatial industry centre. As a co-working space, GeoWorks aims to nurture and strengthen the geospatial ecosystem in Singapore and beyond, bringing together MNCs, scale-ups and government agencies through partnership, collaboration and innovation. The GeoWorks GeoInnovation Programme is home to more than 20 startups and scale-ups in geospatial and related domains, including artificial intelligence, drones, autonomous vehicles, augmented reality, virtual reality, geospatial analysis, satellite imagery and route optimisation. GeoWorks is located at mTower.

== State-managed Properties ==
Notable properties managed by SLA include:

- Gillman Barracks
- Dempsey Hill (former Tanglin Village)
- Kallang Airport
- Tanjong Pagar Railway Station
- Former Bukit Timah Fire Station
- Changi Hospital
- Temasek Shophouse
- Turf City
- 5 Kadayanallur Street (former St. Andrew’s Mission Hospital)
- 45 Sultan Gate at Kampong Glam
- Close to 500 Black and White Bungalows across Singapore, including Scotts Road, Goodwood Hill, Bukit Timah, Alexandra Park, Sembawang, Malcolm Park, Changi and Seletar
- St. John’s Island, Lazarus Island and Kusu Island

== See also ==
- SiReNT
- Virtual Singapore
