= Oon Shu An =

Singaporean actress and host (born 1986)

- Born: Oon Shu An; 5 August 1986 (age 40); Singapore
- Education: Methodist Girls' School
- Alma mater: LASALLE College of the Arts
- Occupations: Actress; host
- Years active: 2006–present

Chinese name
- Traditional Chinese: 溫淑安
- Simplified Chinese: 温淑安
- Hanyu Pinyin: Wēn Shū'ān
- Website: Oon Shu An on Facebook

Oon Shu An (born 5 August 1986) is a Singaporean actress and host. She is the web-show host of Clicknetwork.tv's Tried and Tested.

== Early life and education ==
Concerned about her shyness, Oon's parents enrolled her in speech and drama classes at the age of six, which became a pivotal step in nurturing her confidence and interest in acting. She continued to immerse herself in the arts throughout her schooling years, participating in the primary school choir and joining the drama club during her secondary education. Her passion for performance deepened as she became involved with Buds Youth Theatre and later joined the drama club in junior college.

Oon was educated at Methodist Girls' School. She graduated from the LASALLE College of the Arts, majoring in acting.

== Filmography ==
Oon has appeared in numerous Singaporean feature films, short films and television shows. She is also the host of Tried and Tested on Clicknetwork.tv.

=== Film ===
Year	Title	Role	Notes	Ref.
2006	Becoming Royston	Ah Girl	Feature film	
2009	Kitchen Quartet	Shu An	Short film	
2010	Left Hook	Sonya	Short film	
2010	Love in a Cab	May	Telemovie	
2013	Mister John	Janjira	Feature film	
2014	Common Space	Sally	Telemovie	
2014	Rubbers	Kawaii Momoko	Feature film	
2015	Our Sister Mambo	Rose Wong	Feature film	
2016	4 LOVE	Ye Lin	Feature film	
2018	Republic of Food	Miss Mo	Feature film	
2022	LookAtMe	Dr. Jamie Lee	Feature film	
2022	Smoke Gets in Your Eyes	Noelle	Feature film	
2025	Children's Day	Mummy	Short film	
2026	A Singapore Dementia Story		Short film	

=== Television ===
Year	Title	Role	Notes	Ref.
2011	The Kitchen Musical	Paula		
2012	Game Plan	Bride at the station	Cameo	
2013	Random Island	Numerous		
2014	Marco Polo	Jing Fei		
2015	Code of Law	Stephanie Szeto		
2016	Mata Mata	Patricia Yeo		
2016	Yes Mdm	Yang Lei		
2017	You Deserve a Break	—N/a	As host	
2017	Meet The MP	Melissa		
2019	I'm Madam (女友变身记)	Pepper Hu		
2021	The Cheaters App	Vanessa Ang		
2024	The Last Bout	Kit Wong		

== Theatre ==
Oon's one-woman show, #UnicornMoment, which she wrote and performed, with Checkpoint Theatre, was picked a highlight of 2014's local theatre offerings by The Straits Times, and nominated for best original script at the Life! Theatre Awards in 2015. Oon has been nominated twice for the best actress award at the Life! Theatre Awards, Singapore's de facto national theatre awards in 2019 for her lead role in Mergers and Accusations, and in 2016 for the role of Xi Yan in the play Chinglish at the Life! Theatre Awards.

Year	Title	Role	Notes
2024	Tartuffe: The Imposter	Mariane	W!ld Rice
2024	Grounded	The Pilot	Grounded
2023	Hotel	Multiple Roles	HOTEL
2022	The Fourth Trimester	Ann	Checkpoint Threate
2022	Tartuffe: The Imposter	Mariane	W!ld Rice
2021	Lungs	The Couple	Singapore Theatre Company
2020	The Heart Comes to Mind (Audio)	Lynn	Checkpoint Theatre
2019	This is What Happens to Pretty Girls	Female Lead	Pangdemonium!
2019	Mergers and Accusations	Ellen	Esplanade Presents: The Studios
2017	Army Daze 2	BG Wong S A	Michael Chiang Playthings
2017	Boeing Boeing	Ms SQ - Jeanette	W!LD RICE
2015	Normal	Sarah Hew	Checkpoint Theatre
2015	Chinglish	Xi Yan	Pangdemonium
2014	Unicorn Moment	Monologue - Performer & writer	Checkpoint Theatre
2014	Con$umed		Edith Podesta
	The King Lear Project: A Trilogy	Cordelia	Ho Tzu Nyen, Fran Borgia
2012	City Night Songs	Denise	Checkpoint Theatre
2013	Machine	Lena	Orangedot Productions co-produced by Esplanade Theatres
2012	Incanto	The Seeker	Resorts World Sentosa
	When the Bough Breaks	Susan	The Necessary Stage
2011	Paperboat		TheatreStrays
2010	The Lower Depths	The actor	TheatreStrays
2010	Galileo	Andrea Sarti	Stefanos Rassios
