= Rubbers (film) =

2014 film by Han Yew Kwang

- Film poster
- 套
- Directed by: Han Yew Kwang
- Written by: Han Yew Kwang
- Produced by: Lau Chee Nien
- Starring: Marcus Chin; Julian Hee; Lee Chau Min; Oon Shu An; Catherine Sng; Alaric Tay; Yeo Yann Yann
- Cinematography: Liu Long Fei
- Edited by: Jack Shuo
- Music by: August Lum
- Production company: 18g Pictures
- Distributed by: Golden Village
- Release date: December 12, 2014 (SGIFF)
- Running time: 83 minutes
- Country: Singapore
- Language: Mandarin
- Budget: S$500,000
- Box office: US$82,510 (Singapore)

Rubbers is a 2014 Singaporean sex comedy film written and directed by Han Yew Kwang. It stars Marcus Chin, Julian Hee, Lee Chau Min, Oon Shu An, Catherine Sng, Alaric Tay, and Yeo Yann Yann as Singaporeans who are faced with various problems in their sex lives related to condoms. The film is split into three shorts whose scenes are interwoven. It premiered at the Singapore International Film Festival on 12 December 2014. Golden Village released it theatrically on 30 April 2015, in Singapore, where it grossed $82,510.

== Plot ==
On Valentine's Day, various Singaporeans face issues in their sex lives that are related to condoms: a man who refuses to wear condoms fantasises about a Japanese pornographic film star, a woman who has been single for several years takes advice from a talking condom who tells her to seduce her younger plumber, and an elderly couple try to save their marriage through.

== Cast ==
- Marcus Chin as Ah Niu
- Julian Hee as Thor
- Lee Chau Min as Durian Condom
- Oon Shu An as Kawaii Momoko
- Catherine Sng as Ah Hua
- Alaric Tay as Adam
- Yeo Yann Yann as Baoling
- Gillian Tan as Eve

== Production ==
Han had previously made several romantic comedy films and was looking for a new topic. He settled on a sex comedy as more realistic logistically than an action comedy or horror comedy. Han said his intention was to make a film that would encourage people to use condoms. The film cost S$500,000 to make and included a crowdfunding campaign for $9,000. The original goal was US$25,000, but they still considered the funding a success, as it raised awareness for the film.

Oon watched pornographic films to prepare for her role as a Japanese pornographic actress. Oon was initially reluctant to take the role, but her boyfriend encouraged her, saying that the role is funny. Yeo also was reluctant to join the film, as she had recently given birth and cited tiredness. Yeo called the role "one of my most daring roles to date". Sng said her character's story is partly based on a real-life experience in which a friend tricked her into thinking a colored condom was a balloon.

Han said the film's content caused them to miss out on some locations they wanted, but the cast and crew were willing to work with him. Shooting was tricky, because Han wanted to avoid explicit nudity as much as possible. To facilitate camera angles, Han requested two crew members who were in a relationship act as stand-ins.

== Release ==
Rubbers premiered at the Singapore International Film Festival on 12 December 2014. Golden Village released it theatrically on 30 April 2015, in Singapore, where it grossed $82,510. Han did not contest the film's R21 rating despite its effect on sales. Though it is one of Han's highest-grossing films, it did not recoup its budget. Han said that filmmaking has become a hobby for him, as it is impossible to make money from his films.

== Reception ==
Jocelyn Lee of The New Paper rated it 3/5 stars and recommended it "for some light-hearted fun". Benita Lee of Time Out Singapore rated it 3/5 stars and wrote, "At times, it feels like a flimsy disguise for a condom or safe sex ad, but it admittedly has its moments." Derek Elley of Film Business Asia rated it 5/10 stars and wrote that it "develops a typically Southeast Asian sweetness in its second half that goes a long way to excusing some of the movie's more juvenile moments". Clarence Tsui of The Hollywood Reporter wrote, "With a few strokes of superb social satire ... Rubbers offers raucous, base and unwieldy entertainment." Tsui describes how the film "offers a timely illustration" of Singaporean culture, as its inhibited scenes are still seen as subversive.
