= Clicknetwork.tv =

Online video network based in Singapore

clicknetwork.tv
- Industry: Entertainment
- Founded: 2007
- Headquarters: Singapore
- Website: clicknetwork.tv

clicknetwork.tv was an online video network founded in 2007 and based in Singapore. The network produced original short-form, reality, lifestyle and comedic video content. It is part of the Maker Studios network. The network has been defunct since July 2022, after posting its final video under Tyen Rasif's No Sweat series.

== Circulation ==
clicknetwork.tv videos are available via the network's website, YouTube, and dedicated mobile applications. It was the most subscribed and most viewed YouTube channel based in Singapore.

== Controversies ==
In April 2008, clicknetwork.tv released a video of blogger Xiaxue reviewing the newly released Apple iPhone. The negative review (which started with a fake China-made iPhone) generated over 300,000 hits within days. It was also mentioned by Fake Steve Jobs as the 'worst iPhone review so far'.

clicknetwork.tv has also been mentioned numerous times in the Singapore local media for its suggestive videos.

== Content ==
Some of the regulars of the network include the blogger Xiaxue, actress Oon Shu An, and comedian Irene Ang from Fly Entertainment.
