= SiReNT =

Singaporean reference station network infrastructure

The Singapore Satellite Positioning Reference Network (SiReNT), is an infrastructure network launched by the Survey Services section of the Singapore Land Authority in 2006. Its purpose is to define Singapore's official spatial reference framework and to support the cadastral system in SVY21. It is a multi-purpose high precision positioning infrastructure which provides both Post Process Differential Global Positioning System (DGPS) DGPS services and Real Time DGPS services. The system supports all types of GPS positioning modes and formats.

SiReNT comprises five GPS reference stations connected to a data control centre at government data centre. Four of the five reference stations are located at the extreme corners of the island of Singapore, with the fifth located in the centre of the island. The four external reference stations are located at Nanyang Technological University, Keppel Club, Loyang, and Senoko, with the designations SNTU, SKEP, SLOY, and SSEK, respectively. The central location is at Nanyang Polytechnic, designated by SNYP. The entire set-up is made up of advanced GPS equipment and sophisticated computer hardware, software, communications and network.

SiReNT supports a great variety of applications. It provides data reliability, efficiency and productivity of survey work for land surveyors with the aid of GPS technology. It also offers a wide range of GPS data services with various accuracy levels ranging from metres to centimetres to suit different applications from positioning to tracking and monitoring.

These GPS reference stations receive satellite signals 24 hours a day and transmit GPS data continuously to the data control centre for storage and processing. Corrections processed from the data are then streamed to subscribed users.

SiReNT offers 4 types of services, namely Post Processing (PP) On-Demand, Post Processing (PP) Archive, Real Time Kinematic (RTK) and low accuracy Differential Global Positioning System (DGPS) to suit different applications. In 2010, SiReNT introduced support for telematics and structural monitoring solutions.
