= Senior Minister of Singapore =

Cabinet position in the Government of Singapore

Senior Minister of the Republic of Singapore
- Coat of arms of Singapore

- Flag of Singapore

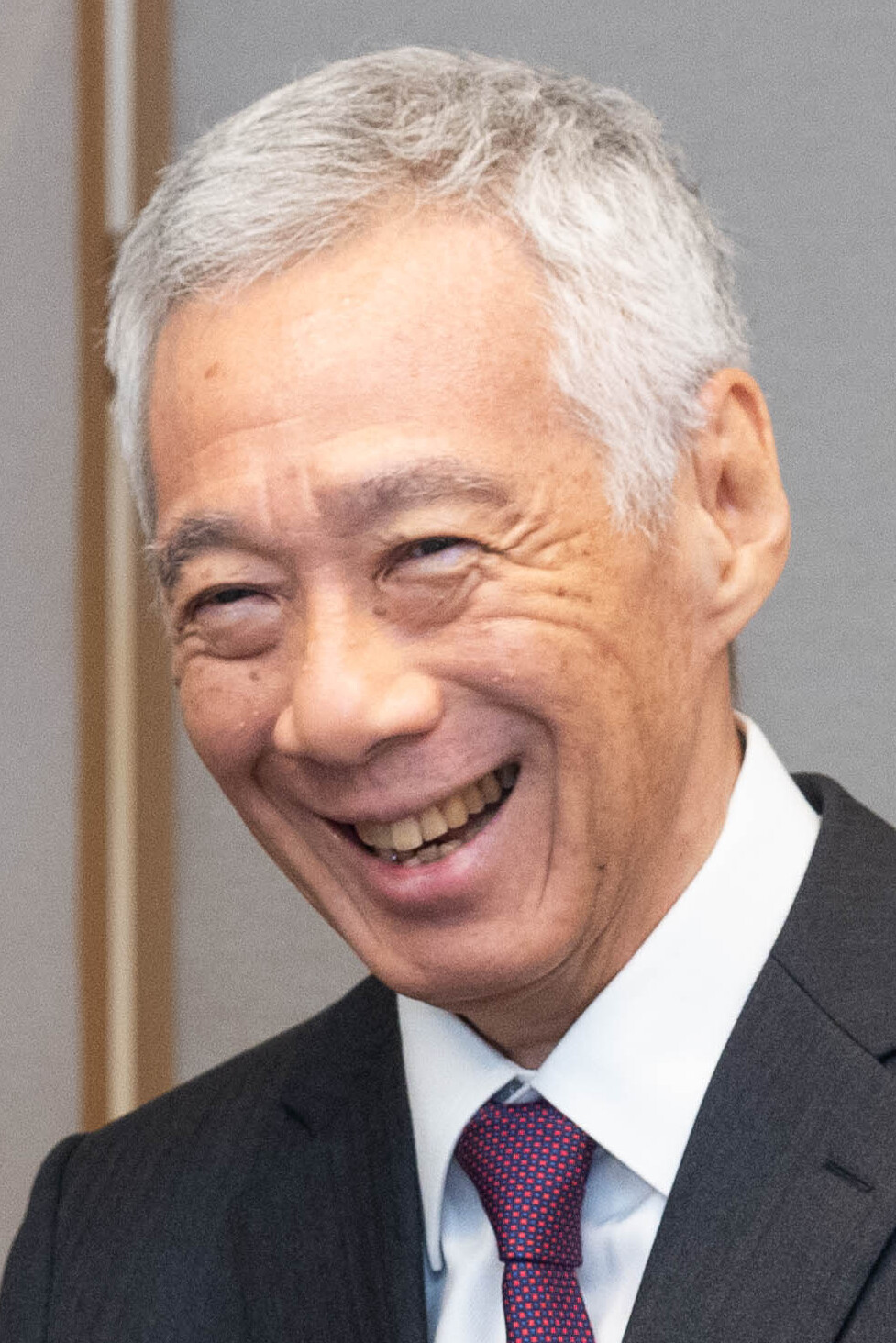
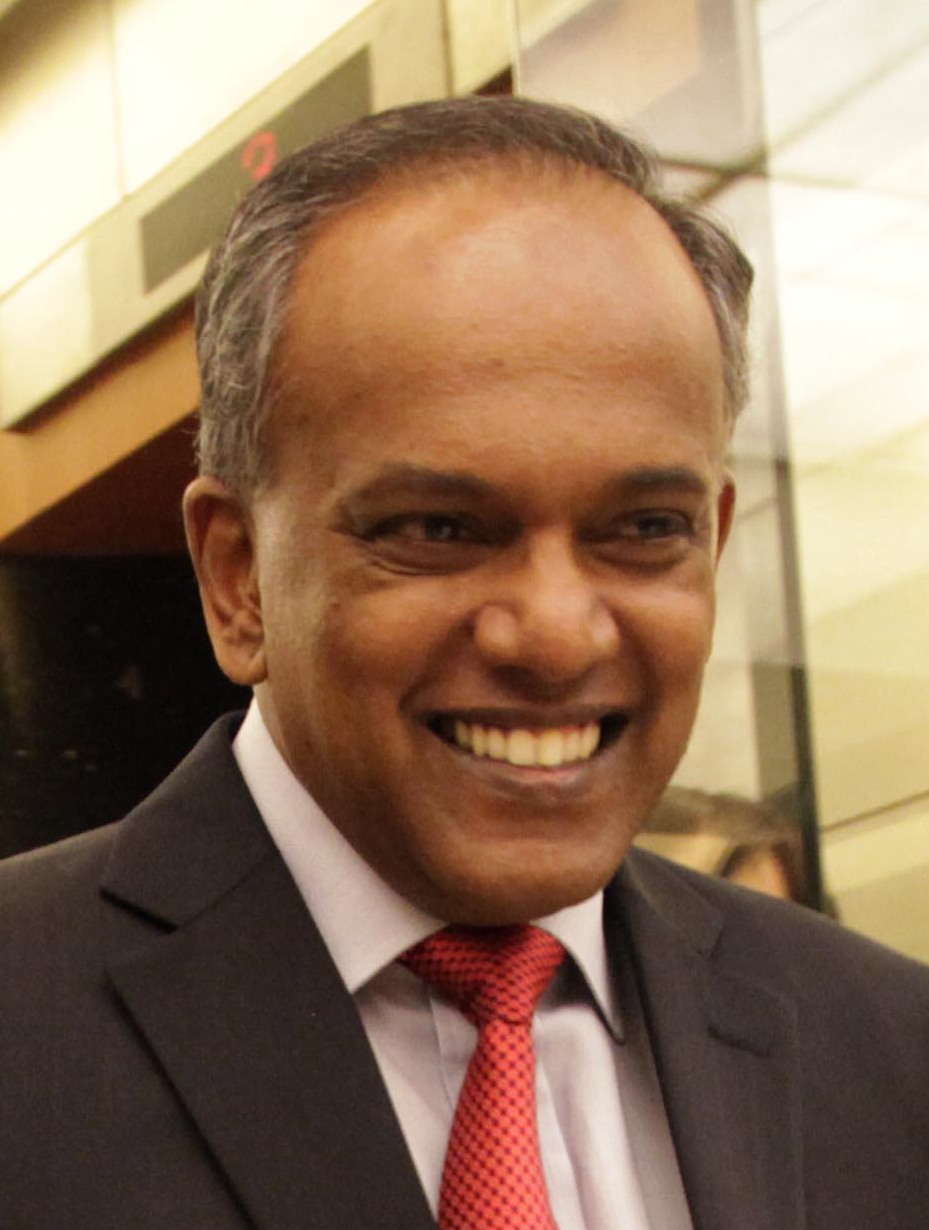
- Incumbent; Lee Hsien Loong since 15 May 2024; K. Shanmugam since 27 July 2026
- Prime Minister's Office
- Style: Senior Minister (informal); The Honourable (formal); His Excellency (diplomatic)
- Abbreviation: SM
- Appointer: Prime Minister of Singapore
- Term length: At the Prime Minister's pleasure
- Formation: 2 January 1985; 41 years ago
- First holder: S. Rajaratnam
- Website: www.pmo.gov.sg

The senior minister of Singapore (Note: Malay: Menteri Kanan Republik Singapura, Chinese: 新加坡国务资政; pinyin: Xīnjiāpō Guówù Zī Zhèng, Tamil: சிங்கப்பூர் மூத்த அமைச்சர், romanized: Ciṅkappūr Mooththa Amaichar) is a high-ranking appointment within the Cabinet of Singapore. Established in 1985, the position has historically been occupied by former prime ministers or deputy prime ministers upon stepping down from their respective offices and occasionally very long tenured cabinet ministers. As of 2026, eight individuals have held the post, with all appointees being over the age of 60 at the time of their appointment.

The role does not typically carry a specific ministerial portfolio. Instead, senior ministers serve as elder statesmen within the government, oversee specialised national councils, and occasionally represent the country in international diplomacy. Among the executive branch officeholders in the order of precedence, the position ranks after the prime minister and the deputy prime minister. They also serve as part of the Prime Minister's Office (PMO) and work at the Istana.

== History and background ==
S. Rajaratnam, Singapore's first Minister for Foreign Affairs, took on the newly created role of Senior Minister in 1985 before retiring in 1988. Prior to that, he served as Deputy Prime Minister between 1980 and 1985.

Lee Kuan Yew, Singapore's first Prime Minister, was appointed as Senior Minister in 1990, after being succeeded by Goh Chok Tong as prime minister. He was ranked second in the order of precedence, superseding the incumbent Deputy Prime Ministers Lee Hsien Loong and Ong Teng Cheong. Goh was appointed Senior Minister in 2004 after handing over the office of Prime Minister to Lee Hsien Loong. As Senior Minister, he was ranked second in the order of precedence, while Lee Kuan Yew, who was appointed as Minister Mentor, ranked third in the order of precedence.

S. Jayakumar relinquished his role as Deputy Prime Minister in 2009, subsequently serving as Senior Minister until his retirement from politics in 2011. Following the 2011 general election, Minister Mentor Lee Kuan Yew and Senior Minister Goh stepped down from the Cabinet but retained their parliamentary seats. While Goh accepted the honorary title of Emeritus Senior Minister (ESM), Lee declined a similar offer and continued serving as a Member of Parliament until his death on 23 March 2015. Goh eventually retired from politics ahead of the 2020 general election.

Between 21 May 2011 and 1 May 2019, the office of Senior Minister was vacant. After this eight-year gap, Teo Chee Hean and Tharman Shanmugaratnam were appointed after they both relinquished their positions as Deputy Prime Minister.

On 8 June 2023, Tharman Shanmugaratnam announced his intention to run for the 2023 presidential election and his scheduled resignation on 7 July 2023 from all his positions in the government and as a member of the People's Action Party, as the presidency is a non-partisan office. Lee Hsien Loong was appointed Senior Minister on 15 May 2024 after handing over the office of Prime Minister to Lawrence Wong. Teo announced his retirement from politics ahead of the 2025 general election.

=== Emeritus Senior Minister ===
The Emeritus Senior Minister (ESM) is an honorary title created in 2011 for Singapore's second prime minister, Goh Chok Tong, following his retirement from the Cabinet after the 2011 general election. Modelled after the academic tradition of an "Emeritus Professor," the prefix was conferred by prime minister Lee Hsien Loong to preserve Goh's "diplomatic stature on the international stage" while "allowing a younger generation of leaders a fresh slate to govern." The title is strictly honorific, meaning it carries no executive power, no seat in the Cabinet and no ministerial salary. Although Goh retired completely from politics in 2020, he remains the sole bearer of the title and its abbreviation in public life.

== List of senior ministers ==
The Senior Minister is appointed as part of the Cabinet of Singapore. The incumbent Senior Minister is Lee Hsien Loong, an MP for Ang Mo Kio GRC and K. Shanmugam, an MP for Nee Soon GRC from the governing People's Action Party.

No.	Portrait	Name Constituency (Birth–Death)	Term of office		Political party	Prime Minister	Cabinet
No.	Portrait	Name Constituency (Birth–Death)	Took office	Left office	Political party	Prime Minister	Cabinet
1		S. Rajaratnam; MP for Kampong Glam (1915–2006)	2 January 1985	13 September 1988	PAP	Lee Kuan Yew	Lee K. VII
Vacant (13 September 1988 – 28 November 1990)						Lee Kuan Yew	Lee K. VIII
2		Lee Kuan Yew; MP for Tanjong Pagar GRC (1923–2015)	28 November 1990	7 September 1991	PAP	Goh Chok Tong	Goh I
2		Lee Kuan Yew; MP for Tanjong Pagar GRC (1923–2015)	7 September 1991	25 January 1997	PAP	Goh Chok Tong	Goh II
2		Lee Kuan Yew; MP for Tanjong Pagar GRC (1923–2015)	25 January 1997	23 November 2001	PAP	Goh Chok Tong	Goh III
2		Lee Kuan Yew; MP for Tanjong Pagar GRC (1923–2015)	23 November 2001	12 August 2004	PAP	Goh Chok Tong	Goh IV
3		Goh Chok Tong; MP for Marine Parade GRC (born 1941)	12 August 2004	30 May 2006	PAP	Lee Hsien Loong	Lee H. I
3		Goh Chok Tong; MP for Marine Parade GRC (born 1941)	30 May 2006	21 May 2011	PAP	Lee Hsien Loong	Lee H. II
4		S. Jayakumar; MP for East Coast GRC (born 1939)	1 April 2009	21 May 2011	PAP	Lee Hsien Loong	Lee H. II
Vacant (21 May 2011 – 1 October 2015)						Lee Hsien Loong	Lee H. III
Vacant (1 October 2015 – 1 May 2019)						Lee Hsien Loong	Lee H. IV
5		Teo Chee Hean; MP for Pasir Ris–Punggol GRC (born 1954)	1 May 2019	27 July 2020	PAP	Lee Hsien Loong	Lee H. IV
6		Tharman Shanmugaratnam; MP for Jurong GRC (born 1957)	1 May 2019	27 July 2020	PAP	Lee Hsien Loong	Lee H. IV
(5)		Teo Chee Hean; MP for Pasir Ris–Punggol GRC (born 1954)	27 July 2020	15 May 2024	PAP	Lee Hsien Loong	Lee H. V
(6)		Tharman Shanmugaratnam; MP for Jurong GRC (born 1957)	27 July 2020	7 July 2023	PAP	Lee Hsien Loong	Lee H. V
(5)		Teo Chee Hean; MP for Pasir Ris–Punggol GRC (born 1954)	15 May 2024	23 May 2025	PAP	Lawrence Wong	Wong I
7		Lee Hsien Loong; MP for Ang Mo Kio GRC (born 1952)	15 May 2024	23 May 2025	PAP	Lawrence Wong	Wong I
7		Lee Hsien Loong; MP for Ang Mo Kio GRC (born 1952)	23 May 2025	Incumbent	PAP	Lawrence Wong	Wong II
8	K. Shanmugam	K. Shanmugam; MP for Nee Soon GRC (born 1959)	27 July 2026	Incumbent	PAP	Lawrence Wong	Wong II

== See also ==
- Prime Minister of Singapore
- Prime Minister's Office (PMO)
- Deputy Prime Minister of Singapore
- Minister Mentor
