= Xiaxue =

Singaporean online and television personality

- 下雪
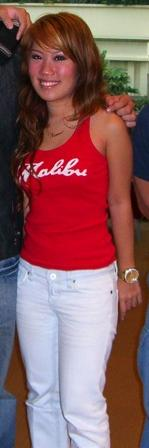
- Xiaxue at the National Library in September 2005
- Born: Wendy Cheng Yan Yan; 28 April 1984 (age 42); Teban Gardens, Singapore
- Other name: Wendy Cheng
- Citizenship: Singaporean
- Education: Diploma in Mass Media
- Alma mater: River Valley High School; Singapore Polytechnic
- Occupations: Blogger; online television personality
- Years active: 2003–present
- Known for: well-known female Singaporean blogger
- Height: 1.48 m (4 ft 10 in)
- Spouse: Mike Sayre (m. 2010; div. 2023)
- Children: Dashiel Sayre (son)

Chinese name
- Traditional Chinese: 下雪
- Simplified Chinese: 下雪
- Literal meaning: falling snow
Transcriptions
Standard Mandarin
- Hanyu Pinyin: xiàxuě
- IPA: [ɕjâ.ɕɥè]

Wendy Cheng
- Traditional Chinese: 鄭彥彥
- Simplified Chinese: 郑彦彦
Transcriptions
Standard Mandarin
- Hanyu Pinyin: Zhèng Yànyàn
- Website: xiaxue.blogspot.com

Wendy Cheng Yan Yan (born Cheng Yan Yan; 28 April 1984), better known by her pseudonym Xiaxue, is a Singaporean blogger and online television personality who writes about her life, fashion and local issues in a provocative style. Her main blog, which attracts about 50,000 readers daily, has won prestigious blog awards and earned her sponsorship deals, as well as stints as a columnist and TV show host, but some of her posts have sparked national controversies.

== Personal life ==
Born in Singapore on 28 April 1984, Wendy Cheng studied at River Valley High School and graduated from Singapore Polytechnic with a diploma in mass media, then briefly worked as a project coordinator. Her father, an antique dealer, and her mother, a property agent, are divorced; she also has a younger brother. For a year, she maintained a paper diary, which her ex-boyfriend's new girlfriend threw away during a Chinese New Year spring cleaning. Wanting to air her thoughts in a space that nobody could throw away, she started blogging in April 2003. She underwent plastic surgery, sponsored by MediaCorp TV, to "correct her bulbous nose" in 2006.

In 2010, she married American engineer Mike Sayre, whom she met online and had dated for three years, and in March 2013, she gave birth to a boy named Dashiel.

In 2023, she announced that she and Mike Sayre had split up.

== Blogging ==
Wendy Cheng has several blogs, including her untitled main blog (usually known as xiaxue.blogspot.com), and several private blogs. Although she writes in the English language, she selected her pseudonym Xiaxue (下雪, pronounced something like sh'ya-shweh), which means "snowing" in Mandarin Chinese, because it "had that tinge of mysterious, beautiful girl thing about it". On her main blog, which attracts about 50,000 readers daily, she provides updates about her personal life, posts photographs, writes about topics such as fashion, discusses local issues such as "nasty taxi drivers", and posts paid advertorials. She often uses profanity in her posts and her success has been attributed to her provocative writing style. According to a survey she conducted, which attracted 6000 responses, her readers are mainly Singaporean, female, young adults interested in fashion and "looking for an alternative voice". Awards that her main blog has won include the 2004 and 2005 Wizbang Weblog Awards Best Asian Blog and the 2005 Bloggies Best Asian Weblog. In July 2005, a hacker defaced the blog, but she managed to restore its contents. Her main blog, the first from Singapore to enter the Technorati Global Top 100 Blogs List, was selected for the National Library Board archive in 2008.

== Other media ==
Due to the popularity of her main blog, Xiaxue has earned jobs in mainstream media, notably as a columnist for national newspapers TODAY and The New Paper, Maxim magazine and Snag magazine. In addition, she has served as an editor for blog aggregator Tomorrow.sg, a Star Blogger for the STOMP portal and a presenter at the 2005 Singapore Writer's Festival. She has struck sponsorship deals with many companies, including online eyewear store HoneyColor, childcare merchandise retailer Mothercare, T-shirt maker LocalBrand, hair salon Kimage and nail studio Voxy. In 2006, she and DJ Rosalyn Lee co-hosted Girls Out Loud, a reality TV series on MediaCorp Channel 5, where they engage in "outrageous antics and no-holds-barred banter". She has a fortnightly series, called Xiaxue's Guide to Life, on the web television channel clicknetwork.tv; its highest-rated episode had more than a million views. The Health Promotion Board selected her as an ambassador for their Get Fresh campaign to discourage women from smoking and help female smokers quit.

In 2024, Xiaxue announced a new podcast with fellow Singaporean celebrity JianHao Tan.

== Controversy ==
In October 2005, Xiaxue wrote an entry condemning a disabled man, who scolded a non-disabled man for using the toilet for the disabled, leading to an online backlash that prompted two sponsors to cancel their deals. Two months later, she suggested that foreign workers be banned from Orchard Road, as they were molesting Singaporean girls; many netizens condemned her posts as "racist rants" and signed an online petition to ban her from Orchard Road. She was accused of impersonating another blogger and abusing her position as a Tomorrow.sg editor to remove comments critical of her in January 2006. In July 2007, she made a post about the "seven most disgusting bloggers" in Singapore, sparking flame wars that were extensively covered by local media. In April 2008, she made a video about the iPhone, which she insists "was meant to be funny", but was dubbed "the worst iPhone review" by American technology writer Daniel Lyons and ridiculed on other technology websites, including Gizmodo. Xiaxue also has a heated rivalry with blogger Dawn Yang, who threatened to sue her for an allegedly defamatory post in June 2008.

In February 2020, Xiaxue was accused of “fatphobia” on social media after she called morbidly obese people “disgusting” and that they “don’t live past” the age of 40. Xiaxue claimed in an Instagram story that “they gorge themselves with 30 burgers a day and when they inevitably get a clogged artery or diabetes, taxpayers have to help foot their medical bills when their health conditions are entirely caused by their irresponsible behaviour”. Xiaxue's posts were deleted by Instagram after users reported her for harassment.

In July 2020, Xiaxue lost brand sponsorships following police reports over racist tweets, including tweets that were targeted at foreign workers, alleging “they molest people and fuck our maids and leer at girls and flood Little India” and the attempt to use the N-word in certain context. Beauty brand Fresh and Swedish timepiece company Daniel Wellington have publicly confirmed that they have ended their partnerships with Xiaxue following this incident. Reality and lifestyle channel Clicknetwork, with whom Xiaxue has worked with since 2011, dropped Xiaxue as a host.
