= Third Lee Kuan Yew Cabinet =

- 3rd Cabinet of Singapore

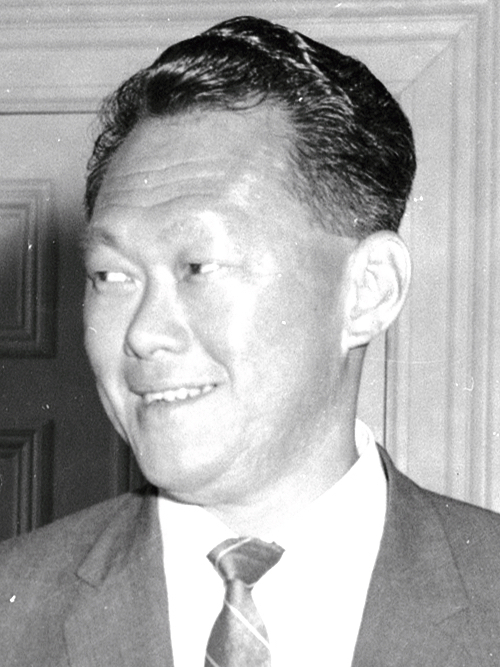
- Date formed: 16 April 1968
- Date dissolved: 15 September 1972

People and organisations
- Head of state: Yusof Ishak (until 23 November 1970); Yeoh Ghim Seng (acting: 23 November 1970 – 2 January 1971); Benjamin Sheares (from 2 January 1971)
- Head of government: Lee Kuan Yew
- Member party: People's Action Party
- Status in legislature: Supermajority

History
- Election: 1968
- Legislature term: 2nd Parliament of Singapore
- Predecessor: Second Lee Kuan Yew Cabinet
- Successor: Fourth Lee Kuan Yew Cabinet

The Third Lee Kuan Yew Cabinet was the third Cabinet of Singapore formed by Prime Minister Lee Kuan Yew in 1968, after the 1968 Singaporean general election. The cabinet lasted until 1972, with one shuffle in 1970.

== Cabinet ==
The Third Lee Kuan Yew Cabinet was composed of the following members.

Portfolio	Name	Term
Prime Minister	Lee Kuan Yew	5 June 1959 – 28 November 1990
Minister for Science and Technology	Toh Chin Chye	16 April 1968 – 1 June 1975
Minister for Finance	Goh Keng Swee	17 August 1967 – 10 August 1970
Minister for Finance	Hon Sui Sen	11 August 1970 – 14 October 1983
Minister for Foreign Affairs	S. Rajaratnam	12 August 1965 – 30 May 1980
Minister for Labour	S. Rajaratnam	16 April 1968 – 4 July 1971
Minister for Labour	Ong Pang Boon	5 July 1971 – 5 January 1981
Minister for Education	Ong Pang Boon	19 October 1963 – 10 August 1970
Minister for Education	Lim Kim San	11 August 1970 – 15 September 1972
Minister for Communications	Yong Nyuk Lin	16 April 1968 – 31 July 1975
Minister for Interior and Defence	Lim Kim San	17 August 1967 – 10 August 1970
Minister for Defence	Goh Keng Swee	11 August 1970 – 11 February 1979
Minister for Home Affairs	Ong Pang Boon	11 August 1970 – 5 September 1970
Minister for Home Affairs	Wong Lin Ken	6 September 1970 – 15 September 1972
Minister for Culture	Jek Yeun Thong	16 April 1968 – 25 September 1977
Minister for Social Affairs	Othman Wok	16 April 1968 – 30 June 1977
Minister for Law and National Development	E. W. Barker	9 August 1965 – 1 June 1975
Minister for Health	Chua Sian Chin	16 April 1968 – 1 June 1975

== List of office holders ==
The following is the list of office holders in the Third Lee Kuan Yew Cabinet. Cabinet members are listed in bold.

Prime Minister's Office
Office	Name	Term start	Term end
Prime Minister	**Lee Kuan Yew**	16 April 1968	15 September 1972
Minister of State for the Prime Minister's Office	Lee Khoon Choy	3 May 1968	15 September 1972
Minister of State for the Prime Minister's Office	Ya'acob Mohamed	3 May 1968	15 September 1972
Ministry of Communications
Office	Name	Term start	Term end
Minister for Communications	**Yong Nyuk Lin**	16 April 1968	15 September 1972
Parliamentary Secretary for Communications	Phua Bah Lee	3 May 1968	31 December 1971
Ministry of Culture
Office	Name	Term start	Term end
Minister for Culture	**Jek Yeun Thong**	16 April 1968	15 September 1972
Parliamentary Secretary for Culture	Fong Sip Chee	3 May 1968	31 December 1971
Parliamentary Secretary for Culture	Sha'ari Tadin	3 May 1968	15 September 1972
Ministry of Defence (from 11 August 1970)
Office	Name	Term start	Term end
Minister for Defence	**Goh Keng Swee**	11 August 1970	15 September 1972
Minister of State for Defence	Wee Toon Boon	11 August 1970	15 September 1972
Parliamentary Secretary for Defence	Phua Bah Lee	1 January 1972	15 September 1972
Ministry of Education
Office	Name	Term start	Term end
Minister for Education	**Ong Pang Boon**	16 April 1968	10 August 1970
Minister for Education	**Lim Kim San**	11 August 1970	15 September 1972
Minister of State for Education	Lee Chiaw Meng	11 August 1970	15 September 1972
Parliamentary Secretary for Education	Lee Chiaw Meng	3 May 1968	10 August 1970
Parliamentary Secretary for Education	Mohamad Ghazali Ismail	11 August 1970	31 May 1972
Parliamentary Secretary for Education	Sha'ari Tadin (Note: In an acting capacity.)	1 June 1972	15 September 1972
Ministry of Finance
Office	Name	Term start	Term end
Minister for Finance	**Goh Keng Swee**	16 April 1968	10 August 1970
Minister for Finance	**Hon Sui Sen**	11 August 1970	15 September 1972
Minister of State for Finance	Tang See Chim	11 August 1970	15 September 1972
Parliamentary Secretary for Finance	S. Ramaswamy	3 May 1968	2 May 1968
Parliamentary Secretary for Finance	Tang See Chim	3 May 1968	10 August 1970
Ministry of Foreign Affairs
Office	Name	Term start	Term end
Minister for Foreign Affairs	**S. Rajaratnam**	16 April 1968	15 September 1972
Minister of State for Foreign Affairs	Abdul Rahim Ishak	3 May 1968	15 September 1972
Parliamentary Secretary for Foreign Affairs	L. P. Rodrigo	1 August 1969	5 September 1970
Ministry of Health
Office	Name	Term start	Term end
Minister for Health	**Chua Sian Chin**	16 April 1968	15 September 1972
Parliamentary Secretary for Health	Chor Yeok Eng	3 May 1968	15 September 1972
Ministry of Home Affairs (from 11 August 1970)
Office	Name	Term start	Term end
Minister for Home Affairs	**Ong Pang Boon**	11 August 1970	5 September 1970
Minister for Home Affairs	**Wong Lin Ken**	6 September 1970	15 September 1972
Parliamentary Secretary for Home Affairs	L. P. Rodrigo	6 September 1970	15 September 1972
Ministry of Interior and Defence (until 10 August 1970)
Office	Name	Term start	Term end
Minister for Interior and Defence	**Lim Kim San**	16 April 1968	10 August 1970
Minister of State for Defence	Wee Toon Boon	3 May 1968	10 August 1970
Ministry of Labour
Office	Name	Term start	Term end
Minister for Labour	**S. Rajaratnam**	16 April 1968	4 July 1971
Minister for Labour	**Ong Pang Boon**	5 July 1971	15 September 1972
Minister of State for Labour	Sia Kah Hui	11 August 1970	15 September 1972
Parliamentary Secretary for Labour	Sia Kah Hui	3 May 1968	10 August 1970
Parliamentary Secretary for Labour	Fong Sip Chee	1 January 1972	15 September 1972
Ministry of Law and National Development
Office	Name	Term start	Term end
Minister for Law and National Development	**E. W. Barker**	16 April 1968	15 September 1972
Parliamentary Secretary for Law	S. Ramaswamy	3 May 1968	10 October 1970
Parliamentary Secretary for National Development	Ho Cheng Choon	3 May 1968	15 September 1972
Ministry of Social Affairs
Office	Name	Term start	Term end
Minister for Social Affairs	**Othman Wok**	16 April 1968	15 September 1972
Parliamentary Secretary for Social Affairs	Buang Omar Junid	3 May 1968	31 March 1970
Parliamentary Secretary for Social Affairs	Chan Chee Seng	3 May 1968	15 September 1972
