= Second Lee Kuan Yew Cabinet =

- 2nd Cabinet of Singapore

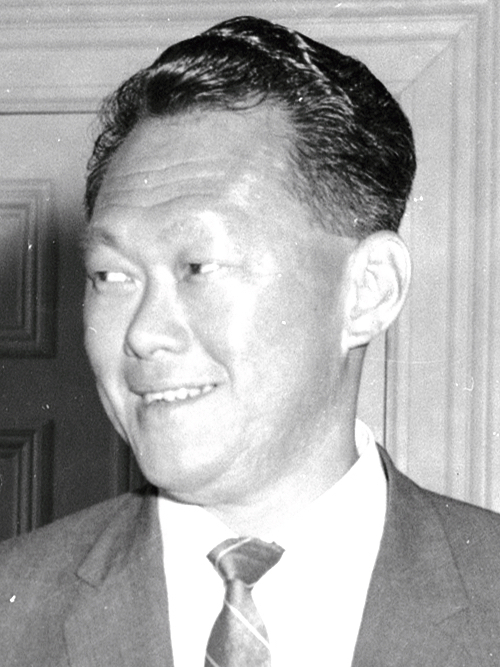
- Date formed: 19 October 1963
- Date dissolved: 15 April 1968

People and organisations
- Head of state: Yusof Ishak
- Head of government: Lee Kuan Yew
- Deputy head of government: Toh Chin Chye
- Member party: People's Action Party
- Status in legislature: Supermajority
- Opposition party: Barisan Sosialis; United People's Party (until 1965)
- Opposition leader: Lim Huan Boon (until 1965); Chia Thye Poh (1966)

History
- Election: 1963
- Legislature terms: 3rd Legislative Assembly; 1st Parliament
- Predecessor: First Lee Kuan Yew Cabinet
- Successor: Third Lee Kuan Yew Cabinet

The Second Lee Kuan Yew Cabinet was the Cabinet of Singapore from 19 October 1963 to 15 April 1968.

The cabinet was formed by Prime Minister Lee Kuan Yew after the People's Action Party won a supermajority of the seats in the Parliament of Singapore in the 1963 general election. It is the cabinet that governed Singapore when it was a state in Malaysia. It is also Singapore's first cabinet following its independence on 9 August 1965.

The cabinet was succeeded by the Third Lee Kuan Yew Cabinet.

== Cabinet ==
The Second Lee Kuan Yew Cabinet was composed of the following members.

=== October 1963 – August 1965 ===
Portfolio	Name	Term
Prime Minister	Lee Kuan Yew	5 June 1959 – 28 November 1990
Deputy Prime Minister	Toh Chin Chye	5 June 1959 – 15 April 1968
Minister for National Development	Lim Kim San	19 October 1963 – 8 August 1965
Minister for Finance	Goh Keng Swee	5 June 1959 – 8 August 1965
Minister for Home Affairs and Social Welfare	Othman Wok	19 October 1963 – 27 November 1963
Minister for Social Affairs	Othman Wok	28 November 1963 – 11 August 1965
Minister for Labour	Jek Yeun Thong	19 October 1963 – 15 April 1968
Minister for Health	Yong Nyuk Lin	19 October 1963 – 15 April 1968
Minister for Education	Ong Pang Boon	19 October 1963 – 10 August 1970
Minister for Culture	S. Rajaratnam	5 June 1959 – 8 August 1965
Minister for Law	E. W. Barker	1 November 1964 – 8 August 1965

=== August 1965 – April 1968 ===
Portfolio	Name	Term
Prime Minister	Lee Kuan Yew	5 June 1959 – 28 November 1990
Deputy Prime Minister	Toh Chin Chye	5 June 1959 – 15 April 1968
Minister for Defence and Security	Goh Keng Swee	9 August 1965 – 23 September 1965
Minister for Interior and Defence	Goh Keng Swee	24 September 1965 – 16 August 1967
Minister for Interior and Defence	Lim Kim San	17 August 1967 – 10 August 1970
Minister for Foreign Affairs and Culture	S. Rajaratnam	9 August 1965 – 11 August 1965
Minister for Foreign Affairs	S. Rajaratnam	12 August 1965 – 30 May 1980
Minister for Finance	Lim Kim San	9 August 1965 – 16 August 1967
Minister for Finance	Goh Keng Swee	17 August 1967 – 10 August 1970
Minister for Law and National Development	E. W. Barker	9 August 1965 – 1 June 1975
Minister for Social Affairs	Othman Wok	28 November 1963 – 11 August 1965
Minister for Culture and Social Affairs	Othman Wok	12 August 1965 – 15 April 1968
Minister for Labour	Jek Yeun Thong	19 October 1963 – 15 April 1968
Minister for Health	Yong Nyuk Lin	19 October 1963 – 15 April 1968
Minister for Education	Ong Pang Boon	19 October 1963 – 10 August 1970

== List of office holders ==
The following is the list of office holders in the Second Lee Kuan Yew Cabinet. Cabinet members are listed in bold.

Prime Minister's Office
Office	Name	Term start	Term end
Prime Minister	**Lee Kuan Yew**	19 October 1963	15 April 1968
Deputy Prime Minister	**Toh Chin Chye**	19 October 1963	15 April 1968
Minister of State for the Prime Minister's Office	Ya'acob Mohamed	18 September 1965	15 April 1968
Parliamentary Secretary to the Prime Minister	Ya'acob Mohamed	19 October 1963	17 September 1965
Parliamentary Secretary to the Deputy Prime Minister	Buang Omar Junid	19 October 1963	15 April 1968
Ministry of Culture (until 8 August 1965)
Office	Name	Term start	Term end
Minister for Culture	**S. Rajaratnam**	19 October 1963	8 August 1965
Parliamentary Secretary for Culture	Fong Sip Chee	19 October 1963	8 August 1965
Parliamentary Secretary for Culture	Lee Khoon Choy	12 July 1965	8 August 1965
Ministry of Defence and Security (9–23 September 1965) Ministry of Interior and Defence (from 24 September 1965)
Office	Name	Term start	Term end
Minister for Defence and Security	**Goh Keng Swee**	9 August 1965	23 September 1965
Minister for Interior and Defence	**Goh Keng Swee**	24 September 1965	16 August 1967
Minister for Interior and Defence	**Lim Kim San**	17 August 1967	15 April 1968
Minister of State for Defence	Wee Toon Boon	18 September 1965	15 April 1968
Ministry of Education
Office	Name	Term start	Term end
Minister for Education	**Ong Pang Boon**	19 October 1963	15 April 1968
Minister of State for Education	Abdul Rahim Ishak	18 September 1965	15 April 1968
Parliamentary Secretary for Education	Abdul Rahim Ishak	19 October 1963	17 September 1965
Ministry of Finance
Office	Name	Term start	Term end
Minister for Finance	**Goh Keng Swee**	19 October 1963	8 August 1965
Minister for Finance	**Lim Kim San**	9 August 1965	16 August 1967
Minister for Finance	**Goh Keng Swee**	17 August 1967	15 April 1968
Parliamentary Secretary for Finance	S. Ramaswamy	1 March 1966	15 April 1968
Ministry of Foreign Affairs and Culture (9–11 August 1965) Ministry of Foreign Affairs (from 12 August 1965)
Office	Name	Term start	Term end
Minister for Foreign Affairs and Culture	**S. Rajaratnam**	9 August 1965	11 August 1965
Minister for Foreign Affairs	**S. Rajaratnam**	12 August 1965	15 April 1968
Parliamentary Secretary for Culture	Fong Sip Chee	9 August 1965	11 August 1965
Parliamentary Secretary for Culture	Lee Khoon Choy	9 August 1965	11 August 1965
Ministry of Health
Office	Name	Term start	Term end
Minister for Health	**Yong Nyuk Lin**	19 October 1963	15 April 1968
Parliamentary Secretary for Health	Sia Kah Hui	19 October 1963	31 January 1967
Parliamentary Secretary for Health	Chor Yeok Eng	2 November 1966	15 April 1968
Ministry of Home Affairs and Social Welfare (until 27 November 1963) Ministry of Social Affairs (28 November 1963 – 11 August 1965) Ministry of Culture and Social Affairs (from 12 August 1965)
Office	Name	Term start	Term end
Minister for Home Affairs and Social Welfare	**Othman Wok**	19 October 1963	27 November 1963
Minister for Social Affairs	**Othman Wok**	28 November 1963	11 August 1965
Minister for Culture and Social Affairs	**Othman Wok**	12 August 1965	15 April 1968
Minister of State for Culture	Lee Khoon Choy	18 September 1965	15 April 1968
Parliamentary Secretary for Home Affairs	Chan Chee Seng	19 October 1963	27 November 1963
Parliamentary Secretary for Social Affairs	Chan Chee Seng	28 November 1963	15 April 1968
Parliamentary Secretary for Culture	Fong Sip Chee	12 August 1965	15 April 1968
Parliamentary Secretary for Culture	Lee Khoon Choy	12 August 1965	17 September 1965
Ministry of Labour
Office	Name	Term start	Term end
Minister for Labour	**Jek Yeun Thong**	19 October 1963	15 April 1968
Parliamentary Secretary for Labour	Wee Toon Boon	19 October 1963	17 September 1965
Parliamentary Secretary for Labour	Sia Kah Hui	1 February 1967	15 April 1968
Ministry of Law (until 8 August 1965) Ministry of Law and National Development (from 9 August 1965)
Office	Name	Term start	Term end
Minister for Law	**E. W. Barker**	1 November 1964	8 August 1965
Minister for Law and National Development	**E. W. Barker**	9 August 1965	15 April 1968
Parliamentary Secretary for National Development	Ho Cheng Choon	9 August 1965	15 April 1968
Ministry of National Development (until 8 August 1965)
Office	Name	Term start	Term end
Minister for National Development	**Lim Kim San**	19 October 1963	8 August 1965
Parliamentary Secretary for National Development	Ho Cheng Choon	19 October 1963	8 August 1965
