= Sixth Lee Kuan Yew Cabinet =

Sixth Cabinet of Singapore

- 6th Cabinet of Singapore

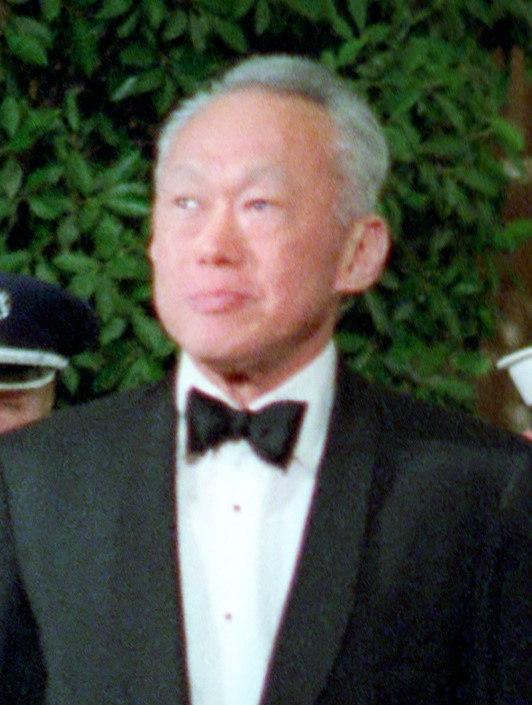
- Date formed: 6 January 1981
- Date dissolved: 1 January 1985

People and organisations
- Head of state: Benjamin Sheares (until 12 May 1981); Wee Chong Jin (acting: 12–14 May 1981); Yeoh Ghim Seng (acting:14 May – 23 October 1981); Devan Nair (from 23 October 1981)
- Head of government: Lee Kuan Yew
- Deputy head of government: Goh Keng Swee; S. Rajaratnam
- Member party: People's Action Party
- Status in legislature: Supermajority
- Opposition party: Workers' Party
- Opposition leader: J. B. Jeyaretnam

History
- Election: 1980
- Legislature term: 5th Parliament of Singapore
- Predecessor: Fifth Lee Kuan Yew Cabinet
- Successor: Seventh Lee Kuan Yew Cabinet

The Sixth Lee Kuan Yew Cabinet is the sixth Cabinet of Singapore. Formed by Prime Minister Lee Kuan Yew on 6 January 1981 following the 1980 general election, it governed Singapore until its dissolution on 1 January 1985.

== Cabinet ==
The Sixth Lee Kuan Yew Cabinet was composed of the following members.

Portfolio	Name	Term
Prime Minister	Lee Kuan Yew	5 June 1959 – 28 November 1990
First Deputy Prime Minister	Goh Keng Swee	1 June 1980 – 1 January 1985
Second Deputy Prime Minister (Foreign Affairs)	S. Rajaratnam	1 June 1980 – 1 January 1985
Minister for Finance	Hon Sui Sen	11 August 1970 – 14 October 1983
Minister for Finance	Tony Tan	24 October 1983 – 6 May 1985
Minister for the Environment	Ong Pang Boon	6 January 1981 – 1 January 1985
Minister for Law	E. W. Barker	2 June 1975 – 12 September 1988
Second Minister for Law	S. Jayakumar	1 June 1984 – 12 September 1988
Minister for Science and Technology	E. W. Barker	26 September 1977 – 1 April 1981
Minister for Home Affairs	Chua Sian Chin	1 November 1972 – 1 January 1985
Second Minister for Home Affairs	S. Jayakumar	1 June 1984 – 1 January 1985
Minister for Communications	Ong Teng Cheong	1 July 1978 – 8 May 1983
Minister for Communications	Ong Pang Boon	9 May 1983 – 6 September 1983
Minister for Communications	Yeo Ning Hong	7 September 1983 – 31 May 1984 (acting), 1 June 1984 – 1 January 1985
Minister for Labour	Ong Teng Cheong	6 January 1981 – 8 May 1983
Minister for Labour	E. W. Barker	9 May 1983 – 6 September 1983
Minister for Labour	S. Jayakumar	7 September 1983 – 31 May 1984 (acting), 1 June 1984 – 1 January 1985
Minister for Defence	Howe Yoon Chong	12 February 1979 – 31 May 1982
Minister for Defence	Goh Chok Tong	1 June 1982 – 30 June 1991
Second Minister for Defence	Goh Chok Tong	1 June 1981 – 31 May 1982
Second Minister for Defence	Yeo Ning Hong	1 June 1984 – 31 December 1986
Minister for National Development	Teh Cheang Wan	1 February 1979 – 14 December 1986
Minister for Trade and Industry	Goh Chok Tong	15 March 1979 – 31 May 1981
Minister for Trade and Industry	Tony Tan	1 June 1981 – 1 January 1985
Minister for Health	Goh Chok Tong	6 January 1981 – 31 May 1982
Minister for Health	Howe Yoon Chong	1 June 1982 – 1 January 1985
Second Minister for Health	Goh Chok Tong	1 June 1982 – 1 January 1985
Minister for Foreign Affairs	S. Dhanabalan	1 June 1980 – 12 September 1988
Minister for Culture	S. Dhanabalan	6 January 1981 – 1 January 1985
Minister for Education	Tony Tan	1 June 1980 – 31 May 1981
Minister for Education	Goh Keng Swee	1 June 1981 – 1 January 1985
Minister for Social Affairs	Ahmad Mattar	5 September 1977 – 31 May 1984 (acting), 1 June 1984 – 1 January 1985
Minister without portfolio	Lim Chee Onn	15 September 1980 – 1 August 1983
Minister without portfolio	Ong Teng Cheong	9 May 1983 – 1 January 1985

== List of office holders ==
The following is the list of office holders in the Sixth Lee Kuan Yew Cabinet. Cabinet members are listed in bold.

Prime Minister's Office
Office	Name	Term start	Term end
Prime Minister	**Lee Kuan Yew**	6 January 1981	1 January 1985
First Deputy Prime Minister	**Goh Keng Swee**	6 January 1981	1 January 1985
Second Deputy Prime Minister (Foreign Affairs)	**S. Rajaratnam**	6 January 1981	1 January 1985
Minister without portfolio	**Lim Chee Onn**	6 January 1981	1 August 1983
Minister without portfolio	**Ong Teng Cheong**	9 May 1983	1 January 1985
Senior Minister of State for the Prime Minister's Office	Lee Khoon Choy	6 January 1981	1 January 1985
Minister of State	Wan Soon Bee	7 September 1983	1 January 1985
Senior Parliamentary Secretary for the Prime Minister's Office	Ch'ng Jit Koon	2 January 1982	1 January 1985
Ministry of Communications
Office	Name	Term start	Term end
Minister for Communications	**Ong Teng Cheong**	6 January 1981	8 May 1983
Minister for Communications	**Ong Pang Boon**	9 May 1983	6 September 1983
Minister for Communications	**Yeo Ning Hong** (Note: In an acting capacity until 31 May 1984.)	7 September 1983	1 January 1985
Parliamentary Secretary for Communications	Sidek Saniff	6 January 1981	1 May 1981
Ministry of Culture
Office	Name	Term start	Term end
Minister for Culture	**S. Dhanabalan**	6 January 1981	1 January 1985
Senior Minister of State for Culture	Chai Chong Yii	16 January 1981	1 May 1981
Minister of State for Culture	Fong Sip Chee	2 May 1981	1 January 1985
Parliamentary Secretary for Culture	Sidek Saniff	6 January 1981	1 May 1981
Parliamentary Secretary for Culture	Wan Hussin Zoohri	21 September 1981	1 January 1985
Ministry of Defence
Office	Name	Term start	Term end
Minister for Defence	**Howe Yoon Chong**	6 January 1981	31 May 1982
Minister for Defence	**Goh Chok Tong**	1 June 1982	1 January 1985
Second Minister for Defence	**Goh Chok Tong**	1 June 1981	31 May 1982
Second Minister for Defence	**Yeo Ning Hong**	1 June 1984	1 January 1985
Minister of State for Defence	Bernard Chen	6 January 1981	1 May 1981
Minister of State for Defence	Yeo Ning Hong	1 April 1981	31 May 1984
Senior Parliamentary Secretary for Defence	Phua Bah Lee	6 January 1981	1 January 1985
Ministry of Education
Office	Name	Term start	Term end
Minister for Education	**Tony Tan**	6 January 1981	31 May 1981
Minister for Education	**Goh Keng Swee**	1 June 1981	1 January 1985
Minister of State for Education	Tay Eng Soon	1 April 1981	1 January 1985
Parliamentary Secretary for Education	Ow Chin Hock	16 January 1981	1 May 1981
Parliamentary Secretary for Education	Ho Kah Leong	2 May 1981	1 January 1985
Ministry of the Environment
Office	Name	Term start	Term end
Minister for the Environment	**Ong Pang Boon**	6 January 1981	1 January 1985
Senior Parliamentary Secretary for the Environment	Chor Yeok Eng	6 January 1981	31 December 1982
Parliamentary Secretary for the Environment	Teo Cheong Tee	3 May 1983	1 January 1985
Ministry of Finance
Office	Name	Term start	Term end
Minister for Finance	**Hon Sui Sen**	6 January 1981	14 October 1983
Minister for Finance	**Lee Kuan Yew**	15 October 1983	23 October 1983
Minister for Finance	**Tony Tan**	24 October 1983	1 January 1985
Minister of State for Finance	Lee Yock Suan	24 October 1983	1 January 1985
Ministry of Foreign Affairs
Office	Name	Term start	Term end
Minister for Foreign Affairs	**S. Dhanabalan**	6 January 1981	1 January 1985
Senior Minister of State for Foreign Affairs	Abdul Rahim Ishak	6 January 1981	1 January 1985
Ministry of Health
Office	Name	Term start	Term end
Minister for Health	**Goh Chok Tong**	6 January 1981	31 May 1982
Minister for Health	**Howe Yoon Chong**	1 June 1982	1 January 1985
Second Minister for Health	**Goh Chok Tong**	1 June 1982	1 January 1985
Parliamentary Secretary for Health	Wan Hussin Zoohri	21 September 1981	1 January 1985
Ministry of Home Affairs
Office	Name	Term start	Term end
Minister for Home Affairs	**Chua Sian Chin**	6 January 1981	1 January 1985
Second Minister for Home Affairs	**S. Jayakumar**	1 June 1984	1 January 1985
Minister of State for Home Affairs	S. Jayakumar	21 September 1981	31 May 1984
Senior Parliamentary Secretary for Home Affairs	Chin Harn Tong	1 May 1981	1 January 1985
Ministry of Labour
Office	Name	Term start	Term end
Minister for Labour	**Ong Teng Cheong**	6 January 1981	8 May 1983
Minister for Labour	**E. W. Barker**	9 May 1983	6 September 1983
Minister for Labour	**S. Jayakumar**	7 September 1983	1 January 1985
Minister of State for Labour	Sia Kah Hui	6 January 1981	1 May 1981
Minister of State for Labour	Wong Kwei Cheong	1 June 1981	6 September 1983
Senior Parliamentary Secretary for Labour	Fong Sip Chee	6 January 1981	1 May 1981
Parliamentary Secretary for Labour	Eugene Yap	1 June 1981	1 January 1985
Ministry of Law
Office	Name	Term start	Term end
Minister for Law	**E. W. Barker**	6 January 1981	1 January 1985
Second Minister for Law	**S. Jayakumar**	1 June 1984	1 January 1985
Minister of State for Law	S. Jayakumar	21 September 1981	31 May 1984
Ministry of National Development
Office	Name	Term start	Term end
Minister for National Development	**Teh Cheang Wan**	6 January 1981	1 January 1985
Minister of State for National Development	Lee Yock Suan	21 September 1981	23 October 1983
Senior Parliamentary Secretary for National Development	Lee Yiok Seng	1 May 1981	1 January 1985
Parliamentary Secretary for National Development	Lee Yiok Seng	6 January 1981	30 April 1981
Ministry of Science and Technology
Office	Name	Term start	Term end
Minister for Science and Technology	**E. W. Barker**	6 January 1981	31 March 1981
Ministry of Social Affairs
Office	Name	Term start	Term end
Minister for Social Affairs	**Ahmad Mattar**	6 January 1981	1 January 1985
Senior Parliamentary Secretary for Social Affairs	Chan Chee Seng	6 January 1981	1 May 1981
Parliamentary Secretary for Social Affairs	Sidek Saniff	2 May 1981	1 January 1985
Parliamentary Secretary for Social Affairs	Teo Cheong Tee	21 September 1981	1 January 1985
Ministry of Trade and Industry
Office	Name	Term start	Term end
Minister for Trade and Industry	**Goh Chok Tong**	15 March 1979	5 January 1981
Minister of State for Trade and Industry	Wong Kwei Cheong	7 September 1983	1 January 1985
Senior Parliamentary Secretary for Trade and Industry	Chan Chee Seng	1 June 1981	31 December 1983
Parliamentary Secretary for Trade and Industry	Sidek Saniff	2 May 1981	1 January 1985
