= Ministry of Home Affairs (Singapore) =

Government ministry of Singapore

Agency overview
- Formed: 5 June 1959; 67 years ago
- Preceding agency: Ministry of Interior and Defence
- Jurisdiction: Government of Singapore
- Headquarters: New Phoenix Park, 28 Irrawaddy Road, Singapore 329560
- Motto: Guardians of Singapore
- Employees: 31,107 (2024)
- Annual budget: ▲ S$8.27 billion (2024)
- Ministers responsible: K Shanmugam, Minister; Edwin Tong, Second Minister; Sim Ann, Second Minister; Goh Pei Ming, Senior Minister of State; Zhulkarnain Abdul Rahim, Minister of State
- Agency executives: Tan Chye Hee, Permanent Secretary (Home Affairs); Wong Kang Jet, 2nd Permanent Secretary; (Home Affairs): Ngiam Shih Chun, Deputy Secretary (Policy); Chan Tsan, Deputy Secretary (Development); Shie Yong Lee, Deputy Secretary (Corporate); Raja Kumar, Senior Advisor (International)
- Child agencies: Central Narcotics Bureau; Gambling Regulatory Authority; Home Team Academy; Home Team Science and Technology Agency; Immigration and Checkpoints Authority; Internal Security Department; Singapore Civil Defence Force; Singapore Police Force; Singapore Prison Service; Yellow Ribbon Singapore
- Website: www.mha.gov.sg
- Agency ID: T08GA0016D

The Ministry of Home Affairs (MHA), (Note: Malay: Kementerian Ehwal Dalam Negeri; Chinese: 内政部; Tamil: உள்துறை அமைச்சு) sometimes locally referred to as the Home Team, is a ministry of the Government of Singapore responsible for overseeing the national security, public security, civil defence, border control and immigration of Singapore.

== History ==
The Ministry of Home Affairs (MHA) was established in 5 June 1959, two days after when Singapore attained self-governance from the United Kingdom. It operated from the Empress Place Building until 16 September 1963, when Singapore merged with Malaysia and internal affairs briefly came under federal jurisdiction.

Following Singapore's independence from Malaysia on 9 August 1965, the ministry was re-established at the Empress Place Building under the purview of the newly formed Ministry of Interior and Defence (MID). After several months, MID relocated to the former Lower Barracks of the Police at Pearl's Hill.

On 11 August 1970, the Ministry of Interior and Defence was restructured into two separate entities: the Ministry of Home Affairs and the Ministry of Defence (MINDEF). MHA remained at Pearl's Hill until August 1977, when it relocated to Phoenix Park along Tanglin Road. MHA, alongside the Police Headquarters, subsequently moved to its current premises at New Phoenix Park on 18 August 2001.

== Organisational structure ==
Apart from Directorates in the ministry headquarters, the ministry is divided into 10 Home Team Departments, and is also responsible for four councils.

=== Home Team Departments ===
Department	Abbreviation	Date founded	Department head
Singapore Police Force	SPF	24 May 1820	How Kwang Hwee (Commissioner of Police)
Internal Security Department	ISD	1948	Classified (Director)
Singapore Civil Defence Force	SCDF	6 November 1982	Eric Yap Wee Teck (Commissioner)
Immigration and Checkpoints Authority	ICA	1 April 2003	Lian Ghim Hua (Commissioner)
Singapore Prison Service	SPS	1946	Shie Yong Lee (Commissioner of Prisons)
Central Narcotics Bureau	CNB	2 November 1971	Sebastian Tay (Director)
Home Team Academy	HTA	2 September 2006	Wilson Lim (Chief Executive)
Home Team Science and Technology Agency	HTX	1 December 2019	Tan Chye Hee (Chairman); Chan Tsan (Chief Executive)
Gambling Regulatory Authority	GRA	1 August 2022	Tan Tee How (Chairman); Teo Chun Ching (Chief Executive)
Yellow Ribbon Singapore	YRSG	1 May 2020	Phillip Tan (Chairman); Matthew Wee Yik Keong, (Chief Executive)

=== Committees/Councils ===
- Presidential Council for Religious Harmony
- National Crime Prevention Council
- National Council Against Drug Abuse
- National Fire and Civil Emergency Preparedness Council

== Ministers ==
The Ministry is headed by the Minister for Home Affairs, who is appointed as part of the Cabinet of Singapore. The incumbent Minister is K. Shanmugam, an MP for Nee Soon GRC from the governing People's Action Party.

=== Minister for Home Affairs (1959–1963) ===
Minister	Took office	Left office	Party	Cabinet
Ong Pang Boon; MP for Telok Ayer (born 1929)	3 June 1959	18 October 1963	PAP	Lee K. I
Othman Wok; MP for Pasir Panjang (1924–2017)	19 October 1963	27 November 1963	PAP	Lee K. II

=== Minister for the Interior and Defence (1965–1970) ===
Minister	Took office	Left office	Party	Cabinet
Goh Keng Swee; MP for Kreta Ayer (1918–2010)	9 August 1965	16 August 1967	PAP	Lee K. II
Lim Kim San; MP for Cairnhill (1916–2006)	17 August 1967	10 August 1970	PAP	Lee K. II
Lim Kim San; MP for Cairnhill (1916–2006)	17 August 1967	10 August 1970	PAP	Lee K. III

=== Minister for Home Affairs (1970–present) ===
Minister	Took office	Left office	Party	Cabinet
Ong Pang Boon; MP for Telok Ayer (born 1929)	11 August 1970	5 September 1970	PAP	Lee K. III
Wong Lin Ken; MP for Alexandra (1931–1983)	6 September 1970	15 September 1972	PAP	Lee K. III
E. W. Barker; MP for Tanglin (1920–2001)	16 September 1972	31 October 1972	PAP	Lee K. IV
Chua Sian Chin; MP for MacPherson (1933–2014)	1 November 1972	1 January 1985	PAP	Lee K. IV
Chua Sian Chin; MP for MacPherson (1933–2014)	1 November 1972	1 January 1985	PAP	Lee K. V
Chua Sian Chin; MP for MacPherson (1933–2014)	1 November 1972	1 January 1985	PAP	Lee K. VI
S. Jayakumar; MP for Bedok (until 1988) and Bedok GRC (from 1988) (born 1939)	2 January 1985	1 January 1994	PAP	Lee K. VII
S. Jayakumar; MP for Bedok (until 1988) and Bedok GRC (from 1988) (born 1939)	2 January 1985	1 January 1994	PAP	Lee K. VIII
S. Jayakumar; MP for Bedok (until 1988) and Bedok GRC (from 1988) (born 1939)	2 January 1985	1 January 1994	PAP	Goh I
S. Jayakumar; MP for Bedok (until 1988) and Bedok GRC (from 1988) (born 1939)	2 January 1985	1 January 1994	PAP	Goh II
Wong Kan Seng; MP for Bishan–Toa Payoh GRC (born 1946)	2 January 1994	31 October 2010	PAP	Goh II
Wong Kan Seng; MP for Bishan–Toa Payoh GRC (born 1946)	2 January 1994	31 October 2010	PAP	Goh III
Wong Kan Seng; MP for Bishan–Toa Payoh GRC (born 1946)	2 January 1994	31 October 2010	PAP	Goh IV
Wong Kan Seng; MP for Bishan–Toa Payoh GRC (born 1946)	2 January 1994	31 October 2010	PAP	Lee H. I
Wong Kan Seng; MP for Bishan–Toa Payoh GRC (born 1946)	2 January 1994	31 October 2010	PAP	Lee H. II
K. Shanmugam; MP for Sembawang GRC (born 1959)	1 November 2010	20 May 2011	PAP	Lee H. II
Teo Chee Hean; MP for Pasir Ris–Punggol GRC (born 1954)	21 May 2011	30 September 2015	PAP	Lee H. III
K. Shanmugam; MP for Nee Soon GRC (born 1959)	1 October 2015	Incumbent	PAP	Lee H. IV
K. Shanmugam; MP for Nee Soon GRC (born 1959)	1 October 2015	Incumbent	PAP	Lee H. V
K. Shanmugam; MP for Nee Soon GRC (born 1959)	1 October 2015	Incumbent	PAP	Wong I
K. Shanmugam; MP for Nee Soon GRC (born 1959)	1 October 2015	Incumbent	PAP	Wong II
