= Fong Sip Chee =

Singaporean former politician (1938–1992)

Fong Sip Chee PJG
- 邝摄治
- Fong in 1983

Minister of State for Culture
- In office 2 May 1981 – 1 January 1985
- Preceded by: Position established
- Succeeded by: Position abolished

Member of the Singapore Parliament for Stamford Constituency (Note: Formerly the Legislative Assembly from 1963 to 1965.)
- In office 22 October 1963 – 6 December 1976
- Preceded by: Fung Yin Ching (BS)
- Succeeded by: Constituency abolished

Member of the Singapore Parliament for Kampong Chai Chee Constituency
- In office 7 February 1977 – 17 August 1988
- Preceded by: Sha'ari Tadin
- Succeeded by: Constituency abolished

Personal details
- Born: Andrew Fong Sip Chee; 28 June 1938 Singapore, Straits Settlements
- Died: 5 December 1992 (aged 54) Singapore General Hospital, Outram, Singapore
- Resting place: All Saints Memorial Chapel
- Children: 2; including Arthur
- Awards: Pingat Jasa Gemilang, 1990

Andrew Fong Sip Chee (Note: Chinese: 邝摄治; Jyutping: Fong^{3} Sip^{3} Zi^{6}; pinyin: Kuàng Shèzhì) (28 June 1938 – 5 December 1992) was a Singaporean politician. A member of the People's Action Party, Fong served as the Minister of State for Culture from 1981 to 1985, the Member of Parliament representing Stamford Constituency from 1963 to 1976, and the MP representing Kampong Chai Chee Constituency from 1977 to 1988.

Fong also served as the Parliamentary Secretary to the Ministry of Culture and to the Ministry of Labour from 1963 to 1971 and 1972, respectively, and the Senior Parliamentary Secretary to the Ministry of Labour from 1972 to 1981.

== Early life ==
Fong was born on 28 June 1938 in the Straits Settlements and attended Beatty Secondary School. Before joining politics, Fong served as a housing expert.

== Career ==
He made his political debut at the 1963 general election, contesting for Member of Parliament (MP) representing Stamford Constituency against Teo Hock Guan of Barisan Sosialis, Lim Chung Min of United People's Party, and Lal Behari Singh of Singapore Alliance Party. He was elected with 53.27% of the vote.

In the 1968 general election, Fong contested for MP of Stamford Constituency again, being elected unopposed. He also headed a 21-member study mission to 4 other Asian countries, Thailand, Cambodia, Hong Kong, and Japan.

During the 1972 general election, he contested for MP of Stamford Constituency again, against Chiang Seok Keong of Workers' Party (WP), where he won with 71.77% of the vote. He was also appointed Parliamentary Secretary to the Ministry of Labour and Senior Parliamentary Secretary to the Ministry of Labour.

In the 1976 general election, after the dissolution of Stamford Constituency, Fong contested for MP of Kampong Chai Chee Constituency against J. B. Jeyaretnam from WP. He won with 59.92% of the vote. In the next general election, he contested for MP of Kampong Chai Chee Constituency again, against Leong Yew Thong of United Front, where he was elected with 81.22% of the vote. In 1980, he wrote a book titled The PAP Story – the Pioneering Years, about the history of the PAP.

At the 1984 general election, Fong contested for MP of Kampong Chai Chee Constituency again, against Seow Khee Leng of Singapore United Front. He was elected with 57.16% of the vote. He retired from politics in 1988.

== Personal life ==
In 1990, Fong was awarded the Pingat Jasa Gemilang. His son, Arthur Fong, went on to be a banker and politician.

=== Death ===
On 5 December 1992, Fong died of lung cancer at the Singapore General Hospital. He was survived by his wife, two sons, two daughters-in-law, and a granddaughter. He had been admitted to the hospital on 12 October, having stayed there till his death.
