= Home Team Science and Technology Agency =

Statutory board in Singapore

HTX (Home Team Science and Technology Agency)

Agency overview
- Formed: 1 December 2019; 6 years ago
- Jurisdiction: Government of Singapore
- Headquarters: 1 Stars Avenue; Singapore 138507
- Agency executives: Wong Kang Jet, Chairman; Chan Tsan, Chief Executive; Ng Yeow Boon, Deputy Chief Executive (Development); Chen Yeang Tat, Deputy Chief Executive (Operations); Colin Tan, Assistant Chief Executive (Programmes); Lim Kia Yong, Assistant Chief Executive (Operational ICT); Ang Chee Wee, Assistant Chief Executive (Digital & Enterprise)
- Parent agency: Ministry of Home Affairs
- Website: https://www.htx.gov.sg/
- Agency ID: T19GB0001D

Home Team Science and Technology Agency, also known as HTX, is a statutory board under the Ministry of Home Affairs (MHA) of Singapore that was established to develop science and technology capabilities for Home Team operations.

It focuses on areas such as surveillance, forensics, chemicals, biological, radiological, nuclear, and explosives threats, as well as robotics and unmanned systems.

== History ==
Home Team Science and Technology Agency was first announced on 19 February 2019 during the Budget. It was to be set up by the end of 2019 to allow the Ministry of Home Affairs to better secure Singapore with its science and technology capabilities. The initials of the agency are known as HTX; with "X" representing its role as a "force multiplier".

HTX was formed on 1 December 2019 and launched the following day by Prime Minister Lee Hsien Loong.

In June 2024, Chief Executive Chan Tsan announced that HTX would become an 'AI first' organisation and that all officers in the agency were being asked to "think AI first". He stated that a SGD 400 million budget would be allocated to HTX's projects in the forthcoming 3 years and a significant proportion of that would be used for AI research and development.

As of June 2024, the agency had about 2,000 employees. Chan explained that the agency intended to hire and train an additional 500 persons, all of whom would be focused on AI work, in the next three to five years.

== Products ==
Rover-X, a quadruped robot developed by HTX, Ghost Robotics, Klass Engineering and Solutions, and the Agency for Science, Technology and Research, was announced during HTX's 2019 launch. Originally developed for search-and-rescue missions, its capabilities have since been expanded to include patrolling, investigation of hazardous materials incidents, and other front-line work for the Home Team departments such as the Singapore Civil Defence Force (SCDF) and Singapore Police Force (SPF).

In July 2021, Singapore's Health Sciences Authority trialled an e-commerce surveillance tool developed by HTX to identify contraband items offered for sale on local e-commerce platforms. The contraband items included illegal drugs, health products, cosmetics, and unauthorised Covid-19 test kits and vaccines.

In September, HTX and the Singapore Prison Service started a live trial at Selarang Park Community Supervision Centre to conduct drug screening tests for ex-offenders using the Prison Automated Screening System, an automated contactless urine testing system which uses robotics, sensors, and deep learning technology.

A team from Nanyang Technological University, HTX, and Klass Engineering and Solutions announced in December that they were developing cyborg cockroaches for search-and-rescue operations at disaster sites.

HTX and the Immigration and Checkpoints Authority launched a trial at Changi Airfreight Centre of an artificial intelligence system which can assist with X-ray parcel screening for contraband items like knives or guns. The system, known as eXaminer, can be extended to baggage screening at airports, ferry terminals and land checkpoints.

HTX also developed the Online Cybersquat Hunter (OCH) for MHA to identify and take down scam websites used for phishing. In a trial in early 2022, OCH detected fake news websites set up by scammers for phishing.

In March 2022, SPF, Government Technology Agency, and HTX launched the digital driving licence which functions as an alternative and more convenient official identification document for drivers in Singapore.

On 10 June 2022, the Emergency Responders’ Fitness Conditioning and Enhancement Lab (EXCEL), a joint development by HTX and SCDF, was launched. EXCEL is an integrated research and development and training facility to improve physical and mental performance of emergency responders.

The 3rd Generation HazMat Control Vehicle was developed by SCDF, HTX, the Defence Science and Technology Agency (DSTA) and DSO National Laboratories to improve emergency response to HazMat incidents. Announced in March 2023, the vehicle's analytical equipment can help emergency responders identify hazardous substances, assess the extent of contamination, and determine the mitigation approach.

In February 2023, HTX started trials of the Bioaerosol Threats Detector (BioXcap) at one of Singapore's border checkpoints to provide early warning of the presence of biological threats in the air within 30 minutes. BioXcap is capable of identifying up to 10 different types of biological agents, including anthrax, plague, and ricin.

In November 2023, HTX announced that they were developing a barrier-free gantry and self-enrolment biometrics kiosk (collectively known as the 'Next-Generation Clearance Concept') for immigration clearance at Singapore's borders. The agency estimated that the new system would reduce the immigration clearance time from about two minutes to ten seconds per passenger.

== See also ==
- Home Team Academy
