= S. Jayakumar (Singaporean politician) =

Singaporean politician

S. Jayakumar BBM DUT
- எஸ். செயக்குமார்
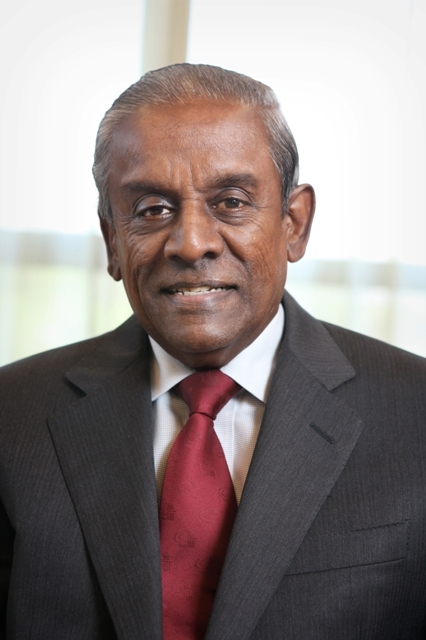
- Jayakumar in 2009

4th Senior Minister of Singapore
- In office 1 April 2009 – 20 May 2011 Serving with Goh Chok Tong (2004–2011)
- Prime Minister: Lee Hsien Loong
- Preceded by: Lee Kuan Yew
- Succeeded by: Teo Chee Hean; Tharman Shanmugaratnam

Coordinating Minister for National Security
- In office 1 September 2005 – 31 October 2010
- Prime Minister: Lee Hsien Loong
- Preceded by: Tony Tan
- Succeeded by: Wong Kan Seng

5th Deputy Prime Minister of Singapore
- In office 12 August 2004 – 1 April 2009 Serving with Tony Tan (1995–2005); Wong Kan Seng (2005–2011)
- Prime Minister: Lee Hsien Loong
- Preceded by: Lee Hsien Loong
- Succeeded by: Teo Chee Hean; Tharman Shanmugaratnam

Minister for Foreign Affairs
- In office 3 January 1994 – 11 August 2004
- Prime Minister: Goh Chok Tong
- Preceded by: Wong Kan Seng
- Succeeded by: George Yeo

Minister for Law
- In office 12 September 1988 – 30 April 2008
- Prime Minister: Lee Kuan Yew; Goh Chok Tong; Lee Hsien Loong
- Preceded by: E. W. Barker
- Succeeded by: K. Shanmugam

Minister for Home Affairs
- In office 3 January 1985 – 31 December 1993
- Prime Minister: Lee Kuan Yew; Goh Chok Tong
- Preceded by: Chua Sian Chin
- Succeeded by: Wong Kan Seng

Minister for Labour
- In office 1 June 1984 – 1 January 1985; Acting: 7 September 1983 – 31 May 1984
- Prime Minister: Lee Kuan Yew
- Preceded by: E. W. Barker
- Succeeded by: Lee Yock Suan

Member of the Singapore Parliament for Bedok
- In office 23 December 1980 – 19 April 2011
- Preceded by: Sha'ari Tadin (PAP)
- Succeeded by: Lim Swee Say (PAP)
- Constituency: Bedok SMC (1980–1988); Bedok GRC (1988–1997); East Coast GRC (1997–2011)

Personal details
- Born: Shunmugam Jayakumar; 12 August 1939 (age 87) Singapore, Straits Settlements
- Party: People's Action Party
- Spouse: Lalitha Rajahram
- Children: 3
- Education: National University of Singapore (LLB); Yale University (LLM)
- Profession: Politician; diplomat; jurist; author

Shunmugam Jayakumar (Note: Tamil: சண்முகம் செயக்குமார், romanized: Caṇmukam Ceyakkumār) (born 12 August 1939) is a Singaporean former politician, diplomat, jurist and author who served as the 5th Deputy Prime Minister of Singapore between 2004 and 2009. A member of the governing People's Action Party (PAP), he was the Member of Parliament (MP) for Bedok Constituency between 1980 and 1988, the Bedok division of Bedok Group Representation Constituency (GRC) between 1988 and 1997, and the Bedok division of East Coast GRC between 1997 and 2011.

Jayakumar served as Minister for Foreign Affairs between 1994 and 2004, Minister for Home Affairs between 1988 and 1994, Minister for Law between 1988 and 2008, Minister for Labour in 1984 and 1985, Senior Minister and Coordinating Minister for National Security concurrently in 2009 and 2011. He became Deputy Prime Minister in 2004 after Lee Hsien Loong resigned to become Prime Minister. In June 2020, he was appointed Pro-Chancellor of the National University of Singapore (NUS).

== Early life and education ==
Born in Singapore during British colonial rule, Jayakumar was educated at Raffles Institution before graduating from the University of Singapore (now the National University of Singapore) with a Bachelor of Laws with honours degree and was called to the Bar in 1964.

He subsequently went on to complete a Master of Laws degree at Yale Law School in 1966.

== Career ==
=== Academic career ===
Upon his graduation from Yale Law School, Jayakumar took on a lecturing position at the National University of Singapore's Faculty of Law between 1964 and 1981, assuming the position of Dean in 1974, which he held until 1980.

=== Diplomatic career ===
While teaching at NUS Faculty of Law, Jayakumar concurrently served as Singapore's Permanent Representative to the United Nations and Singapore's High Commissioner to Canada between 1971 and 1974. He was also a member of Singapore's delegation to the United Nations Convention on the Law of the Sea between 1974 and 1979.

Jayakumar also authored three books and 32 articles on the topics of constitutional law, international law and legal education.

=== Political career ===
In 1980, Jayakumar was elected as the Member of Parliament (MP) representing the Bedok constituency. He remained as the MP for the Bedok constituency after the 1988 general election but this time under the newly created Bedok GRC.

During the 1991 general election, he remained as the MP for the Bedok constituency but this time under the newly created East Coast GRC. He retained his seat in 1997 general election and 2006 general election.

In 1981, Jayakumar was appointed as Minister of State for Home Affairs and Minister of State for Law. He first served in Prime Minister Lee Kuan Yew's Cabinet in 1984 as Minister for Labour, Second Minister for Home Affairs and Second Minister for Law.

Jayakumar was appointed Minister for Home Affairs and Second Minister for Law on 2 January 1985.

In 1988, Jayakumar was appointed Minister for Law and Minister for Home Affairs. He retained these portfolios under Prime Minister Goh Chok Tong.

In January 1994, Jayakumar was appointed Minister for Foreign Affairs and Minister for Law.

On 12 August 2004, Jayakumar was appointed Deputy Prime Minister and Minister for Law under Prime Minister Lee Hsien Loong's Cabinet. On 1 September 2005, Jayakumar took over the role as Coordinating Minister for National Security from Tony Tan to oversee counter-terrorism policies in Singapore.

Jayakumar stepped down as Minister for Law on 30 April 2008, and as Deputy Prime Minister on 1 April 2009.

Jayakumar was appointed a Senior Minister on 1 April 2009 before retiring from politics on 21 May 2011. He decided not to contest in the 2011 general election citing health reasons. He also resigned as a permanent member of the Presidential Council for Minority Rights which he was appointed to the position on 1 July 1998.

== Career after politics ==
After his retirement from politics, Jayakumar served as Chair of the National University of Singapore Faculty of Law's Advisory Council and Patron of the NUS Centre for International Law. He became an emeritus professor at the NUS Faculty of Law, and a consultant at Drew & Napier, one of the Big Four law firms in Singapore. On 1 July 2020, he was appointed pro-chancellor of the National University of Singapore, where he served until 2023.

On 4 April 2021, during the National Day Awards, Jayakumar was conferred the Order of Temasek (With High Distinction), the nation's highest civilian honour, by President Halimah Yacob for his "wide-ranging, invaluable and unique contributions to the well-being and security of Singapore". In the investiture ceremony, he was praised for having "given his entire life to the service of Singapore" and the citation of his award said: "Uniquely among public servants, Prof Jayakumar brought an exceptionally keen legal mind to bear on a considerable range of issues, from national security and foreign policy to political and constitutional developments."

== Publications ==
Jayakumar has written and published several books related to his life and experiences in foreign affairs and diplomacy. In 2009, Jayakumar and Ambassador-at-Large Tommy Koh published the book titled Pedra Branca: The Road to the World Court, which covers the territorial dispute between Malaysia and Singapore over Pedra Branca, a small island of strategic value located near the entry point to the Straits of Malacca.

In 2011, Jayakumar published a book titled Diplomacy: A Singapore Experience. The book covers his reflections on many events and episodes during his many years in public service. It also shared behind-the-scenes political decision making that governed Singapore's responses during important post-independence events that formed the basis of Singapore's foreign policy principles.

In 2015, he published a memoir titled Be at the Table or Be on the Menu: A Singapore Memoir, which covers his early life and his career as a law academic and dean before he entered politics.

In 2019, Jayakumar, Ambassador-at-Large Tommy Koh and Deputy Attorney-General Lionel Lee launched the book titled "Pedra Branca: Story Of The Unheard Cases", which recounts how Singapore's team prepared in the dispute with Malaysia over the sovereignty of Pedra Branca and also serves as a continuation to Pedra Branca: The Road to the World Court.

In November 2020, Jayakumar introduced his book titled Governing: A Singapore Perspective, which covers his views and experiences of Singapore's governance, such as how he viewed the Lee family dispute over their 38 Oxley Road home, and Prime Minister Lee Hsien Loong's retirement plan if the COVID-19 crisis has not improved.

== Honours ==
- Singapore:
  - Public Service Star (1980)
  - Order of Temasek with High Distinction (2020)
- Japan:
  - Grand Cordon of the Order of the Rising Sun (2012)

== Bibliography ==
- Jayakumar, S. (2003), The water issue: statement by Singapore Foreign Minister Prof S Jayakumar in Parliament, 25 Jan 2003, Singapore: Ministry of Foreign Affairs

(Contains official documents, press statements and speeches, correspondence between ministers of Singapore and Malaysia and text of the water agreements)

- Jayakumar, S. (c. 1996), The Southeast Asian drama: evolution and future challenges : Georgetown University inaugural distinguished lecture on Southeast Asia, Washington DC, 22 April 1996, Singapore(?): Ministry of Foreign Affairs(?)
- Jayakumar, S.; chairman ..., eds. (1984). People's Action Party 1954–1984 : Petir 30th anniversary issue. Singapore: Central Executive Committee, People's Action Party.
- Jayakumar, S., ed. (1982), Our heritage and beyond : a collection of essays on Singapore, its past, present and future, Singapore: Singapore National Trades Union Congress
- Jayakumar, S.; Chin, Tet Yung (1981), Report on the development of the Faculty of Law, Singapore: National University of Singapore
- Jayakumar, S. (1976). Constitutional law cases from Malaysia and Singapore. Singapore: Malayan Law Journal.
- Jayakumar, S. (1976). Constitutional law, with documentary materials. Singapore: Malaya Law Review, Faculty of Law, University of Singapore.
- Jayakumar, S. (1974). Public international law cases from Malaysia and Singapore. Singapore: Singapore University Press.

Political offices
Preceded by E. W. Barker	Minister for Labour; 1983–1985 (Acting: 1983–1984)	Succeeded by Lee Yock Suan as Acting Minister for Labour
Preceded by Chua Sian Chin	Minister for Home Affairs; 1985–1993	Succeeded by Wong Kan Seng
Preceded by E. W. Barker	Minister for Law; 1988–2008	Succeeded by K. Shanmugam
Preceded by Wong Kan Seng	Minister for Foreign Affairs; 1994–2004	Succeeded by George Yeo
Preceded by Lee Hsien Loong	Deputy Prime Minister of Singapore; 2004–2009	Succeeded by Teo Chee Hean
Preceded by Tony Tan	Co-ordinating Minister for National Security; 2005–2010	Succeeded by Wong Kan Seng
Preceded by Lee Kuan Yew	Senior Minister of Singapore; 2009–2011; Served alongside: Goh Chok Tong	Vacant Title next held by Teo Chee Hean; Tharman Shanmugaratnam; 2019
