= Lee Chiaw Meng =

Singaporean politician

- 李昭铭
- Lee in 1973

Minister for Science and Technology
- In office 2 June 1975 – 31 December 1976
- Prime Minister: Lee Kuan Yew
- Preceded by: Toh Chin Chye
- Succeeded by: Jek Yeun Thong

Minister for Education
- In office 16 September 1972 – 1 June 1975
- Prime Minister: Lee Kuan Yew
- Preceded by: Lim Kim San
- Succeeded by: Toh Chin Chye

Minister of State for Education
- In office 1970–1972
- Minister: Lim Kim San

Parliamentary Secretary for Education
- In office 3 May 1968 – 10 August 1970
- Minister: Ong Pang Boon; Lim Kim San

Member of the Singapore Parliament for Tanah Merah SMC
- In office 13 December 1980 – 4 December 1984
- Succeeded by: Ibrahim Othman (PAP)

Member of the Singapore Parliament for Farrer Park SMC
- In office 13 April 1968 – 6 December 1976
- Preceded by: Constituency established
- Succeeded by: Constituency abolished

Personal details
- Born: Lee Chiaw Meng; 28 February 1937 Singapore, Straits Settlements
- Died: 23 May 2001 (aged 64) Singapore
- Cause of death: Duodenum cancer
- Party: People's Action Party
- Spouse: Lynn Lee
- Children: 5
- Education: University of Malaya (BEng); University of London (PhD)

Lee Chiaw Meng (Note: Chinese: 李昭铭; Pe̍h-ūe-jī: Lí Chiau-mêng; pinyin: Lǐ Zhāomíng) (28 February 1937 – 23 May 2001) was a Singaporean politician who served as Minister of Education between 1972 and 1975, and Minister of Science and Technology in 1975 and 1976. A member of the governing People's Action Party (PAP), he was the Member of Parliament (MP) for Farrer Park SMC between 1968 and 1976, and Tanah Merah SMC between 1980 and 1984.

== Early life and education ==
Lee was educated at Catholic High School and Chung Cheng High School before graduating from the University of Malaya in 1960 with a Bachelor of Engineering degree.

After graduation, Lee worked in the Public Works Department as an engineer until 1961.

He subsequently went on complete a PhD in engineering at the University of London in 1965. Upon returning to Singapore, Lee joined Singapore Polytechnic as a lecturer in civil engineering.

== Political career ==
Lee made his political debut in the 1968 general election as a PAP candidate contesting in Farrer Park SMC and won 84.91% of the vote.

Lee contested in Farrer Park SMC again during the 1972 general election and won 73.8% of the vote. During the 1976 general election, Lee contested in Farrer Park SMC and won by an uncontested walkover. In the 1980 general election, when Farrer Park SMC was abolished, Lee contested Tanah Merah SMC and won by an uncontested walkover.

In 1972, Lee was appointed Minister of Education and was tasked to overhaul the school and university system. In 1975, in a bid to clear political and cultural obstacles, Prime Minister Lee Kuan Yew appointed Lee as Vice-Chancellor of Nanyang University, taking over from Hsueh Shou Sheng. Lee only served as Vice-Chancellor from March 1975 to August 1976 after failing to convert the Chinese-medium Nanyang University into an English-language university, as required by Lee. From 1975 to 1976, Lee briefly served as Minister for Science and Technology.

In 1984, Lee left politics and started his own engineering firm, Dr. Lee Chiaw Meng & Associates.

== Personal life ==
Lee was married to Lynn Lee and they had three sons and two daughters.

He was diagnosed with duodenum cancer in 1999 and died from it on 23 May 2001 at the age of 64.
