= Tanah Merah Constituency =

Former Singaporean constituency

Tanah Merah Constituency was a constituency in Singapore. It was created in 1980 by merging parts of Bedok and Changi constituencies. In 1988, it was abolished and merged into Bedok Group Representation Constituency (GRC).

== History ==
Prior to the 1988 general election, the constituency was merged alongside Bedok and Kampong Chai Chee Constituencies into Bedok GRC.

== Member of Parliament ==
Year	Member	Party
Formation
1980	Ibrahim Othman	PAP
1984	Ibrahim Othman	PAP
Constituency abolished (1984)

== Electoral results ==
Note: The Elections Department does not include rejected votes when calculating the vote shares of candidates. Hence, all candidates' vote shares will total to 100% at any given election (may not appear so in multi-way contests due to rounding).
