= Kampong Chai Chee Constituency =

Former Singaporean constituency

Kampong Chai Chee Constituency was a constituency in Bedok, Singapore. It was carved from Tampines and Siglap divisions in prior to 1968 general election as the population in Bedok grows. In 1988, the constituency was merged into Bedok Group Representation Constituency.

== Member of Parliament ==
Year	Member of Parliament	Party
1968	Sha'ari Tadin	PAP
1972	Sha'ari Tadin	PAP
1976	Fong Sip Chee	PAP
1980	Fong Sip Chee	PAP
1984	Fong Sip Chee	PAP

== Electoral results ==
Note: The Elections Department does not include rejected votes when calculating the vote shares of candidates. Hence, all candidates' vote shares will total to 100% at any given election (may not appear so in multi-way contests due to rounding).

=== Elections in 1960s ===
General Election 1968: Kampong Chai Chee
Party	Candidate	Votes	%	±%
PAP	Sha'ari Tadin	Walkover		
PAP win (new seat)				

=== Elections in 1970s ===
General Election 1972: Kampong Chai Chee
Party	Candidate	Votes	%	±%
PAP	Sha'ari Tadin	7,458	52.39	
BS	Ng Yang Choo	4,188	29.42	
WP	Hashim Bin Yadi	2,590	18.19	
PAP hold		Swing		

General Election 1976: Kampong Chai Chee
Party	Candidate	Votes	%	±%
PAP	Fong Sip Chee	10,729	59.92	+7.53
WP	J. B. Jeyaretnam	7,177	40.08	+21.89
PAP hold		Swing	+7.53	

=== Elections in 1980s ===
General Election 1980: Kampong Chai Chee
Party	Candidate	Votes	%	±%
PAP	Fong Sip Chee	15,421	81.22	+21.30
UF	Leong Yew Thong	3,565	18.78	+18.78
PAP hold		Swing	+21.30	

General Election 1984: Kampong Chai Chee
Party	Candidate	Votes	%	±%
PAP	Fong Sip Chee	12,125	57.16	−24.06
SUF	Seow Khee Leng	9,087	42.84	+24.06
PAP hold		Swing	-24.06	

- Notes: United Front was subsequently renamed into Singapore United Front.

== See also ==
- Bedok SMC
- Bedok GRC
- East Coast GRC
