= Bedok Constituency =

Former electoral division in Singapore

Bedok
- Former Single Member constituency for the Parliament of Singapore
- Region: Singapore

Former constituency
- Created: 1976
- Abolished: 1988
- Seats: 1
- Member: Constituency Abolished
- Replaced by: Bedok GRC

Bedok Constituency was a single member constituency in Bedok South, Singapore. It was formed in the 1976 general elections by carving a portion from Siglap constituency and continued throughout the period prior to 1988 general elections where the constituency, along with neighbouring constituencies namely: Kampong Chai Chee and Tanah Merah were merged to form the Bedok Group Representation Constituency.

== Member of Parliament ==
Year	Member	Party
Formation
1976	Sha'ari bin Tadin	PAP
1980	S Jayakumar	PAP
1984	S Jayakumar	PAP
Constituency abolished (1988)

== Electoral results ==
Note: The Elections Department does not include rejected votes when calculating the vote shares of candidates. Hence, all candidates' vote shares will total to 100% at any given election (may not appear so in multi-way contests due to rounding).

=== Elections in 1970s ===
General Election 1976
Party	Candidate	Votes	%
PAP	Sha'ari bin Tadin	7,928	73.78
UF	Sim Peng Kim	2,818	26.22
Majority		5,110	47.56
Total valid votes		10,746	97.79
Rejected ballots		243	2.21
Turnout		10,989	97.16
Registered electors		11,310	
PAP win (new seat)			

=== Elections in 1980s ===
General Election 1980
Party	Candidate	Votes	%	±%
PAP	S Jayakumar	14,691	75.03	▲1.25
PKMS	Abdul Rahman Bin Mohamed Zin	3,527	18.01	N/A
UPF	Thomas Anthony Tay	1,362	6.96	N/A
Majority		11,164	57.02	▲9.46
Total valid votes		19,580	97.57	▼0.22
Rejected ballots		487	2.43	▲0.22
Turnout		20,067	96.23	▼1.0
Registered electors		20,852		▲84.37
PAP hold		Swing	▲1.25	

General Election 1984
Party	Candidate	Votes	%	±%
PAP	S Jayakumar	10,972	68.95	▼6.08
SUF	Lee Chin Teck	4,941	31.05	N/A
Majority		6,031	37.90	▼19.12
Total valid votes		15,913	96.62	▼0.95
Rejected ballots		556	3.38	▲0.95
Turnout		16,469	96.46	▲0.23
Registered electors		17,074		▼18.12
PAP hold		Swing	▼6.08	
