= Bedok Group Representation Constituency =

Former electoral division in Singapore

Bedok
- Former group representation constituency for the Parliament of Singapore

Former constituency
- Created: 1988; 37 years ago
- Abolished: 1997; 28 years ago
- Seats: 4
- Party: People's Action Party
- Created from: Bedok Constituency; Kampong Chai Chee Constituency; Tanah Merah Constituency
- Replaced by: East Coast GRC

The Bedok Group Representation Constituency was a group representation constituency (GRC) in eastern Singapore.

== History ==
Bedok GRC was established prior to the 1988 general election, comprising the three former constituencies of Bedok, Kampong Chai Chee, and Tanah Merah. Constituencies with a single Member of Parliament (MP) were renamed single-member constituencies (SMCs). The governing People's Action Party (PAP) defeated the Workers' Party (WP) with 54.92% of the vote.

During the 1991 general election, Bedok GRC was expanded to have four seats, as with all other GRCs at the election; it also absorbed the defunct SMCs of Fengshan and Siglap. The PAP defeated the WP with an improved 61.98% of the vote.

In the 1997 general election, Bedok GRC was one of two GRCs (the other being Eunos) merged into the newly created six-seat East Coast GRC.

== Members of Parliament ==
Year	Division	Members of Parliament	Party
Formation
1988	Bedok; Kampong Chai Chee; Tanah Merah	S. Jayakumar; Hong Hai; Ibrahim Othman	PAP
1991	Bedok; Fengshan; Tanah Merah; Siglap	S. Jayakumar; Tan Soo Khoon; Arthur Beng; Abdullah Tarmugi	PAP
Constituency abolished (1997)

== Electoral results ==
Note: The Elections Department does not include rejected votes when calculating the vote shares of candidates. Hence, all candidates' vote shares will total to 100% at any given election (may not appear so in multi-way contests due to rounding).

=== Elections in 1980s ===
General Election 1988
Party	Candidate	Votes	%
PAP	S. Jayakumar Hong Hai Ibrahim Othman	28,266	54.92
WP	Gertrude De Gracias Sarawathy Murugason Seow Khee Leng	23,203	45.08
Majority		5,063	9.84
Total valid votes		51,469	98.05
Rejected ballots		1,024	1.95
Turnout		52,493	95.50
Registered electors		54,969	
PAP win (new seat)			

=== Elections in 1990s ===
General Election 1991
Party	Candidate	Votes	%	±%
PAP	S. Jayakumar Abdullah Tarmugi Tan Soo Khoon Arthur Beng Kian Lam	49,109	61.98	▲7.06
WP	Balakrishnan Ananthan Sim Say Chuan Lim Chiu Liang Tan Soo Phuan	30,121	38.02	▼7.06
Majority		18,988	23.96	▲14.12
Total valid votes		79,230	97.20	▼0.85
Rejected ballots		2,276	2.80	▲0.85
Turnout		81,506	94.51	▼0.99
Registered electors		86,246		56.90
PAP hold		Swing	▲7.06	

== See also ==
- Bedok SMC
- Ulu Bedok SMC
