= Chan Chee Seng =

Singaporean former politician (1932–2022)

- 陈志成
- Chan in 2015

Member of the Singapore Parliament for Jalan Besar Constituency (Note: Formerly the Legislative Assembly from 1959 to 1965.)
- In office 30 May 1959 – 4 December 1984
- Preceded by: Constituency established
- Succeeded by: Lee Boon Yang

Party Whip of the People's Action Party
- In office 17 October 1963 – 15 April 1968
- Preceded by: Lee Khoon Choy
- Succeeded by: Sia Kah Hui

Personal details
- Born: Chan Chee Seng; 15 November 1932 Singapore, Straits Settlements
- Died: 17 December 2022 (aged 90) Tan Tock Seng Hospital, Novena, Singapore

Chan Chee Seng (Note: Chinese: 陈志成; Jyutping: Can^{4} Zi^{3} Sing^{4}; pinyin: Chén Zhìchéng) (15 November 1932 – 17 December 2022) was a Singaporean former politician. A former member of the People's Action Party (PAP), he served as the Member of Parliament (MP) representing Jalan Besar Constituency from 1959 to 1984 and the Party Whip of the People's Action Party from 1963 to 1968.

He also served as the Parliamentary Secretary for Social Affairs from 1963 to 1972, the Senior Parliamentary Secretary for Social Affairs from 1972 to 1981, and the Senior Parliamentary Secretary for Trade and Industry from 1981 to 1982.

== Early life and education ==
Chan was born on 15 November 1932 in the Straits Settlements (present-day Singapore) and attended Catholic High School and Saint Andrew's School. He worked as a bank clerk before resigning after he was elected City Councillor of Jalan Besar in 1957 to work at the Council full time. He also served as the secretary of City Division of the PAP and the general secretary of the Singapore Telephone Board Employees' Union.

== Political career ==
Chan left the Council in April 1959 and made his political debut in the 1959 general election, being asked to contest by S. Rajaratnam. He contested for Member of Parliament (MP) of Jalan Besar Constituency against Wong Yew Hon of Singapore People's Alliance, Lo Ka Fat of Liberal Socialist Party, and See Eng Kiat of Labour Front. Chan was elected with 62.48% of the vote. In October 1959, Chan and Lim Boon Teck held talks in Kallang Basin, assuring citizens of the safety of the Police Force against gangsters.

In 1961, then-Prime Minister Lee Kuan Yew held a vote of confidence which would have resulted in his resignation if he had failed to secure a majority. Following this, Chan went to fellow PAP member Sahorah Ahmat who was bedridden at the Singapore General Hospital and brought her to the Legislative Assembly in an ambulance and carried her in a stretcher. Her vote helped Lee to secure a majority.

In the 1963 general election, he contested for MP of Jalan Besar Constituency again against Ng Ngeong Yew of Barisan Sosialis and Yong Wan Kit of United People's Party. Chan was elected with 51.87% of the vote. He was also appointed as Party Whip of the People's Action Party and Parliamentary Secretary for Social Affairs. In the 1968 general election, Chan contested for MP of Jalan Besar Constituency again, being elected unopposed.

In the 1972 general election, Chan contested for MP of Jalan Besar Constituency again against Johnnie Ng Kong Wah of United National Front. Chan was elected with 83.86% of the vote. He was also appointed Senior Parliamentary Secretary for Social Affairs. At the 1976 general election, he contested for MP of Jalan Besar Constituency again, being elected unopposed. In February 1976, he left the Singapore Taxi Driver's Association stating that he was busy and "not able to look after the association's interest."

At the 1980 general election, Chan contested for MP of Jalan Besar Constituency again, being elected unopposed. In 1981, he was appointed Senior Parliamentary Secretary for Trade and Industry. He retired from politics in 1984, after having served as MP for Jalan Besar Constituency for 25 years.

=== Post-political career ===
Chan served as the secretary general of the Telephone Board Employees Union and the president of the Singapore Jogging Association. In 1981, he and three others founded ISS International School and, in 1993, was joined by his wife, Chan Ching Oi. In 1994, Chan announced plans for ISS to branch out internationally to Tianjin, Chaoyang, and Guangzhou. Costing about S$4 million, he partnered with the Education Board of Chaoyang to build the branch at Chaoyang.

He also served as vice-president of the Singapore National Olympic Council and president of the Singapore Amateur Swimming Association. At the 1977 SEA Games, Chan served as the Chef de Mission.

== Death ==
On 17 December 2022, Chan died of pneumonia at Tan Tock Seng Hospital. He was survived by his wife, two daughters, and three grandchildren.
