= Chua Sian Chin =

Singaporean politician

Chua Sian Chin DUNU
- 蔡善进
- Chua in the 1970s

Minister for Health
- In office 16 April 1968 – 1 June 1975
- Prime Minister: Lee Kuan Yew
- Preceded by: Yong Nyuk Lin
- Succeeded by: Toh Chin Chye

Minister for Home Affairs
- In office 31 October 1972 – 1 January 1985
- Prime Minister: Lee Kuan Yew
- Preceded by: E. W. Barker
- Succeeded by: S. Jayakumar

Minister for Education
- In office 20 October 1975 – 11 February 1979
- Prime Minister: Lee Kuan Yew
- Preceded by: Lee Chiaw Meng
- Succeeded by: Goh Keng Swee

Member of the Singapore Parliament for MacPherson
- In office 13 April 1968 – 14 August 1991
- Preceded by: Constituency established
- Succeeded by: Constituency abolished

Personal details
- Born: Chua Sian Chin; 26 November 1933 Malacca, Straits Settlements (now Malaysia)
- Died: 26 February 2014 (aged 80) Singapore
- Party: People's Action Party

Chua Sian Chin (Note: Chinese: 蔡善进; Pe̍h-ōe-jī: Chhòa Siān-chìn; pinyin: Cài Shànjìn) (26 November 1933 – 26 February 2014) was a Singaporean politician who held several ministerial portfolios of Health, Education and Home Affairs in the early era of Singapore. He was 34 years of age when appointed as Health Minister in 1968 which made him the youngest minister in Singapore.

== Early life and education ==
Chua was born in Malacca and attended the Malacca High School. After obtaining his bachelor’s degree from the University of Malaya in 1954, Chua travelled to England to study law at the University of London where he completed his law degree in 1958. He was then called to the bar by the Inner Temple in 1959. During his studies, Chua was active in student affairs. At the University of Malaya, he was a member of the University Socialist Club’s central working committee. He then served as secretary of the Malayan Forum and editor of the forum’s newsletter, Suara Merdeka, while studying in London.

== Legal career ==
After returning to Singapore in 1959, Chua joined the law firm of Lee and Lee where he became a partner in 1965. At the firm, Chua served as a legal adviser to numerous associations and trade unions such as the Singapore Hawkers’ Petty Traders Association, the Chinese Teachers’ Union, as well as the Chua and Ong clan associations. He also represented the Minister for Education Yong Nyuk Lin at the Commission of Inquiry on the Secondary Four Students’ Boycott in 1962.

Besides practising as an advocate and solicitor, Chua also served as a member in the Public Utilities Board, the permanent examination board of the Singapore Public Service Commission, the citizenship committee of inquiry and the governing board of the National Trades Union Congress (NTUC) Research Unit. He was also a referee of the Industrial Arbitration Court and served as chairman of the University of Singapore Council from 1967 to 1968.

== Political career ==
Chua entered politics when he was elected unopposed as a PAP MP for the MacPherson constituency in the 1968 general election. Earlier, he had contested unsuccessfully as a PAP candidate for the Bandar Malacca seat in the 1964 Malaysian general election. Following his successful entry into parliament, Chua was appointed as the minister for health in April 1968 at the age of 34, making him then the youngest cabinet minister in Singapore’s history

He was the Member of Parliament for MacPherson from 17 February 1968 to 14 August 1991. He retired from political service after 23 years in service. During his time as Member of Parliament, in 1975, Chua, then Minister for Home Affairs, proposed that the death penalty should be the mandatory sentence for drug trafficking of certain amounts to address the increasing rate of drug-related crimes, and these proposals were approved and passed in law.

== Personal life ==
Chua had two sons and one daughter. His eldest son was Chua Eng Leong, who served as a branch chairman for the Eunos division for the Workers' Party-held Aljunied GRC from 2012 to August 2024. He contested and lost the constituency twice in the 2015 and the 2020 general elections under the PAP ticket.

On 26 February 2014, he died at the age of 80 after suffering from heart failure.

== Reference list ==
Political offices
Preceded by E. W. Barker	Minister for Home Affairs; 31 October 1972-1 January 1985	Succeeded by S. Jayakumar
Preceded by Lee Chiaw Meng	Minister for Education; 20 October 1975-11 February 1979	Succeeded by Goh Keng Swee
Preceded by Yong Nyuk Lin	Minister for Health; 16 April 1968-1 June 1975	Succeeded by Toh Chin Chye
