= Yong Nyuk Lin =

Singaporean politician

Yong Nyuk Lin DUNU
- 杨玉麟
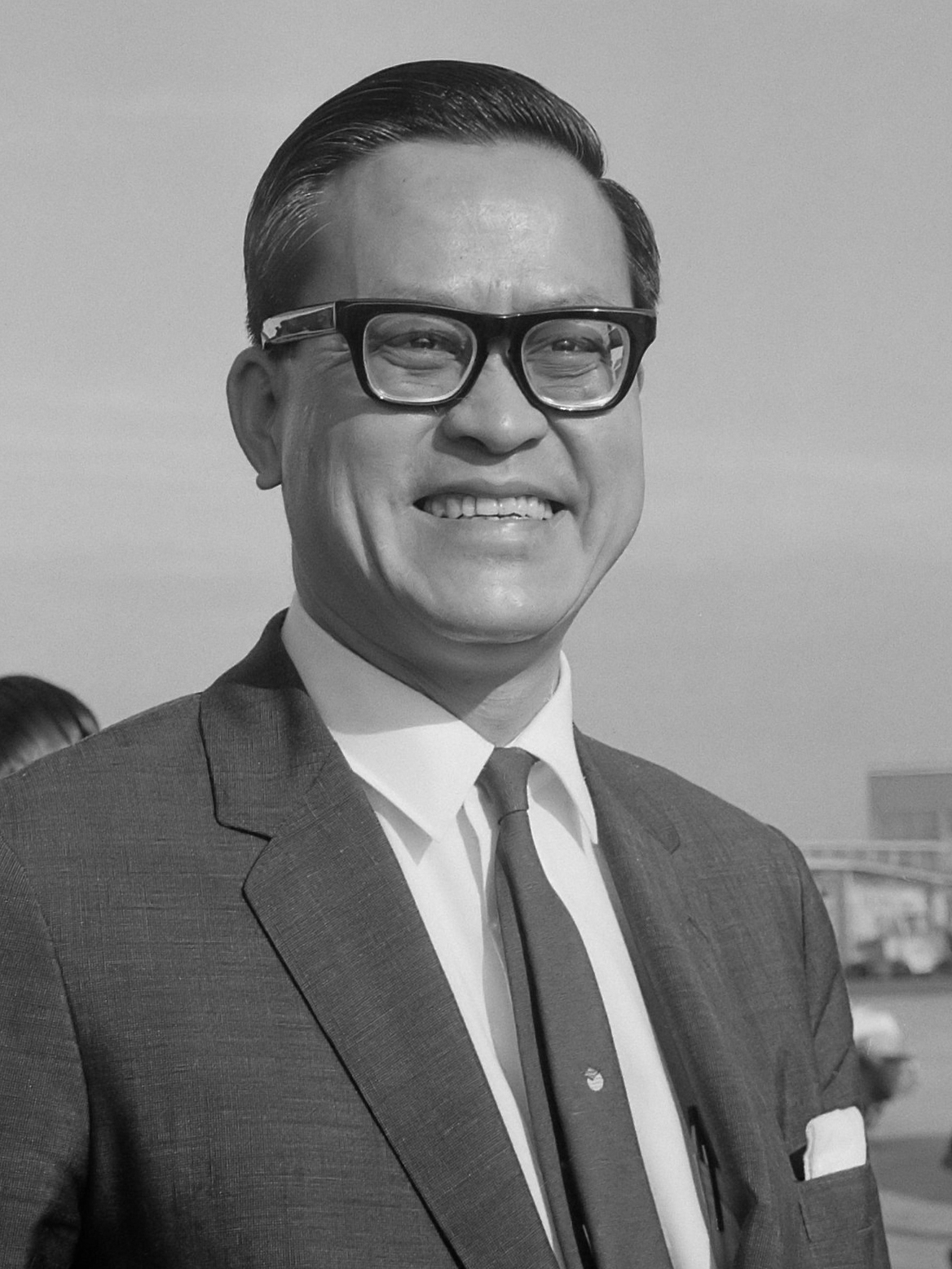
- Yong in 1965

Minister for Communications
- In office 16 April 1968 – 31 July 1975
- Prime Minister: Lee Kuan Yew
- Preceded by: Office established
- Succeeded by: Lim Kim San

Minister for Health
- In office 18 October 1963 – 15 April 1968
- Prime Minister: Lee Kuan Yew
- Preceded by: K. M. Byrne
- Succeeded by: Chua Sian Chin

Minister for Education
- In office 5 June 1959 – 18 October 1963
- Prime Minister: Lee Kuan Yew
- Preceded by: Lim Yew Hock
- Succeeded by: Ong Pang Boon

Member of the Malaysian Parliament for Singapore
- In office 2 November 1963 – 9 August 1965
- Preceded by: Position established
- Succeeded by: Position abolished

Member of the Singapore Parliament for Geylang West Constituency (Note: Formerly the Legislative Assembly from 1959 to 1965.)
- In office 30 May 1959 – 22 January 1979
- Preceded by: Constituency established
- Succeeded by: Teh Cheang Wan

Personal details
- Born: Yong Nyuk Lin; 24 June 1918 Seremban, British Malaya
- Died: 29 June 2012 (aged 94) Singapore
- Party: People's Action Party (1959–1980)
- Spouse: Kwa Geok Lan (m. 1939)
- Children: 2
- Education: Raffles College
- Occupation: Politician

Yong Nyuk Lin (Note: Chinese: 杨玉麟; Pha̍k-fa-sṳ: Yòng Ngiu̍k-lìn; pinyin: Yáng Yùlín) (24 June 1918 – 29 June 2012) was a Singaporean politician who served as the Minister for Communications between 1968 and 1975, Minister for Health between 1963 and 1968, and Minister for Education between 1959 and 1963.

A member of the governing People's Action Party (PAP), he was the Member of Parliament (MP) for Geylang West Constituency between 1959 and 1979. Yong also served as Singapore's High Commissioner to the United Kingdom between 1975 and 1977.

== Early life and education ==
Yong was born on 24 June 1918 in Seremban, Negri Sembilan and studied in Singapore at Raffles College, graduating with a degree in Science.

He worked as a science teacher before switching to insurance, where he joined Overseas Assurance Company in 1941. He served as the general manager of Overseas Assurance Company for 18 years before he resigned to stand for the 1959 general election in Singapore.

== Political career ==
=== MP for Geylang West SMC (1959–1979) ===
At the 1959 general election, he contested for Member of Parliament (MP) for Geylang West Single Member Constituency (SMC) against Kwek Sam Hock from Singapore People's Alliance. He was elected with 67.60% of the vote.

In the 1963 general election, Yong contested as MP for Geylang West SMC again, against Un Hon Kun from Barisan Sosialis, Kum Teng Hock from United People's Party, and Mohd. bin Haji Ya'acob from Singapore Alliance Party. He was elected with 43.635% of the vote.

In the 1968 general election, he contested for MP for Geylang West SMC again and was elected unopposed in a walkover. In the next election, he contested for Geylang West SMC again against Quek Doh Lam of Workers' Party, Yong was elected with 69.28% of the vote.

In the 1976 general election, Yong contested for MP of Geylang West SMC again, against Lim Tiong Hock from United Front. He was elected with 71.18% of the vote.

=== Minister for Education (1959–1963) ===
While he served as Minister for Education, he planned to overhaul Singapore's education system, introducing a unified education programme and making Malay the national language.

In 1959, Yong proposed building larger indoor sports halls with higher ceilings, suitable for playing badminton, as current indoor sports halls were about 25 feet.

He was also an advocate for education, stating that, "The past is history and heritage of the world. Education is a key to that treasury. The drain-sweeper is entitled to hold that key, and I am to see that he gets it."

In 1960, Yong proposed an idea of post-primary, where students who fail their Primary School Leaving Examination (PSLE) would take two more years of primary school before joining a normal secondary school. He also had plans for schools in the future to be multi-leveled, wanting schools to have 4 levels as the standard.

=== Minister for Health (1963–1968) ===
In 1963, Yong became the Minister for Health following a cabinet reshuffle. In 1964, he announced the S$1.5 million expansion of Thomson Road Hospital (now known as Toa Payoh Hospital). Yong had also stated plans to employ more doctors to help ease congestion in hospitals.

He opened the completed extension to Thomson Road Hospital in 1965. In 1966, Yong introduced a scheme at hospitals for victims of factory or traffic accidents to help pay for most of their expenses.

In 1967, he stated plans to halve Singapore's birthrate from 30 per thousand to 15 per thousand by 1970, by the time the five-year family planning programme, launched last year, ends.

=== Minister for Communications (1968–1975) ===
In 1968, while he served as the Minister for Communications, he proposed the idea of converting military bases for commercial use. In 1970, Yong announced the S$80 million expansion and development of Singapore Airport (now known as Changi Airport) over the next ten years. He also introduced the Area Licensing Scheme, which imposed tolls on motorists. In 1975, Yong stepped down as Minister for Communications after a cabinet reshuffle.

He retired in 1979 and worked as a director at Singapore Land Ltd.

== Personal life ==
In 1990, Yong received the Order of Nila Utama on National Day. His wife, Kwa Geok Lan, was the sister to lawyer Kwa Geok Choo making him the brother-in-law to the first Prime Minister Lee Kuan Yew.

=== Death ===
Yong died on 29 June 2012 at 94.

== Notes ==
Political offices
Preceded by Position established	Minister for Education; 1959-1963	Succeeded by Ong Pang Boon
Preceded by K. M. Byrne	Minister for Health; 1963-1968	Succeeded by Chua Sian Chin
Preceded by Position established	Minister for Communications; 1968-1975	Succeeded by Lim Kim San
Preceded by ?	High Commissioner to the United Kingdom; 1975-1977	Succeeded by Jek Yeun Thong
Parliament of Singapore
New constituency	Member of Parliament for Geylang West SMC; 1959-1980	Succeeded by Teh Cheang Wan
