= Abdul Rahim Ishak =

Singaporean politician and journalist (1925–2001)

- عبد الرحيم إسحاق
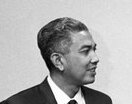
- Abdul at the UN Headquarters in 1967

Ambassador for Singapore to Indonesia
- In office 1974–1979

Minister of State for Foreign Affairs
- In office 1969–1972

Ambassador for Singapore to Yugoslavia, Ethiopia, and Lebanon
- In office 1969

Minister of State for Education
- In office 1965–1968

Ambassador for Singapore to United Arab Republic
- In office 1967

Member of the Singapore Parliament for Siglap Constituency (Note: Formerly the Legislative Assembly from 1963 to 1965.)
- In office 21 September 1963 – 4 December 1984
- Preceded by: Sahorah Ahmat
- Succeeded by: Abdullah Tarmugi

Member of the Malaysian Parliament for Singapore
- In office 2 November 1963 – 9 August 1965
- Preceded by: Position established
- Succeeded by: Position abolished

Personal details
- Born: Abdul Rahim bin Ishak; 25 July 1925 Singapore
- Died: 18 January 2001 (aged 75) Singapore
- Party: People's Action Party
- Spouse: Mawan Wajid Khan
- Children: 6
- Relatives: Yusof Ishak (brother)
- Education: Raffles College
- Occupation: Politician, diplomat, journalist

Abdul Rahim bin Ishak (Note: Jawi: عبد الرحيم بن إسحاق) (25 July 1925 – 18 January 2001) was a Singaporean politician, diplomat and journalist. A member of the People's Action Party (PAP), Abdul Rahim was a Member of Parliament (MP) for Siglap from 1963 to 1984. He was also a Minister of State for Education from 1965 to 1968 and the Minister of State for Foreign Affairs for 1969 to 1972.

Rahim served as the Ambassador Extraordinary and Plenipotentiary first to the United Arab Republic in 1967, Yugoslavia, Ethiopia, and Lebanon in 1969, and to Indonesia from 1974 to 1979. He became an envoy to New Zealand in July 1982. He was the youngest brother of Yusof Ishak, the first President of Singapore.

== Early life ==
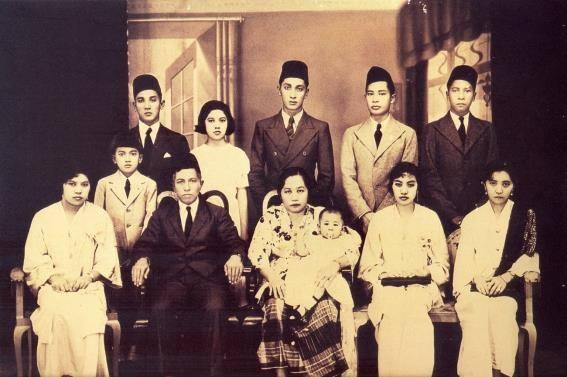
Rahim (bottom row, second from left) with his family c. 1933

Abdul Rahim bin Ishak was born on 25 July 1925 in Singapore. Rahim received his education at King Edward VII School in Perak and Raffles College in Singapore, and was eligible to be a teacher. He worked as a news journalist for the Utusan Melayu from 1947 to 1959.

== Career and personal life ==
As Rahim was an ethnic Malay within the PAP, he directly appealed to Malay voters during the short period when the PAP sought to create an opposition while Singapore was part of Malaysia.

Rahim served as Ambassador Extraordinary and Plenipotentiary first to the United Arab Republic in 1968, to Yugoslavia, Ethiopia, and Lebanon in 1969, and to Indonesia from 1974 to 1979. He became an envoy to New Zealand in July 1981, succeeding Lee Khoon Choy. He succeeded Chan Keng Howe as High Commissioner to New Zealand officially on 12 July 1981. Rahim's spouse, Mawan Wajid Khan, was the president of the Siglap Women's Association. They had six children, including a daughter named Lily Zubaidah Rahim.

== Later life and death ==
Rahim retired from his political career in 1984 and was rarely seen in public. In December 2000, he was hospitalised for treatment. He died on 18 January 2001 from an unspecified illness, aged 75. Many leaders in Asia offered their condolences.
