= Ong Pang Boon =

Singaporean politician

Ong Pang Boon DUNU
- 王邦文

Minister for the Environment
- In office 6 January 1981 – 1 January 1985
- Prime Minister: Lee Kuan Yew
- Preceded by: Lim Kim San
- Succeeded by: Ahmad Mattar

Minister for Labour
- In office 5 July 1971 – 6 January 1981
- Prime Minister: Lee Kuan Yew
- Preceded by: S. Rajaratnam
- Succeeded by: Ong Teng Cheong

Minister for Education
- In office 18 October 1963 – 6 September 1970
- Prime Minister: Lee Kuan Yew
- Preceded by: Yong Nyuk Lin
- Succeeded by: Lim Kim San

Minister for Home Affairs
- In office 11 August 1970 – 5 September 1970
- Prime Minister: Lee Kuan Yew
- Preceded by: Lim Kim San (as Minister for Interior and Defence)
- Succeeded by: Wong Lin Ken
- In office 5 June 1959 – 16 September 1963
- Preceded by: Office established
- Succeeded by: Goh Keng Swee (as Minister for Interior and Defence)

Deputy Mayor of Singapore
- In office 24 December 1957 – 18 April 1959
- Mayor: Ong Eng Guan
- Preceded by: Position established
- Succeeded by: Position abolished

Member of the Malaysian Parliament for Singapore
- In office 2 November 1963 – 9 August 1965
- Preceded by: Position established
- Succeeded by: Position abolished

Member of the Singapore Parliament for Telok Ayer Constituency (Note: Formerly the Legislative Assembly from 1959 to 1965.)
- In office 30 May 1959 – 17 August 1988
- Preceded by: Rajabali Jumabhoy (INDP)
- Succeeded by: Constituency abolished

Member of the City Council of Singapore for Tanjong Pagar Constituency
- In office 21 December 1957 – 18 April 1959
- Preceded by: Constituency established
- Succeeded by: Constituency abolished

Personal details
- Born: Ong Pang Boon; 28 March 1929 (age 97) Kuala Lumpur, Selangor, Federated Malay States
- Citizenship: Singaporean
- Party: People's Action Party
- Spouse: Chan Choy Siong (m. 1961; died 1981)
- Education: National University of Singapore
- Occupation: Politician

Ong Pang Boon (Note: Chinese: 王邦文; Pe̍h-ōe-jī: Ông Pang-bûn; pinyin: Wáng Bāngwén) (born 28 March 1929) is a Singaporean retired politician who served as Minister for Home Affairs between 1959 and 1963 and again for a short period of time in 1970, Minister for Education between 1963 and 1970, Minister for Labour between 1971 and 1981, and Minister for the Environment between 1981 and 1985.

== Early life and education ==
Born in Kuala Lumpur during British colonial rule, Ong attended the Methodist Boys' School in Kuala Lumpur before enrolling into the University of Malaya at Singapore campus (now the National University of Singapore), where he studied geography. Ong's wife Chan Choy Siong, a politician and women's rights activist, died in a car accident in 1981, leaving behind her husband and their three children.

== Political career ==
In 1955, Ong's foray into politics began as a polling agent for Lee Kuan Yew in the 1955 legislative assembly election.

In 1956, Lee Kuan Yew wrote to Ong and offered him a job as party organising secretary for the PAP.

He stood for election in the 21 December 1957 for the fully elected City Council of Singapore as a candidate for the Tanjong Pagar ward and was successfully returned and became the first and only ever Deputy Mayor. He held the post until he resigned in April 1959 to contest the Legislative Assembly election as the PAP's candidate for Telok Ayer. This was to be the first Legislative Assembly in which all seats were elected. He won the seat, which he retained till his retirement in 1988. He was subsequently appointed as Minister for Home Affairs in the first self-government Cabinet and played a key role to eradicating yellow culture and crime in Singapore society. His cabinet appointment also made him part of the Internal Security Council which sanctioned Operation Coldstore in 1963.

From 1963 to 1970, Ong took on the highly sensitive Education ministerial portfolio at a time when Chinese language culture and education issues were highly politicised. By increasing the teaching of English in Chinese schools and vice versa, he was instrumental in laying the foundation for Singapore's bilingual language policy.

In 1970, Ong became the Labour Minister. In 1980, he took over as the Environment Minister. In 1984, he stepped down from the Cabinet to make way for younger leaders. However, he displayed some unhappiness at the pace and manner by which he was sidelined from the political scene. He retired from politics in 1988 when his constituency of Telok Ayer was eliminated in the 3 September 1988 general election. Lee recognised Ong's displeasure in a public letter of appreciation:

"... I agree with you. You also had misgivings (about some newcomers), as had Chin Chye (referring to Toh Chin Chye), over the speed of self-renewal and the effect it was having on the morale of the old guard MPs."

Ong is considered as one of the "Old Guard", the first generation of leaders of independent Singapore. He is the sole remaining living member, after Jek Yeun Thong's passing in June 2018.

== Philanthropic work ==
Ong continued to serve the society through his involvement in the community. Ong, who previously served as the vice-chairman of Singapore Hokkien Huay Kuan in the 2000s, is currently serving in the Board of Governors of the association.

== Awards and decorations ==
- Order of the Nila Utama (First Class), in 1990.

== Bibliography ==
- Lam, Peng Er and Tan, Kevin (Ed.) (2000). Lee's lieutenants : Singapore's old guard. Singapore: Allen & Unwin. ISBN 1-86508-172-8
