= Ministry of Interior and Defence =

The Ministry of Interior and Defence (MID) was a ministry of the Government of Singapore. It was established in 1965, with Goh Keng Swee as the inaugural minister. The ministry was responsible for both internal and external security, controlling both the police force and the armed forces.

As the differences between the police force and the armed forces became more defined, the ministry was eventually split into the current Ministry of Defence (MINDEF) and the Ministry of Home Affairs (MHA) on 11 August 1970.

== History ==
Following Singapore's independence from Malaysia in 1965, the nation faced significant security concerns. Externally, Singapore's leadership feared that Malay Ultras opposing the separation could influence Malaysian forces stationed in Singapore to act against the newly independent state. These concerns were heightened when Malaysian troops in Johor were placed on alert, leading Singapore's political leaders to perceive Singapore as highly vulnerable to foreign threats.

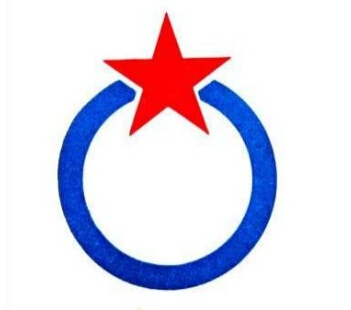
Barisan Sosialis Logo.

The Malaysian regiment's occupation of the second Singapore Infantry Regiment's (2 SIR) barracks at Temasek Camp was a point of contention between Singapore and neighbouring Malaysia. At the time, 2 SIR had been deployed to Sabah at Malaysia's request to engage in the Indonesia-Malaysia Confrontation (Konfrontasi). Malaysia maintained its right to utilise Singapore's military installations under the terms of the separation agreement. The Malaysian regiment remained until November 1967 in spite of the return of 2 SIR in February 1967 and Singapore's requests for their withdrawal, deepening Singapore's sense of vulnerability.

Internally, Singapore faced threats from domestic communism and ethno-religious extremism. The opposition party Barisan Sosialis was linked to communist elements, raising concerns over internal subversion. At public events, former Prime Minister Lee Kuan Yew expressed his view of the communist movement as an existential danger to Singapore's stability, emphasising the need for Singapore to safeguard itself against external and internal threats. These concerns were not unfounded, as civil unrest in Malaysia formed the precursor to race riots in multi-ethnic Singapore.

In response to these multi-dimensional threats, the government recognised the importance of a cohesive and integrated approach to national security. In October 1965, the Ministry of Interior and Defence (MID) was established to address these concerns. Goh Keng Swee was appointed as the first Minister for Interior and Defence, tasked with the critical role of building a capable defence force from the ground up. A key initiative of the MID was the integration of the Singapore Police Force (SPF) into the Singapore Armed Forces (SAF), leveraging police experience in maintaining internal security and training the new SAF recruits. The SAF was also designated to assume internal security roles during times of severe unrest.

== Building the armed forces ==
=== Collaboration with foreign advisors ===
The initial focus of the MID was the rapid development of the SAF. Recognising the urgent need for a credible defence force amid the ongoing Indonesia–Malaysia confrontation and the British military draw-down East of Suez, Goh acted swiftly in making strategic decisions. He appointed George Bogaars, the former Head of Special Branch, as Permanent Secretary of the MID for his experience in security and intelligence. Acknowledging the lack of local defence expertise, Goh sought external advice and assistance from non-aligned countries like India, Switzerland, and Egypt without success, before securing defence support from Israel.

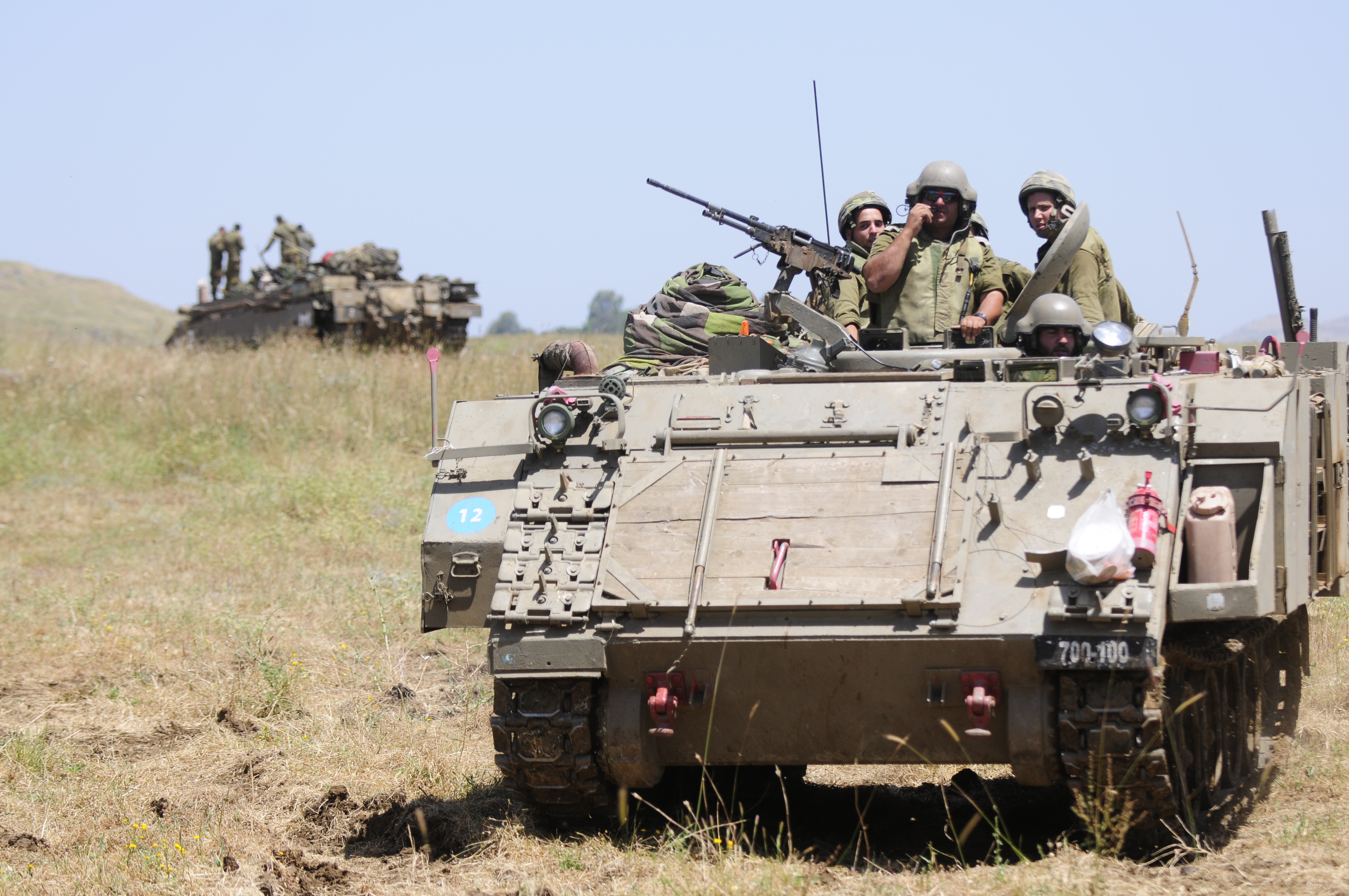
IDF soldiers conducting a battalion drill.

In November 1965, the first group of advisors from the Israel Defence Forces (IDF) arrived discreetly in Singapore, codenamed as "Mexicans" to avoid offending the local and regional Malay-Muslim population. This partnership led to the formulation of a confidential defence plan in 1966, which involved modelling the SAF after the Israeli army's military doctrine, weapons platforms and universal conscription system, with the exception of national service for women. Over a ten-year period, the plan intended to expand the army to twelve battalions by mobilising Singapore's male population.

=== Establishment of military institutions ===
The development of the SAF was guided by two critical documents provided by the Israeli teams: the "Brown Book", which contained chapters detailing the establishment of Singapore's infantry and combat doctrine, and the "Blue Book", serving as a template for Singapore's defence ministry and intelligence units. On 24 December 1965, the Israeli team began to supervise the establishment of the first SAF military base, designed by the Israeli Engineering Corps.

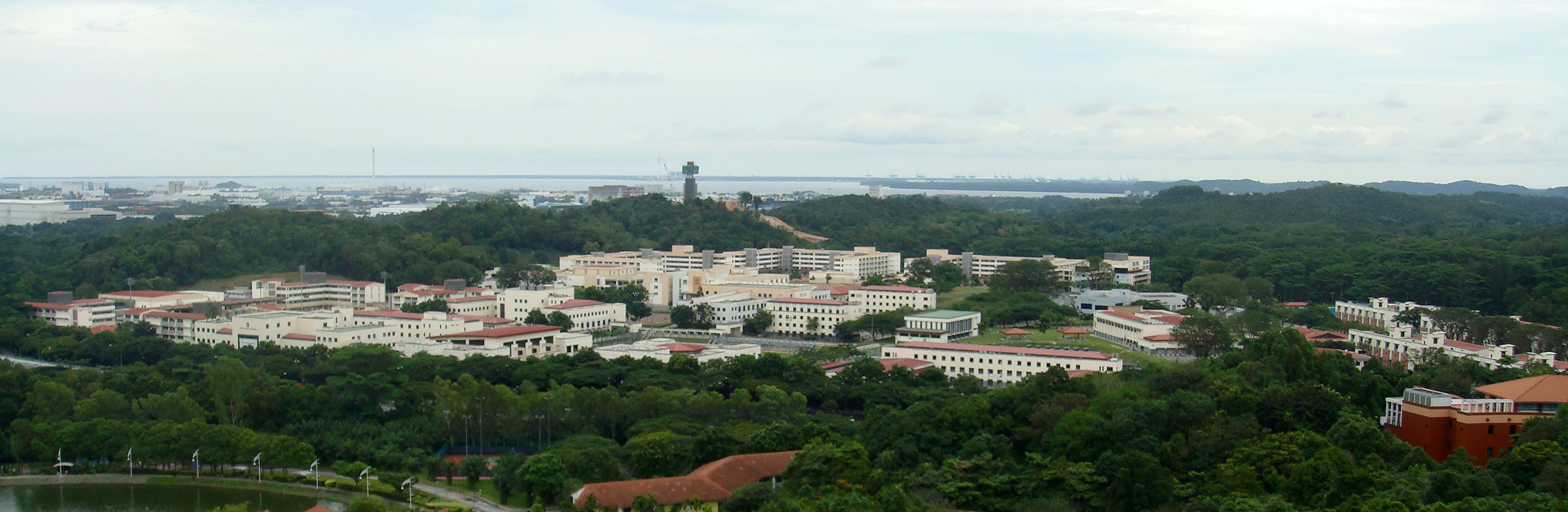
SAFTI was opened at Pasir Laba Camp.

Under the leadership of Brigadier-General Kirpa Ram Vij, the Singapore Armed Forces Training Institute (SAFTI) was established in February 1966 to build the requisite military infrastructure. The Israeli team was also involved in conducting training at SAFTI, ranging from recruit training to advanced courses for platoon commanders and officers. In an unorthodox move, Goh selected Jesuit priest Father Terence J. Sheridan to draft the SAF code of conduct in 1967, aiming to instil strong moral values within the armed forces. In June 1966, the first batch of 140 officer cadets began their training, with 117 successfully receiving their commissions in July 1967. To register the incoming conscripts, the Central Manpower Base (CMPB) was established.

=== Introduction of national service ===
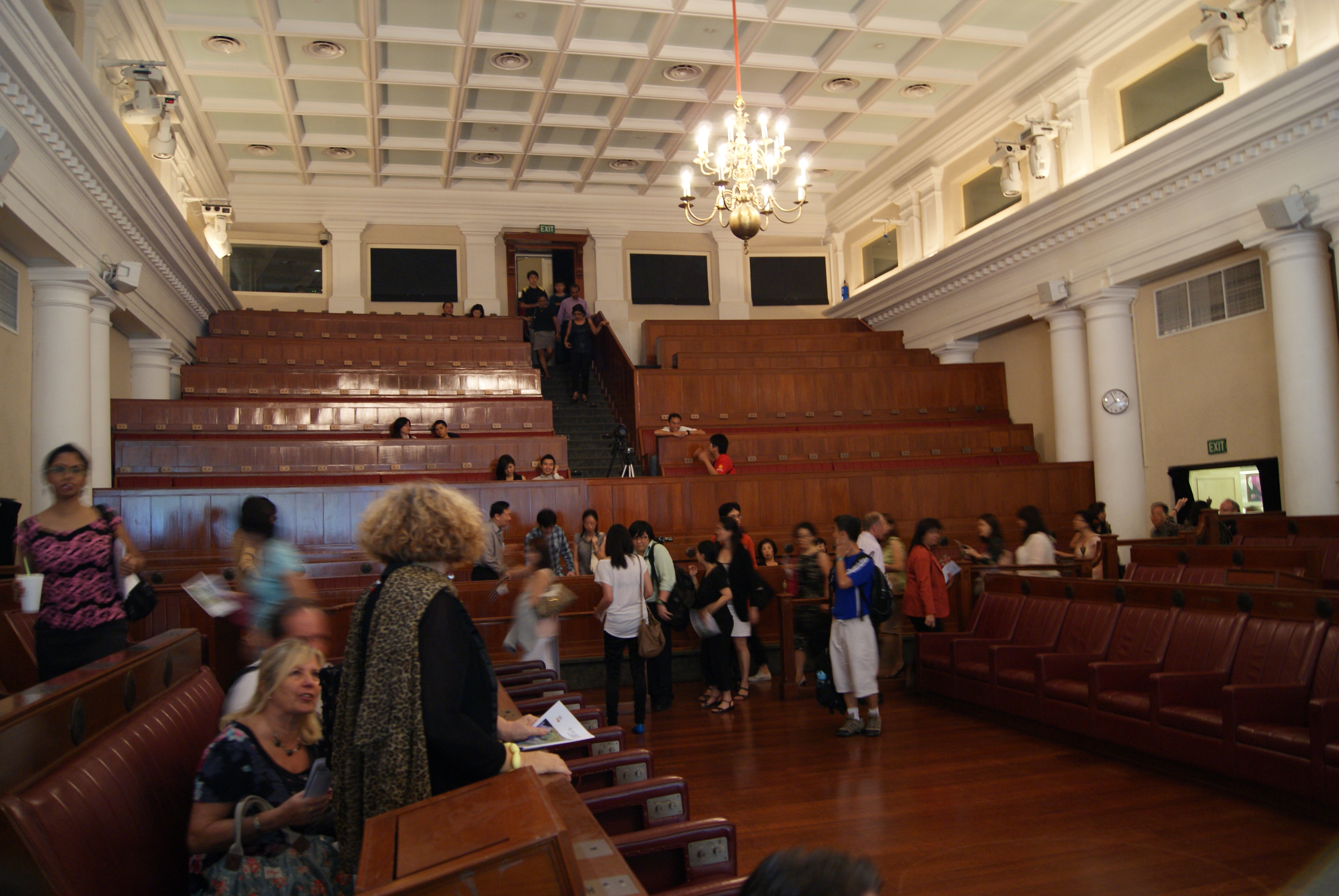
Former Parliamentary Chamber, the Arts House at the Old Parliament Singapore.

On 27 February 1967, the National Service (Amendment) Bill was introduced in parliament by the Singapore government. The bill would enforce the registration of all 18-year-old male Singapore citizens and permanent residents for part-time national service spanning 12 years. These conscripts would serve in volunteer-dependent organisations such as the People's Defence Force (PDF), Vigilante Corps, and the Special Constabulary. Due to limited facilities and training personnel, only 10% of these individuals, often from well-educated backgrounds, were selected for full-time national service. These full-time national servicemen were required to serve between two and three years in the SAF and subsequently fulfil reserve duties until the age of 40.

During the second reading of the bill on 13 March 1967, the Minister for Interior and Defence Goh Keng Swee justified its necessity on the grounds of national security and nation-building. He argued that without a robust defence force, Singapore would be rendered subservient to whoever could provide it protection, jeopardising its sovereignty and causing instability in the region. On the other hand, a well-defended Singapore could contribute substantially towards future defence arrangements and act as a stabilising force in Southeast Asia. He also emphasised that national service would foster loyalty and national consciousness among the diverse population, supporting the development of a strong national identity.

Anti-conscription demonstrations by left-wing activists took place between 1967 and 1968. However, the bill passed smoothly in the People's Action Party (PAP)-dominated Parliament on 14 March 1967. In 1967, the first batch of 900 full-time national servicemen was enlisted, leading to the formation of the 3rd and 4th Singapore Infantry Regiments (SIR).

== Early defence posture ==
=== The "poisonous shrimp" doctrine ===
Post independence, Singapore suffered security constraints due to its small geographical size, lack of strategic depth, and limited military capabilities. In light of these vulnerabilities, the MID was motivated to adopt the "poisonous shrimp" strategy as its initial defence posture.

=== Origins of the doctrine ===
The metaphor was first articulated by then-Prime Minister Lee Kuan Yew in 1966, who stated that in a world where "big fish eat small fish and the small fish eat shrimp", Singapore must become a "poisonous shrimp"—small but lethal if swallowed. This concept emphasised ensuring that any aggressor would suffer unacceptable losses if they attempted an invasion, thereby deterring potential attacks.

=== Key elements ===
- Defence at the Water's Edge: The strategy focused on defending Singapore along its coastline to prevent enemy forces from establishing a foothold on the island.
- Urban Warfare: If coastal defences were breached, the plan envisioned engaging in close urban combat similar to the Battle of Stalingrad, aiming to maximise difficulties for the invader and inflict significant casualties.
- Maximising Aggressor Costs: By raising the human and material costs of aggression to disproportionate levels, Singapore aimed to deter potential adversaries despite its limited offensive capabilities.

=== Implementation ===
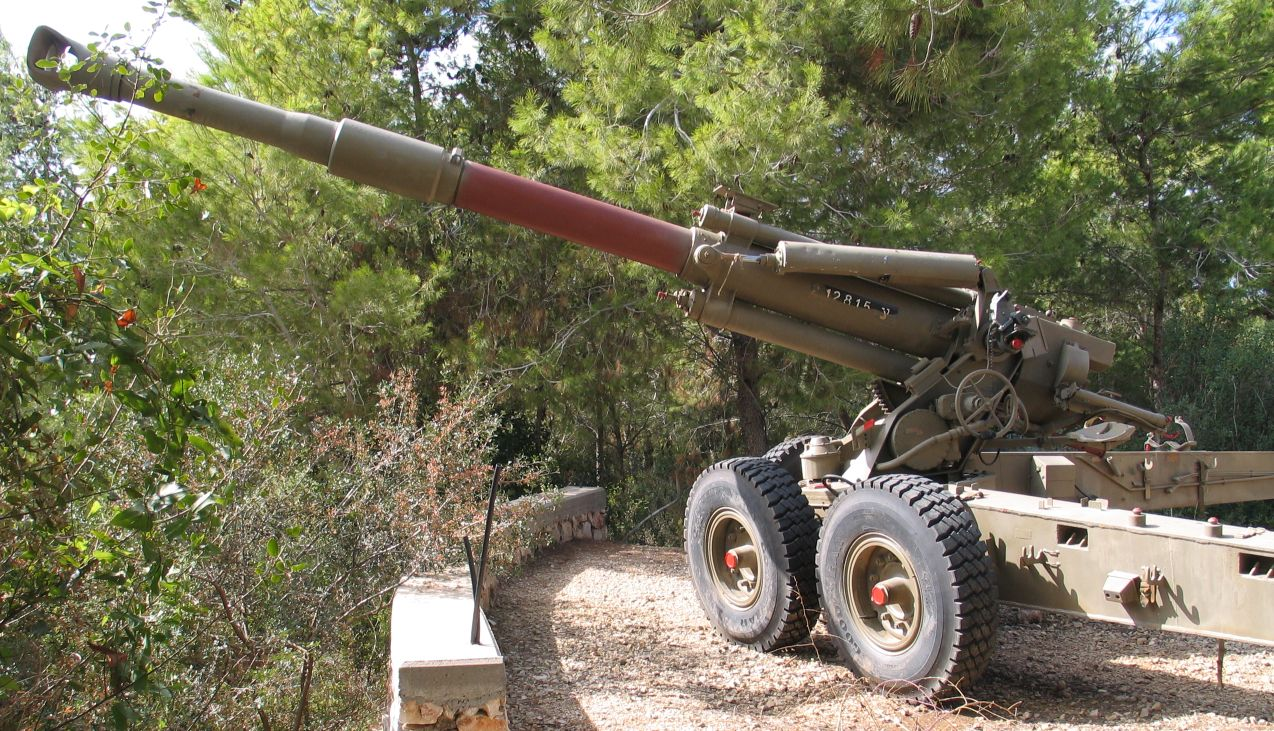
Soltam M-71 155mm howitzer.

In its early years, Singapore lacked the manpower, firepower, and mobility to conduct offensive operations. To compensate for these deficiencies, it focused on:

- Equipping the SAF: Singapore sought to enhance its military capabilities by acquiring advanced weaponry. Israel became a key supplier of defence equipment and technology due to the battle-tested and superior quality of Israeli weapons. Mirroring Israel's military doctrine, the SAF procured its earliest artillery systems from Israel, such as the Soltam 60mm and 81mm mortars, later introducing 155mm and 160mm variants in the 1970s and 1980s respectively.
- Psychological Deterrence: The presence of Israeli military advisors was initially kept confidential to avoid triggering diplomatic sensitivities. However, during the commissioning parade of the first batch of officer cadets on 16 July 1967, Goh Keng Swee publicly acknowledged their involvement in building the SAF. This disclosure, following the Israeli victory in the Six-Day War, served as a psychological deterrent by signalling that the SAF was trained by experienced Israeli forces.

=== Criticism and evolution ===
While the "poisonous shrimp" strategy served Singapore well in its infancy, its main flaw was in being inherently defeatist. The doctrine implicitly acknowledged that Singapore might ultimately be overrun, aiming only to ensure that the aggressor suffered severe losses in the process. This approach risked the nation's existence as a sovereign entity.

After the division of the MID in 1970, the SAF's significant growth and enhanced capabilities began to contradict the premises of the "poisonous shrimp" doctrine. The successful implementation of National Service saw a substantial increase in manpower, with the SAF expanding by 433% between 1965 and 1978. The modern weaponry acquired by the SAF also enabled it to surpass the capabilities of neighbouring countries like Malaysia and Indonesia. Recognising these developments, Singapore's defence ministry began transitioning towards the Second Generation SAF (2G SAF), with greater emphasis on offensive preemption and forward defence.

== Responding to regional tensions ==
In May 1969, following the loss of United Malays National Organisation (UMNO) in the 1969 Malaysian general election, Malaysia experienced an episode of violent Chinese-Malay clashes in Kuala Lumpur known as the 13 May Incident. The civil unrest resulted in a spillover of ethnic violence across the Johor-Singapore Causeway in the form of the 1969 race riots of Singapore. In response to the racial riots, the MID fully mobilised the SAF to assist the police in restoring public order.

Concurrently, Singapore received repeated threats that the Malay Ultras would cut Singapore's water supply from Johor, a critical vulnerability given that Singapore imported a significant proportion of its freshwater from Malaysia under the 1961 and 1962 Water Agreements.

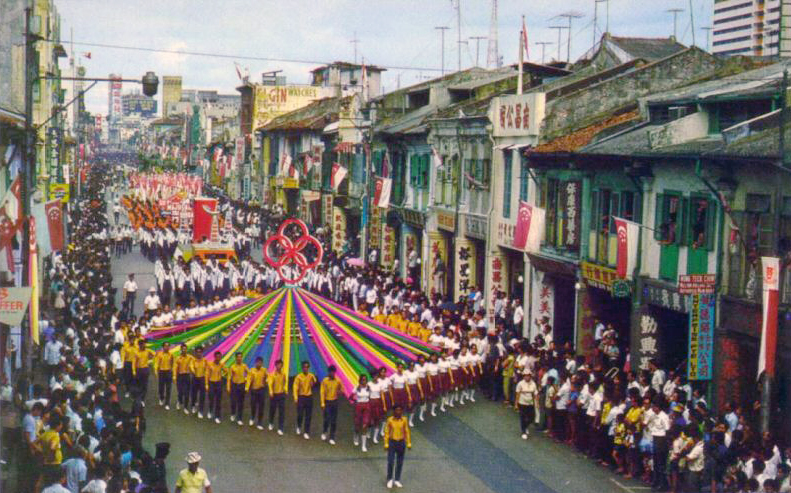
Singapore National Day Parade in 1968.

Amid rising Malay nationalism in Malaysia, Singapore took the initiative to enhance its armoured warfare capacity by procuring 72 AMX-13 light tanks from Israel in January 1968. In a political act to assert its military prowess, Singapore made the calculated move of showcasing a mobile column of AMX-13 and V200 armoured vehicles during its National Day Parade on 9 August 1969, during which the Malaysian Prime Minister and other foreign delegates were in attendance. Within the same year, Singapore established formal diplomatic relations with Israel. These actions were part of the same political calculus to deter would-be aggressors in the region.

== Ministers ==
The ministry was previously headed by the Minister for the Interior and Defence, who was appointed as part of the Cabinet of Singapore.

Minister	Term	Ref.
Goh Keng Swee	9 August 1965 – 16 August 1967	
Lim Kim San	17 August 1967 – 10 August 1970	

== Dissolution and legacy ==
The evolving security landscape in the late 1960s required a reorganisation of Singapore's defence and security apparatus. On 11 August 1970, the MID was officially divided into two separate entities: MINDEF and MHA.

=== Shift towards external defence ===
Singapore's rapid economic growth had significantly diminished internal security threats by the early 1970s. Under the purview of the MID, the Internal Security Department (ISD) and its employment of anti-subversion laws were effective in curtailing the operations of pro-communist and communalist elements. Although the Malayan Communist Party (MCP) remained active in staging bombings and arson attacks from 1970 to 1971, these were deemed as largely inconsequential to the government. By 1994, Singapore's government had declared the country free from the threat of communist insurgency.

However, external security concerns remained. Singapore's historical trauma from the Japanese occupation and its terse relations with neighbouring countries reinforced the necessity of strengthening its external defence. Due to lingering fears that some Malaysian leaders believed Singapore should be forcefully re-assimilated, tensions with Malaysia persisted. Occasional remarks from regional politicians provoked wariness, including a loaded comment by Indonesian president B.J. Habibie to second Minister for Defence Teo Chee Hean: "Singapore lies inside [Indonesia]". As a result, the city-state invested consistently in strengthening the SAF.

=== Organisational changes ===
The division of the MID into MINDEF and MHA enabled more focused control over the internal and external spheres of Singapore's security.

- The Ministry of Defence (Singapore) was charged with overseeing the SAF and building its conventional military capabilities. After the split, the SAF's role shifted predominantly towards external defence, and by the early 1970s its involvement in internal security was highly limited. While SAF units participated in internal security exercises with the police up till 1986, its primary mission became centred on countering external aggression.

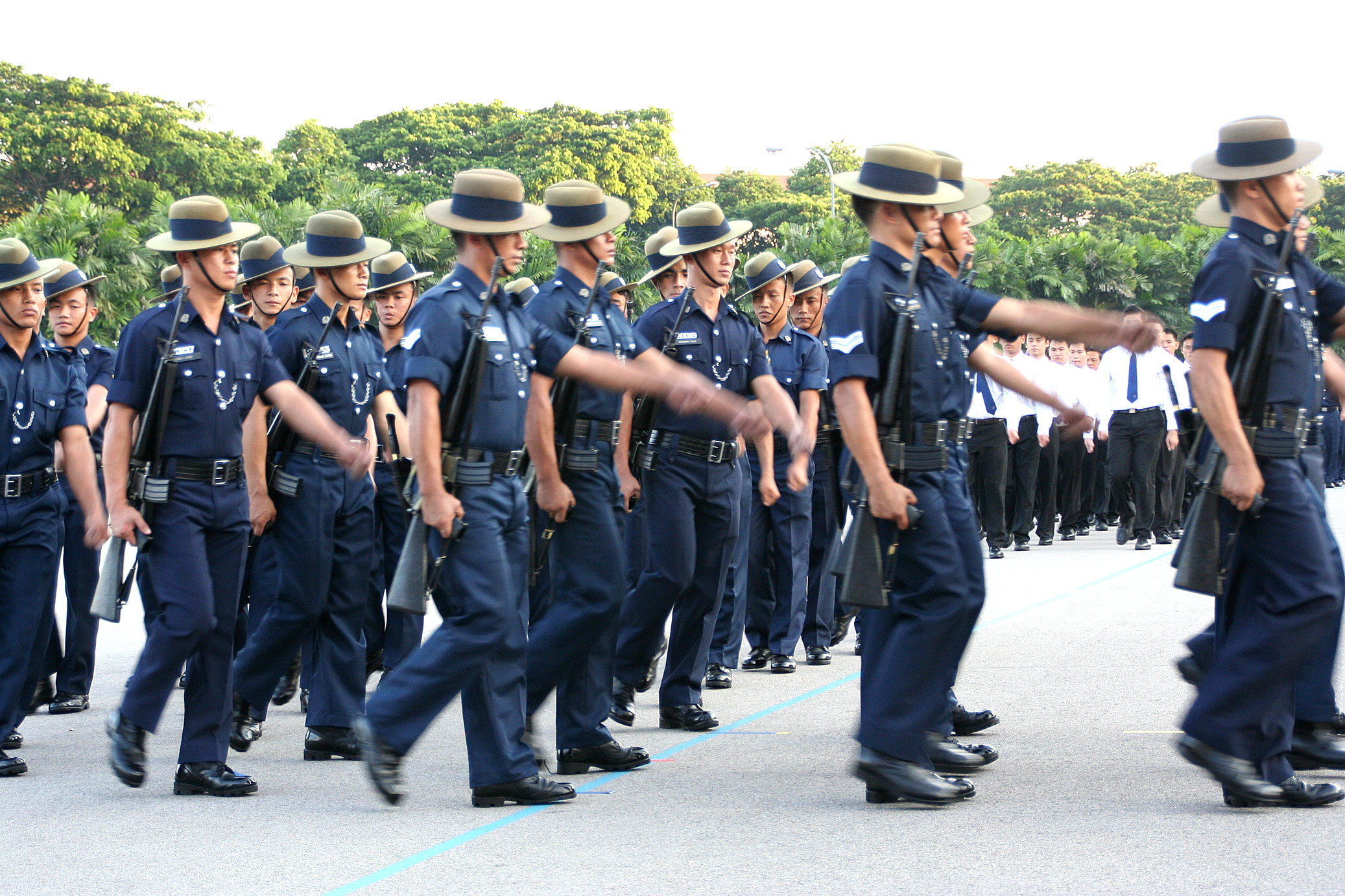
Singapore Gurkha Contingent

- The Ministry of Home Affairs (Singapore) assumed responsibility for internal security matters, taking control of the SPF, the ISD, and other homeland security agencies. To improve Singapore's capacity in responding to riots and ethnic clashes, the government expanded the Police Reserve Units (later known as the Police Tactical Unit) and the Gurkha Contingent, with the Gurkha Contingent particularly valued as a neutral force for handling race-related conflicts.

=== Legacy ===
A legacy of the ministry can be found in the vehicle registration plates of vehicles belonging to the Singapore Armed Forces, bearing "MID".

== Bibliography ==
- Wicaksono, William Hendro (2020). Strategic Planning or Innovation Institutionalization? The Case of Singapore Armed Forces' Modernization (PDF) (Doctoral dissertation). Monterey, California: Naval Postgraduate School.
- Ng, Patrick Shih Yuen (2005). From 'Poisonous Shrimp' to 'Porcupine': An Analysis of Singapore's Defence Posture Change in the Early 1980s (Master's thesis). Singapore: Nanyang Technological University.
- Ho, Peter (2015). "Organising for National Security – The Singapore Experience". In Desker, Barry; Tan, Chung (eds.). Perspectives on the Security of Singapore: The First 50 Years. World Scientific Publishing. pp. 285–294. doi:10.1142/9789814689342_0017. ISBN 978-981-4689-32-8.
- Yong, Tan Tai (2001). "Singapore: Civil-Military Fusion". In Alagappa, Muthiah (ed.). Coercion and Governance: The Declining Political Role of the Military in Asia. Stanford University Press. pp. 276–293. doi:10.1515/9780804779234-017. ISBN 978-0-8047-7923-4.
- Goh, Chok Tong (7 September 2002). "Speech by Prime Minister Goh Chok Tong at the 35 Years of National Service Commemoration Dinner". Ministry of Information, Communications and the Arts.
