= Lee Khoon Choy =

Singaporean politician

Lee Khoon Choy DUBC
- 李炯才
- Lee in 1967

Member of the Singapore Parliament for Braddell Heights Constituency
- In office 7 February 1977 – 4 December 1984
- Preceded by: Constituency established
- Succeeded by: Goh Choon Kang
- Majority: 1976: N/A (walkover); 1980: N/A (walkover)

Member of the Singapore Parliament for Hong Lim Constituency
- In office 8 December 1965 – 6 December 1976
- Preceded by: Ong Eng Guan
- Succeeded by: Constituency abolished

Member of the Legislative Assembly for Bukit Panjang Constituency
- In office 1 July 1959 – 3 September 1963
- Preceded by: Goh Tong Liang
- Succeeded by: Ong Lian Teng

Party Whip of the People's Action Party
- In office 23 June 1959 – 16 October 1963
- Preceded by: Position established
- Succeeded by: Chan Chee Seng

Personal details
- Born: 29 January 1924 Butterworth, Penang, British Malaya (now Malaysia)
- Died: 27 February 2016 (aged 92) Singapore
- Party: People's Action Party
- Spouses: Florence Khor Swee Hoon (died 1959) Eng Ah Siam (m. 1962)
- Children: 2 with Khor, 5 with Eng
- Education: Regent Street Polytechnic

Lee Khoon Choy (Note: Chinese: 李炯才; Pha̍k-fa-sṳ: Lí Kuén-chhòi; pinyin: Lǐ Jǐongcái) (29 January 1924 – 27 February 2016) was a Singaporean politician who served as the first Party Whip of the People's Action Party from 1959 to 1963. A member of the governing People's Action Party, he was the Member of Parliament for the Bukit Panjang Constituency from 1959 to 1963, Hong Lim Constituency from 1965 to 1976, and Braddell Heights Constituency from 1977 to 1984.

== Early life and education ==
Lee Khoon Choy was born on 29 January 1924 in Butterworth, Penang, to a Hakka family. He was educated at Yeok Keow Chinese School and Chung Ling High School in George Town.

During the Japanese occupation of Malaya, he took refuge in his uncle's farm located in a jungle.

He left Singapore for London in 1949 to study journalism at Regent Street Polytechnic on a year long scholarship.

== Career ==
In 1946 Lee commenced a career in journalism in Penang with Sin Pin Jit Poh, then left for Singapore to work for a number of Chinese (Sin Chew Jit Poh, Nanyang Siang Pau) and English (Singapore Tiger Standard) newspapers before culminating in his working for The Straits Times in 1957.

=== Politics ===
==== Member of Parliament ====
Resigning in 1959, Lee commenced his political career and was elected to the legislative assembly. He served as Minister of State for Culture, Minister of State in the Prime Minister's Office (PMO), Senior Minister of State for Foreign Affairs, and Senior Minister of State in PMO. He stepped down from his parliamentary positions in 1984.

==== Diplomat ====
In 1968 he commenced his diplomatic career, serving as Singapore's Ambassador to Egypt, Ethiopia, Yugoslavia, Lebanon and Indonesia, and High Commissioner in Pakistan. On stepping down from Parliament, he served as Singapore's Ambassador to Japan and South Korea.

=== Post politics ===
He retired from public service in 1988, founding his own firm, Eng Lee Investment Consultants, in 1990.

He has been and is a director of a number of companies. He is currently Chairman of Eng Lee Investment Consultants, and an Independent non-executive director of Koh Brothers Group Ltd. Previous positions held include:

- Chairman, Sino-American (UIC) Tours Corporation
- Independent director, Metro Holdings
- Non-Executive chairman, SSH Corporation (formerly known as Sin Soon Huat)
- Independent director, L & M Group Investments

== Bibliography ==
Lee has published ten books, including:

- Lee, Khoon Choy (2013) Lee, Khoon Choy (2013). Golden Dragon and Purple Phoenix: The Chinese and Their Multi-Ethnic Descendants in Southeast Asia. Hackensack, New Jersey: World Scientific. p. 604. doi:10.1142/8357. ISBN 978-981-4383-43-1.
- Lee, Khoon Choy (2005) Choy, Lee Khoon (2005). Pioneers of Modern China: Understanding the Inscrutable Chinese. Hackensack, New Jersey: World Scientific. p. 576. doi:10.1142/5921. ISBN 978-981-256-618-8.
- Lee, Khoon Choy (1999) A fragile nation: the Indonesian crisis. World Scientific Publishing.
- Lee, Khoon Choy (1995) Japan: Between Myth and Reality. World Scientific Publishing. ISBN 9810218656, 9789810218652.
- Lee, Khoon Choy (1993) Diplomacy of a Tiny State. World Scientific Publishing. ISBN 9810212194.
- Lee, Khoon Choy (1976) Indonesia: Between Myth and Reality.

== Personal life ==
Lee married Florence Khor Swee Hoon, and they had two sons. Khor died at the age 30 on 26 October 1959. In 1962, Lee married Eng Ah Siam, with whom he has had five daughters.

Lee died in his sleep at home aged 92, at 3am on 27 February 2016. He is survived by his second wife, seven children and 11 grandchildren.

== Honours and awards ==
- 1974: (Indonesian) Bintang Bakti Utama (Meritorious Service Star) for his work in enhancing relations between Indonesia and Singapore.
- 1986: The Scholarly Achievement Award by the Japan Institute of Oriental Philosophy for his achievements in the research and development of eastern philosophy, thought and culture.
- 1988: (South Korean) Order of Diplomatic Service Merit for his service in promoting relations between South Korea and Singapore.
- 1990: Darjah Utama Bakti Cemerlang (Distinguished Service Order) in recognition of his contributions.
- 1997: Made an honorary member of the Chinese National Academy of Social Sciences in Beijing for his contributions in the field of humanities and social sciences.
