= Siglap Single Member Constituency =

Historical constituency of Singapore

Siglap Single Member Constituency was a constituency spanning Chinatown and Raffles Place in Singapore. It used to exist from 1959 to 1988 as Siglap Constituency and was renamed as Siglap Single Member Constituency (SMC) as part of Singapore's political reforms. The SMC was merged into Bedok Group Representation Constituency in 1991.

== Member of Parliament ==
Election	Incumbent	Party
1959	Sahorah bte Ahmat	PAP
1963	Abdul Rahim Ishak	PAP
1968	Abdul Rahim Ishak	PAP
1972	Abdul Rahim Ishak	PAP
1976	Abdul Rahim Ishak	PAP
1980	Abdul Rahim Ishak	PAP
1984	Abdullah Tarmugi	PAP
1988	Abdullah Tarmugi	PAP

== Electoral results ==
Note: The Elections Department does not include rejected votes when calculating the vote shares of candidates. Hence, all candidates' vote shares will total to 100% at any given election (may not appear so in multi-way contests due to rounding).

=== Elections in 1950s ===
General Election 1959: Siglap
Party	Candidate	Votes	%	±%
PAP	Sahorah bte Ahmat	4,407	34.34	
Independent	Koh Tee Kin	3,408	26.56	
LSP	John Snodgrass	1,511	11.78	
PKMS	Mohamed Sidik bin Haji Abdul Hamid	1,418	11.05	
Independent	Abdullah Masood	1,267	9.87	
Partai Ra'ayat	Pang Toon Tin	587	4.57	
PMIP	Wanjor bin Abubakar	234	1.83	
Turnout		12,892	87.7	
PAP win (new seat)				

=== Elections in 1960s ===
General Election 1963: Siglap
Party	Candidate	Votes	%	±%
PAP	Abdul Rahim bin Ishak	9,342	62.12	+27.78
Partai Ra'ayat	Tay Check Yaw	2,618	17.41	+12.84
SA	Soo Ban Hoe	1,488	9.89	−1.16
UPP	Ong Jin Teck	1,365	9.08	+9.08
Independent	Koh Tee Kin	225	1.50	−25.06
Turnout		15,128	95.1	+7.4
PAP hold		Swing	+27.78	

General Election 1968: Siglap
Party	Candidate	Votes	%	±%
PAP	Abdul Rahim bin Ishak	Walkover		
Turnout		11,627		
PAP hold		Swing		

=== Elections in 1970s ===
General Election 1972: Siglap
Party	Candidate	Votes	%	±%
PAP	Abdul Rahim Ishak	11,456	78.63	
WP	Ariffin Noordin	2,529	17.36	
United National Front	Yahiya bin Haji Mohamed Ghouse	584	4.01	
Turnout		14,844	92.3	
PAP hold		Swing		

General Election 1976: Siglap
Party	Candidate	Votes	%	±%
PAP	Abdul Rahim Ishak	9,733	78.20	−0.43
UF	Weerappulli K. W. B.	2,714	21.80	+21.80
Turnout		12,773	92.2	−0.1
PAP hold		Swing	-0.43	

=== Elections in 1980s ===
General Election 1980: Siglap
Party	Candidate	Votes	%	±%
PAP	Abdul Rahim Ishak	11,564	77.91	−0.29
WP	Royston George Scharenguivel	3,278	22.09	+22.09
Turnout		15,291	91.7	−0.5
PAP hold		Swing	-0.29	

General Election 1984: Siglap
Party	Candidate	Votes	%	±%
PAP	Abdullah Tarmugi	Walkover		
Turnout		17,090		
PAP hold		Swing		

General Election 1988: Siglap
Party	Candidate	Votes	%	±%
PAP	Abdullah Tarmugi	12,101	73.73	
WP	Chong Tung Shang	4,311	26.27	
Turnout		16,816	90.2	
PAP hold		Swing		
