= 4th Parliament of Singapore =

Singaporean parliamentary meeting

←	3rd	5th	→
- Initial composition Government: PAP (69)

Overview
- Legislative body: Parliament of Singapore
- Meeting place: Old Parliament House
- Term: 7 February 1977 – 5 December 1980 (3 years, 9 months and 28 days)
- Election: 23 December 1976
- Government: People's Action Party

Parliament of Singapore
- Members: 69
- Speaker: Yeoh Ghim Seng
- Leader of the House: E. W. Barker
- Prime Minister: Lee Kuan Yew
- Party control: PAP supermajority

Sessions
- 1st: 7 February 1977 – 2 October 1978 (1 year, 7 months and 25 days)
- 2nd: 26 December 1978 – 5 December 1980 (2 years, 11 months and 9 days)

The 4th Parliament of Singapore was a meeting of the Parliament of Singapore. Its first session commenced on 7 February 1977 and was prorogued on 2 October 1978. It commenced its second session on 26 December 1978 and was dissolved on 5 December 1980.

The members of the Fourth Parliament were elected in the 1976 general election. The Third Parliament was controlled by a People's Action Party majority, led by Prime Minister Lee Kuan Yew and his Cabinet. Yeoh Ghim Seng served as speaker.

The Fourth Parliament had eight changes throughout the term, with a series of four by-elections ensuing in 1977 and 1979, making it one of the largest change in the composition of Singapore's Parliament since the Barisan Sosialis boycotted the First Parliament in 1965.

== Results of the 1976 general election ==
Party	Votes	%	Seats	+/–
People's Action Party	590,169	74.09	69	▲4
Workers' Party	91,966	11.55	0	Steady
United Front	53,373	6.70	0	New
Barisan Sosialis	25,411	3.19	0	Steady
United People's Front	14,233	1.79	0	New
Singapore Malay National Organisation	9,230	1.16	0	Steady
Singapore Justice Party	5,199	0.65	0	New
People's Front	2,818	0.35	0	Steady
Independents	4,173	0.52	0	Steady
Total	796,572	100.00	69	▲4
Valid votes	796,572	97.72		
Invalid/blank votes	18,558	2.28		
Total votes	815,130	100.00		
Registered voters/turnout	1,095,817	95.08		
Source: Singapore Elections

== Officeholders ==
- Speaker: Yeoh Ghim Seng (Joo Chiat, PAP)
- Deputy Speaker: Tang See Chim (Chua Chu Kang, PAP), from 22 February 1977
- Prime Minister: Lee Kuan Yew (Tanjong Pagar, PAP)
- Deputy Prime Minister:
  - Goh Keng Swee (Kreta Ayer, PAP)
  - S. Rajaratnam (Kampong Glam, PAP), from 1 June 1980
- Leader of the House: E. W. Barker (Tanglin, PAP)
- Government Party Whip: Sia Kah Hui (Upper Serangoon, PAP)

== Composition ==
Political party	Members	
Political party	At election	At dissolution
People's Action Party	69	69
Total	69	69
Government majority	69	69

== Members ==
Constituency	Member	Party
Alexandra	Tan Soo Khoon 陈树群	PAP
Aljunied	Chin Harn Tong 钱翰琮	PAP
Ang Mo Kio	Yeo Toon Chia 杨敦清	PAP
Anson	P. Govindaswamy (until 1978) (Note: Govindaswamy died from a heart attack on 4 June 1978.) பி. கோவிந்தசாமி	PAP
Anson	Devan Nair (from 1979) (Note: Elected on 10 February 1979 in the 1979 by-elections.) ദേവൻ നായർ	PAP
Bedok	Sha'ari Tadin سهااري تادين	PAP
Boon Lay	Ngeow Pack Hua 饶柏华	PAP
Boon Teck	Phey Yew Kok 彭由国	PAP
Braddell Heights	Lee Khoon Choy 李炯才	PAP
Brickworks	Ahmad Mattar أحمد مطر	PAP
Bukit Batok	Chai Chong Yii 蔡崇语	PAP
Bukit Ho Swee	Seah Mui Kok 佘美国	PAP
Bukit Merah	Lim Guan Hoo (until 1977) (Note: Lim was removed from office on 1 July 1977 as he was in a coma from a stroke that he suffered on 13 February. He would die from complications arising from the stroke on 3 August.) 林源河	PAP
Bukit Merah	Lim Chee Onn (from 1977) (Note: Lim was elected on 23 July 1977 in the 1977 by-elections.) 林子安	PAP
Bukit Panjang	Lee Yiok Seng 李玉胜	PAP
Bukit Timah	Chor Yeok Eng 曹煜英	PAP
Buona Vista	Ang Kok Peng 洪国平	PAP
Cairnhill	Lim Kim San 林金山	PAP
Changi	Teo Chong Tee 张宗治	PAP
Chua Chu Kang	Tang See Chim 邓思沾	PAP
Delta	Yeo Choo Kok 杨子国	PAP
Farrer Park	Lee Chiaw Meng 李昭铭	PAP
Geylang East	Ho Cheng Choon 何振春	PAP
Geylang Serai	Rahmat Kenap رحمة كنڤ	PAP
Geylang West	Yong Nyuk Lin (until 1979) (Note: Resigned on 12 January 1979 to make way for new talent.) 杨玉麟	PAP
Geylang West	Teh Cheang Wan (from 1979) 郑章远	PAP
Havelock	Hon Sui Sen 韩瑞生	PAP
Henderson	Lai Tha Chai 黎达材	PAP
Jalan Besar	Chan Chee Seng 陈志成	PAP
Jalan Kayu	Hwang Soo Jin 黄树人	PAP
Joo Chiat	Yeoh Ghim Seng 杨锦成	PAP
Jurong	Ho Kah Leong 何家良	PAP
Kallang	S. Dhanabalan எஸ். தநபாலன்	PAP
Kampong Chai Chee	Fong Sip Chee 邝摄治	PAP
Kampong Glam	S. Rajaratnam எஸ். ராஜரத்தினம்	PAP
Kampong Kembangan	Mansor Sukaimi منصور سوكايمي	PAP
Kampong Ubi	Ya'acob Mohamed يعقوب محمد	PAP
Katong	J. F. Conceicao	PAP
Khe Bong	Ho See Beng 何思明	PAP
Kim Keat	Ong Teng Cheong 王鼎昌	PAP
Kim Seng	Ong Leong Boon 王龙文	PAP
Kolam Ayer	Sidek Saniff صديق صانف	PAP
Kreta Ayer	Goh Keng Swee 吴庆瑞	PAP
Kuo Chuan	P. Selvadurai பி. செல்வதுரை	PAP
Leng Kee	Ow Chin Hock 欧进福	PAP
MacPherson	Chua Sian Chin 蔡善进	PAP
Marine Parade	Goh Chok Tong 吴作栋	PAP
Moulmein	Lawrence Sia 谢坤祥	PAP
Mountbatten	Ng Yeow Chong (until 1979) 黄燿宗	PAP
Mountbatten	Eugene Yap (from 1979) 叶尧清	PAP
Nee Soon	Ong Soo Chuan (until 1979) 王书泉	PAP
Nee Soon	Koh Lip Lin (from 1979) 高立人	PAP
Pasir Panjang	Othman Wok عثمان ووك	PAP
Paya Lebar	Tan Cheng San 陈清山	PAP
Potong Pasir	Ivan Baptist (until 1979)	PAP
Potong Pasir	Howe Yoon Chong (from 1979) 侯永昌	PAP
Punggol	Ng Kah Ting 黄嘉腾	PAP
Queenstown	Jek Yeun Thong 易润堂	PAP
Radin Mas	N. Govindasamy (until 1977) (Note: Govindasamy died from a heart attack on 14 February 1977.) என். கோவிந்தசாமி	PAP
Radin Mas	Bernard Chen (from 1977) (Note: Chen was elected on 14 May 1977 in the 1977 by-elections.) 陈天立	PAP
River Valley	Tan Eng Liang 陈英梁	PAP
Rochore	Toh Chin Chye 杜进才	PAP
Sembawang	Teong Eng Siong (until 1979) 张永祥	PAP
Sembawang	Tony Tan (from 1979) 陈庆炎	PAP
Serangoon Gardens	Lau Teik Soon 刘德顺	PAP
Siglap	Abdul Rahim Ishak عبد الرحيم إسحاق	PAP
Tampines	Phua Bah Lee 潘峇厘	PAP
Tanglin	E. W. Barker	PAP
Tanjong Pagar	Lee Kuan Yew 李光耀	PAP
Telok Ayer	Ong Pang Boon 王邦文	PAP
Telok Blangah	Ahmad Haleem (until 1979) أحمد حليم	PAP
Telok Blangah	Rohan Kamis (from 1979) روحان خميس	PAP
Thomson	Ang Nam Piau 洪南标	PAP
Tiong Bahru	Ch'ng Jit Koon 庄日昆	PAP
Toa Payoh	Eric Cheong 张润志	PAP
Ulu Pandan	Chiang Hai Ding 张泰澄	PAP
Upper Serangoon	Sia Kah Hui 谢嘉惠	PAP
Whampoa	Augustine Tan 陈惠兴	PAP
