= 3rd Parliament of Singapore =

Singaporean parliamentary meeting

←	2nd	4th	→
- Initial composition Government: PAP (65)

Overview
- Legislative body: Parliament of Singapore
- Meeting place: Old Parliament House
- Term: 12 October 1972 – 6 December 1976 (4 years, 1 month and 24 days)
- Election: 2 September 1972
- Government: People's Action Party

Parliament of Singapore
- Members: 65
- Speaker: Yeoh Ghim Seng
- Leader of the House: E. W. Barker
- Prime Minister: Lee Kuan Yew
- Party control: PAP supermajority

Sessions
- 1st: 12 October 1972 – 6 December 1974 (2 years, 1 month and 24 days)
- 2nd: 21 February 1975 – 6 December 1976 (1 year, 9 months and 15 days)

The 3rd Parliament of Singapore was a meeting of the Parliament of Singapore. Its first session commenced on 12 October 1972 and was prorogued on 6 December 1974. It commenced its second session on 21 February 1975 and was dissolved on 6 December 1976.

The members of the Third Parliament were elected in the 1972 general election. The Third Parliament was controlled by a People's Action Party majority, led by Prime Minister Lee Kuan Yew and his Cabinet. Yeoh Ghim Seng served as speaker. The Third Parliament only saw one seat vacated, with Sepoy Lines Constituency MP Wee Toon Boon resigned on 11 September 1976, three months before dissolution.

== Results of the 1972 general election ==
Party	Votes	%	Seats	+/–
People's Action Party	524,892	73.85	65	▲7
Workers' Party	90,885	12.79	0	Steady
United National Front	55,001	7.74	0	New
Barisan Sosialis	0	0.00	0	New
People's Front	22,462	3.16	0	New
Singapore Malay National Organisation	10,054	1.41	0	New
Independents	7,462	1.05	0	Steady
Total	710,756	100.00	65	▲7
Valid votes	710,756	97.90		
Invalid/blank votes	15,229	2.10		
Total votes	725,985	100.00		
Registered voters/turnout	908,382	93.55		
Source: Singapore Elections

== Officeholders ==
- Speaker: Yeoh Ghim Seng (Joo Chiat, PAP)
- Deputy Speaker: Tang See Chim (Chua Chu Kang, PAP), from 22 November 1972
- Prime Minister: Lee Kuan Yew (Tanjong Pagar, PAP)
- Deputy Prime Minister: Goh Keng Swee (Kreta Ayer, PAP), from 1 March 1973
- Leader of the House: E. W. Barker (Tanglin, PAP)
- Government Party Whip: Sia Kah Hui (Upper Serangoon, PAP)

== Composition ==
Party	Members	
Party	At election	At dissolution
PAP	65	65
Vacant seats	0	1
Total	65	64
Government majority	65	64

== Members ==
Constituency	Member	Party
Alexandra	Wong Lin Ken 黄麟根	PAP
Aljunied	Chin Harn Tong 钱翰琮	PAP
Anson	P. Govindaswamy பி. கோவிந்தசாமி	PAP
Boon Teck	Phey Yew Kok 彭由国	PAP
Bras Basah	Ho See Beng 何思明	PAP
Bukit Batok	Chai Chong Yii 蔡崇语	PAP
Bukit Ho Swee	Seah Mui Kok 佘美国	PAP
Bukit Merah	Lim Guan Hoo 林源河	PAP
Bukit Panjang	Lee Yiok Seng 李玉胜	PAP
Bukit Timah	Chor Yeok Eng 曹煜英	PAP
Cairnhill	Lim Kim San 林金山	PAP
Changi	Sim Boon Woo 沈文武	PAP
Chua Chu Kang	Tang See Chim 邓思沾	PAP
Crawford	Ang Kok Peng 洪国平	PAP
Delta	Yeo Choo Kok 杨子国	PAP
Farrer Park	Lee Chiaw Meng 李昭铭	PAP
Geylang East	Ho Cheng Choon 何振春	PAP
Geylang Serai	Rahmat Kenap رحمة كنڤ	PAP
Geylang West	Yong Nyuk Lin 杨玉麟	PAP
Havelock	Hon Sui Sen 韩瑞生	PAP
Henderson	Lai Tha Chai 黎达材	PAP
Hong Lim	Lee Khoon Choy 李炯才	PAP
Jalan Besar	Chan Chee Seng 陈志成	PAP
Jalan Kayu	Hwang Soo Jin 黄树人	PAP
Joo Chiat	Yeoh Ghim Seng 杨锦成	PAP
Jurong	Ho Kah Leong 何家良	PAP
Kallang	Abdul Aziz Karim عبد العزيز کریم	PAP
Kampong Chai Chee	Sha'ari Tadin سهااري تادين	PAP
Kampong Glam	S. Rajaratnam எஸ். ராஜரத்தினம்	PAP
Kampong Kapor	Yeo Toon Chia 杨敦清	PAP
Kampong Kembangan	Ariff Suradi عارف سورادي	PAP
Kampong Ubi	Ya'acob Mohamed يعقوب محمد	PAP
Katong	J. F. Conceicao	PAP
Kim Keat	Ong Teng Cheong 王鼎昌	PAP
Kim Seng	Ong Leong Boon 王龙文	PAP
Kreta Ayer	Goh Keng Swee 吴庆瑞	PAP
Kuo Chuan	P. Selvadurai பி. செல்வதுரை	PAP
Leng Kee	Ahmad Mattar أحمد مطر	PAP
MacPherson	Chua Sian Chin 蔡善进	PAP
Moulmein	Lawrence Sia 谢坤祥	PAP
Mountbatten	Ng Yeow Chong 黄燿宗	PAP
Nee Soon	Ong Soo Chuan 王书泉	PAP
Pasir Panjang	Othman Wok عثمان ووك	PAP
Paya Lebar	Tay Boon Too 郑文滔	PAP
Potong Pasir	Ivan Baptist	PAP
Punggol	Ng Kah Ting 黄嘉腾	PAP
Queenstown	Jek Yeun Thong 易润堂	PAP
River Valley	Tan Eng Liang 陈英梁	PAP
Rochore	Toh Chin Chye 杜进才	PAP
Sembawang	Teong Eng Siong 张永祥	PAP
Sepoy Lines	Wee Toon Boon 黄循文 (Note: Wee Toon Boon resigned on 11 September 1976 after being convicted for corruption.)	PAP
Serangoon Gardens	L. P. Rodrigo	PAP
Siglap	Abdul Rahim Ishak عبد الرحيم إسحاق	PAP
Stamford	Fong Sip Chee 邝摄治	PAP
Tampines	Phua Bah Lee 潘峇厘	PAP
Tanglin	E. W. Barker 李光耀	PAP
Tanjong Pagar	Lee Kuan Yew 李光耀	PAP
Telok Ayer	Ong Pang Boon 王邦文	PAP
Telok Blangah	N. Govindasamy என். கோவிந்தசாமி	PAP
Thomson	Ang Nam Piau 洪南标	PAP
Tiong Bahru	Ch'ng Jit Koon 庄日昆	PAP
Toa Payoh	Eric Cheong 张润志	PAP
Ulu Pandan	Chiang Hai Ding 张泰澄	PAP
Upper Serangoon	Sia Kah Hui 谢嘉惠	PAP
Whampoa	Augustine Tan 陈惠兴	PAP
