= List of Singaporean electoral divisions (1972–1976) =

The following is a list of Singaporean electoral divisions from 1972 to 1976 that served as constituencies that elected Members of Parliament (MPs) to the 3rd Parliament of Singapore in the 1972 Singaporean general elections. The number of seats in Parliament had increased by 7 to 65 seats.

== Constituencies ==
District	Polling Districts	Total
Alexandra	AL 01 - AL 02	2
Aljunied	AJ 01 - AJ 02	2
Anson	AS 01 - AS 02	2
Boon Teck	BN 01 - BN 02	2
Bras Basah	BB 01 - BB 02	2
Bukit Batok	BK 01 - BK 06	6
Bukit Ho Swee	BH 01 - BH 02	2
Bukit Merah	BM 01 - BM 02	2
Bukit Panjang	BP 01 - BP 06	6
Bukit Timah	BT 01 - BT 04	4
Cairnhill	CA 01 - CA 05	5
Changi	CH 01 - CH 06	6
Chua Chu Kang	CK 01 - CK 06	6
Crawford	CF 01 - CF 03	3
Delta	D 01 - D 02	2
Farrer Park	FP 01 - FP 03	3
Geylang East	GE 01 - GE 03	3
Geylang Serai	GS 01 - GS 03	3
Geylang West	GW 01 - GW 02	2
Havelock	H 01 - H 03	3
Henderson	HS 01 - HS 02	2
Hong Lim	HL 01 - HL 03	3
Jalan Besar	JB 01 - JB 03	3
Jalan Kayu	JK 01 - JK 03	3
Joo Chiat	JC 01 - JC 04	4
Jurong	J 01 - J 06	6
Kallang	KL 01 - KL 04	4
Kampong Chai Chee	KC 01 - KC 03	3
Kampong Glam	KG 01 - KG 02	2
Kampong Kapor	KK 01 - KK 03	3
Kampong Kembangan	KN 01 - KN 03	3
Kampong Ubi	KU 01 - KU 03	3
Katong	KT 01 - KT 02	2
Kim Keat	KM 01 - KM 02	2
Kim Seng	KS 01 - KS 02	2
Kreta Ayer	KA 01 - KA 02	2
Kuo Chuan	KH 01 - KH 03	3
Leng Kee	LK 01 - LK 02	2
MacPherson	MP 01 - MP 02	2
Moulmein	MM 01 - MM 04	4
Mountbatten	MB 01 - MB 02	2
Nee Soon	NS 01 - NS 03	3
Pasir Panjang	PP 01 - PP 02	2
Paya Lebar	PL 01 - PL 04	4
Potong Pasir	PS 01 - PS 02	2
Punggol	PG 01 - PG 05	5
Queenstown	Q 01 - Q 02	2
River Valley	RV 01 - RV 03	3
Rochore	R 01 - R 03	3
Sembawang	SB 01 - SB 03	3
Sepoy Lines	SP 01 - SP 05	5
Serangoon Gardens	SG 01 - SG 04	4
Siglap	SL 01 - SL 03	3
Stamford	ST 01 - ST 03	3
Tampines	TM 01 - TM 05	5
Tanglin	T 01 - T 03	3
Tanjong Pagar	TP 01 - TP 02	2
Telok Ayer	TA 01 - TA 03	3
Telok Blangah	TL 01 - TL 04	4
Thomson	TH 01 - TH 03	3
Tiong Bahru	TG 01 - TG 04	4
Toa Payoh	TY 01 - TY 03	3
Ulu Pandan	UP 01 - UP 02	2
Upper Serangoon	US 01 - US 04	4
Whampoa	W 01 - W 02	2

- Alexandra
- Aljunied
- Anson
- Boon Teck
- Bras Basah
- Bukit Batok
- Bukit Ho Swee
- Bukit Merah
- Bukit Panjang
- Bukit Timah
- Cairnhill
- Changi
- Chua Chu Kang
- Crawford
- Delta
- Farrer Park
- Geylang East
- Geylang Serai
- Geylang West
- Havelock
- Henderson
- Hong Lim
- Jalan Besar
- Jalan Kayu
- Joo Chiat
- Jurong
- Kallang
- Kampong Chai Chee
- Kampong Glam
- Kampong Kapor
- Kampong Kembangan
- Kampong Ubi
- Katong
- Kim Keat
- Kim Seng
- Kreta Ayer
- Kuo Chuan
- Leng Kee
- MacPherson
- Moulmein
- Mountbatten
- Nee Soon
- Pasir Panjang
- Paya Lebar
- Potong Pasir
- Punggol
- Queenstown
- River Valley
- Rochore
- Sembawang
- Sepoy Lines
- Serangoon Gardens
- Siglap
- Stamford
- Tampines
- Tanglin
- Tanjong Pagar
- Telok Ayer
- Telok Blangah
- Thomson
- Tiong Bahru
- Toa Payoh
- Ulu Pandan
- Upper Serangoon
- Whampoa
