= Fourth Lee Kuan Yew Cabinet =

- 4th Cabinet of Singapore

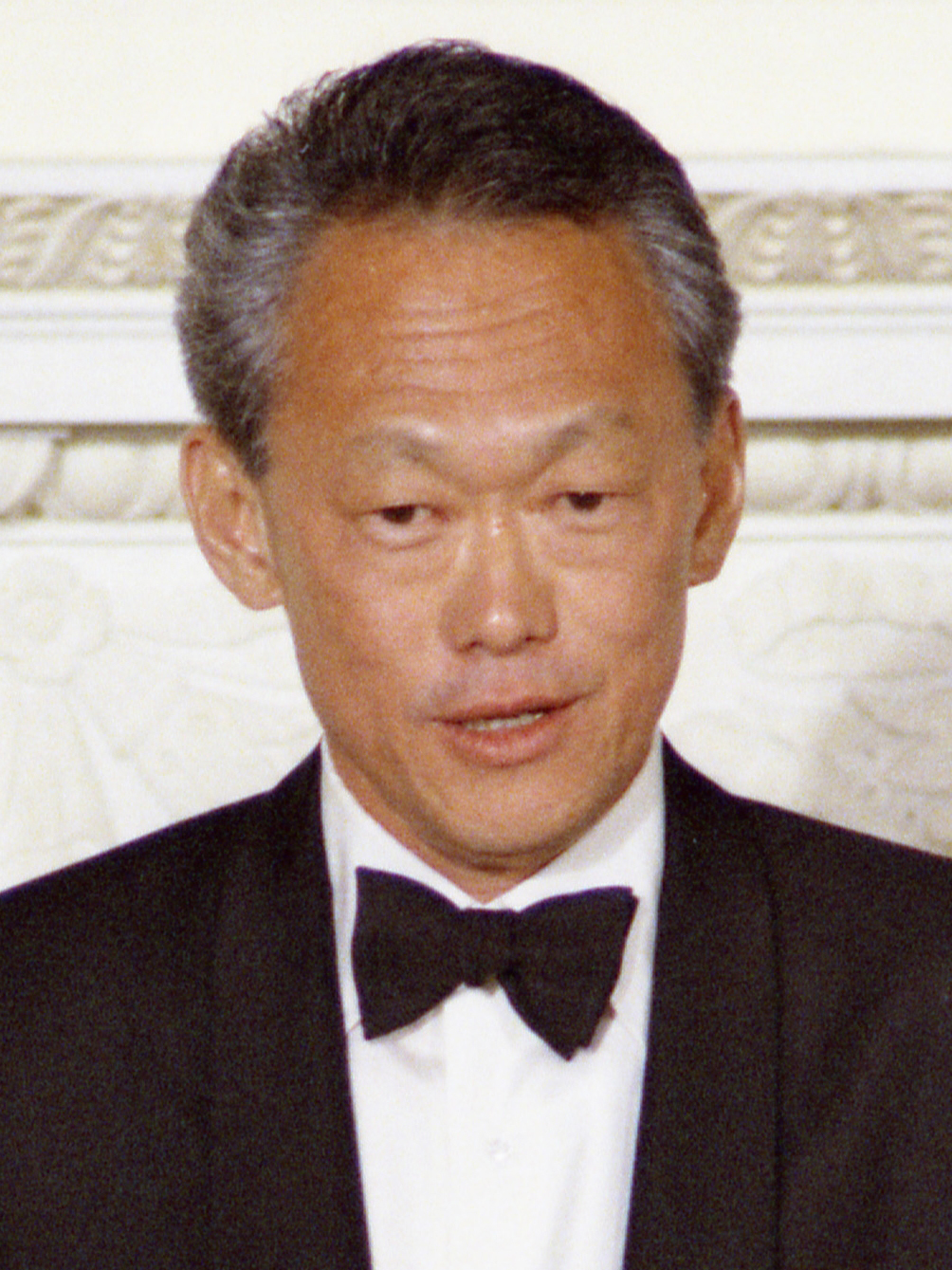
- Date formed: 16 September 1972
- Date dissolved: 30 December 1976

People and organisations
- Head of state: Benjamin Sheares
- Head of government: Lee Kuan Yew
- Deputy head of government: Goh Keng Swee (from 1 March 1973)
- Member party: People's Action Party
- Status in legislature: Supermajority

History
- Election: 1972
- Legislature term: 3rd Parliament of Singapore
- Predecessor: Third Lee Kuan Yew Cabinet
- Successor: Fifth Lee Kuan Yew Cabinet

The Fourth Lee Kuan Yew Cabinet is the fourth Cabinet of Singapore formed by Prime Minister Lee Kuan Yew. It was formed in 1972 after the 1972 Singaporean general election. The cabinet lasted from 1972 to 1976, with one shuffle in 1975.

== Cabinet ==
The Fourth Lee Kuan Yew Cabinet was composed of the following members.

Portfolio	Name	Term
Prime Minister	Lee Kuan Yew	5 June 1959 – 28 November 1990
Deputy Prime Minister	Goh Keng Swee	1 March 1973 – 31 May 1980
Minister for Science and Technology	Toh Chin Chye	16 April 1968 – 1 June 1975
Minister for Science and Technology	Lee Chiaw Meng	2 June 1975 – 30 December 1976
Minister for Defence	Goh Keng Swee	11 August 1970 – 11 February 1979
Minister for Foreign Affairs	S. Rajaratnam	12 August 1965 – 30 May 1980
Minister for Labour	Ong Pang Boon	5 July 1971 – 5 January 1981
Minister for Communications	Yong Nyuk Lin	16 April 1968 – 31 July 1975
Minister for Communications	Lim Kim San	1 August 1975 – 30 July 1978
Minister for the Environment	Lim Kim San	16 September 1972 – 1 June 1975
Minister for the Environment	E. W. Barker	2 June 1975 – 31 January 1979
Minister for Culture	Jek Yeun Thong	16 April 1968 – 25 September 1977
Minister for Social Affairs	Othman Wok	16 April 1968 – 30 June 1977
Minister for Law and National Development	E. W. Barker	9 August 1965 – 1 June 1975
Minister for Law	E. W. Barker	2 June 1975 – 12 September 1988
Minister for National Development	Lim Kim San	2 June 1975 – 31 January 1979
Minister for Home Affairs	E. W. Barker	16 September 1972 – 31 October 1972
Minister for Home Affairs	Chua Sian Chin	1 November 1972 – 1 January 1985
Minister for Health	Chua Sian Chin	16 April 1968 – 1 June 1975
Minister for Health	Toh Chin Chye	2 June 1975 – 5 January 1981
Minister for Finance	Hon Sui Sen	11 August 1970 – 14 October 1983
Minister for Education	Lee Chiaw Meng	16 September 1972 – 1 June 1975
Minister for Education	Toh Chin Chye	2 June 1975 – 14 June 1975
Minister for Education	Lee Kuan Yew	15 June 1975 – 19 October 1975
Minister for Education	Chua Sian Chin	20 October 1975 – 11 February 1979
Minister without portfolio	Yong Nyuk Lin	1 August 1975 – 31 March 1976

== List of office holders ==
The following is the list of office holders in the Fourth Lee Kuan Yew Cabinet. Cabinet members are listed in bold.

Prime Minister's Office
Office	Name	Term start	Term end
Prime Minister	**Lee Kuan Yew**	16 September 1972	30 December 1976
Deputy Prime Minister	**Goh Keng Swee**	1 March 1973	30 December 1976
Minister without portfolio	**Yong Nyuk Lin**	1 August 1975	31 March 1976
Minister of State for the Prime Minister's Office	Ya'acob Mohamed	16 September 1972	30 December 1976
Ministry of Communications
Office	Name	Term start	Term end
Minister for Communications	**Yong Nyuk Lin**	16 September 1972	31 July 1975
Minister for Communications	**Lim Kim San**	1 August 1975	30 December 1976
Senior Minister of State for Communications	Ong Teng Cheong	2 June 1975	30 December 1976
Minister of State for Communications	Ang Kok Peng	16 September 1972	28 April 1974
Minister of State for Communications	Chai Chong Yii	29 April 1974	1 June 1975
Parliamentary Secretary for Communications	Lim Guan Hoo	16 September 1972	15 July 1973
Ministry of Culture
Office	Name	Term start	Term end
Minister for Culture	**Jek Yeun Thong**	16 September 1972	30 December 1976
Senior Parliamentary Secretary for Culture	Sha'ari Tadin	16 September 1972	30 December 1976
Ministry of Defence
Office	Name	Term start	Term end
Minister for Defence	**Goh Keng Swee**	16 September 1972	30 December 1976
Senior Parliamentary Secretary for Defence	Phua Bah Lee	16 September 1972	30 December 1976
Ministry of Education
Office	Name	Term start	Term end
Minister for Education	**Lee Chiaw Meng**	16 September 1972	1 June 1975
Minister for Education	**Toh Chin Chye**	2 June 1975	14 June 1975
Minister for Education	**Lee Kuan Yew**	15 June 1975	19 October 1975
Minister for Education	**Chua Sian Chin**	20 October 1975	30 December 1976
Senior Minister of State for Education	Chai Chong Yii	2 June 1975	30 December 1976
Minister of State for Education	Chai Chong Yii	16 September 1972	28 April 1974
Parliamentary Secretary for Education	Ahmad Mattar	16 September 1972	30 December 1976
Ministry of the Environment
Office	Name	Term start	Term end
Minister for the Environment	**Lim Kim San**	16 September 1972	1 June 1975
Minister for the Environment	**E. W. Barker**	2 June 1975	30 December 1976
Senior Parliamentary Secretary for the Environment	Chor Yeok Eng	16 September 1972	30 December 1976
Ministry of Finance
Office	Name	Term start	Term end
Minister for Finance	**Hon Sui Sen**	16 September 1972	30 December 1976
Ministry of Foreign Affairs
Office	Name	Term start	Term end
Minister for Foreign Affairs	**S. Rajaratnam**	16 September 1972	30 December 1976
Senior Minister of State for Foreign Affairs	Abdul Rahim Ishak	16 September 1972	30 December 1976
Senior Minister of State for Foreign Affairs	Lee Khoon Choy	16 September 1972	30 December 1976
Parliamentary Secretary for Foreign Affairs	Ong Soo Chuan	16 September 1972	30 December 1976
Ministry of Health
Office	Name	Term start	Term end
Minister for Health	**Chua Sian Chin**	16 September 1972	1 June 1975
Minister for Health	**Toh Chin Chye**	2 June 1975	30 December 1976
Minister of State for Health	Ang Kok Peng	29 April 1974	30 December 1976
Ministry of Home Affairs
Office	Name	Term start	Term end
Minister for Home Affairs	**E. W. Barker**	16 September 1972	31 October 1972
Minister for Home Affairs	**Chua Sian Chin**	1 November 1972	30 December 1976
Parliamentary Secretary for Home Affairs	Lim Guan Hoo	16 July 1973	30 December 1976
Ministry of Labour
Office	Name	Term start	Term end
Minister for Labour	**Ong Pang Boon**	16 September 1972	30 December 1976
Minister of State for Labour	Sia Kah Hui	16 September 1972	30 December 1976
Senior Parliamentary Secretary for Labour	Fong Sip Chee	16 September 1972	30 December 1976
Ministry of Law and National Development (until 1 June 1975)
Office	Name	Term start	Term end
Minister for Law and National Development	**E. W. Barker**	16 September 1972	1 June 1975
Parliamentary Secretary for National Development	Ho Cheng Choon	16 September 1972	1 June 1975
Ministry of Law (from 2 June 1975)
Office	Name	Term start	Term end
Minister for Law	**E. W. Barker**	2 June 1975	30 December 1976
Ministry of National Development (from 2 June 1975)
Office	Name	Term start	Term end
Minister for National Development	**Lim Kim San**	2 June 1975	30 December 1976
Senior Minister of State for National Development	Tan Eng Liang	2 June 1975	30 December 1976
Parliamentary Secretary for National Development	Ho Cheng Choon	2 June 1975	30 December 1976
Ministry of Science and Technology
Office	Name	Term start	Term end
Minister for Science and Technology	**Toh Chin Chye**	16 September 1972	1 June 1975
Minister for Science and Technology	**Lee Chiaw Meng**	2 June 1975	30 December 1976
Ministry of Social Affairs
Office	Name	Term start	Term end
Minister for Social Affairs	**Othman Wok**	16 September 1972	30 December 1976
Senior Parliamentary Secretary for Social Affairs	Chan Chee Seng	16 September 1972	30 December 1976
