= 1972 Singaporean general election =

- 2 September 1972

All 65 seats in Parliament 33 seats needed for a majority
- Registered: 908,382 (Note: 95,456 of the 908,382 voters were registered in uncontested constituencies, leaving 812,926 voters able to vote.)
- Turnout: 93.55% (▲1.72pp)
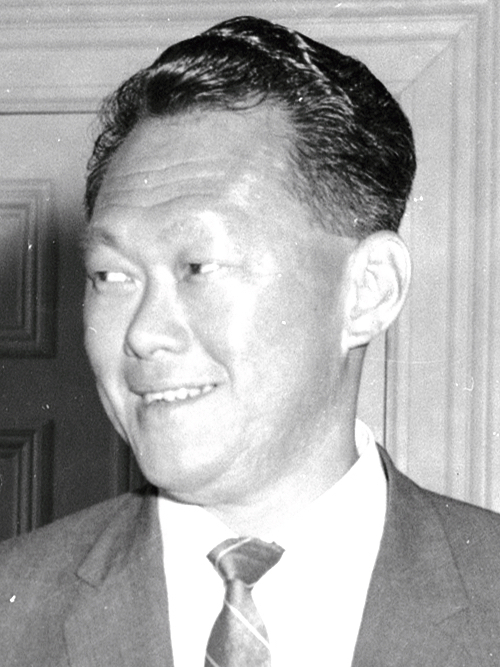
	First party
Leader	Lee Kuan Yew
Party	PAP
Leader's seat	Tanjong Pagar
Last election	86.72%, 58 seats
Seats won	65
Seat change	▲7
Popular vote	524,892
Percentage	70.43%
Swing	▼16.29pp
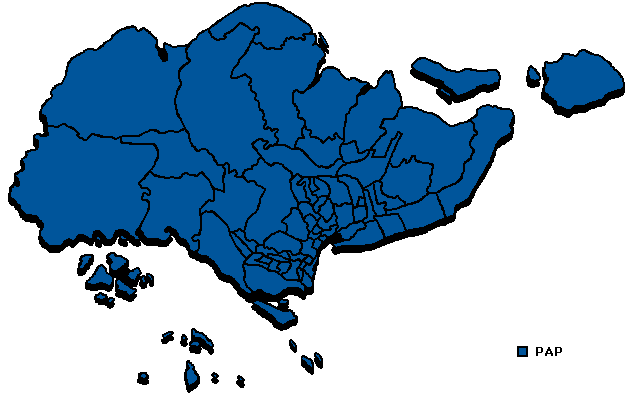
- Results by constituency
Prime Minister before election
Lee Kuan Yew
PAP
Prime Minister after election
Lee Kuan Yew
PAP

General elections were held in Singapore on 2 September 1972 to elect all 65 members of Parliament. They were the fourth general elections since Singapore attained self-governance in 1959 and the second since gaining independence in 1965.

A total of 137 candidates contested in this election: the PAP, led by Prime Minister Lee Kuan Yew, won all 65 seats in Parliament in a landslide victory for the third consecutive general election. The PAP received 524,892 of the 745,239 valid votes cast, amounting to 70.43% of the popular vote. This represented a decline from the 86.72% share it achieved in the 1968 general elections. The opposition parties, including the Barisan Sosialis (BS), Workers' Party (WP), United National Front (UNF), People's Front (PF) and Pertubuhan Kebangsaan Melayu Singapura (PKMS), collectively contested the elections but failed to win any seats. BS, which had boycotted the vote in 1968, returned to the electoral arena, fielding 10 candidates; these only secured a combined 4.63% of the popular vote, and have remained fragmented as most of the candidates candidates lost their election deposits due to low vote shares. The results left Parliament without any opposition members, reinforcing the PAP's legislative dominance. With no change in party representation, this election continued the trend of one-party rule that had been in place since 1968.

The election saw the most number of candidates forfeiting their deposits since post-independence, with 22, and the fewest number of seats being won via walkovers, with only eight. These respective numbers have since been surpassed in 2011 where only five seats were uncontested; 2025 later tied 2011's count of uncontested walkovers (not counting elections with zero walkovers), and had also surpassed the count of number of candidates losing their deposits, with 27.

== Electoral system ==
The 65 members of Parliament were elected in 65 single-member constituencies, an increase from 58 in the 1968 elections. Like the previous elections, boundaries and constituencies were adjusted due to changes in development or population; the newly added constituencies were:

Constituency	Changes
New Constituencies
Boon Teck; Kim Keat; Kuo Chuan	Carved from Toa Payoh
Bukit Batok	Carved from Bukit Panjang, Bukit Timah and Choa Chu Kang
Henderson	Carved from Tiong Bahru
Kim Seng	Carved from Bukit Ho Swee and Delta
Leng Kee	Carved from Bukit Merah

== Timeline ==
Date	Event
16 August	Dissolution of 2nd Parliament
23 August	Nomination Day
2 September	Polling Day
12 October	Opening of 3rd Parliament

== MPs not standing for re-election ==
Four MPs announced their retirement this election, though Low Yong Nguan would later return to politics in 1988 standing under the future Singapore Democratic Party's banner.

MP	Party	Constituency	Elected in
Mohamad Ghazali Ismail	PAP	Aljunied	1968
Low Guan Onn	PAP	River Valley	1968
Low Yong Nguan	PAP	Crawford	1968
S. Ramaswamy	PAP	Potong Pasir	1966

== New candidates ==
The PAP had 11 new candidates, which include architect Ong Teng Cheong, a future Deputy Prime Minister and also the first-elected and fifth President of Singapore, and university lecturer Ahmad Mattar, a future cabinet minister who would later become the first Minister-in-charge of Muslim Affairs. J. B. Jeyaretnam, the Workers' Party's secretary-general, also marked its electoral debut this election.

New candidate	Party	Constituency
A. Rahim	BS	Delta
Ahmad Mattar	PAP	Leng Kee
Amir Ali Mohamed	UNF	Aljunied
Ang Kheng Kwan	UNF	Ulu Pandan
Ang Kok Peng	PAP	Crawford
Ariffin Noordin	WP	Siglap
Ivan Baptist	PAP	Potong Pasir
Chai Chong Yii	PAP	Bukit Batok
Cheng Poh Yew	WP	Moulmein
Chin Harn Tong	PAP	Aljunied
Chin Tian Choo	BS	Bukit Ho Swee
Chua Eng Huat	WP	Queenstown
William Cook	UNF	Joo Chiat
Paul Elisha	UNF	Cairnhill
S. A. Hamid	UNF	Alexandra
Harnek Singh	UNF	Potong Pasir
Hashim Yadi	WP	Kampong Chai Chee
Heng Swee Tong	WP	Kim Seng
Ho Soo Hock	UNF	Sepoy Lines
J. B. Jeyaretnam	WP	Farrer Park
Kamaruddin Hassan	UNF	Kampong Kembangan
Kho Jiak Hiong	WP	Bukit Merah
C. Kunjuraman	UNF	Anson
Lai Tha Chai	PAP	Henderson
S. A. Latiff	UNF	Farrer Park
Lee Kah Chit	UNF	Tiong Bahru
Lee Tow Kiat	WP	MacPherson
Lee Yiok Seng	PAP	Bukit Panjang
Leong Mun Kwai	PF	Tanjong Pagar
Lew Ban Huat	UNF	Queenstown
Leyu Tan Jib	UNF	Bukit Panjang
Lim Kia Joo	UNF	Upper Serangoon
Lim Kang Chew	WP	Aljunied
Lim Thiam Hock	PF	Boon Teck
N. Logam	UNF	Leng Kee
P. Mano	BS	Kuo Chuan
Mohd Arif	UNF	Sembawang
Mohd Elias Ibrahim	UNF	Geylang East
Rajaratnam Murugason	WP	Potong Pasir
N. M. Abdul Wahid	UNF	Crawford
K. K. Nair	BS	Bukit Timah
Ng Ah Chue	BS	Chua Chu Kang
Johnnie Ng	UNF	Jalan Besar
Ng Oh Chew	UNF	Telok Ayer
Ng Soon Hee	UNF	Jurong
Ng Yang Choo	BS	Kampong Chai Chee
Normah Yahya	WP	Changi
Omar Ninggal	UNF	Changi
Ong Leong Boon	PAP	Kim Seng
Ong Seng Kok	UNF	Jalan Kayu
Ong Teng Cheong	PAP	Kim Keat
Othman Abdullah	WP	Kampong Kembangan
W. J. Paglar	UNF	Kim Keat
Phang Juet Haw	PF	Whampoa
Phey Yew Kok	PAP	Boon Teck
Quek Doh Lam	WP	Geylang West
Rahman Zin	PKMS	Kampong Ubi
M. Ramasamy	UNF	Telok Blangah
Rom Jaafar	UNF	Geylang Serai
Said Jali	BS	Bukit Merah
Seow Khee Leng	WP	Kim Keat
Seow Yong Chew	WP	Tiong Bahru
Sultan Mydin Abdul Hamid	UNF	Kallang
Tan Eng Liang	PAP	River Valley
Tan Poh Seng	WP	Paya Lebar
Tan Sim Hock	PF	Tampines
Tang Song Khiang	WP	Bukit Panjang
Tay Kim Oh	WP	Anson
Wong Kong Hoa	PF	Hong Lim
Wong Wen Nam	PF	Henderson
Wu Kher	WP	Crawford
Yap Fatt Shing	UNF	Nee Soon
Zainul Abiddin Mohd Shah	WP	Telok Blangah

== Campaign ==
Unlike in 1968 where the People's Action Party (PAP) secured a return to power on nomination day due to only seven out of 58 seats being contested, the 1972 election saw increased electoral participation, with contests taking place in all but eight constituencies.

=== Political parties ===
The ruling PAP sought to reinforce its position by portraying opposition parties as "lacking credibility and coherence". The PAP criticised opposition groups for what it described as inconsistent and opportunistic political manoeuvres, which, in their view, diminished public confidence in these parties. Emphasising Singapore's rapid economic development, including successful public housing projects and increasing standards of living, the PAP argued that such progress demonstrated the effectiveness of its governance model. The party further suggested that political diversity risked causing internal divisions and "squabbling" that could undermine national unity and impede policy implementation during a critical period of nation-building.

Barisan Sosialis (BS) renounced its boycott strategy and attempted to make a comeback, while the Workers' Party (WP) saw its rejuvenation with the introduction of its new secretary-general, also lawyer and former district judge, J. B. Jeyaretnam, who would later become the inaugural opposition Member of Parliament in 1981; former leader and ex-Chief Minister David Marshall contemplated standing as an independent, but ultimately did not run due to a stingray wound.

Other opposition parties included the United National Front (UNF), the People's Front (PF) and the Pertubuhan Kebangsaan Melayu Singapura (PKMS). Attempts to form a unified electoral pact among the opposition were unsuccessful, leading to a fragmented opposition that split the anti-PAP vote across constituencies. As a result, a significant number of opposition candidates lost their election deposits. Opposition leaders also criticised what they viewed as the dominance of the PAP in political institutions, limited media access and restrictions on political expression, which they argued hindered the development of a viable multi-party system and constrained voters' political choices.

== Results ==
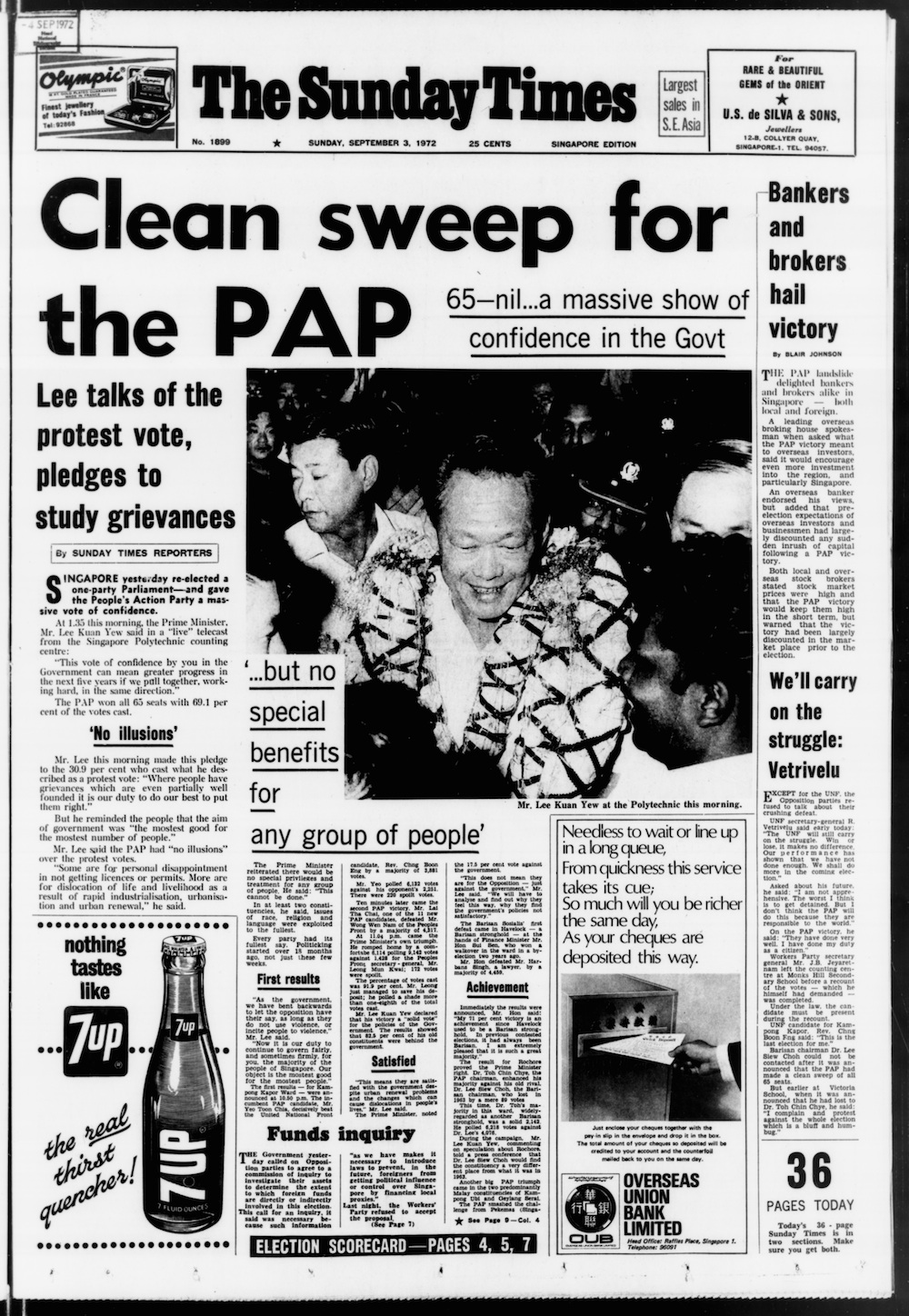
The front page on page 1 of The Straits Times on 3 September

With expectations that the PAP might face stiffer competition, Prime Minister Lee Kuan Yew stated that securing around 45 seats would already constitute a convincing mandate. Nevertheless, the PAP succeeded in winning all 65 seats in Parliament, marking the second consecutive election in which it achieved a clean sweep. The outcome reinforced the party's political dominance in the post-independence era, despite a more contested electoral landscape compared to 1968.

The election also recorded a notable number of forfeited deposits, with 22 opposition candidates receiving less than 12.5% of the valid votes cast in their respective constituencies, resulting in the loss of their $500 election deposits, a record at the time in post-independence Singapore. Lee was overwhelmingly reelected to his constituency of Tanjong Pagar with 84.08% of the vote, the highest share recorded by any candidate for the second consecutive election.

Popular vote
1. PAP (70.4%)
2. WP (12.2%)
3. UNF (7.38%)
4. BS (4.63%)
5. PF (3.01%)
6. Others (2.35%)
Seats won
1. 8 seats (PAP; uncontested) (12.3%)
2. 57 seats (PAP; contested) (87.7%)

Party	Votes	%	+/–	Seats	+/–
People's Action Party	524,892	70.43	–16.29	65	+7
Workers' Party	90,885	12.20	+8.18	0	0
United National Front	55,001	7.38	New	0	New
Barisan Sosialis	34,483	4.63	New	0	New
People's Front	22,462	3.01	New	0	New
Pertubuhan Kebangsaan Melayu Singapura	10,054	1.35	New	0	New
Independents	7,462	1.00	–8.27	0	0
Total	745,239	100.00	–	65	+7
Valid votes	745,239	98.00			
Invalid/blank votes	15,229	2.00			
Total votes	760,468	100.00			
Registered voters/turnout	908,382	93.55			
Source: Nohlen et al., Singapore Elections

Opposition parties contested vote
Party	Votes
PKMS	37.73%
PF	27.54%
BS	27.05%
WP	24.46%
Independents	23.24%
UNF	12.29%

=== By constituency ===
Constituency	Electorate	Party	Candidates	Votes	%	Swing	Margin
Alexandra	24,499	People's Action Party	Wong Lin Ken	17,965	77.52	N/A	61.20
Alexandra	24,499	Workers' Party	Wong Kui Yu	3,782	16.32	New	61.20
Alexandra	24,499	United National Front	S.A. Hamid	1,427	6.16	New	61.20
Aljunied	19,278	People's Action Party	Chin Harn Tong	12,861	71.51	N/A	57.26
Aljunied	19,278	Workers' Party	Lim Kang Chew	4,360	24.25	New	57.26
Aljunied	19,278	United National Front	Amir Ali Mohamed	762	4.24	New	57.26
Anson	8,171	People's Action Party	P. Govindaswamy	5,027	74.34	N/A	55.25
Anson	8,171	Workers' Party	Tay Kim Oh	1,291	19.09	New	55.25
Anson	8,171	United National Front	C. Kunjuraman	444	6.57	New	55.25
Boon Teck	15,958	People's Action Party	Phey Yew Kok	9,947	66.75	New	33.50
Boon Teck	15,958	People's Front	Lim Thiam Hock	4,954	33.25	New	33.50
Bras Basah	8,323	People's Action Party	Ho See Beng	Uncontested			
Bukit Batok	14,563	People's Action Party	Chai Chong Yii	9,765	73.78	New	47.56
Bukit Batok	14,563	United National Front	R. Vetrivelu	3,471	26.22	New	47.56
Bukit Ho Swee	12,212	People's Action Party	Seah Mui Kok	7,862	68.77	N/A	49.45
Bukit Ho Swee	12,212	Barisan Sosialis	Chin Tian Choo	2,209	19.32	New	49.45
Bukit Ho Swee	12,212	Workers' Party	Wee Kia Eng	1,361	11.91	New	49.45
Bukit Merah	13,960	People's Action Party	Lim Guan Hoo	9,044	69.33	N/A	53.68
Bukit Merah	13,960	Workers' Party	Kho Jiak Hiong	2,042	15.65	New	53.68
Bukit Merah	13,960	Barisan Sosialis	Said Jali	1,958	15.02	New	53.68
Bukit Panjang	15,461	People's Action Party	Lee Yiok Seng	9,527	67.65	N/A	42.83
Bukit Panjang	15,461	Workers' Party	Tang Song Khiang	3,496	24.82	New	42.83
Bukit Panjang	15,461	United National Front	Leyu Tan Jib	1,060	7.53	New	42.83
Bukit Timah	15,476	People's Action Party	Chor Yeok Eng	9,475	66.78	N/A	33.56
Bukit Timah	15,476	Barisan Sosialis	K. K. Nair	4,714	33.22	New	33.56
Cairnhill	11,952	People's Action Party	Lim Kim San	8,458	80.92	N/A	61.84
Cairnhill	11,952	United National Front	Paul Elisha	1,994	19.08	New	61.84
Changi	18,297	People's Action Party	Sim Boon Woo	10,512	62.42	N/A	33.22
Changi	18,297	Workers' Party	Normah Yahya	4,917	29.20	New	33.22
Changi	18,297	United National Front	Omar Ninggal	1,412	8.38	New	33.22
Chua Chu Kang	15,669	People's Action Party	Tang See Chim	9,002	62.36	N/A	24.72
Chua Chu Kang	15,669	Barisan Sosialis	Ng Ah Chue	5,434	37.64	New	24.72
Crawford	9,285	People's Action Party	Ang Kok Peng	6,040	72.60	N/A	53.79
Crawford	9,285	Workers' Party	Wu Kher	1,565	18.81	New	53.79
Crawford	9,285	United National Front	N. M. Abdul Wahid	714	8.59	New	53.79
Delta	13,781	People's Action Party	Yeo Choo Kok	9,149	70.72	N/A	53.82
Delta	13,781	Workers' Party	Wong Hong Toy	2,186	16.90	New	53.82
Delta	13,781	Barisan Sosialis	A. Rahim	1,602	12.38	New	53.82
Farrer Park	12,707	People's Action Party	Lee Chiaw Meng	8,521	73.82	▼11.09	50.71
Farrer Park	12,707	Workers' Party	J. B. Jeyaretnam	2,668	23.11	New	50.71
Farrer Park	12,707	United National Front	S. A. Latiff	354	3.07	New	50.71
Geylang East	16,580	People's Action Party	Ho Cheng Choon	9,692	64.24	N/A	31.43
Geylang East	16,580	Workers' Party	Kum Teng Hock	4,951	32.81	New	31.43
Geylang East	16,580	United National Front	Mohd Elias Ibrahim	445	2.95	New	31.43
Geylang Serai	13,837	People's Action Party	Rahmat Kenap	6,711	53.59	▼29.42	13.84
Geylang Serai	13,837	Pertubuhan Kebangsaan Melayu Singapura	Ahmad Haji Taff	4,978	39.75	New	13.84
Geylang Serai	13,837	United National Front	Rom Jaafar	833	6.66	New	13.84
Geylang West	11,653	People's Action Party	Yong Nyuk Lin	7,320	69.28	N/A	38.56
Geylang West	11,653	Workers' Party	Quek Doh Lam	3,246	30.72	New	38.56
Havelock	10,849	People's Action Party	Hon Sui Sen	7,151	72.65	N/A	45.30
Havelock	10,849	Barisan Sosialis	Harbans Singh	2,692	27.35	New	45.30
Henderson	9,431	People's Action Party	Lai Tha Chai	6,577	74.43	New	48.86
Henderson	9,431	People's Front	Wong Wen Nan	2,260	25.57	New	48.86
Hong Lim	7,486	People's Action Party	Lee Khoon Choy	4,835	73.79	N/A	47.58
Hong Lim	7,486	People's Front	Wong Kong Hoa	1,717	26.21	New	47.58
Jalan Besar	10,310	People's Action Party	Chan Chee Seng	7,794	83.86	N/A	67.72
Jalan Besar	10,310	United National Front	Johnnie Ng	1,500	16.14	New	67.72
Jalan Kayu	14,982	People's Action Party	Hwang Soo Jin	8,283	59.42	▼22.88	22.56
Jalan Kayu	14,982	Workers' Party	M. P. D. Nair	5,137	36.86	▲19.16	22.56
Jalan Kayu	14,982	United National Front	Ong Seng Kok	518	3.72	New	22.56
Joo Chiat	15,684	People's Action Party	Yeoh Ghim Seng	11,669	83.49	N/A	66.98
Joo Chiat	15,684	United National Front	William Cook	2,307	16.51	New	66.98
Jurong	15,348	People's Action Party	Ho Kah Leong	10,741	76.43	N/A	52.86
Jurong	15,348	United National Front	Ng Soon Hee	3,312	23.57	New	52.86
Kallang	17,232	People's Action Party	Abdul Aziz Karim	12,626	79.75	N/A	59.50
Kallang	17,232	United National Front	Sultan Mydin Abdul Hamid	3,205	20.25	New	59.50
Kampong Chai Chee	15,564	People's Action Party	Sha'ari Tadin	7,458	52.39	N/A	22.97
Kampong Chai Chee	15,564	Barisan Sosialis	Ng Yang Choo	4,188	29.42	New	22.97
Kampong Chai Chee	15,564	Workers' Party	Hashim Yadi	2,590	18.19	New	22.97
Kampong Glam	7,542	People's Action Party	S. Rajaratnam	Uncontested			
Kampong Kapor	9,361	People's Action Party	Yeo Toon Chia	6,132	73.15	N/A	46.30
Kampong Kapor	9,361	United National Front	Chng Boon Eng	2,251	26.85	New	46.30
Kampong Kembangan	18,480	People's Action Party	Ariff Suradi	9,671	57.53	N/A	25.10
Kampong Kembangan	18,480	Workers' Party	Othman Abdullah	5,451	32.43	New	25.10
Kampong Kembangan	18,480	United National Front	Kamaruddin Hassan	1,687	10.04	New	25.10
Kampong Ubi	15,431	People's Action Party	Ya'acob Mohamed	8,030	56.86	▼25.01	20.90
Kampong Ubi	15,431	Pertubuhan Kebangsaan Melayu Singapura	Rahman Zin	5,076	35.94	New	20.90
Kampong Ubi	15,431	United National Front	Darus Shariff	1,017	7.20	New	20.90
Katong	16,766	People's Action Party	Joseph Francis Conceicao	Uncontested			
Kim Keat	14,640	People's Action Party	Ong Teng Cheong	10,262	74.00	N/A	52.21
Kim Keat	14,640	Workers' Party	Seow Khee Leng	3,022	21.79	New	52.21
Kim Keat	14,640	United National Front	W. J. Paglar	583	4.21	New	52.21
Kim Seng	12,893	People's Action Party	Ong Leong Boon	8,178	67.74	N/A	35.48
Kim Seng	12,893	Workers' Party	Heng Swee Tong	3,895	32.26	New	35.48
Kreta Ayer	9,627	People's Action Party	Goh Keng Swee	Uncontested			35.48
Kuo Chuan	15,142	People's Action Party	P. Selvadurai	10,523	73.69	N/A	47.38
Kuo Chuan	15,142	Barisan Sosialis	P. Mano	3,757	26.31	New	47.38
Leng Kee	17,158	People's Action Party	Ahmad Mattar	10,929	68.28	N/A	43.07
Leng Kee	17,158	Workers' Party	Ng Ho	4,036	25.21	New	43.07
Leng Kee	17,158	United National Front	N. Logam	1,042	6.51	New	43.07
MacPherson	15,637	People's Action Party	Chua Sian Chin	10,117	68.76	N/A	37.52
MacPherson	15,637	Workers' Party	Lee Tow Kiat	4,597	31.24	New	37.52
Moulmein	11,144	People's Action Party	Lawrence Sia	7,412	72.43	▼18.13	44.86
Moulmein	11,144	Workers' Party	Cheng Poh Yew	2,822	27.57	New	44.86
Mountbatten	14,396	People's Action Party	Ng Yeow Chong	Uncontested			
Nee Soon	17,061	People's Action Party	Ong Soo Chuan	11,636	73.29	▼18.06	47.58
Nee Soon	17,061	United National Front	F. S. Yap	4,240	26.71	New	47.58
Pasir Panjang	13,964	People's Action Party	Othman Wok	9,209	71.77	N/A	43.54
Pasir Panjang	13,964	United National Front	Syed Ahmad Syed Husain	3,623	28.23	New	43.54
Paya Lebar	19,102	People's Action Party	Tay Boon Too	11,073	61.59	N/A	31.77
Paya Lebar	19,102	Workers' Party	Tan Poh Seng	5,361	29.82	New	31.77
Paya Lebar	19,102	Independent	Kow Kee Seng	1,545	8.59	New	31.77
Potong Pasir	13,103	People's Action Party	Ivan Baptist	7,772	66.22	N/A	37.33
Potong Pasir	13,103	Workers' Party	Rajaratnam Murugason	3,391	28.89	New	37.33
Potong Pasir	13,103	United National Front	Harnek Singh	573	4.89	New	37.33
Punggol	15,303	People's Action Party	Ng Kah Ting	8,215	58.13	N/A	16.26
Punggol	15,303	Independent	Ng Teng Kian	5,917	41.87	New	16.26
Queenstown	18,458	People's Action Party	Jek Yeun Thong	14,200	81.24	N/A	52.35
Queenstown	18,458	Workers' Party	Chua Eng Huat	2,504	28.89	New	52.35
Queenstown	18,458	United National Front	Lew Ban Huat	775	4.43	New	52.35
River Valley	12,189	People's Action Party	Tan Eng Liang	Uncontested			
Rochore	11,589	People's Action Party	Toh Chin Chye	6,218	60.40	N/A	20.80
Rochore	11,589	Barisan Sosialis	Lee Siew Choh	4,076	39.60	New	20.80
Sembawang	12,217	People's Action Party	Teong Eng Siong	8,466	77.36	N/A	54.70
Sembawang	12,217	United National Front	Mohd Arif	2,478	22.64	New	54.70
Sepoy Lines	12,308	People's Action Party	Wee Toon Boon	9,160	81.30	N/A	62.60
Sepoy Lines	12,308	United National Front	Ho Soo Hock	2,107	18.70	New	62.60
Serangoon Gardens	13,836	People's Action Party	L. P. Rodrigo	Uncontested			
Siglap	16,091	People's Action Party	Abdul Rahim Ishak	11,456	78.63	N/A	61.27
Siglap	16,091	Workers' Party	Ariffin Noordin	2,529	17.36	New	61.27
Siglap	16,091	United National Front	H. M. Yahiya	584	4.01	New	61.27
Stamford	8,212	People's Action Party	Fong Sip Chee	5,083	71.77	N/A	43.54
Stamford	8,212	Workers' Party	Chiang Seok Keong	1,999	28.23	New	43.54
Tampines	15,302	People's Action Party	Phua Bah Lee	9,049	64.30	N/A	28.60
Tampines	15,302	People's Front	Tan Sim Hock	5,025	35.70	New	28.60
Tanglin	12,777	People's Action Party	E. W. Barker	Uncontested			
Tanjong Pagar	9,946	People's Action Party	Lee Kuan Yew	7,542	84.08	▼10.26	68.16
Tanjong Pagar	9,946	People's Front	Leong Mun Kwai	1,428	15.92	New	68.16
Telok Ayer	10,547	People's Action Party	Ong Pang Boon	7,612	83.98	N/A	67.96
Telok Ayer	10,547	United National Front	Ng Oh Chew	1,452	16.02	New	67.96
Telok Blangah	14,624	People's Action Party	N. Govindasamy	7,669	57.92	N/A	22.32
Telok Blangah	14,624	Workers' Party	Zainul Abiddin Mohd Shah	4,714	35.60	New	22.32
Telok Blangah	14,624	United National Front	M. Ramasamy	858	6.48	New	22.32
Thomson	18,702	People's Action Party	Ang Nam Piau	12,378	72.55	N/A	45.10
Thomson	18,702	People's Front	Wong Chung Kit	4,683	27.45	New	45.10
Tiong Bahru	17,394	People's Action Party	Ch'ng Jit Koon	11,991	75.62	N/A	56.88
Tiong Bahru	17,394	Workers' Party	Seow Yong Chew	2,972	18.74	New	56.88
Tiong Bahru	17,394	United National Front	Lee Kah Chit	894	5.64	New	56.88
Toa Payoh	15,742	People's Action Party	Eric Cheong	10,884	73.85	N/A	47.70
Toa Payoh	15,742	Barisan Sosialis	Tay Cheng Kang	3,853	26.15	New	47.70
Ulu Pandan	14,485	People's Action Party	Chiang Hai Ding	9,378	71.83	N/A	43.66
Ulu Pandan	14,485	United National Front	Ang Kheng Kwan	3,678	28.17	New	43.66
Upper Serangoon	16,621	People's Action Party	Sia Kah Hui	11,862	77.72		55.44
Upper Serangoon	16,621	United National Front	Lim Kia Joo	3,401	22.28	New	55.44
Whampoa	12,044	People's Action Party	Augustine Tan	8,773	78.55		57.10
Whampoa	12,044	People's Front	Phang Juet Haw	2,395	21.45	New	57.10
Source: ELD, Singapore Elections
