= Fifth Lee Kuan Yew Cabinet =

- 5th Cabinet of Singapore

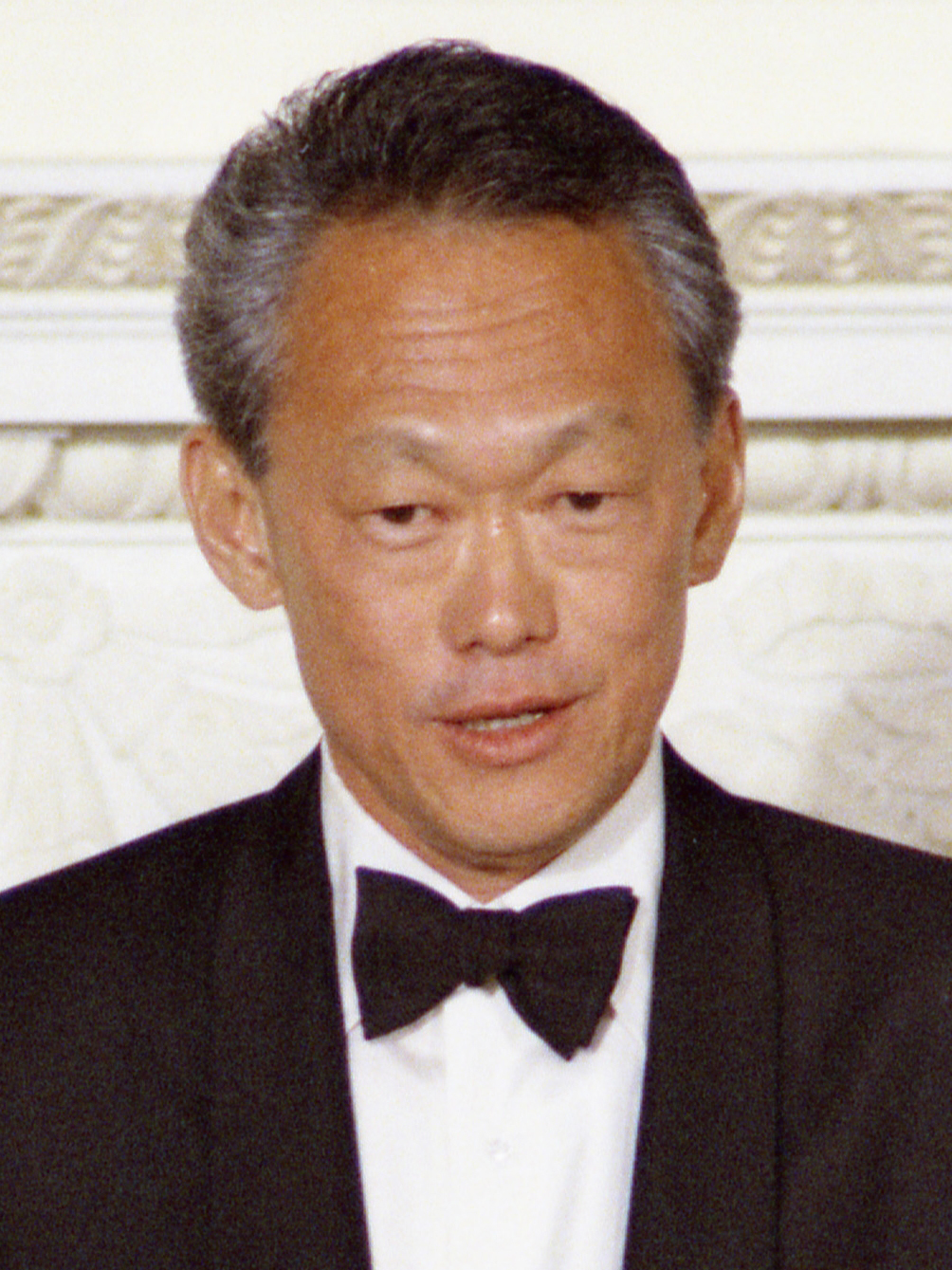
- Date formed: 31 December 1976
- Date dissolved: 5 January 1981

People and organisations
- Head of state: Benjamin Sheares
- Head of government: Lee Kuan Yew
- Deputy head of government: Goh Keng Swee; S. Rajaratnam (from 1 June 1980)
- Member party: People's Action Party
- Status in legislature: Supermajority

History
- Election: 1976
- Legislature term: 4th Parliament of Singapore
- Predecessor: Fourth Lee Kuan Yew Cabinet
- Successor: Sixth Lee Kuan Yew Cabinet

The Fifth Lee Kuan Yew Cabinet is the fifth Cabinet of Singapore formed by Prime Minister Lee Kuan Yew. It was formed in 1976 after the 1976 Singaporean general election.

== Cabinet ==
The Fifth Lee Kuan Yew Cabinet was composed of the following members.

Portfolio	Name	Term
Prime Minister	Lee Kuan Yew	5 June 1959 – 28 November 1990
Deputy Prime Minister	Goh Keng Swee	1 March 1973 – 31 May 1980
First Deputy Prime Minister	Goh Keng Swee	1 June 1980 – 1 January 1985
Second Deputy Prime Minister (Foreign Affairs)	S. Rajaratnam	1 June 1980 – 1 January 1985
Minister for Defence	Goh Keng Swee	11 August 1970 – 11 February 1979
Minister for Defence	Howe Yoon Chong	12 February 1979 – 31 May 1982
Minister for Health	Toh Chin Chye	2 June 1975 – 5 January 1981
Minister for Foreign Affairs	S. Rajaratnam	12 August 1965 – 30 May 1980
Minister for Foreign Affairs	S. Dhanabalan	1 June 1980 – 12 September 1988
Minister for Labour	Ong Pang Boon	5 July 1971 – 5 January 1981
Minister for National Development	Lim Kim San	2 June 1975 – 31 January 1979
Minister for National Development	Teh Cheang Wan	1 February 1979 – 14 December 1986
Minister for Communications	Lim Kim San	1 August 1975 – 30 July 1978
Minister for Communications	Ong Teng Cheong	1 July 1978 – 8 May 1983
Minister for Culture	Jek Yeun Thong	16 April 1968 – 25 September 1977
Minister for Culture	Ong Teng Cheong	26 September 1977 – 5 January 1981 (acting)
Minister for Science and Technology	Jek Yeun Thong	31 December 1976 – 25 September 1977
Minister for Science and Technology	E. W. Barker	26 September 1977 – 1 April 1981
Minister for Social Affairs	Othman Wok	16 April 1968 – 30 June 1977
Minister for Social Affairs	Toh Chin Chye	1 July 1977 – 4 September 1977 (acting)
Minister for Social Affairs	Ahmad Mattar	5 September 1977 – 31 May 1984 (acting)
Minister for Law	E. W. Barker	2 June 1975 – 12 September 1988
Minister for the Environment	E. W. Barker	2 June 1975 – 31 January 1979
Minister for the Environment	Lim Kim San	1 February 1979 – 5 January 1981
Minister for Home Affairs	Chua Sian Chin	1 November 1972 – 1 January 1985
Minister for Education	Chua Sian Chin	20 October 1975 – 11 February 1979
Minister for Education	Goh Keng Swee	12 February 1979 – 31 May 1980
Minister for Education	Tony Tan	1 June 1980 – 31 May 1981
Minister for Finance	Hon Sui Sen	11 August 1970 – 14 October 1983
Minister for Trade and Industry	Goh Chok Tong	15 March 1979 – 31 May 1981
Minister without portfolio	Othman Wok	1 July 1977 – 5 January 1981
Minister without portfolio	Jek Yeun Thong	26 September 1977 – 5 January 1981
Minister without portfolio	Lim Chee Onn	15 September 1980 – 1 August 1983

== List of office holders ==
The following is the list of office holders in the Fifth Lee Kuan Yew Cabinet. Cabinet members are listed in bold.

Prime Minister's Office
Office	Name	Term start	Term end
Prime Minister	**Lee Kuan Yew**	31 December 1976	5 January 1981
Deputy Prime Minister	**Goh Keng Swee**	31 December 1976	31 May 1980
First Deputy Prime Minister	**Goh Keng Swee**	1 June 1980	5 January 1981
Second Deputy Prime Minister (Foreign Affairs)	**S. Rajaratnam**	1 June 1980	5 January 1981
Minister without portfolio	**Othman Wok**	1 July 1977	5 January 1981
Minister without portfolio	**Jek Yeun Thong**	26 September 1977	5 January 1981
Minister without portfolio	**Lim Chee Onn**	15 September 1980	5 January 1981
Senior Minister of State for the Prime Minister's Office	Lee Khoon Choy	12 February 1979	5 January 1981
Minister of State for the Prime Minister's Office	Ya'acob Mohamed	3 January 1977	25 October 1977
Minister of State	Ya'acob Mohamed	26 October 1977	5 January 1981
Parliamentary Secretary for the Prime Minister's Office	Chin Harn Tong	17 March 1980	5 January 1981
Ministry of Communications
Office	Name	Term start	Term end
Minister for Communications	**Lim Kim San**	31 December 1976	30 June 1978
Minister for Communications	**Ong Teng Cheong**	1 July 1978	5 January 1981
Senior Minister of State for Communications	Ong Teng Cheong	31 December 1976	30 June 1978
Parliamentary Secretary for Communications	Sidek Saniff	1 April 1980	5 January 1981
Ministry of Culture
Office	Name	Term start	Term end
Minister for Culture	**Jek Yeun Thong**	31 December 1976	25 September 1977
Minister for Culture	**Ong Teng Cheong** (Note: In an acting capacity.)	26 September 1977	5 January 1981
Parliamentary Secretary for Culture	Ow Chin Hock	1 October 1977	5 January 1981
Parliamentary Secretary for Culture	Sidek Saniff	1 April 1980	5 January 1981
Ministry of Defence
Office	Name	Term start	Term end
Minister for Defence	**Goh Keng Swee**	31 December 1976	11 February 1979
Minister for Defence	**Howe Yoon Chong**	12 February 1979	5 January 1981
Minister of State for Defence	Bernard Chen	24 May 1977	5 January 1981
Senior Parliamentary Secretary for Defence	Phua Bah Lee	31 December 1976	5 January 1981
Ministry of Education
Office	Name	Term start	Term end
Minister for Education	**Chua Sian Chin**	31 December 1976	11 February 1979
Minister for Education	**Goh Keng Swee**	12 February 1979	31 May 1980
Minister for Education	**Tony Tan**	1 June 1980	5 January 1981
Senior Minister of State for Education	Chai Chong Yii	31 December 1976	5 January 1981
Senior Minister of State for Education	Tony Tan	12 February 1979	31 May 1980
Parliamentary Secretary for Education	Ahmad Mattar	3 January 1977	4 September 1977
Ministry of the Environment
Office	Name	Term start	Term end
Minister for the Environment	**E. W. Barker**	31 December 1976	31 January 1979
Minister for the Environment	**Lim Kim San**	1 February 1979	5 January 1981
Senior Parliamentary Secretary for the Environment	Chor Yeok Eng	31 December 1976	5 January 1981
Ministry of Finance
Office	Name	Term start	Term end
Minister for Finance	**Hon Sui Sen**	31 December 1976	5 January 1981
Senior Minister of State for Finance	Goh Chok Tong	1 September 1977	14 March 1979
Senior Minister of State for Finance	Tan Eng Liang	1 June 1978	19 February 1979
Ministry of Foreign Affairs
Office	Name	Term start	Term end
Minister for Foreign Affairs	**S. Rajaratnam**	31 December 1976	31 May 1980
Minister for Foreign Affairs	**S. Dhanabalan**	1 June 1980	5 January 1981
Senior Minister of State for Foreign Affairs	Abdul Rahim Ishak	31 December 1976	5 January 1981
Senior Minister of State for Foreign Affairs	Lee Khoon Choy	31 December 1976	11 February 1979
Senior Minister of State for Foreign Affairs	S. Dhanabalan	12 February 1979	31 May 1980
Parliamentary Secretary for Foreign Affairs	Ong Soo Chuan	31 December 1976	31 July 1978
Ministry of Health
Office	Name	Term start	Term end
Minister for Health	**Toh Chin Chye**	31 December 1976	5 January 1981
Ministry of Home Affairs
Office	Name	Term start	Term end
Minister for Home Affairs	**Chua Sian Chin**	31 December 1976	5 January 1981
Parliamentary Secretary for Home Affairs	Lim Guan Hoo	31 December 1976	30 June 1977
Parliamentary Secretary for Home Affairs	Chin Harn Tong	1 July 1978	16 March 1980
Ministry of Labour
Office	Name	Term start	Term end
Minister for Labour	**Ong Pang Boon**	31 December 1976	5 January 1981
Minister of State for Labour	Sia Kah Hui	31 December 1976	5 January 1981
Senior Parliamentary Secretary for Labour	Fong Sip Chee	31 December 1976	5 January 1981
Ministry of Law
Office	Name	Term start	Term end
Minister for Law	**E. W. Barker**	31 December 1976	5 January 1981
Ministry of National Development
Office	Name	Term start	Term end
Minister for National Development	**Lim Kim San**	31 December 1976	31 January 1979
Minister for National Development	**Teh Cheang Wan**	1 February 1979	5 January 1981
Senior Minister of State for National Development	Tan Eng Liang	31 December 1976	31 May 1978
Senior Minister of State for National Development	S. Dhanabalan	16 June 1978	11 February 1979
Parliamentary Secretary for National Development	Ho Cheng Choon	31 December 1976	31 March 1979
Parliamentary Secretary for National Development	Lee Yiok Seng	1 March 1979	5 January 1981
Ministry of Science and Technology
Office	Name	Term start	Term end
Minister for Science and Technology	**Jek Yeun Thong**	31 December 1976	25 September 1977
Minister for Science and Technology	**E. W. Barker**	26 September 1977	5 January 1981
Ministry of Social Affairs
Office	Name	Term start	Term end
Minister for Social Affairs	**Othman Wok**	31 December 1976	30 June 1977
Minister for Social Affairs	**Toh Chin Chye**	1 July 1977	4 September 1977
Minister for Social Affairs	**Ahmad Mattar**	5 September 1977	5 January 1981
Minister of State for Social Affairs	Ahmad Mattar	5 September 1977	5 January 1981
Senior Parliamentary Secretary for Social Affairs	Chan Chee Seng	31 December 1976	5 January 1981
Ministry of Trade and Industry (from 15 March 1979)
Office	Name	Term start	Term end
Minister for Trade and Industry	**Goh Chok Tong**	15 March 1979	5 January 1981
