= Ministry of Manpower (Singapore) =

Ministry of the Government of Singapore

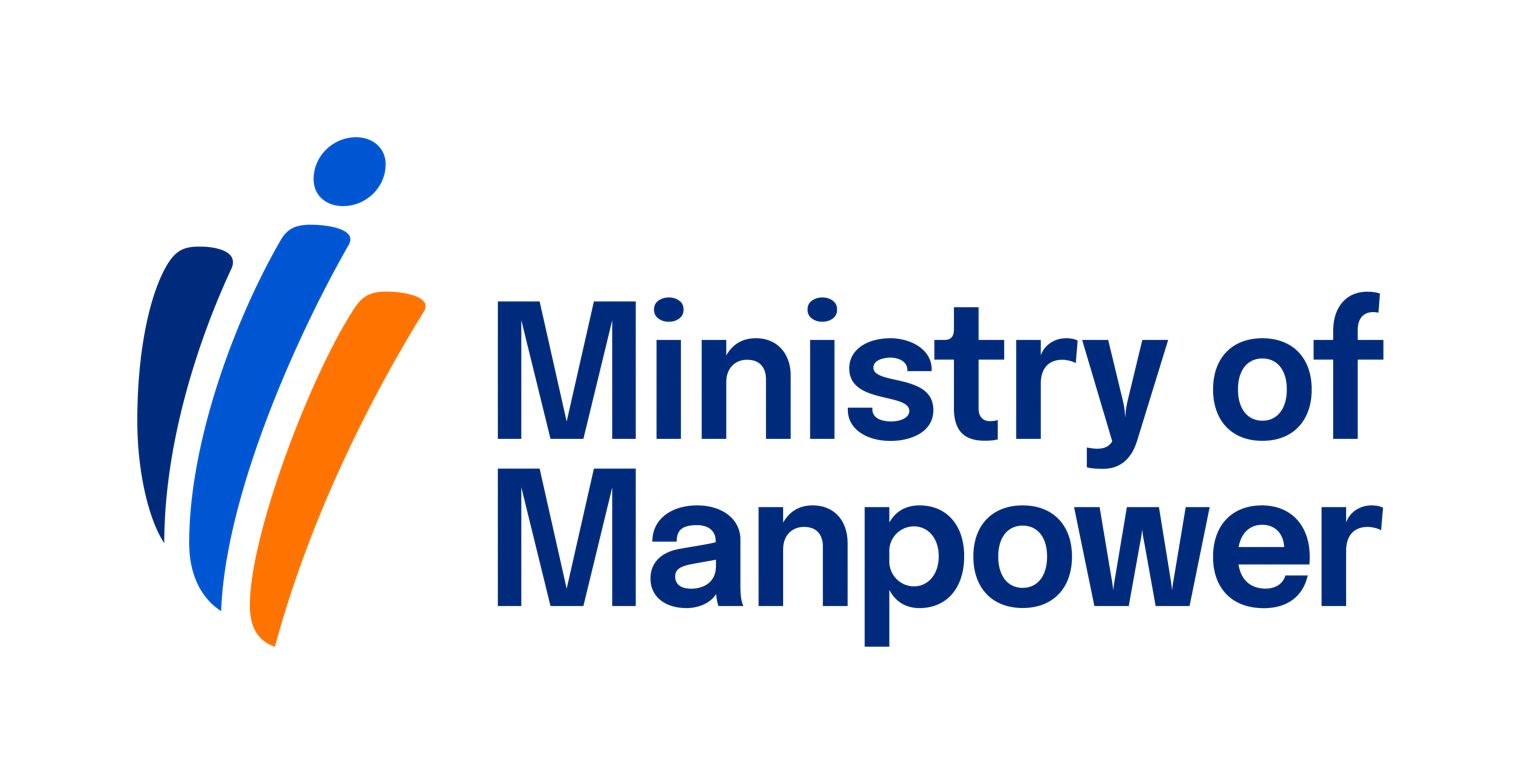

Agency overview
- Formed: 1 April 1998; 28 years ago (As Ministry of Manpower); 6 April 1955; 71 years ago (As Ministry of Labour)
- Preceding agency: Ministry of Labour (1955–1998)
- Jurisdiction: Government of Singapore
- Headquarters: 18 Havelock Road, Singapore 059764
- Motto: Great Workforce, Great Workplace
- Employees: 2,239 (2018)
- Annual budget: ▲ S$3.87 billion (2023)
- Ministers responsible: Jasmin Lau, Acting Minister; Dinesh Vasu Dash, Minister of State; Foo Cexiang, Minister of State; Shawn Huang, Senior Parliamentary Secretary
- Agency executives: Stanley Loh, Permanent Secretary; Kenneth Er, Second Permanent Secretary; Kenny Tan, Deputy Secretary (Workforce); Joan Moh, Deputy Secretary (Workplaces)
- Child agencies: Central Provident Fund Board; Singapore Labour Foundation; Skills and Workforce Development Agency
- Website: www.mom.gov.sg
- Agency ID: T08GA0019C

The Ministry of Manpower (MOM; Malay: Kementerian Tenaga Manusia; Chinese: 新加坡人力部; Tamil: மனிதவள அமைச்சு) is a ministry of the Government of Singapore responsible for the formulation and implementation of policies related to the workforce in Singapore. It was formerly known as the Ministry of Labour from 1955 to 1998.

== Organisational structure ==
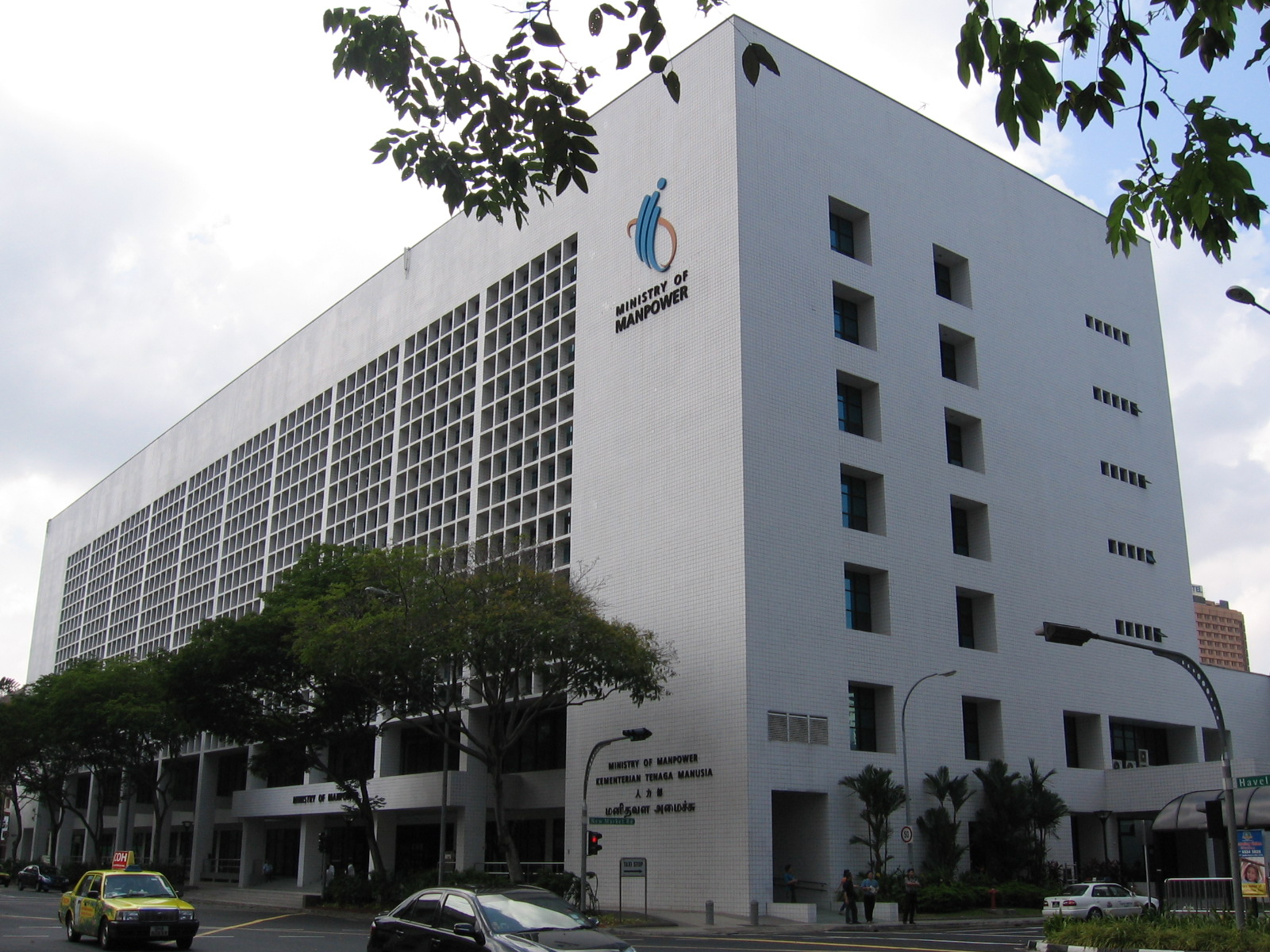
Ministry of Manpower building at Havelock Road, Singapore.

The Ministry oversees 3 statutory boards, the Central Provident Fund Board, the Singapore Labour Foundation and Workforce Singapore.

=== Statutory Boards ===
- Central Provident Fund Board
- Singapore Labour Foundation
- Workforce Singapore

== Ministers ==
The Ministry is led by the Minister for Manpower, who is appointed as a member of the Cabinet of Singapore. At its formation, the portfolio was titled Minister for Labour before being renamed to its present designation in 1998. The ministry itself was established following the 1955 election during David Marshall's First Cabinet, with Lim Yew Hock serving as its inaugural minister. Lim retained the portfolio following Marshall's resignation in 1956, continuing to head the Labour Ministry in his own Cabinet after assuming office as the Chief Minister, and remained in the position until the 1959 election. The incumbent Acting Minister is Jasmin Lau, an MP for Ang Mo Kio GRC from the People's Action Party.

=== Minister for Labour (1955–1998) ===
Minister	Took office	Left office	Party	Cabinet
Lim Yew Hock; MP for Havelock (1914–1984)	6 April 1955	3 June 1959	LF (until 1958)	Marshall
Lim Yew Hock; MP for Havelock (1914–1984)	6 April 1955	3 June 1959	LF (until 1958)	Lim
Lim Yew Hock; MP for Havelock (1914–1984)	6 April 1955	3 June 1959	SPA (from 1958)	Lim
K. M. Byrne; MP for Crawford (1913–1990)	5 June 1959	23 September 1961	PAP	Lee K. I
Ahmad Ibrahim; MP for Sembawang (1927–1962)	24 September 1961	21 August 1962	PAP	Lee K. I
Ong Pang Boon; MP for Telok Ayer (born 1929); Acting	21 August 1962	18 October 1963	PAP	Lee K. I
Jek Yeun Thong; MP for Queenstown (1930–2018)	19 October 1963	15 April 1968	PAP	Lee K. II
S. Rajaratnam; MP for Kampong Glam (1915–2006)	16 April 1968	4 July 1971	PAP	Lee K. III
Ong Pang Boon; MP for Telok Ayer (born 1929)	5 July 1971	5 January 1981	PAP	Lee K. III
Ong Pang Boon; MP for Telok Ayer (born 1929)	5 July 1971	5 January 1981	PAP	Lee K. IV
Ong Pang Boon; MP for Telok Ayer (born 1929)	5 July 1971	5 January 1981	PAP	Lee K. V
Ong Teng Cheong; MP for Kim Keat (1936–2002)	6 January 1981	8 May 1983	PAP	Lee K. VI
E. W. Barker; MP for Tanglin (1920–2001)	9 May 1983	6 September 1983	PAP	Lee K. VI
S. Jayakumar; MP for Bedok (born 1939)	7 September 1983	1 January 1985	PAP	Lee K. VI
Lee Yock Suan; MP for Cheng San (until 1988) and Cheng San GRC (from 1988) (born 1946)	2 January 1985	1 January 1992	PAP	Lee K. VII
Lee Yock Suan; MP for Cheng San (until 1988) and Cheng San GRC (from 1988) (born 1946)	2 January 1985	1 January 1992	PAP	Lee K. VIII
Lee Yock Suan; MP for Cheng San (until 1988) and Cheng San GRC (from 1988) (born 1946)	2 January 1985	1 January 1992	PAP	Goh I
Lee Yock Suan; MP for Cheng San (until 1988) and Cheng San GRC (from 1988) (born 1946)	2 January 1985	1 January 1992	PAP	Goh II
Lee Boon Yang; MP for Jalan Besar GRC (born 1947)	2 January 1992	31 March 1998	PAP	Goh II
Lee Boon Yang; MP for Jalan Besar GRC (born 1947)	2 January 1992	31 March 1998	PAP	Goh III

=== Minister for Manpower (1998–present) ===
Minister	Took office	Left office	Party	Cabinet
Lee Boon Yang; MP for Jalan Besar GRC (born 1947)	1 April 1998	11 May 2003	PAP	Goh III
Lee Boon Yang; MP for Jalan Besar GRC (born 1947)	1 April 1998	11 May 2003	PAP	Goh IV
Ng Eng Hen (Note: Ng Eng Hen served as acting minister from 12 May 2003 until 11 August 2004.); MP for Bishan–Toa Payoh GRC (born 1958)	12 May 2003	11 August 2004	PAP	Goh IV
Ng Eng Hen; MP for Bishan–Toa Payoh GRC (born 1958)	12 August 2004	31 March 2008	PAP	Lee H. I
Ng Eng Hen; MP for Bishan–Toa Payoh GRC (born 1958)	12 August 2004	31 March 2008	PAP	Lee H. II
Gan Kim Yong (Note: Gan Kim Yong served as acting minister from 1 April 2008 until 31 March 2009.); MP for Chua Chu Kang SMC (born 1959)	1 April 2008	31 March 2009	PAP	Lee H. II
Gan Kim Yong; MP for Chua Chu Kang SMC (born 1959)	1 April 2009	20 May 2011	PAP	Lee H. II
Tharman Shanmugaratnam; MP for Jurong GRC (born 1957)	21 May 2011	31 July 2012	PAP	Lee H. III
Tan Chuan-Jin (Note: Tan Chuan-Jin served as acting minister from 1 August 2012 until 30 April 2014.); MP for Marine Parade GRC (born 1969)	1 August 2012	30 April 2014	PAP	Lee H. III
Tan Chuan-Jin; MP for Marine Parade GRC (born 1969)	1 May 2014	3 May 2015	PAP	Lee H. III
Lim Swee Say; MP for East Coast GRC (born 1954)	4 May 2015	30 April 2018	PAP	Lee H. III
Lim Swee Say; MP for East Coast GRC (born 1954)	4 May 2015	30 April 2018	PAP	Lee H. IV
Josephine Teo; MP for Bishan–Toa Payoh GRC (until 2020) and Jalan Besar GRC (from 2020) (born 1968)	1 May 2018	14 May 2021	PAP	Lee H. IV
Josephine Teo; MP for Bishan–Toa Payoh GRC (until 2020) and Jalan Besar GRC (from 2020) (born 1968)	1 May 2018	14 May 2021	PAP	Lee H. V
Tan See Leng; MP for Marine Parade GRC (until 2025) and Chua Chu Kang GRC (from 2025) (born 1964)	15 May 2021	26 July 2026	PAP	Lee H. V
Tan See Leng; MP for Marine Parade GRC (until 2025) and Chua Chu Kang GRC (from 2025) (born 1964)	15 May 2021	26 July 2026	PAP	Wong I
Tan See Leng; MP for Marine Parade GRC (until 2025) and Chua Chu Kang GRC (from 2025) (born 1964)	15 May 2021	26 July 2026	PAP	Wong II
Jasmin Lau; MP for Ang Mo Kio GRC (born 1983); Acting	27 July 2026	Incumbent	PAP	Wong II

== See also ==
- Central Provident Fund Board
- Employment in Singapore
