= Skills and Workforce Development Agency =

Government agency in Singapore

Agency overview
- Formed: 1 July 2026; 3 months ago
- Preceding agencies: SkillsFuture Singapore (SSG); Workforce Singapore (WSG)
- Headquarters: Singapore; 1.3175°N 103.8914°E
- Agency executives: Lim Sim Seng, Chairman; Dilys Boey, Chief Executive
- Parent agency: Ministry of Education; Ministry of Manpower
- Website: www.swda.gov.sg

The Skills and Workforce Development Agency (SWDA) is a statutory board jointly overseen by the Ministry of Education and the Ministry of Manpower. Established on 1 July 2026, the agency was formed through the merger of two existing workforce and training statutory bodies: SkillsFuture Singapore (SSG) and Workforce Singapore (WSG).

SWDA was created to bring adult education, lifelong learning, job matching, and workforce transformation initiatives under a single administrative authority to streamline services for Singapore citizens, permanent residents, and local businesses.

== History ==
On 8 April 2026, the Ministry of Manpower introduced the Skills and Workforce Development Agency Bill to Parliament. The legislation was formally passed on 5 May 2026.

The agency officially commenced operations on 1 July 2026. Dilys Boey, previously chief executive of Workforce Singapore, was appointed as the inaugural chief executive of SWDA, while Lim Sim Seng was appointed chairman of the board.
