= Workforce Singapore =

Government agency in Singapore

Agency overview
- Formed: 17 September 2003; 23 years ago (as Workforce Development Agency); 4 October 2016; 10 years ago (as Workforce Singapore)
- Preceding agency: Skills and Workforce Development Agency (SWDA)
- Headquarters: 1 Paya Lebar Link, #08-08 PLQ 2 Paya Lebar Quarter, Singapore 408533
- Agency executives: Mr Chew Hock Yong, Chairman; Dilys Boey, Chief Executive
- Parent agency: Ministry of Manpower
- Website: www.wsg.gov.sg, www.mycareersfuture.gov.sg
- Agency ID: T08GB0060H

Workforce Singapore (WSG) is a statutory board under the Ministry of Manpower of the Government of Singapore. It was originally founded in 2003 as the Workforce Development Agency (WDA). In 2016, the WDA was renamed the Workforce Singapore Agency, and some of its functions were transferred to the new SkillsFuture Singapore Agency. In 2026, it merged with SkillsFuture Singapore to form the Skills and Workforce Development Agency (SWDA).

During the worldwide COVID-19 pandemic in 2020, when many Singapore citizens and Permanent Residents lost their jobs due to the closure of businesses, Workforce Singapore played a vital part in career-coaching the people of Singapore into transitioning into essential industries. For example, it helped by organising resume-crafting services both over the phone and in person with unemployed job-seekers, and it had a website that consolidated career resources, training programmes, as well as job openings.

In April 2018, Workforce Singapore launched MyCareersFuture (mycareersfuture.gov.sg), a digital job portal developed in collaboration with GovTech Singapore to replace the previous "Jobs Bank." The platform was designed to shift the local employment landscape toward a skills-based matching approach. Utilizing an AI-powered "Job-to-Skills" matching engine, it helps Singapore Citizens and Permanent Residents identify relevant roles based on their specific competencies and highlights potential skills gaps for upskilling. The portal also features CareersFinder, a data-driven tool that provides personalized career path recommendations and facilitates access to government initiatives, such as the Career Conversion Programme (CCP).

On 24 June 2026, the Ministry of Manpower announced that the Skills and Workforce Development Agency (SWDA), a new statutory board under the ministry, would be established on 1 July 2026 through the merger of SkillsFuture Singapore (SSG) and Workforce Singapore (WSG).
