= Bukit Batok Single Member Constituency (1972 – 1997) =

Former electoral division in Singapore

Bukit Batok
- Former Single Member constituency for the Parliament of Singapore
- Region: West Region, Singapore
- Electorate: 24,908

Former constituency
- Created: 1972; 54 years ago
- Abolished: 1997; 29 years ago
- Seats: 1
- Party: People's Action Party
- Member: Constituency abolished
- Merged into: Jurong GRC (1997)

Bukit Batok Single Member Constituency was a single-member constituency (SMC) in western Singapore. It was established in 1972and was merged into Ang Mo Kio Group Representation Constituency (GRC) in 1997. The last Member of Parliament (MP) for the constituency was Ong Chit Chung from the People's Action Party (PAP).

A constituency of the same name was recreated in 2015 and was merged into Jurong East–Bukit Batok GRC.

== History ==
Bukit Batok Constituency was created in 1972 from parts of the constituencies of Bukit Timah, Chua Chu Kang and Bukit Panjang. It was renamed Bukit Batok SMC in 1988 following the establishment of GRC and SMC.

Prior to the 1997 general election, Bukit Batok SMC was merged into Jurong GRC.

== Member of Parliament ==
Year	Member	Party
Formation
1972	Chai Chong Yii	PAP
1976	Chai Chong Yii	PAP
1980	Chai Chong Yii	PAP
1984	Chai Chong Yii	PAP
1988	Ong Chit Chung	PAP
1991	Ong Chit Chung	PAP
Constituency abolished (1997)

== Electoral results ==
Note: The Elections Department does not include rejected votes when calculating the vote shares of candidates. Hence, all candidates' vote shares will total to 100% at any given election (may not appear so in multi-way contests due to rounding).

=== Elections in 1970s ===
General Election 1972
Party	Candidate	Votes	%
PAP	Chai Chong Yii	9,765	73.78
UNF	Vetrivelu Rengaswamy	3,471	26.22
Majority		6,294	47.56
Total valid votes		13,236	97.16
Rejected ballots		387	2.84
Turnout		13,623	93.55
Registered electors		14,563	
PAP win (new seat)			

General Election 1976
Party	Candidate	Votes	%	±%
PAP	Chai Chong Yii	12,216	84.57	▲10.79
SJP	Sulaiman Jaffar	2,229	15.43	N/A
Majority		9,987	69.14	▲21.6
Total valid votes		14,445	96.88	▼0.28
Rejected ballots		465	3.12	▲0.28
Turnout		14,910	95.27	▲1.72
Registered electors		15,650		▲7.46
PAP hold		Swing	▲10.79	

=== Elections in 1980s ===
General Election 1980
Party	Candidate	Votes	%	±%
PAP	Chai Chong Yii	Unopposed		
Registered electors		18,275		▲16.77
PAP hold				

General Election 1984
Party	Candidate	Votes	%	±%
PAP	Chai Chong Yii	14,767	78.27	N/A
UPF	Tan Jue Kit	4,099	21.73	N/A
Majority		10,668	56.54	N/A
Total valid votes		18,866	96.23	N/A
Rejected ballots		740	3.77	N/A
Turnout		19,606	94.21	N/A
Registered electors		20,812		▲13.88
PAP hold		Swing	N/A	

General Election 1988
Party	Candidate	Votes	%	±%
PAP	Ong Chit Chung	12,873	55.94	▼22.33
SDP	Kwan Yue Keng	10,139	44.06	N/A
Majority		2,734	11.88	▼44.66
Total valid votes		23,012	96.88	▲0.65
Rejected ballots		381	3.12	▼0.65
Turnout		23,393	96.91	▲2.7
Registered electors		24,138		▲15.98
PAP hold		Swing	▼22.33	

=== Elections in 1990s ===
General Election 1991
Party	Candidate	Votes	%	±%
PAP	Ong Chit Chung	12,205	51.82	▼4.12
SDP	Kwan Yue Keng	11,347	48.18	▲4.12
Majority		858	3.64	▼8.24
Total valid votes		23,552	97.86	▲0.98
Rejected ballots		515	2.14	▼0.98
Turnout		24,067	96.6	▼0.3
Registered electors		24,908		▲3.19
PAP hold		Swing	▼4.12	
