= Phey Yew Kok =

Singaporean former politician (born 1934)

Phey Yew Kok BBM
- 彭由国

Member of the Singapore Parliament for Boon Teck Constituency
- In office 2 September 1972 – 31 March 1980
- Preceded by: Constituency established
- Succeeded by: Liew Kok Phun
- Majority: 1972: 4,993 (33.51%); 1976: 7,740 (43.84%)

Personal details
- Born: 2 July 1934 (age 92) Singapore, Straits Settlements
- Party: People's Action Party (1972–1980)
- Spouse: 1
- Children: 3
- Education: Singapore Technical Institute
- Occupation: Politician
- Profession: Trade union representative
- Criminal information
- Status: Released
- Convictions: Criminal breach of trust (10 counts); Offences under the Trade Unions Act
- Penalty: 60 months of imprisonment

Details
- Date apprehended: 22 June 2015

Phey Yew Kok (Note: Chinese: 彭由国; Pe̍h-ōe-jī: Phêⁿ Iû-kok; pinyin: Péng Yóuguó) (born 2 July 1934) is a Singaporean former politician and union leader. A former member of the governing People's Action Party (PAP), he was the Member of Parliament for Boon Teck Constituency from 1972 to 1980 and the President of the National Trades Union Congress from 1970 to 1980. He was convicted in 2016 for charges of misuse of union funds laid against him in 1979. He had previously been on the run for 35 years before surrendering to Singapore authorities in 2015.

== Early life and education ==
Phey was born on 2 July 1934 in Singapore. He was educated in a Chinese stream secondary school before switching to an English stream secondary school. He also studied accountancy at the Singapore Technical Institute (now Singapore Polytechnic) while teaching at a primary school.

== Career ==
Phey started working in the Malaysia–Singapore Airlines (MSA) as an accounts clerk. While working at MSA, Phey began to suffer from hearing loss due to him working at the airport where there was high levels of noise. When he was promoted to be a planning officer in the production and planning department of MSA, he joined its union, Singapore Air Transport Union (SATU) (Note: The union representing air transport workers went through several changes of name over time. Prior to 1967, it was known as "Malayan Airways/Qantas Empire Airways Local Employees' Union", and in 1984, SATU was split into three house unions.) and was elected into SATU's executive committee in 1960. He subsequently held the treasurer post in SATU in 1966, and finally the president position in 1968.

=== Labour career ===
Devan Nair took notice of him in 1969, and under Devan's mentorship, Phey also became the General Secretary of two other prominent unions, Singapore Industrial Labour Organisation (SILO) and Pioneer Industries Employees' Union (PIEU) by 1970. Phey also became the president of National Trades Union Congress (NTUC) in the same year. By then, he was also promoted into the planning division of Singapore Airlines, the Singapore successor of MSA.

In November 1969, Phey was slashed in the thigh while leaving the Union House located on Beng Wan Road. On 21 July 1970, he was again slashed by four men over union infighting at Stirling Road, which left him with a 7.5 cm scar on his face. The attacks were alleged to be committed by Theyvendran Ramanathan, a Malaysia–Singapore Airlines technical records officer, over the elections of SATU. Ramanathan was later granted a full acquittal due to a lack of reliable prosecution witnesses.

Under Phey's leadership, SILO grew its membership from 4,000 to 12,000 within a year, and acquired a headquarters for $210,000 in 1971.

On 25 May 1979, Phey became the chairman of NTUC.

==== Misuse of union funds ====
In 1977, an amendment to the Trade Unions Act was introduced and passed in the Parliament to limit the usage of the funds of registered trade unions to just investments in stocks and shares of companies, and to require ministerial approval before the funds could be used. On 16 September 1978, Phey used $11,235 of SILO's funds to finance the purchase of shares of a supermarket. On 18 September 1979, he used $6,510 of PIEU's funds to purchase shares of another supermarket. Neither purchase was done with the legally required ministerial approval. In mid-1979, the Corrupt Practices Investigation Bureau (CPIB) launched an investigation into Phey over alleged malpractices in SILO and PIEU. On 4 December, Phey tendered his resignations at SILO and PIEU. However, these were held in abeyance until he was formally dismissed from all union posts in absentia on 8 January 1980. Nair, now the president of NTUC, was appointed as the acting general secretary for SILO and PIEU.

Phey was formally charged on 10 December on two counts of the laws introduced in the 1977 amendments, over the abovementioned share purchases, and on four additional counts of criminal breach of trust. He pleaded not guilty and was placed under a $100,000 bail, pending a court hearing on 7 January 1980. However, Phey did not turn up in court, which led to $95,000 of the bail money being forfeited. Phey was last seen in Singapore on 31 December 1979 by his family members, and could not be contacted since then. It was widely accepted that Phey had fled the country and an arrest warrant for him was placed. His passport had not been surrendered and was valid for travel, as he had not shown that he was about, or intended, to flee Singapore. He was thus placed on Interpol's wanted list, while his passport was cancelled. Subsequent investigations found that Phey left Singapore on 31 December 1979 for Kuala Lumpur via train, and thereafter proceeded to Thailand where he disappeared. Over the years, CPIB engaged Interpol and its affiliate countries' members to look for him. The Bureau also sent officers to Thailand to find him, and even Thai authorities had conducted raids to find Phey despite having no extradition treaty with Singapore.

In a Parliament session on 12 March 1984, it was revealed that the total money lost by the unions and union-related enterprises between 1975 and 1979 was $704,173.93. Of the lost money, $557,864.76 had been recovered.

In addition to the general secretary positions at SILO and PIEU, Phey was also removed from his directorship at the Singapore Labour Foundation and ceased to be a member of Skills Development Fund's advisory council. Officials associated with Phey in the various trade unions were implicated in this case, with ten faced charges of ranging from criminal breach of trust to abetting after CPIB had conducted further investigations.

By 1982, both SILO and PIEU were broken up and restructured by a task force from NTUC into nine industrial unions. In 1984, SATU was also dissolved into three house unions.

Phey was dismissed from his president post in the Singapore Amateur Boxing Association and Singapore Bus Service. An annual popular invitational basketball tournament, in Phey's namesake, which was first held in 1976 by SATU, SILO and PIEU, was cancelled in 1980.

=== Political career ===
Phey entered politics in the 1972 general election under the PAP banner for Boon Teck constituency, and won 66.8% of the vote. He attributed his win by saying that many in the constituency were members of SILO and PIEU. Phey was reelected in the same constituency in the 1976 general election, winning 71.9% of the vote.

Phey had applied for a leave of absence from the Parliament of Singapore and it was granted on 4 January 1980. The leave was revoked on 26 February 1980 as its purpose, for Phey to deal with his court cases, was no longer valid with his escape from Singapore. His seat for Boon Teck constituency was vacated on the deadline of 31 March 1980 set by the Speaker, after he failed to turn up for Parliament. Despite calls for a by-election, the seat remained vacant until the general election at the end of the year.

=== On the run and surrender ===
While on the run in Thailand, Phey worked odd jobs to support himself and had no permanent address as he had no form of identification with him. On his return, Phey was completely blind in his right eye and suffered from severe hearing impairment. On 22 June 2015, Phey turned himself in at the Singapore embassy in Bangkok, and was brought back to Singapore the following day. He pleaded guilty to 12 of 34 charges, and was sentenced to jail for a period of 60 months. The sentence was backdated to when he was first remanded on 23 June 2015. On 24 October 2019, he was placed under the Singapore Prison Service's Home Detention Scheme (HDS) after he was deemed suitable for it. The HDS allowed prisoners to serve the remainder of their sentences in the community, under supervision. He completed the jail sentence on 23 October 2020, including one year under home detention.

== Personal life ==
Phey is married with three children, at least two of whom are sons.

== Honours ==
=== National honours ===
- Singapore:
  - Bintang Bakti Masyarakat (1971)
