= Ong Leong Boon =

Singaporean politician (1944–2023)

Ong Leong Boon DUNU (First Class)
- 王龙文

Member of the Singapore Parliament for Kim Seng Constituency
- In office 2 September 1972 – 22 December 1980
- Preceded by: Constituency established
- Succeeded by: Yeo Ning Hong
- Majority: 1972: 8,178 (67.74%); 1976: 10,975 (77.65%)

Personal details
- Born: 1 March 1944 Japanese-occupied Singapore
- Died: 5 February 2023 (aged 78) Singapore
- Party: People's Action Party (1972–1980)
- Spouse: Mildred Tao (m. 1974)
- Education: University of Singapore
- Profession: Politician; orthopaedic surgeon

Ong Leong Boon (Note: Chinese: 王龙文; Pe̍h-ōe-jī: Ông Liông-bûn; pinyin: Wáng Lóngwén) (1 March 1944 – 5 February 2023) was a Singaporean politician and orthopaedic surgeon. A former member of the People's Action Party (PAP), he served as the Member of Parliament (MP) representing Kim Seng Single Member Constituency (SMC) from 1972 to 1980.

== Early life ==
Ong was born in Singapore, and studied at Raffles Institution. He entered the University of Singapore to study medicine. In 1966, the fourth year student was elected president of the University of Singapore Student's Union. He met the Prime Minister during the government's multiple dialog sessions with the varsity students.

== Medical career ==
From 1983 until retirement in 2008, Ong was in private practice at his orthopaedic surgery clinic.

In 1981, Ong founded the Asean Orthopaedic Association and served as secretary general, and was also the president of the Singapore Orthopaedic Association in 1983.

== Political career ==
Ong joined the People's Action Party to contest the general election in 1972. He won 8,178 votes (67.74%), and became the member of Parliament for Kim Seng. In 1976, he successfully defended his seat with 10,975 votes (77.65%), and became the Member of Parliament, for Kim Seng.

In 1980, he stepped down from politics to return to private medical practice.

== Other career ==
Ong was also involved in philanthropy and sports communities:

- Singapore Lawn Tennis Association - (1970s to 1990s)
- Singapore Golf Association - president (2006-2010)
- Children's Charities Association of Singapore - deputy chairman (1988-1989)

== Private life ==
Ong married Mildred Tao in 1974.
