= Singapore Labour Foundation =

Statutory board under the Ministry of Manpower

The Singapore Labour Foundation (SLF) was established on 12 December 1977 and is a statutory board under the Ministry of Manpower. Its aims are to improve the welfare of union members and to further the development of trade unions in Singapore.

The SLF provides financial support for the various educational, social, cultural and recreational activities and programmes organised by the National Trades Union Congress (NTUC) and its affiliated unions and co-operatives. The foundation also extends help to lower-income union members, and provides club and resort facilities to meet the recreational and social needs of its members.

== Management Board ==
It was announced on 8 June 2018 that Minister for Health Gan Kim Yong would relinquish his role as Chairman of the SLF. This change in stepping down as Chairman of the SLF was part of the leadership succession in the labour movement. Taking over chairmanship of the SLF Board was Minister for National Development and Second Minister for Finance Lawrence Wong.
