= Henderson Constituency =

Former Singaporean constituency

Henderson Constituency was a constituency in Singapore. It used to exist from 1972 to 1988, and it was merged into Tiong Bahru Group Representation Constituency. It was carved out of Tiong Bahru Constituency.

== Member of Parliament ==
Election	Member of Parliament	Party
1972	Lai Tha Chai	PAP
1976	Lai Tha Chai	PAP
1979	Lai Tha Chai	PAP
1980	Lai Tha Chai	PAP
1984	Lai Tha Chai	PAP

== Electoral results ==
Note : Elections Department Singapore do not include rejected votes for calculation of candidate's vote share. Hence, the total of all candidates' vote share will be 100%.

=== Elections in 1970s ===
General Election 1972
Party	Candidate	Votes	%
PAP	Lai Tha Chai	6,577	74.43
PF	Wong Wen Nan	2,260	25.57
Majority		4,459	48.86
Registered electors		9,431	
Turnout		8,837	93.70
PAP win (new seat)			
