= Boon Teck Constituency =

Former electoral division in Singapore

Coordinates: 1.339°N 103.852°E

Boon Teck
- Former Single Member constituency for the Parliament of Singapore
- Region: Singapore

Former constituency
- Created: 1972
- Abolished: 1988
- Seats: 1
- Member: Constituency abolished
- Replaced by: Toa Payoh GRC

Boon Teck Constituency was a constituency in Singapore.

In 1988, following the establishment of Group representation constituency (GRC) and SMC, it was merged into Toa Payoh GRC.

== History ==
In 1972, Phey Yew Kok entered politics during the 1972 general election under the PAP banner for Boon Teck constituency, and won 66.8% of the vote. He attributed his win by saying that many in the constituency were members of Singapore Industrial Labour Organisation (SILO) and Pioneer Industries Employees' Union of which he was the secretary general. Phey was reelected in the same constituency in the 1976 general election, winning 71.9% of the vote.

From 1978 to 1979, Phey used $11,235 of SILO's funds to finance the purchase of shares of a supermarket and $6,510 of PIEU's funds to purchase shares of another supermarket. Neither purchase was done accordingly to the amendment to the Trade Unions Act in 1977 and with the legally required ministerial approval.

In mid-1979, the Corrupt Practices Investigation Bureau (CPIB) launched an investigation into Phey over alleged malpractices in SILO and PIEU. Phey was formally charged on 10 December on two counts of the laws introduced in the 1977 amendments, over the abovementioned share purchases, and on four additional counts of criminal breach of trust. He pleaded not guilty and was placed under a $100,000 bail, pending a court hearing on 7 January 1980.

Phey applied for a leave of absence from the Parliament of Singapore and it was granted on 4 January 1980. The leave was revoked on 26 February 1980 as its purpose, for Phey to deal with his court cases, was no longer valid with his escape from Singapore. His seat for the constituency was vacated on the deadline of 31 March 1980 set by the Speaker, after he failed to turn up for Parliament. Despite calls for a by-election, the seat remained vacant until the general election at the end of the year.

== Member of Parliament ==
Year	Member	Party
Formation
1972	Phey Yew Kok	PAP
1976	Phey Yew Kok	PAP
1980	Liew Kok Phun	PAP
1984	Ho Tat Kin	PAP
Constituency abolished (1988)

== Electoral results ==
Note: The Elections Department does not include rejected votes when calculating the vote shares of candidates. Hence, all candidates' vote shares will total to 100% at any given election (may not appear so in multi-way contests due to rounding).

=== Elections in 1970s ===
General Election 1972
Party	Candidate	Votes	%
PAP	Phey Yew Kok	9,947	66.75
PF	Lim Thiam Hock	4,954	33.25
Majority		4,993	33.50
Total valid votes		14,901	97.94
Rejected ballots		314	2.06
Turnout		15,215	93.38
Registered electors		15,958	
PAP win (new seat)			

General Election 1976
Party	Candidate	Votes	%	±%
PAP	Phey Yew Kok	12,698	71.92	▲5.17
BS	Ng Seng Chua	4,958	28.08	N/A
Majority		7,740	43.84	▲10.34
Total valid votes		17,656	97.56	▼0.38
Rejected ballots		441	2.44	▲0.38
Turnout		18,097	95.89	▲2.51
Registered electors		18,872		▲24.04
PAP hold		Swing	▲5.17	

=== Elections in 1980s ===
General Election 1980
Party	Candidate	Votes	%	±%
PAP	Liew Kok Pun	11,917	68.14	▼3.78
BS	Lee Siew Choh	5,571	31.86	▲3.78
Majority		6,346	36.28	▼7.56
Total valid votes		17,488	97.86	▲0.30
Rejected ballots		383	2.14	▼0.30
Turnout		17,871	95.54	▼0.35
Registered electors		18,705		▼0.88
PAP hold		Swing	▼3.78	

General Election 1984
Party	Candidate	Votes	%	±%
PAP	Ho Tat Kin	10,224	56.16	▼11.98
BS	Lee Siew Choh	7,982	43.84	▲11.98
Majority		2,242	12.32	▼23.96
Total valid votes		18,206	97.83	▼0.03
Rejected ballots		404	2.17	▲0.03
Turnout		18,610	95.48	▲0.06
Registered electors		19,490		▲4.2
PAP hold		Swing	▼11.98	
