= Ang Kok Peng =

Singaporean politician and educator (1927–1997)

Ang Kok Peng BBM
- 洪国平
- Ang in 1977

Member of the Singapore Parliament for Buona Vista Constituency
- In office 23 December 1976 – 17 August 1988
- Preceded by: Constituency established
- Succeeded by: Peter Sung
- Majority: 1976: 12,704 (82.75%); 1980: N/A (walkover); 1984: N/A (walkover)

Member of the Singapore Parliament for Crawford Constituency
- In office 12 October 1972 – 6 December 1976
- Preceded by: Low Yong Nguan
- Succeeded by: Constituency abolished
- Majority: 1972: 6,040 (72.6%)

Singapore Ambassador to Japan
- In office 1968–1971
- Preceded by: Position established
- Succeeded by: Loy Keng Foo

Personal details
- Born: Ang Kok Peng; 4 December 1927 Taiping, Perak, Federated Malay States
- Died: 9 October 1997 (aged 69) Singapore
- Spouse: Ang Wai Hoong
- Children: 3
- Awards: Bintang Bakti Masyarakat, 1971

Ang Kok Peng (Note: Chinese: 洪国平; Pe̍h-ōe-jī: Âng Kok-pêng; pinyin: Hóng Guópíng) (4 December 1927 – 9 October 1997) was a Singaporean former politician and educator. A former member of the People's Action Party (PAP), he served as the Member of Parliament representing Crawford Constituency from 1972 to 1976 and Buona Vista Single Member Constituency from 1977 to 1988.

Ang also served as the Singapore Ambassador to Japan from 1968 to 1971, Minister of State for Communications from 1972 to 1974, and the Minister of State for Health from 1974 to 1976.

== Early life and education ==
Ang Kok Peng was born on 4 December 1927 in the Straits Settlements (present-day Taiping, Perak). In 1947, he was awarded a Raffles College Scholarship and, in 1956 and 1959, a Queen's Fellowship. In 1950, he got a Bachelor of Science in Chemistry at the University of Malaya and a Master's Degree and a Doctor of Philosophy in 1952 and 1955, respectively.

== Career ==
=== Academic career ===
In 1952, Ang started working at the University of Singapore as an assistant lecturer. He did research work in universities in Australia and England from 1956 to 1957 and 1959 to 1960, respectively. In 1968, he was appointed as the first ambassador of Singapore to Japan and ended in 1971, where he returned to working as dean of the Science Faculty at the University of Singapore.

=== Business career ===
In 1979, Ang was elected president of the Singapore Association for the Advancement of Science. He had also been serving as a non-executive director and auditor at LC Development since 1990 and 1991, respectively.

=== Political career ===
In 1972, Ang made his political debut at the general elections, contesting for Member of Parliament (MP) of Crawford Constituency against Wu Kher of Workers' Party and N. M. Abdul Wahid of United National Front. Ang was elected with 72.60% of the vote. He was also appointed Minister of State for Communications. In 1974, he became the Minister of State for Health, replacing his former ministry.

At the 1976 general elections, after Crawford Constituency was abolished, Ang contested for MP of Buona Vista Single Member Constituency (SMC), winning with 82.75% of the vote against United People's Front's Hashim bin Mukayat. In the 1980 and 1984 general election, he would contest for MP of Buona Vista SMC again, being elected unopposed both times. In 1988, he retired from politics.

== Personal life ==
Ang married Ang Wai Hoong and they had three children together. In 1971, he was awarded the Bintang Bakti Masyarakat.

Ang died on 9 October 1997 at 70 after suffering from lung cancer for two and a half years. The Ang Kok Peng Memorial Fund was set up for him, raising $500,000 for post-graduate and undergraduate students.
