= Chai Chong Yii =

Singaporean former politician (1935–2022)

- 蔡崇语
- Chai in 1977

Member of Parliament for Bukit Batok Constituency
- In office 12 October 1972 – 17 August 1988
- Preceded by: Constituency established
- Succeeded by: Ong Chit Chung
- Majority: 1972: 6,294 (47.56%); 1976: 9,987 (69.14%); 1980: N/A (walkover); 1984: 10,668 (56.54%)

Personal details
- Born: Chai Chong Yii; 1935 Jinjiang County, Fujian Province, Republic of China
- Died: 3 May 2022 (aged 86–87) Singapore
- Citizenship: China (1935–1967); Singapore (1968–2022)
- Party: People's Action Party
- Spouse: Khor Phaik Tin
- Children: 3
- Education: Nanyang University

Chai Chong Yii (Note: Chinese: 蔡崇语; pinyin: Cài Chóngyǔ) (1935 – 3 May 2022) was a China-born Singaporean former politician. A former member of the People's Action Party (PAP), he served as the Member of Parliament representing Bukit Batok Single Member Constituency from 1972 to 1988.

He also served as Minister of State and later Senior Minister of State of Education from 1972 to 1974 and 1975 to 1981 respectively, the Minister of State of Communications from 1974 to 1975, and the Senior Minister of State of Culture from January 1981 to May 1981.

== Early life and education ==
Chai was born in 1935 in China to peasants. His family migrated to Malaya (present-day Malaysia) when the Japanese started attacking coastal China. He spent his childhood in Taiping, Perak and attended Chung Ling High School and Nanyang University. He worked as a hawker and primary school teacher before entering Nanyang University. He took accounting and graduated in 1959 with a Bachelor in Commerce. He worked at Shell for 6 years before serving as the bursar of Nanyang University from 1965 to 1972.

== Political career ==
Chai had originally wanted to contest in the 1968 general election but was not able to due to having gotten his Singaporean citizenship in 1967, too late to place himself on the electoral register. He made his political debut at the 1972 general election, contesting for Member of Parliament (MP) representing Bukit Batok Single Member Constituency (SMC) against Rengaswamy Vetrivelu of United National Front. Chai was elected with 73.78% of the vote and was also appointed as Minister of State of Education.

In 1975, he was appointed Senior Minister of State of Education. Chai contested at the 1976 general election for MP representing Bukit Batok SMC against Sulaiman bin Jaffar of Singapore Justice Party. He was elected with 84.57% of the vote. From 1978 to 1979, he and the rest of the Education Ministry introduced the Special Assistance Plan in schools. In 1979, he laid the cornerstone of Bukit Batok Community Centre. In the 1980 general election, he contested for MP representing Bukit Batok SMC again, being elected unopposed.

At the 1984 general elections, he contested for MP of Bukit Batok SMC again, against Tan Jue Kit of United People's Front. He was elected with 78.27% of the vote. After this win, residents of Bukit Batok wanted to spend $4,000 on an advertisement to congratulate him. Chai instead donated the money to the Community Chest of Singapore. In 1988, he opened Bukit View Secondary School. He retired from politics that same year. Post his political career, Chai served as the auditor for PAP till 1996 and served as the Trade Representative to Taiwan from 1991 to 1994.

== Personal life ==
While he worked at Shell, he met his future wife Khor Phaik Tin, who studied at Teacher's College in Kuala Lumpur. In 2014, he and other retired PAP MPs wrote an essay on their experiences.

=== Death ===
Chai died on 3 May 2022 at 87. He was survived by his wife, 3 children, and 6 grandchildren.
