= Kim Seng Single Member Constituency =

Constituency in Singapore

Kim Seng Single Member Constituency was a constituency in Singapore. The constituency was formed in 1972 as Kim Seng Constituency by carving out parts of Bukit Ho Swee and Delta constituencies. In 1988, it was renamed as Kim Seng Single Member Constituency (SMC) as part of Singapore's political reforms. The SMC was merged into Kampong Glam Group Representation Constituency in 1991.

== Member of Parliament ==
Year	Member of Parliament	Party
1972	Ong Leong Boon	PAP
1976	Ong Leong Boon	PAP
1980	Yeo Ning Hong	PAP
1984	Yeo Ning Hong	PAP
1988	Yeo Ning Hong	PAP

== Electoral results ==
Note: The Elections Department does not include rejected votes when calculating the vote shares of candidates. Hence, all candidates' vote shares will total to 100% at any given election (may not appear so in multi-way contests due to rounding).

=== Elections in 1970s ===
General Election 1972: Kim Seng
Party	Candidate	Votes	%
PAP	Ong Leong Boon	8,178	67.74
WP	Heng Swee Tong	3,895	32.26
Majority		4,283	35.48
Registered electors		12,893	
Turnout		12,073	93.6
PAP win (new seat)			

General Election 1976: Kim Seng
Party	Candidate	Votes	%	±%
PAP	Ong Leong Boon	10,975	77.65	▲9.91
WP	Chiang Seok Keong	3,159	22.35	▼9.91
Majority		7,816	55.3	▲19.82
Registered electors		14,860		▲15.26
Turnout		14,134	95.1	▲1.5
PAP hold		Swing	▲9.91	

=== Elections in 1980s ===
General Election 1980: Kim Seng
Party	Candidate	Votes	%	±%
PAP	Yeo Ning Hong	11,109	80.55	N/A
WP	Seow Yong Chew	2,682	19.45	N/A
Majority		8,427	61.1	▲5.8
Registered electors		14,734		▼0.85
Turnout		13,791	93.6	▼1.5
PAP hold		Swing	▲2.9	

General Election 1984: Kim Seng
Party	Candidate	Votes	%	±%
PAP	Yeo Ning Hong	Unopposed		
Registered electors		22,136		▲50.24
PAP hold				

General Election 1988: Kim Seng
Party	Candidate	Votes	%	±%
PAP	Yeo Ning Hong	11,460	66.90	NA
WP	Seow Yong Chew	5,670	33.10	NA
Majority		5,790	33.8	N/A
Registered electors		18,474		▼16.54
Turnout		17,130	92.72	NA
PAP hold				
