= Crawford Constituency =

Former electoral division in Singapore

Crawford Constituency was a constituency in Singapore. It used to exist from 1959 to 1976, broke off from Rochore Constituency.

== History ==
During the 1963 general election, S. Thendayatha Bani stood as a BS candidate and won the elections.

In 1966, S.T. Bani was detained. While during detention, Bani resigned from BS and also his parliament seat on 9 January 1966, triggering a by-election.

== Member of Parliament ==
Year	Member	Party
Formation
1959	K. M. Byrne	PAP
1963	S. Thendayatha Bani	BS
Parliament of Singapore
1966	Ramaswamy Sellappa	PAP
1968	Low Yong Nguan	PAP
1972	Ang Kok Peng	PAP
Constituency abolished (1976)

== Electoral results ==
Note: The Elections Department does not include rejected votes when calculating the vote shares of candidates. Hence, all candidates' vote shares will total to 100% at any given election (may not appear so in multi-way contests due to rounding).

=== Elections in the 1950s ===
General Election 1959
Party	Candidate	Votes	%
PAP	K. M. Byrne	7,120	66.6
SPA	Teng Ling Siong	2,487	23.3
LSP	Chua Seng Kian	897	8.4
Independent	John Sim Keng Poh	191	1.8
Majority		4,633	43.3
Turnout		10,807	89.8
Registered electors		12,031	
PAP win (new seat)			

=== Elections in the 1960s ===
General Election 1963: Crawford
Party	Candidate	Votes	%	±%
BS	S. Thendayatha Bani	4,400	42.8	
PAP	K. M. Byrne	4,207	40.9	▼25.7
UPP	Lau Tok Keong	1,032	10.0	
Singapore Alliance Party	Hsieh Shao An	571	5.5	▼17.8
WP	Wong Hong Toy	81	0.8	
Majority		193	1.9	▼41.4
Turnout		10,401	95.0	▲5.2
Registered electors		10,949		▼9.0
BS gain from PAP		Swing	▲34.3	

By-election 1966: Crawford
Party	Candidate	Votes	%	±%
PAP	Ramaswamy Sellappa	Unopposed		
Registered electors		10,450		▼4.6
PAP gain from BS				

General Election 1968: Crawford
Party	Candidate	Votes	%	±%
PAP	Low Yong Nguan	Unopposed		
Registered electors		7,190		▼31.2
PAP hold				

=== Elections in the 1970s ===
General Election 1972: Crawford
Party	Candidate	Votes	%	±%
PAP	Ang Kok Peng	6,040	72.6	▲31.7
WP	Wu Kher	1,565	18.8	▲18.0
UNF	N. M. bin Abdul Wahid	714	8.6	
Majority		4,475	53.8	▲51.9
Turnout		8,524	91.8	▼3.2
Registered electors		9,285		▲29.1
PAP hold		Swing	▲31.7	
