= Kim Keat Single Member Constituency =

Former Single Member Constituency in Singapore

Coordinates: 1.334°N 103.857°E

Kim Keat
- Single Member constituency for the Parliament of Singapore
- Region: Singapore

Current constituency
- Created: 1968
- Seats: 1
- Member: Constituency Abolished
- Town Council: Toa Payoh
- Replaced by: Toa Payoh GRC; Bishan-Toa Payoh GRC

Kim Keat Single Member Constituency was a constituency in Singapore. It used to exist from 1968 to 1988 as Kim Keat Constituency and was renamed as Kim Keat Single Member Constituency (SMC) as part of Singapore's political reforms. The SMC was merged into Toa Payoh Group Representation Constituency in 1991. Ong Teng Cheong was the only Member of Parliament throughout its existence.

== Member of Parliament ==
Year	Member of Parliament	Party
1972	Ong Teng Cheong	PAP
1976	Ong Teng Cheong	PAP
1980	Ong Teng Cheong	PAP
1984	Ong Teng Cheong	PAP
1988	Ong Teng Cheong	PAP

== Electoral results ==
Note: The Elections Department does not include rejected votes when calculating the vote shares of candidates. Hence, all candidates' vote shares will total to 100% at any given election (may not appear so in multi-way contests due to rounding).

=== Elections in 1970s ===
General Election 1972: Kim Keat
Party	Candidate	Votes	%
PAP	Ong Teng Cheong	10,262	74.00
WP	Seow Khee Leng	3,022	21.79
UNF	W. J. Paglar	583	4.21
Majority		7,240	52.21
Registered electors		14,640	
PAP win (new seat)			

General Election 1976: Kim Keat
Party	Candidate	Votes	%	±%
PAP	Ong Teng Cheong	14,262	76.62	▲2.62
BS	Chin Tian Choo	4,353	23.38	
Registered electors		19,700		▲34.6
PAP hold		Swing	▲2.62	

=== Elections in 1980s ===
General Election 1980: Kim Keat
Party	Candidate	Votes	%	±%
PAP	Ong Teng Cheong	Unopposed		
Registered electors		20,781		▲5.5
PAP hold				

General Election 1984: Kim Keat
Party	Candidate	Votes	%	±%
PAP	Ong Teng Cheong	Unopposed		
Registered electors		20,439		▼1.6
PAP hold				

General Election 1988: Kim Keat
Party	Candidate	Votes	%	±%
PAP	Ong Teng Cheong	10,644	73.00	N/A
SDP	Md Shariff Bin Yahya	3,937	27.00	N/A
Majority		6,707	46	N/A
Registered electors		15,850		▼19.5
PAP hold				
