= People's Front (Singapore) =

- Chinese name: 人民阵线; Rénmín Zhènxiàn
- Malay name: Barisan Rakyat
- Founded: 21 May 1971
- Dissolved: c. 1977
- Split from: Barisan Sosialis

The People's Front (abbr. PF) was a short-lived Singaporean political party that was registered on 21 May 1971 where some members from a faction of Barisan Sosialis (BS) that was mostly Chinese-speaking had decided to resign from BS. However, their existence was only prominent in 1972 election because by November 1976, most of its members had instead chose to join Workers' Party where the 1976 general election was held in December 1976. Eventually after 1976 general election, the few remaining party members who participated had decided to join United Front instead, and the party was left dormant.

On 7 August 2025, the Singapore Ministry of Home Affairs sought proof of PF's existence along with 13 other political parties due to its failure to comply with the Foreign Interference (Countermeasures) Act 2021. If there is no proof of existence provided to the Singapore Government within 3 months, the Registrar of Societies will deem the party as officially defunct.
