= Jek Yeun Thong =

Singaporean politician

Jek Yeun Thong DUNU
- 易润堂
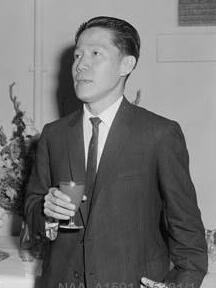
- Jek in 1964

Minister for Science and Technology
- In office 31 December 1976 – 25 September 1977
- Prime Minister: Lee Kuan Yew
- Preceded by: Lee Chiaw Meng
- Succeeded by: E. W. Barker

Minister for Culture
- In office 16 April 1968 – 25 September 1977
- Prime Minister: Lee Kuan Yew
- Preceded by: Othman Wok
- Succeeded by: Ong Teng Cheong (acting)

Minister for Labour
- In office 19 October 1963 – 15 April 1968
- Prime Minister: Lee Kuan Yew
- Preceded by: Ahmad Ibrahim
- Succeeded by: S. Rajaratnam

Member of the Singapore Parliament for Queenstown
- In office 21 September 1963 – 17 August 1988
- Preceded by: Lee Siew Choh
- Succeeded by: Chay Wai Chuen

Member of the Malaysian Parliament for Singapore
- In office 2 November 1963 – 9 August 1965
- Preceded by: Position established
- Succeeded by: Position abolished

Personal details
- Born: Jek Yeun Thong; 29 July 1930 Singapore, Straits Settlements, British Malaya
- Died: 3 June 2018 (aged 87) Singapore
- Party: People's Action Party
- Spouse: Huang Kek Chee
- Children: 2
- Occupation: Politician

Jek Yeun Thong (Note: Chinese: 易润堂; Jyutping: Jik^{6} Jeon^{6} Tong^{4}; pinyin: Yì Rùntáng) (29 July 1930 – 3 June 2018) was a Singaporean politician who served as Minister for Science and Technology between 1976 and 1977, Minister for Culture between 1968 and 1977 and Minister for Labour between 1963 and 1968.

== Political career ==
In 1955, Jek's foray into politics began when he assisted the People's Action Party (PAP) during the 1955 general election. He was appointed to the party's Central Executive Committee (CEC) as a political secretary in 1957. That same year, due to his communist beliefs, he was detained under the Internal Security Act by Lim Yew Hock's government.

He was eventually released and when the PAP formed the Government, he held the posts of Assistant Treasurer and then Treasurer on the Central Executive Committee of the PAP between 1959 and 1976. Apart from serving as the deputy chairman of the People's Association (PA), he also served as Minister of Culture for 12 years between 1968 and 1978.

Additionally, he also served as Minister for Science and Technology between 1976 and 1977. He is credited for being one of the 10 ministers who signed the Independence of Singapore Agreement in 1965.

Together with Lee Khoon Choy, Jek was appointed as the government representatives on the Joint-Government-University Liaison Committee in 1960 to reform Nanyang University.

Jek was considered as one of the 'Old Guard'—the first generation of leaders of independent Singapore.

One of his final major public appearances was at the National Day Parade of 2015 in remembrance of Lee Kuan Yew.

== Death ==
Jek died at home at the age of 87 on 3 June 2018. A private wake and funeral was held in accordance with his wishes. As a mark of respect, the government ordered the state flag on all government buildings to be flown at half-mast on 7 June 2018. Prime Minister Lee Hsien Loong, President Halimah Yacob and many other political figures in Singapore offered their condolences to Jek's family.

Jek was survived by his 84-year-old wife Huang Kek Chee, his two sons Kian Jin and Kian Yee (aged 59 and 55 respectively), and five grandchildren.

== Honours and awards ==
Jek was awarded the Second Class of the Order of Nila Utama in 1990.

== Bibliography ==
- Lam, Peng Er and Tan, Kevin (Ed.) (2000). Lee's lieutenants : Singapore's old guard. Singapore: Allen & Unwin. ISBN 1-86508-172-8
