= Othman Wok =

Singaporean politician

Othman Wok DUNU (Second Class)
- عثمان ووك
- Othman in 1966

Minister for Social Affairs
- In office 19 October 1963 – 30 June 1977
- President: Yusof Ishak; Benjamin Sheares
- Prime Minister: Lee Kuan Yew
- Preceded by: Position established
- Succeeded by: Ahmad Mattar

Minister for Culture
- In office 12 August 1965 – 15 April 1968
- President: Yusof Ishak
- Prime Minister: Lee Kuan Yew
- Preceded by: S. Rajaratnam
- Succeeded by: Jek Yeun Thong

Member of the Singapore Parliament for Pasir Panjang
- In office 21 September 1963 – 5 December 1980
- Preceded by: Tee Kim Leng
- Succeeded by: Abbas Abu Amin

Member of the Malaysian Parliament for Singapore
- In office 2 November 1963 – 9 August 1965
- Preceded by: Position established
- Succeeded by: Position abolished

Personal details
- Born: Othman bin Wok; 8 October 1924 Singapore, Straits Settlements
- Died: 17 April 2017 (aged 92) Singapore
- Party: People's Action Party
- Education: Raffles Institution
- Occupation: Politician; journalist

Othman bin Wok (Note: Jawi: عثمان بن ووك) (8 October 1924 – 17 April 2017) was a Singaporean statesman and diplomat. He served as Minister for Social Affairs from 1963 to 1977 and concurrently held the portfolio of Minister for Culture between 1965 and 1968. After retiring from politics, he was appointed Singapore's Ambassador to Indonesia and sat on the boards of both the Singapore Tourism Board and the Sentosa Development Corporation. Throughout his entire political career, he represented the constituency of Pasir Panjang.

Othman played a prominent role in Singapore's early post-colonial administration and is regarded as one of the country's founding fathers. He was among the earliest members of the People's Action Party (PAP) and was instrumental in consolidating support for the party among the Malay–Muslim community during a period of political uncertainty following independence. His leadership within the Cabinet and his efforts in promoting social cohesion, particularly in matters of minority representation and intercommunal relations, were viewed as critical to the development of an egalitarian and multiracial state. For his contributions to national development in the political, economic and social spheres, he was conferred the Order of Nila Utama (Second Class) in 1983 by then President Devan Nair. Beyond his ministerial appointments, Othman was known for his long-standing involvement in civil and community affairs. Othman died in 2017 at the age of 92.

== Early life ==
Othman was born on 8 October 1924 in Singapore, then part of the Straits Settlements, into a family of indigenous Orang Laut ancestry. His father, Wok Ahmad, was a school teacher who later became a principal. Othman began his formal education at Telok Blangah Malay School at the age of five, and subsequently attended Radin Mas English School followed by Raffles Institution (RI). During the Japanese occupation of Singapore between 1942 and 1945, his father enrolled him in a Japanese-run school, believing that this would protect him from conscription into the Imperial Japanese Army (IJA). This decision enabled Othman to acquire a working knowledge of the Japanese language.

His grandfather, a religious teacher, expressed strong objections to Wok Ahmad's decision to place Othman in English-medium institutions such as Radin Mas and RI. He feared that exposure to a secular and Westernised education might lead his grandson away from Islam and towards Christianity. Despite these concerns, Othman remained firmly committed to his faith throughout his life. He would later play a pivotal role in bridging the Malay–Muslim community with the newly established People's Action Party (PAP) government from the 1950s onwards. His example lent support to his father's conviction that proficiency in English and participation in mainstream national education were necessary foundations for progress, both for individuals and for the broader Malay community.

Othman himself adopted a similarly pragmatic stance in matters concerning education and religion. He did not share his grandfather's anxieties regarding the influence of English-language or mission schools. He permitted one of his daughters to enrol at the Catholic school CHIJ Katong Convent, confident that such an education would not compromise her religious convictions. In keeping with the family's approach, his daughter continued to receive Islamic religious instruction outside of school and remained a practising Muslim.

== Early career ==
Othman began his professional career with the local Malay-language newspaper, Utusan Melayu, where he was first employed as a clerk following the completion of his education. In 1946, he was offered the position of reporter by Yusof Ishak, the newspaper's founder, who would later become Singapore's first President. In 1950, Othman was awarded a Colonial Development Scholarship to pursue a Diploma in Journalism in London. Upon completing his studies, he returned to Singapore in 1951 and resumed work at Utusan Melayu, this time as a news editor.

Alongside his journalistic duties, Othman became increasingly involved in labour matters and was elected Honorary Secretary of the Singapore Printing Employees Union (SPEU). The union advocated for improved wages and working conditions within the printing industry. During this period, Othman met Lee Kuan Yew, who served as legal adviser to both Utusan Melayu and SPEU. This marked the beginning of a close and lasting friendship between the two men, which would later carry over into political life. Othman remained as news editor for six years until he was promoted to deputy editor in 1957.

== Political career ==
Days after the formation of the PAP in 1954, Othman joined the political party as his ideology of a national policy of multi-racialism was aligned with what the PAP sought to achieve. He took on the role of producing the party's Petir publication, and was a member of the bulletin's editorial board. In 1959, he was asked by the then legislative assembly member Ahmad Ibrahim to be the elected chairman of the PAP Geylang Serai/Tampines branch.

While Othman was unsuccessful in the 1959 Singaporean general election when contesting in Kampong Kembangan, he later won in Pasir Panjang during the 1963 Singaporean general election. Upon his election, he resigned from Utusan Melayu to devote himself fully to politics.

=== Minister ===
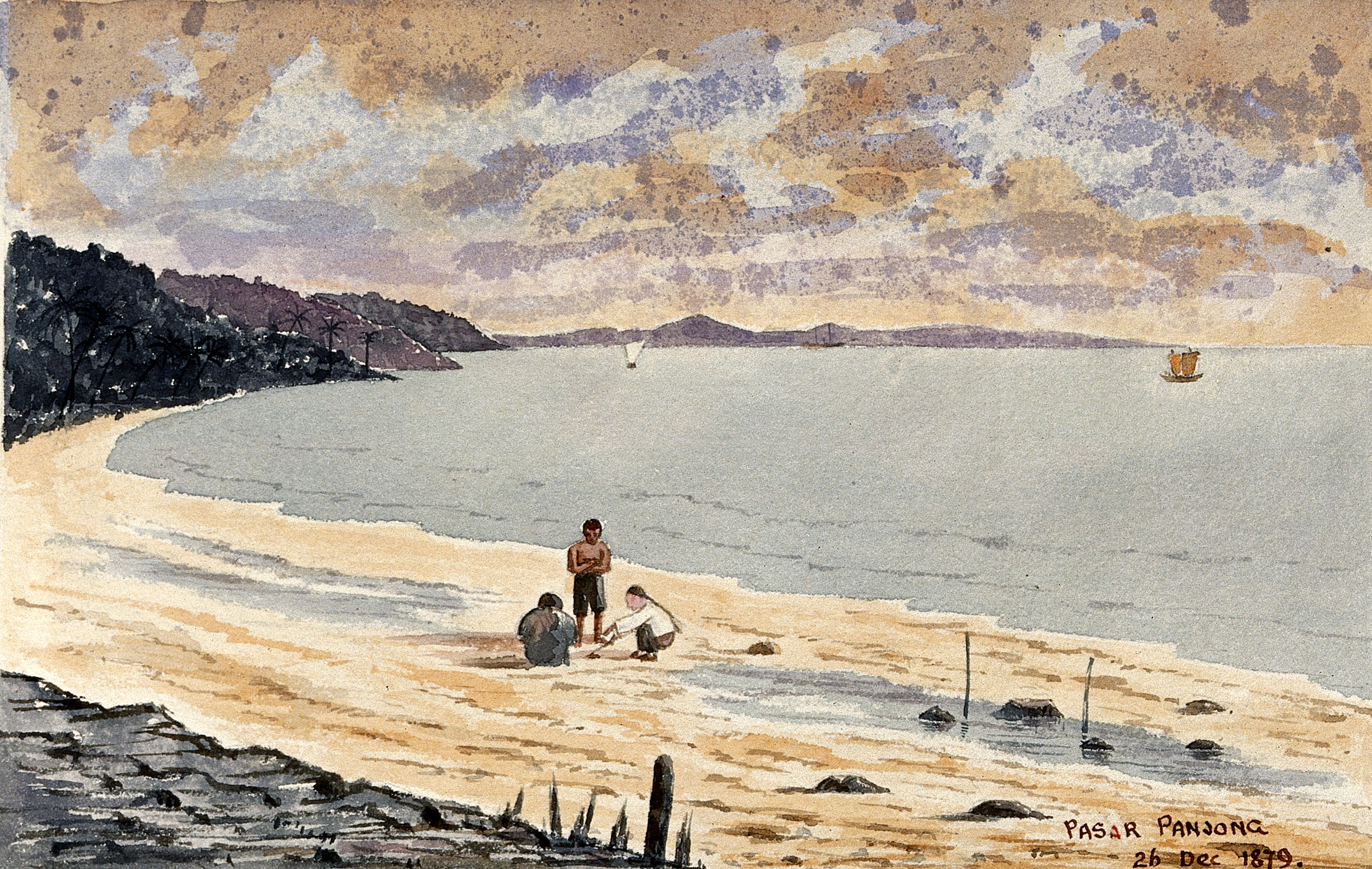
An 1879 watercolour painting of Pasir Panjang by John Edmund Taylor. Othman served as the area's political representative for 17 years from 1963 to 1980.

Othman became Singapore's first Minister for Social Affairs following his successful victory in 1963. At the time, he was the sole ethnic Malay member of the Cabinet and concurrently held the role of Director of the Malay Affairs Bureau. During his tenure, he introduced policies that left a lasting imprint on the Malay Singaporean community. Among his most significant contributions was the establishment of the Singapore Pilgrimage Office, which became the first formal system for registering Hajj pilgrims in the country. This administrative body provided an organised framework for pilgrimage activities and laid the institutional foundation that continues to support Hajj operations in Singapore today.

The Singapore Pilgrimage Office would later evolve into the Majlis Ugama Islam Singapura (MUIS), which today regulates Hajj arrangements and other affairs concerning the Muslim community. Othman also presided over the implementation of landmark initiatives such as the Administration of Muslim Law Act (AMLA) and the Mosque Building Fund (MBF), both introduced through the Ministry for Social Affairs. These policies contributed to the formalisation of Muslim personal law and facilitated the construction of mosques in housing estates to serve the needs of an expanding urban population. His leadership reflected a commitment to integrating religious administration within the broader framework of Singapore's civil institutions.

Othman's political career faced significant challenges. His alignment with the PAP drew criticism from segments of the Malay community, who at the time were being courted by the United Malays National Organisation (UMNO) in Kuala Lumpur, which promoted the ideology of Ketuanan Melayu or "Malay Supremacy". Some even labelled him a "race traitor" for choosing to support a secular and multiracial party.

Following Singapore's merger with Malaysia, Othman was nominated to be one of the few MPs to represent Singapore in the Dewan Rakyat, the lower house of the Parliament of Malaysia, serving from 2 November 1963 to 1 March 1964 and from 18 May 1964 to 9 August 1965, when that Parliament voted for Singapore's expulsion in a vote in a session from which Singapore's representatives were absent. He was one of nine ministers who signed the document of separation, doing so only after expressing concerns in dealing with the Malayan Communist Party (MCP) and receiving assurances from Lee Kuan Yew.

Othman retired from politics on 5 December 1980 when Parliament was dissolved on the same day for the general election held later that month.

=== Ambassador ===
Having served 14 years as Minister for Social Affairs, Othman was appointed to serve as Singapore’s ambassador to Indonesia in 1977, serving for three and a half years, but retained his ministerial position during his diplomatic posting, and also remained MP for Pasir Panjang.

== Post–political career ==
Othman continued to be active and served in the Presidential Council of Minority Rights as a permanent member. He was also appointed as a member of several companies' board of directors.

Year/Term	Appointment and Organisation
1981	Permanent Member, Presidential Council of Minority Rights.
1981–1994	Board Member, Singapore Tourist Promotion.
1981–1987	Board Member, Sentosa Development Corporation.
1981	Director, Overseas Investment Pte Ltd.
1982	Director, Overseas Investment Nominees Pte Ltd.
1983	Director, Bioheath International (S) Pte Ltd.
1987	Director, Autologous Blood Bank (S) Pte Ltd.
1988	Director, Utusan Melayu (S) Pte Ltd.
1989	Director of Sembawang Holdings.
1992	Director, Gainall Pte Ltd.
1993	Director, C. Thru Pte Ltd.
1994	Director, Property Services International.
1995	Director, Hale medical Clinic (Concourse) Pte Ltd.
1996	Director, Mindsets Pte Ltd.
1996	Director, Bright Steel Pte Ltd.
1996	Chairman, Lion Asiapac Ltd.

== Awards ==
- Order of Nila Utama (2nd Class, 1983)

== Personal life ==
Othman grew up in a humble family. In the first four years of his life, Othman lived with his uncle, together with his grandparents and parents in a kampong area dominated by Malays. He recounted that as a boy, different races lived together harmoniously, and he would have Chinese and Indian playmates whom he conversed with in Malay. In his mid-twenties, Othman went to London to receive further education in a polytechnic. Othman was married with four children. His hobbies included reading and writing ghost stories, one of his books being Malayan Horror: Macabre Tales of Singapore and Malaysia in the 50s, a compilation of stories written by him. Othman has also penned a biography in 2000 titled: "Never in my Wildest Dreams", as a memoir of his life experiences.

Othman was considered as one of the "Old Guard" – a founding father and the first generation of leaders of post-independent Singapore. Othman also completed military service (called National Service in Singapore) with the People's Defence Force in 1980, holding the rank of Major.

On 17 April 2017, he died at 12.22pm local time at the Singapore General Hospital due to poor health; he was 92. As per Islamic religious customs, there was no state funeral and he was buried at Choa Chu Kang Muslim Cemetery the next day.
