= Ch'ng Jit Koon =

Singaporean former politician (1934–2024)

Ch'ng Jit Koon DUBC
- 庄日昆
- Ch'ng in 1988

Member of Parliament for Tiong Bahru Single Member Constituency
- In office 6 May 1968 – 17 August 1988
- Preceded by: Lee Teck Him
- Succeeded by: Constituency abolished

Member of Parliament for Tiong Bahru Group Representation Constituency
- In office 9 January 1989 – 14 August 1991
- Preceded by: Constituency established
- Succeeded by: Constituency abolished

Member of Parliament for Bukit Merah Single Member Constituency
- In office 6 January 1992 – 16 December 1996
- Preceded by: Lim Chee Onn
- Succeeded by: Constituency abolished

Personal details
- Born: Ch'ng Jit Koon; 19 February 1934 Hui'an County, Fujian Province, Republic of China
- Died: 1 March 2024 (aged 90) Singapore
- Resting place: Siong Lim Temple
- Education: Nanyang University

Ch'ng Jit Koon (Note: Chinese: 庄日昆; Pe̍h-ōe-jī: Chng Ji̍t-khun; pinyin: Zhuāng Rìkūn) (19 February 1934 – 1 March 2024) was a Chinese-born Singaporean former politician. A member of the People's Action Party (PAP), he served as the Member of Parliament (MP) for Tiong Bahru Constituency from 1968 to 1988, the MP for Tiong Bahru Group Representation Constituency (GRC) from 1989 to 1991, and the MP for Bukit Merah Single Member Constituency (SMC) from 1992 to 1996.

Ch'ng also served as the Second Adviser to Tanjong Pagar Grassroots from 1975 to 1996 and served as Senior Minister of State for Community Development from 1985 to 1991. He also introduced ministerial walkabouts.

== Early life and education ==
Ch'ng Jit Koon was born in 1934 in Hui'an County, Quanzhou, China and moved to the Straits Settlements (present-day Singapore) in 1935. His father worked as an assistant manager. During the Japanese occupation, Ch'ng worked at a soap factory, preventing him from being drafted as a labourer for the Japanese.

Ch'ng was educated at Chung Cheng High School and Beatty Secondary School. Ch'ng got a Bachelor of Arts degree at Nanyang University and was also a member at the council at Nanyang University. He was also the treasurer of the Nanyang University and the chairman of Tanglin Technical Secondary School Advisory Committee.

== Career ==
Ch'ng made his political debut at the 1968 general election, contesting Tiong Bahru Constituency and was elected unopposed. In the 1972 general election, Ch'ng sought a second term for Tiong Bahru Constituency but was challenged by Seow Yong Chew from Workers' Party (WP) and Richard Lee Kah Chit from United National Front. He won with 75.62% of the vote.

In the 1976 general election, Ch'ng contested Tiong Bahru Constituency again and was challenged by Teo Kim Hoe from United People's Front, winning with 83.10% of the vote. In the 1980 and 1984 general elections, he remained as the MP for Tiong Bahru Constituency uncontested. Ch'ng also introduced ministerial walkabouts in 1984.

After the dissolution of Tiong Bahru Constituency, during the 1988 general election, he, along with Chng Hee Kok and S. Vasoo, contested Tiong Bahru GRC. They won with 57.84% of the vote against the WP's group of Low Thia Khiang, Lim Lye Soon, and Gopalan Nair.

In the 1991 general election, after the dissolution of Tiong Bahru Group Representation Constituency, Ch'ng contested for MP of Bukit Merah SMC against Gopalan Nair from WP and Independent Patrick Leong Siew Choong. He retired from politics in 1997 and worked at Keppel Finance as a board director.

== Personal life ==
In 2015, Ch'ng was awarded the Distinguished Service Order at the National Day Awards. Ch'ng's father suffered from tuberculosis in 1939 till his death in 1951.

On 1 March 2024, Ch'ng died at the age of 90.
