= Lai Weng Cheong =

Singaporean trade unionist and civil servant

Lai in 1974.

Lai Weng Cheong (Note: Chinese: 黎永昌; pinyin: Lí Yǒngchāng) (1939 or 1940 – 28 October 1984) was a Singaporean civil servant and trade unionist. He served as the Registrar of Vehicles and subsequently a member of the National Trades Union Congress (NTUC). He then served as the congress's secretary of administration and as the executive secretary of the Metal Industries Workers' Union. A member of the governing People's Action Party (PAP), he was announced as the party's candidate for Radin Mas Constituency in the 1984 general election. However, he was diagnosed with cancer shortly after and died before the election.

== Early life and education ==
Lai was educated at Yeung Ching Chinese School and Outram Primary School, and later at Raffles Institution. While ineligible for national service, he served for two years in the army (then the People's Defence Force), attaining the rank of second lieutenant. He studied at the now-defunct University of Singapore, from which he graduated with a Bachelor of Science (Honours) degree and a Second Class (Upper) Honours in February 1963.

== Career ==
From 1965 to 1966, Lai worked at St. Joseph's Institution as a teacher. In mid-April 1970, he was appointed to a newly-formed committee which was to review dail-rated employment in Government, the Public Utilities Board and the Housing and Development Board. He was then an assistant secretary at the Ministry of Finance. In this period, he also worked at the Prime Minister's Office. On 1 November 1973, Lai, the then-Registrar of Vehicles, was appointed to another new committee, led by Herman Ronald Hochstadt, formed to supervise bus services operated by SBS Transit. While the Registrar of Vehicles, he was involved in the organisation of the Keep Singapore Accident Free campaign, the first nation-wide road safety campaign in Singapore, which began in October 1974. He reportedly wrote 11 speeches for the campaign and "took to the dais himself on many occasions." Lai was appointed to the Bus Service Licensing Authority for two years on 1 September 1975. He was reappointed to the authority in 1977.

In May 1978, Lai was made the deputy secretary at the Ministry of Home Affairs; he was succeeded as Registrar of Vehicles by Victor Au Pui Chuan. The New Nation reported that Lai was "expected" to be transferred to an NTUC position. He was then a member of the board of directors of Comfort (now ComfortDelGro), NTUC's cooperative taxi and minibus service. Around that time, he had begun working with the Radin Mas Citizens' Consultative Committee (CCC). By June 1981, Lai had been appointed deputy director for organisation and management at NTUC. He was reappointed as the secretary of administration in July 1982. In September, he succeeded Lew Syn Pau as the executive secretary of the Metal Industries Workers' Union, then the "third largest offshoot" of the Pioneer Industries Employees Union-Singapore Industrial Labour Organisation.

In April 1984, Lai chaired a workshop, held at the PAP's headquarters, on Howe Yoon Chong's "controversial" Report on the Problems of the Aged. At the end of May, it was announced that Ho See Beng, the executive secretary of the Singapore Port Workers Union, was to resign, with Lai being likely to succeed him in the position within the next six months. He succeeded Ho on 1 July.

=== 1984 Singaporean general election ===
In February 1984, it was announced that Lai would contest in the upcoming general election. By then, he had become the chairman of the Radin Mas CCC, while also serving on the advisory committee of Blangah Rise Primary School. On 5 March, Lai claimed that he, if elected, would primarily focus on "[raising] the skills of workers" and "[bringing] unions and management closer together". He was to remain in NTUC while a Member of Parliament (MP). By April, he had begun sitting in Meet-the-People Sessions conducted by M. K. A. Jabbar, the incumbent MP for Radin Mas Constituency. In August, it was reported that Lai, who had been selected as the PAP candidate for Radin Mas, could be exiting the election on account of ill health. The Singapore Monitor reported later that month that he would likely exit in favour of Chng Hee Kok, who had previously been understudying in Kampong Glam Constituency. It was confirmed on 19 September that Lai would not stand for Parliament.

== Personal life and death ==
Lai was married with two children. He lived on Cavenagh Road, though his sister, who he visited regularly, lived in Radin Mas. In March 1984, when it was announced that he would contest the upcoming general election, Lai claimed that he expected to remain active for another 15 to 20 years. However, in July, he was diagnosed with liver cancer, despite which he continued his constituency work. After attending an opening ceremony, he was admitted to hospital, and subsequently remained "in and out of hospital" with worsening health until his death from cancer on 28 October.
