= Labour Day (Singapore) =

Public holiday, 1 May

- Observed by: Singapore
- Begins: 1 May
- Ends: 1 May
- Date: 1 May
- Next time: 1 May 2026
- Frequency: annual

In Singapore, May Day (or Labour Day) is celebrated on 1 May each year as a mark of solidarity amongst workers. The celebration of May Day as a public holiday began only in 1960 after the People's Action Party (PAP) came into power. Before then, only workers defined as such under the Labour Ordinance 1955 and those defined as industrial clerks under the Clerks Employment Ordinance 1957 were given paid holidays.

May Day is a day of special significance for organised workers, as it serves to remind others what their collective strength has achieved for workers. By making it a public holiday, the Government of Singapore had intended it to be a day set aside in honour of workers and their contributions to the country. It also makes it easier for workers to come together for celebrations.

In the past, rallies and resolutions also form the central features of May Day celebrations. Through these activities, organised workers symbolically express their unity of purpose and their faith in solidarity. Today, May Day celebrations are increasingly planned for the enjoyment of workers and their families, which include events like the May Day Family Fiesta.

== History of May Day ==
In the early days of Singapore, May Day rallies had the atmosphere of a persecuted sect preparing for another round of war. S. R. Nathan, then Minister of Labour in 1968, quoted that May Day rallies were intended as demonstrations of worker's strength and solidarity. Militant speeches and militant attitudes were necessary as this was a time when organised labour had to struggle against the colonial government.

As labour relations improved through the years, May Day presented an opportunity to celebrate the solidarity and the achievements of the democratic trade unions, and to rededicate worker's alignments to the ideal of a just society in which men are not exploited by their fellow men, and in which labour enjoys a fair share of the fruits of labour.

In the 1969 May Day message, Mr. Peter Vincent, President of the National Trades Union Congress (NTUC) stated that "May Day celebrations have undergone a change of character… less of an aggressive spirit, little or no slogan shouting and few or none of the grandiloquent resolutions. In its place there is harmony of outlook oriented towards the advancement of our developing economy".

== Milestones ==
=== May Day 1970 ===
This marked the start of the Singapore Trade Union Movement's "First Year of Development". Workers at the NTUC rally resolved to ensure the complete success of the movement's modernisation programme in the new era.

=== May Day 1971 ===
In cognisance of the coming of age of organised labour in Singapore, May Day was restored to its correct perspective of a festive occasion for commemorating the dignity of labour in 1971. A small rally was held on the eve of May Day to honour outstanding unions and officials. Three major functions were held on May Day for workers to enjoy themselves in the company of their families and friends.

=== May Day 1972 ===
This marked the end of wage restraint, and in many cases, of wage freeze for labour in Singapore. It also marked the beginning of the pay-off for the effort, discipline and restraint in the last few years. It was the beginning of a pay-off not only for labour but for the people of Singapore as a whole.

Starting from this May Day, it became an annual affair that the Labour Minister will announce the decision of the government with respect to the National Wages Council's recommendations for the year. However, in 1974, with the world caught up with the energy crisis, the National Wages Council, after presenting the interim recommendation in January, could not make the final recommendations in time for announcement on May Day.

=== May Day 1978 ===
The launch of the Singapore Labour Foundation in 1978 testified to the evolution and expansion of the role of the trade union movement. Trade unions evolved from one of mere concern with traditional collective bargaining to involvement in other socio-economic areas designed to further improve the welfare of our workers. This move made the Labour Movement (NTUC et al.) a co-driver of national agenda instead of merely a bargainer.

The Prime Minister in his May Day message recapitulated the anti-communist struggle in the early years. He was quoted, "Never must such a perilous situation as that which existed from 1945-1961 ever be allowed to occur. The duty of the Government and the NTUC is to create a series of overlapping and reinforcing organic links through which every worker identifies himself directly with the building of our young nation of which he is a part".

=== May Day 1979 ===
This year marked the 10th anniversary of NTUC’s modernisation seminar, which was the year to review and past and survey the future. In line with this, the major May Day resolution was the smooth and efficient transition from the old to the new. This was also the theme of the then Prime Minister’s message and Labour Minister’s address.

=== May Day 1980 ===
Lim Chee Onn, then Secretary-General of NTUC, considered May Day 1980 as a significant milestone in the history of Singapore’s labour movement’s development for two reasons. Firstly, it marked the beginning of a national effort to transform the country’s labour-intensive economy to one driven by middle-technology industries and a high-skilled labour force. Secondly, it signified the start of a plan by Singapore’s union movement to enhance the status of unionists.

Devan Nair, then President of NTUC, considered this May Day as an occasion to rally the Singapore youth, intensify their stake in the future of the nation and give them an appreciation of the basic social, economic and political priorities of the Republic.

=== May Day 1981 ===
From 1981, the task was to foster "greater team spirit at the work place and… the objective is higher productivity and upgraded economy to pay higher wages and benefits to all." Nair called on all Singaporeans to appreciate the vital importance of maximising their skills and performance.

=== May Day 1984–1985 ===
Productivity continued to be the resonating message from 1984 to 1985. In 1984, Ong Teng Cheong, Secretary-General of NTUC, called for a redefinition of the role of trade unions and the adoption of new concepts to strengthen the cohesiveness of workers in the company to raise productivity. With the slowdown of the economy in 1985, the call for higher productivity through harmonious labour management was again reiterated.

=== May Day 1986 ===
May Day 1986 marked the 25th anniversary of NTUC. In his message, Ong stated that tripartite cooperation has helped to achieve a standard of living for the people of Singapore rivalled by few in the Asian region. He called for the resolve to put the true spirit of tripartite cooperation between labour, management and the government to the test through the economic recession.

== Speaker and theme of speeches at May Day rallies ==
| Year | Speaker | Theme |
|---|---|---|
| 1960 | Mr Lee Kuan Yew, Prime Minister | The PAP government and the trade union movement |
| 1961 | Mr Lee Kuan Yew, Prime Minister | The PAP |
| 1963 | Mr Lee Kuan Yew, Prime Minister | The unity of the working class movement |
| 1964 | Dr Toh Chin Chye, Deputy Prime Minister | NTUC’s part in coordinating trade union activity throughout Malaysia |
| 1965 | Mr Lee Kuan Yew, Prime Minister | Power comes with responsibility |
| 1966 | Dr Toh Chin Chye, Deputy Prime Minister | Call for double efforts to boost productivity |
| 1967 | Dr Toh Chin Chye, Deputy Prime Minister | Problems posed by British military withdrawal |
| 1968 | Mr S Rajaratnam, Minister for Labour | The role of the trade union movement |
| 1969 | Mr S Rajaratnam, Minister for Labour | The trade union, new labour laws, employment and industrialisation |
| 1970 | Mr S Rajaratnam, Minister for Labour | Better times ahead |
| 1972 | Mr Ong Pang Boon, Minister for Labour | The national cake and the importance of increasing its size |
| 1973 | Mr Ong Pang Boon, Minister for Labour | Government agrees: 9%; goodwill and good sense must prevail |
| 1974 | Mr Ong Pang Boon, Minister for Labour | The spirit of responsible trade unionism |
| 1975 | Mr Ong Pang Boon, Minister for Labour | Economic development remains a national priority |
| 1976 | Mr Ong Pang Boon, Minister for Labour | Work together for Singapore's prosperity |
| 1977 | Mr Ong Pang Boon, Minister for Labour | The achievement of competitive cost is a tripartite affair |
| 1978 | Mr Ong Pang Boon, Minister for Labour | Tripartism in action |
| 1979 | Mr Ong Pang Boon, Minister for Labour | Trade union leadership |
| 1980 | Mr Ong Pang Boon, Minister for Labour | Restructuring our economy |
| 1981 | Mr Ong Teng Cheong, Minister for Labour | Greater team spirit at the work place |
| 1982 | Mr Ong Teng Cheong, Minister for Labour | Worker's welfare - an important productivity factor |
| 1983 | Mr Lee Kuan Yew, Prime Minister | NTUC needs self-renewal too; why house unions |
| 1984 | Mr Goh Chok Tong, Minister of Defence and Second Minister for Health | Keep Singapore flying on course |
| 1985 | Mr Goh Chok Tong, First Deputy Prime Minister | Bright future since our basics are right |
| 1986 | Mr Goh Chok Tong, First Deputy Prime Minister | Greater team spirit at the work place |
| 1987 | Mr Ong Teng Cheong, Second Deputy Prime Minister and Secretary General, NTUC | —N/a |
| 2004 | Mr. Goh Chok Tong, Prime Minister | Singapore’s core strengths: fighting spirit, unity and nimbleness, and adaptability |
| 2005 | Mr. Lee Hsien Loong, Prime Minister | Continue to strengthen tripartite relationship, tackle our challenges and make Singapore a small but special country |
| 2006 | Mr. Lee Hsien Loong, Prime Minister | Together a bright future for all |
| 2007 | Mr. Lee Hsien Loong, Prime Minister | Keep Singapore special and unique through creating prosperity for a new generation of Singaporeans |
| 2008 | Mr. Lee Hsien Loong, Prime Minister | Living the Singapore story – growth for the country, investing in our people and thinking long-term |
| 2009 | Mr. Lee Hsien Loong, Prime Minister | Singaporeans need to stand together to ride out the economic uncertainties |
| 2010 | Mr. Lee Hsien Loong, Prime Minister | Singapore’s long-term strategy and the importance of raising productivity |
| 2011 | Mr. Lee Hsien Loong, Prime Minister | Celebrating 50 years of NTUC: U & Me signifying the strong and indelible bond that the labour movement has forged with union members and workers of Singapore |
| 2012 | Mr. Lee Hsien Loong, Prime Minister | To build an inclusive society and share the fruits of growth with every Singaporean |
| 2019 | Mr. Heng Swee Keat, Deputy Prime Minister | Celebrating 200 years of Singapore History & Pioneer Generation |
| 2020 | Mr. Lee Hsien Long, Prime Minister | COVID-19's impact on Singapore's workers, economy and the road ahead |
| 2021 | Mr. Lee Hsien Long, Prime Minister | Strengthening the partnership, and building a brighter future for Singapore for the next 60 years and beyond |
| 2022 | Mr. Lee Hsien Long, Prime Minister | The imperative to move forward, to renew, to endure and to transform ourselves has never been stronger |
| 2023/2025 | Mr. Lawrence Wong, Deputy Prime Minister | The volatile external environment, geopolitical tensions, and the risk of recession in the West |

== See also ==
- Labour movement of Singapore
