= Bukit Merah Single Member Constituency =

Former electoral division in Singapore

Coordinates: 1.287°N 103.818°E

Bukit Merah
- Former Single Member constituency for the Parliament of Singapore
- Region: Singapore

Former constituency
- Created: 1959
- Abolished: 1997
- Seats: 1
- Party: People's Action Party
- Member: Ch'ng Jit Koon
- Town Council: Tanjong Pagar
- Replaced by: Tanjong Pagar GRC

Bukit Merah Single Member Constituency was a constituency in Singapore. It existed from 1959 to 1997, when it was merged with Leng Kee division of the Tanjong Pagar GRC.

== History ==
Bukit Merah Constituency was formed in 1959.

On 31 December 1965, Lim Huan Boon resigned his Bukit Merah Constituency seat as he did not support BS boycotting parliament. By-election nominations were called for Bukit Merah on 8 January.

On 13 February 1977, Lim Guan Hoo suffered from a stroke and collapsed whilst watching the Vigilante Corps performing at the National Stadium. He was sent to the Singapore General Hospital where he stayed there in a coma for 172 days, dying on 3 August at 2:40 am.

His seat was vacated on 30 June 1977 and an by-election was called, the second by-election of the year similarly following the death of N. Naidu Govindasmy, the incumbent MP of Radin Mas Constituency. Similar to the earlier by-election for Radin Mas Constituency, opposition parties negotiated to avoid a multi-cornered contest with Lee Siew Choh of the Barisan Sosialis contesting the by-election. The PAP fielded civilist Lim Chee Oon to defend the seat. Lim was elected as MP in the by-election.

In 1988, following the establishment of group representation constituency (GRC) and single member constituency (SMC), it was known as Bukit Merah Single Member Constituency.

== Member of Parliament ==
Year	Member	Party
Formation
Legislative Assembly of Singapore
1959	Sellappa Ramaswamy	PAP
1963	Lim Huan Boon	BS
Parliament of Singapore
1966	Lim Guan Hoo	PAP
1968	Lim Guan Hoo	PAP
1972	Lim Guan Hoo	PAP
1976	Lim Guan Hoo	PAP
1977	Lim Chee Onn	PAP
1980	Lim Chee Onn	PAP
1984	Lim Chee Onn	PAP
1988	Lim Chee Onn	PAP
1991	Ch'ng Jit Koon	PAP
Constituency abolished (1997)

== Electoral results ==
Note: The Elections Department does not include rejected votes when calculating the vote shares of candidates. Hence, all candidates' vote shares will total to 100% at any given election (may not appear so in multi-way contests due to rounding).

=== Elections in 1950s ===
General Election 1959
Party	Candidate	Votes	%
PAP	Sellappa Ramaswamy	5,922	59.09
SPA	Teo Cheng Hye	3,026	30.20
Independent	Lee Choon Eng	1,073	10.71
Majority		2,896	28.89
Total valid votes		10,021	98.77
Rejected ballots		125	1.23
Turnout		10,146	88.79
Registered electors		11,286	
PAP win (new seat)			

=== Elections in 1960s ===
General Election 1963
Party	Candidate	Votes	%	±%
BS	Lim Huan Boon	4,963	42.84	N/A
PAP	Sellappa Ramaswamy	4,520	39.02	▼20.07
UPP	Poon Weng Ying	1,129	9.75	N/A
SA	Shums Tung Tao Chang	740	6.39	▼23.81
Independent	Ngoh Eng Kok	232	2.00	N/A
Majority		443	3.82	▼25.07
Total valid votes		11,584	99.06	▲0.29
Rejected ballots		110	0.94	▼0.29
Turnout		11,694	95.66	▲6.87
Registered electors		12,225		▲8.32
BS gain from PAP		Swing	▲42.84	

By-election 18 January 1966
Party	Candidate	Votes	%	±%
PAP	Lim Guan Hoo	9,082	82.94	▲43.92
Independent	Madai Puthan Damodaran Nair	1,868	17.06	N/A
Majority		7,214	65.88	▲62.06
Total valid votes		10,950	96.51	▼2.55
Rejected ballots		396	3.49	▲2.55
Turnout		11,346	84.11	▼11.55
Registered electors		13,489		▲10.34
PAP gain from BS		Swing	▲43.92	

General Election 1968
Party	Candidate	Votes	%	±%
PAP	Lim Guan Hoo	Unopposed		
Registered electors		19,319		▲43.22
PAP hold				

=== Elections in 1970s ===
General Election 1972
Party	Candidate	Votes	%	±%
PAP	Lim Guan Hoo	9,044	69.33	N/A
WP	Kho Jiak Hong	2,042	15.65	N/A
BS	Said bin Jali	1,958	15.02	N/A
Majority		7,002	53.68	N/A
Total valid votes		13,044	98.33	N/A
Rejected ballots		221	1.67	N/A
Turnout		13,265	95.02	N/A
Registered electors		13,960		▼27.74
PAP hold				

General Election 1976
Party	Candidate	Votes	%	±%
PAP	Lim Guan Hoo	12,775	76.37	▲7.04
UF	Wong Kui Yu	3,952	23.63	N/A
Majority		8,823	52.74	▼0.94
Total valid votes		16,727	98.43	▲0.10
Rejected ballots		267	1.57	▼0.10
Turnout		16,994	96.90	▲1.88
Registered electors		17,538		▲25.63
PAP hold		Swing	▲7.04	

By-election, 23 July 1977
Party	Candidate	Votes	%	±%
PAP	Lim Chee Onn	11,625	72.21	▼4.16
BS	Lee Siew Choh	4,473	27.79	N/A
Majority		7,152	44.42	▼8.32
Total valid votes		16,098	97.67	▼0.76
Rejected ballots		384	2.33	▲0.76
Turnout		16,482	97.31	▲0.41
Registered electors		16,937		▼3.43
PAP hold		Swing	▼4.16	

=== Elections in 1980s ===
General Election 1980
Party	Candidate	Votes	%	±%
PAP	Lim Chee Onn	Unopposed		
Registered electors		19,046		▲12.45
PAP hold				

General Election 1984
Party	Candidate	Votes	%	±%
PAP	Lim Chee Onn	Unopposed		
Registered electors		19,210		▲0.86
PAP hold				

General Election 1988
Party	Candidate	Votes	%	±%
PAP	Lim Chee Onn	9,414	69.78	N/A
WP	Pok Lee Chuen	4,077	30.22	N/A
Majority		5,337	39.56	N/A
Total valid votes		13,491	98.32	N/A
Rejected ballots		230	1.68	N/A
Turnout		13,721	93.19	N/A
Registered electors		14,723		▼23.36
PAP hold				

=== Elections in 1990s ===
General Election 1991
Party	Candidate	Votes	%	±%
PAP	Ch'ng Jit Koon	6,878	61.94	▼7.84
WP	Gopalan Nair Pallichadath	4,046	36.43	▲6.21
Independent	Patrick Leong Siew Choong	181	1.63	N/A
Majority		2,832	25.51	▼14.05
Total valid votes		11,105	98.29	▼0.03
Rejected ballots		193	1.71	▲0.03
Turnout		11,298	94.16	▲0.97
Registered electors		11,998		▼18.51
PAP hold		Swing	▼7.84	
