= Bernard Chen =

Singaporean politician (1942–2015)

Bernard Chen BBM
- 陈天立
- Chen in 1982

Member of the Singapore Parliament for West Coast GRC
- In office 2 January 1997 – 18 October 2001
- Preceded by: Constituency established
- Succeeded by: PAP held

Member of the Singapore Parliament for Brickworks GRC
- In office 6 January 1992 – 16 December 1996
- Preceded by: PAP held
- Succeeded by: Constituency abolished

Member of the Singapore Parliament for Pasir Panjang GRC
- In office 9 January 1989 – 14 August 1991
- Preceded by: Constituency established
- Succeeded by: Constituency abolished

Member of the Singapore Parliament for Clementi
- In office 3 February 1981 – 17 August 1988
- Preceded by: Constituency established
- Succeeded by: Constituency abolished

Member of the Singapore Parliament for Radin Mas
- In office 14 May 1977 – 5 December 1980
- Preceded by: N. Govindasmy
- Succeeded by: M. K. A. Jabbar

Personal details
- Born: Bernard Chen Tien Lap; 20 September 1942 Kunming, Republic of China
- Died: 8 April 2015 (aged 72) Assisi Hospice, Singapore
- Spouse: Louisa Chee Ling Chun (m. 1969)
- Children: 3
- Education: Harvard University (MPA); Australian Catholic University (BA); University of Alberta (BS)

Bernard Chen Tien Lap (Note: Chinese: 陈天立; Jyutping: Can^{4} Tin^{1} Lap^{6}; pinyin: Chén Tiānlì) BBM (20 September 1942 – 8 April 2015) was a Singaporean politician and business executive who served as Minister of State for Defence from 1977 to 1981, and a Member of Parliament (MP) from 1977 to 2001. He was a member of the governing People's Action Party (PAP).

Prior to entering politics, Chen worked in the Economic Development Board and the Ministry of Finance. He was also chairman of NTUC Income from 1978 to 1990.

A Catholic, Chen was married and had three children. He died of cancer in 2015.

== Early life and education ==
Bernard Chen Tien Lap was born on 20 September 1942 in Kunming, then part of the Republic of China. He had a younger brother and sister, three half-brothers and a half-sister. One of his half-brothers was Kenneth Chen Koon Lap, a future PAP activist.

Chen's father, Chen Li Kang, was educated at Lingnan University and obtained a degree in factual economics from the University of Pennsylvania. He worked in the administration of Chinese railways. Chen's mother was a housewife and the second wife of her husband. The couple married in Rangoon, Burma, (Note: Now Yangon, Myanmar.) before moving to Kunming.

To escape the Second Sino-Japanese War, Chen and his family moved to Calcutta, India. In 1946, they moved to British Hong Kong. Chen received his early education at All Saints Boys' School.

In 1956, Chen moved to Singapore via a cargo liner, together with his parents and brothers. He studied at Saint Anthony's Boys' School (Note: Now known as St. Anthony's Primary School.) along Victoria Street. In 1959, he went to St. Joseph's Institution, and obtained a Senior Cambridge.

In 1963, Chen attended a scholarship interview by the Public Service Commission (PSC) and received a Colombo Plan scholarship to study chemical engineering at the University of Alberta. During his final semester, he was awarded a scholarship by the university and the National Research Council Canada to pursue a Doctor of Philosophy in chemical engineering. His professor and the dean wrote to the PSC, requesting for Chen to continue with the doctorate. The PSC rejected the request, and Chen returned to Singapore in 1967.

In 1971, Chen was awarded the Edward Mason Fellowship to Harvard University, where obtained a Master of Public Administration.

Chen attended Australian Catholic University and studied theology. In 2000, he obtained a Bachelor of Arts.

== Career ==
=== Civil career ===
In 1967, Chen joined the Economic Development Board (EDB) as an investment project officer, in charge of helping businesses set up operations. This included finding suitable factory sites by negotiating with JTC Corporation, and to communicate the businesses' issues with other government departments. In 1969, Chen began serving part-time national service in the Singapore Police Force, and was later appointed by Goh Yong Hong to be in the Special Constabulary Research Unit, to provide recommendations on existing rules.

In 1970, Chen was transferred to the Ministry of Finance, working in the budget development division. Chen was involved the planning of the Pan Island Expressway, and the redevelopment of the Singapore General Hospital.

After returning from Harvard in 1973, Chen was promoted to director of economic planning. In December 1974, he was appointed as executive secretary of the Economic Activation Committee, chaired by Sim Kee Boon. The committee looked at inter-ministerial inefficiencies, and recommended measures to speed up progress of EDB-related industrial projects.

In 1975, Chen was promoted to deputy secretary. In March 1976, he was appointed to lead the Establishment Unit, which was set up by the Prime Minister's Office. The unit looked for civil servants with "outstanding ability and administrative talent" to take on different postings, and accelerate their promotions to superscale grades.

=== Political career ===
In early 1977, Chen was invited by Howe Yoon Chong to join the People's Action Party (PAP). In late April 1977, he resigned from the civil service and joined PAP.

During the 1977 by-elections, Chen stood as a candidate in Radin Mas Constituency, and the opposition candidate was J. B. Jeyaretnam from the Workers' Party (WP). He promised that if elected, a community centre will be built, and that there will be more kindergarten classes, cultural and sports activities. During a rally, Prime Minister Lee Kuan Yew endorsed Chen, and said that he was "an outstanding officer while in Civil Service". Chen won the election with 70.6% of the votes.

==== 4th Parliament (1977–1980) ====
On 14 May 1977, Chen was elected to the 4th Parliament. On 24 May 1977, he was appointed as minister of state for defence. In November 1977, Chen said that kindergartens should prevent children from losing interest in school by not giving too much work, and emphasised that kindergarten education is important for children. In December 1977, during a commissioning parade of the People's Defence Force, Chen said that the quality of the army is based on the morale among personnel, and not solely on the sophistication of its assets.

In March 1978, during an interview by New Nation, Chen said that he has fulfilled his election promises, and cited an example of new tuition classes for primary school students. On 22 July 1978, Chen officiated the opening of Radin Mas Community Club. In October 1978, he announced a S$10,000 renovation to the void deck of Block 134 Jalan Bukit Merah, to build facilities for sewing and cookery classes, a games room and a study room. On 22 July 1979, Chen officiated the opening of this sub-centre. On 28 July 1979, he announced that the Air Engineering Training Institute of the Republic of Singapore Air Force will be expanded to meet the needs of the air force, and its training syllabi will be updated to be more relevant.

In September 1979, Chen was picked by Goh Keng Swee to be part of the moral education committee, which had two ministry officials and six parliamentarians. (Note: The two ministry officials were namely Low Puk Yeong, and Tan Song Huat. The four other parliamentarians were namely, S. Dhanabalan, Lim Chee Onn, Ow Chin Hock, and Chin Harn Tong.) Chaired by Ong Teng Cheong, the committee looked at the current moral education programme taught in schools and made recommendations for an improved syllabi. Chen recommended Reverend Robert Balhetchet to prepare the syllabi and teaching materials.

In February 1980, Chen commissioned two Lockheed C-130 Hercules, bought by the Ministry of Defence (MINDEF) and used by 122 Squadron. In June 1980, he was appointed to a five-man task force (Note: Chaired by Goh Keng Swee, the other members were system engineers, namely, Pek Tiong Boon, William Hioe, and Wong Seng Hon.) to study the Ministry of Home Affairs and the Singapore Police Force. The existence of the task force was initially denied by officials, and the task force's objectives were not publicly stated. In August 1980, Chen announced a scheme that promoted reservists to higher ranks, provided that these individuals were successful in civilian life. As such, in October 1980, he announced the promotion of 79 reservists—six were promoted to major, and the remaining 73 were promoted to captain.

In preparation for the 1980 general election, Chen was appointed as the second secretary of the PAP election committee. He was a candidate in the newly created Clementi Constituency, and the opposition candidate was Munjeet Singh from United People's Front. During a rally, Chen said that "PAP is running a strong ship of refined steel", unlike the opposition parties. Chen won the election with 85.42% of the votes.

==== 5th Parliament (1981–1984) ====
Chen was elected to the 5th Parliament, and he remained as minister of state for defence. Later, Chen was told by Goh Chok Tong that Prime Minister Lee regarded him as a "very good Minister of State", but he was unlikely to become a minister. As such, in April 1981, Chen stepped down as Minister of State for Defence.

During a parliamentary debate regarding the proposed Mass Rapid Transit (MRT) system, Chen questioned the need for MRT, when other countries continued to have traffic congestions despite having an MRT system built. He felt that the funds should be used to improve bus infrastructure, and to purchase more rolling stock.

On 29 July 1982, Chen officiated the opening of Clementi Town Secondary School. In February 1984, he was appointed to a select committee to look at changes to the Companies Act. During the 1984 general election, Chen was the sole candidate in Clementi, and he was elected unopposed.

==== 6th Parliament (1984–1988) ====
On 25 February 1985, Chen was sworn into the 6th Parliament. In June 1985, he was appointed to the Committee of Privileges. In December 1985, Chen was also appointed as chairman of the PAP Suburban West district committee.

In February 1986, in response to recommendations of the economic committee, Chen said that the government should follow the recommendations fully and quickly, to re-establish confidence in Singapore's economy. In May 1986, he was appointed again to a select committee to examine amendments to the Companies Act.

In February 1987, Chen was appointed as chairman of a government parliamentary committee (GPC) examining the Ministry of Home Affairs. In March 1988, Chen urged the government to review existing legislation more frequently to "ensure that the law always stays ahead of criminals", and "to maintain the low crime rate" in Singapore.

For the 1988 general election, Chen was one of the three PAP candidates (Note: Namely, Abbas Abu Amin and Wan Soon Bee.) contesting in Pasir Panjang Group Representation Constituency, against the WP. Chen and his team won the election with 61.57% of the votes.

==== 7th Parliament (1989–1991) ====
Chen replaced Augustine Tan as chairman of the GPC examining the Ministry of Finance (MOF) and the Ministry of Trade and Industry (MTI). On 9 January 1989, Chen was sworn into the 7th Parliament. In March 1989, he said that the public sector should implement performance-based salary, similar to private companies. Chen felt that by doing this, the government can retain more public servants. In December 1990, Chen stepped down as chairman of the GPC, and he was succeeded by S. Chandra Das.

During the 1991 general election, Chen was a one of the four PAP candidates (Note: Namely, Ahmad Mattar, Chay Wai Chuen, and Wan Soon Bee.) in Brickworks Group Representation Constituency. The team was elected unopposed. In November 1991, in preparation of the first parliament sitting, Chen was appointed as chairman of the GPC for MOF and MTI. However, in December 1991, he was swapped with Peter Sung to head the GPC for MINDEF and the Ministry of Foreign Affairs.

==== 8th Parliament (1992–1996) ====
On 6 January 1992, Chen was sworn into the 8th Parliament. On 27 February 1992, he was appointed as chairman of public accounts committee, which examines public expenditure. The committee looked at 31 cases referred by the Auditor General's Office. In a report released in December 1996, the committee found lack of governance in some ministries and statutory boards.

==== 9th Parliament (1997–2001) ====
For the 1997 general election, Chen was one of the four PAP candidates (Note: Namely, S. Iswaran, Lim Hng Kiang, and Wan Soon Bee.) in West Coast Group Representation Constituency, and the opposition party was WP. PAP won the election with 70.14% of the votes.

In February 1997, Chen was appointed as a board director of the Singapore Labour Foundation. In March 1997, he was appointed as the coordinating chairman for all GPCs, and the GPC chairman for the Ministry of Health. In an interview with The Straits Times, Chen felt that GPCs will experience many new complex issues. He said:

In other aspects, the issues of policies are getting to be more and more complicated, not only in terms of scope, but also depth. The issues are pretty difficult ones to resolve, which probably calls for more serious consideration.
It is like climbing a mountain. We have climbed the first 10,000 feet. Now, we are scaling the next 10,000. We need oxygen. It is no more plain sailing.

On 26 May 1997, Chen was sworn into the 9th Parliament.

Chen stepped down in 2001. Chen represented the outgoing MPs during a farewell dinner organised by PAP.

=== Business ===
In February 1978, Chen was appointed as chairman of NTUC Income.

In February 1981, Chen was introduced by Howe Yoon Chong to Tan Chin Tuan, chairman of Fraser and Neave (F&N) and OCBC Bank. In May 1981, Chen became a senior consultant for OCBC. During this period, F&N was restructuring to become two separate businesses—alcohol and soft drinks. Being allergic to alcohol, Chen was appointed as general manager of F&N in November 1981, while Tan Yam Pin was in charge of Malayan Breweries. On 1 April 1984, Chen was promoted to group general manager, and appointed as a board director.

On 17 June 1985, Chen announced that Diet Coke will be produced in F&N's bottling plant in Malaysia, and will be available in Singapore by the end of 1985. On 2 July 1986, Chen announced that F&N terminated ties with Philip Morris, which owned the rights to 7 Up. As such, F&N stopped producing 7 Up and started producing Sprite instead.

On 1 September 1990, Chen stepped down as chairman of NTUC Income, and he was succeeded by Ng Pock Too. On 20 August 1991, Chen left F&N. In September 1991, he joined Intraco as its chief executive officer. (Note: Listed on the Singapore Exchange as I06.)

On 1 April 1996, Chen was appointed as a board director to DBS Bank. In February 1997, he became the bank's audit committee chairman.

On 1 October 2000, Chen resigned from Intraco, and joined Certis Cisco as its chairman. In April 2003, he was appointed as chairman of SingHealth. In April 2005, Chen resigned from DBS Bank.

In April 2009, Chen resigned from SingHealth, and was succeeded by Peter Seah Lim Huat.

== Personal life ==
Chen was Catholic. In 1969, Chen married Louisa Chee Ling Chun, and they had a daughter and two sons. In 1972, Chen's first son was born with encephalitis, underwent surgery to remove the mass, and died 10 years later.

In November 2014, cancer was detected in Chen's left kidney and bladder. He did not respond to chemotherapy. On 8 April 2015, Chen died at 01:38 SST at the Assisi Hospice. Prime Minister Lee Hsien Loong described Chen as a "grounded, hardworking and humble man".

== Awards and decorations ==
- Bintang Bakti Masyarakat, in 2008.

== Notes ==
Parliament of Singapore
Preceded by N. Govindasmy	Member of Parliament for Radin Mas; 1977–1980	Succeeded by M. K. A. Jabbar
New constituency	Member of Parliament for Clementi; 1981–1988	Constituency abolished
New constituency	Member of Parliament for Pasir Panjang GRC; 1989–1991; Served alongside: Abbas Abu Amin, Wan Soon Bee	Constituency abolished
Preceded by Tan Soo Khoon; Ahmad Mattar; Chay Wai Chuen	Member of Parliament for Brickworks GRC; 1992–1996; Served alongside: Ahmad Mattar, Chay Wai Chuen, Wan Soon Bee	Constituency abolished
New constituency	Member of Parliament for West Coast GRC; 1997–2001; Served alongside: S. Iswaran, Lim Hng Kiang, Wan Soon Bee	Succeeded by Ho Geok Choo; Arthur Fong; Cedric Foo; Lim Hng Kiang; S. Iswaran
