= K. Thanaletchimi =

Singaporean politician

K. Thanaletchimi (born 1966) is a Singaporean politician and trade unionist who was a Nominated Member of Parliament of Singapore from 24 March 2016 to 21 September 2018.

== Education ==
K. Thanaletchimi first obtained a bachelor's degree of Science (Honours) at the University of Bradford, United Kingdom. She later obtained her master's degree in Health Science Management at the University of Sydney, Australia.

== Career ==
=== Healthcare career ===
Thanaletchimi is a senior assistant manager in the pharmacy field and has been serving the public healthcare sector for at least 26 years.

=== Labour Union ===
Thanaletchimi is the current president of the Healthcare Services Employees Union (HSEU) after being elected to the position in 1998 and is also an elected member of the National Trades Union Congress (NTUC) Central Committee. She is also the Chairperson for the NTUC Women's Committee, the Labour Movement's Healthcare Cluster and the NTUC Membership Committee.

=== Nominated Member of Parliament ===
In March 2016, Thanaletchimi was one of 9 individuals out of the 41 nominations selected by the Special Select Committee to take on the role of Nominated members of parliament in the 13th Parliament of Singapore after being nominated by the Labour movement of Singapore.

In Parliament, Thanaletchimi has spoken frequently on issues concerning women workforce participation, skills ladders for career progression in the healthcare industry and gender equality in work environments.

=== Public service ===
Thanaletchimi is currently a member of the MediShield Life Council at the Ministry of Health, Board of Management at the People's Association, the Tripartite Alliance for Fair Employment Practice (TAFEP) and the Essential Domestic Services Subcommittee at the Future Economy Council. She has also been involved in various tripartite committees such as the National Wages Council (in 2006) and the National Integration Workplace Group (since 2010). She was also a member of the REACH Supervisory Panel from 2005 to 2010. She was later appointed as a member of the Workplace Seafety and Health Institute Governing Board in 2012.

== Achievements ==
In recognition of her dedication and continued efforts in the healthcare sector and labour union, Thanaletchimi was awarded the National Day Efficiency Award in 2002, as well as the NTUC Comrade of Labour Award in 2006.
