= Radin Mas Constituency =

Former electoral division in Singapore

Coordinates: 1.276°N 103.825°E

Radin Mas
- Former constituency for the Parliament of Singapore
- Electorate: 19,770

Former constituency
- Created: 1976; 50 years ago
- Abolished: 1988; 38 years ago
- Seats: 1
- Replaced by: Tiong Bahru GRC

The Radin Mas Constituency was a constituency in Singapore. It existed from 1976 to 1988.

== History ==
The constituency was created prior to the 1976 general election; Govindasamy Naidu, the candidate for the governing People's Action Party (PAP), defeated Othman bin Abdullah from the Workers' Party (WP) with 75.65% of the vote.

In 1977, a by-election was called after Naidu died in office. Bernard Chen retained the constituency for the PAP, defeating J. B. Jeyaretnam, the secretary-general of the WP, with 70.59% of the vote. Syed Abu Bakar Alsagoff, an independent, had also attempted to contest the by-election; however, having not voted during the 1976 general election, he was disqualified after the end of nominations for being absent from the registers of electors.

During the 1980 general election, PAP candidate Mohamed Kassim Abdul Jabbar defeated WP candidate Wong Hong Toy with 64.07% of the vote. In the leadup to the 1984 general election, Lai Weng Cheong was announced as the PAP candidate but withdrew due to illness; he died of liver cancer on 30 October. He was replaced by Chng Hee Kok, who defeated Wong with 53.78% of the vote.

Prior to the 1988 general election, with the creation of group representation constituencies (GRCs), Radin Mas Constituency was abolished and made part of the three-member Tiong Bahru GRC.

== Members of Parliament ==
Year	Member	Party
Formation
1976	N. Naidu Govindasmy	PAP
1977	Bernard Chen	PAP
1980	Mohamed Kassim Abdul Jabbar	PAP
1984	Chng Hee Kok	PAP
Constituency abolished (1988)

== Electoral results ==
Note: The Elections Department does not include rejected votes when calculating the vote shares of candidates. Hence, all candidates' vote shares will total to 100% at any given election (may not appear so in multi-way contests due to rounding).

=== Elections in 1970s ===
General Election 1976
Party	Candidate	Votes	%
PAP	N. Naidu Govindasmy	13,246	75.65
WP	Othman bin Abdullah	4,263	24.35
Majority		8,983	51.3
Total valid votes		17,509	97.93
Rejected ballots		370	2.07
Turnout		17,879	97.07
Registered electors		18,418	
PAP win (new seat)			

By-election 1977
Party	Candidate	Votes	%	±%
PAP	Bernard Chen	12,053	70.59	▼5.06
WP	J. B. Jeyaretnam	5,021	29.41	▲5.06
Majority		7,032	41.18	▼10.12
Total valid votes		17,074	98.04	▲0.11
Rejected ballots		341	1.96	▼0.11
Turnout		17,415	97.40	▲0.33
Registered electors		17,879		▼2.93
PAP hold		Swing	▼5.06	

=== Elections in 1980s ===
General Election 1980
Party	Candidate	Votes	%	±%
PAP	Mohamed Kassim Abdul Jabbar	11,335	64.07	▼6.52
WP	Wong Hong Toy	6,356	35.93	▲6.52
Majority		4,979	28.14	▼13.04
Total valid votes		17,871	98.65	▲0.61
Rejected ballots		244	1.35	▼0.61
Turnout		18,115	96.08	▼1.32
Registered electors		18,854		▲4.08
PAP hold		Swing	▼6.52	

General Election 1984
Party	Candidate	Votes	%	±%
PAP	Chng Hee Kok	9,997	53.78	▼10.29
WP	Wong Hong Toy	8,519	46.22	▲10.29
Majority		1,478	7.56	▼20.58
Total valid votes		18,516	98.25	▼0.40
Rejected ballots		330	1.75	▲0.40
Turnout		18,846	95.33	▼0.75
Registered electors		19,770		▲4.90
PAP hold		Swing	▼10.29	
