= 1977 Singaporean by-elections =

1977 by-elections in Singapore

- 14 May 1977 (Radin Mas); 23 July 1977 (Bukit Merah)

2 seats to the Parliament of Singapore
- Registered: 35,412
- Turnout: 33,897 (95.72%) ▼1.27%
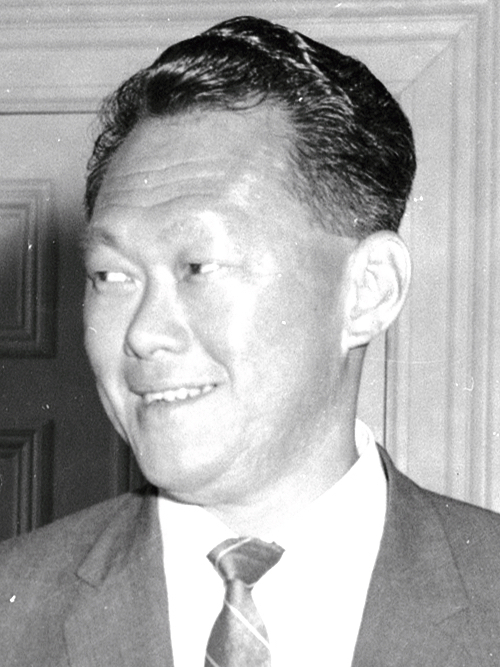

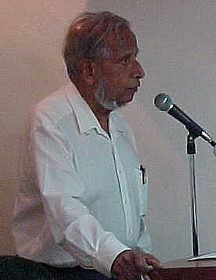
	First party	Second party	Third party
Leader	Lee Kuan Yew	J. B. Jeyaretnam	Lee Siew Choh
Party	PAP	WP	BS
Seats won	2	0	0
Seat change	Steady	Steady	Steady
Popular vote	23,678	5,021	4,473
Percentage	71.38%	15.14%	13.48%
Swing	▼4.62%	▲2.69%	▲13.48%
MPs before election
- N. Govindasamy Naidu
- Lim Guan Hoo
PAP
Elected MPs
- Bernard Chen
- Lim Chee Onn
PAP

On 14 May and 23 July 1977 in Singapore, by-elections were respectively held for the constituencies of Radin Mas and Bukit Merah. They were called following the deaths of their respective Member of Parliament, Govindasamy Naidu and Lim Guan Hoo.

== Background ==
On 14 February 1977, Govindasamy Naidu, the MP for Radin Mas, died suddenly from a myocardial infarction, resulting in Radin Mas being announced vacant. One day earlier before Govindasamy's death, Lim Guan Hoo, the MP for Bukit Merah suffered from a stroke and collapsed whilst watching the Vigilante Corps performing at the National Stadium. He was sent to the Singapore General Hospital where he stayed there in a coma for 172 days, before dying on 3 August at 2:40 am. His seat was vacated on 30 June.

While there were plans for a multi-cornered contest, opposition parties negotiated to nominate one to avoid risks of a vote splitting, and eventually saw a straight fight between one opposition against a debuting PAP candidate. In Radin Mas, the nominees were Bernard Chen, a former civil servant, and Workers' Party secretary-general J. B. Jeyaretnam; an independent candidate attempted to contest but was disqualified for the absence in electoral register. For Bukit Merah, civil administrator Lim Chee Onn and Lee Siew Choh of the Barisan Sosialis were nominated.

== Results ==
By-election, 14 May 1977: Radin Mas
Party	Candidate	Votes	%	±%
PAP	Bernard Chen	12,053	70.6	−5.1
WP	J. B. Jeyaretnam	5,021	29.4	+5.1
Majority		7,032	41.2	−10.2
Turnout		17,415	94.6	−2.5
PAP hold		Swing	-10.2	

By-election, 23 July 1977: Bukit Merah
Party	Candidate	Votes	%	±%
PAP	Lim Chee Onn	11,625	72.21	▼4.16
BS	Lee Siew Choh	4,473	27.79	N/A
Majority		7,152	44.42	▼8.32
Total valid votes		16,098	97.67	▼0.76
Rejected ballots		384	2.33	▲0.76
Turnout		16,482	97.31	▲0.41
Registered electors		16,937		▼3.43
PAP hold		Swing	▼4.16	
