= S. Vasoo =

Singaporean former politician and social worker (born 1941)

- எஸ். வாசு

Member of Parliament for Tanjong Pagar Group Representation Constituency
- In office 21 August 1991 – 3 November 2001
- Preceded by: Constituency established
- Succeeded by: Constituency abolished

Member of Parliament for Tiong Bahru Group Representation Constituency
- In office 4 September 1988 – 31 August 1991
- Preceded by: Constituency established
- Succeeded by: Constituency abolished

Member of Parliament for Bo Wen Constituency
- In office 22 December 1984 – 17 August 1988
- Preceded by: Constituency established
- Succeeded by: Constituency abolished

Personal details
- Born: Sushilan Vasoo; 1941 (age 84–85) Straits Settlements (present-day Nee Soon, Singapore)
- Children: 3
- Education: University of Singapore; University of Hong Kong

Sushilan Vasoo (Note: Tamil: சுசீலன் வாசு, romanized: Cucīlaṉ Vācu) (born 1941) is a Singaporean former politician and social worker. A former member of the governing People's Action Party (PAP), he was the Member of Parliament (MP) representing Bo Wen Constituency from 1984 to 1988, the Henderson division of Tiong Bahru Group Representation Constituency (GRC) from 1988 to 1991, and the Radin Mas division of Tanjong Pagar Group Representation Constituency from 1991 to 2001.

== Early life ==
Vasoo grew up in a village in Nee Soon, where his father worked as a sub-contractor. The village was largely populated by Chinese residents, which led him to learn Mandarin.

After he finished secondary school in 1959, he worked in Kluang, Malaysia as a trainee factory supervisor at a rubber plantation. Vasoo later moved back to Singapore and worked in psychiatric nursing at the Ministry of Health (MOH), he was posted to Woodbridge Hospital (now the Institute of Mental Health).

He later went and got a diploma at the University of Singapore after he obtained a bursary from the Children's Society and from 1971 to 1972, he worked as a tutor at the University of Singapore. In 1973, he joined the Council of Society Services as a deputy director and was later given an educational grant to go to Hong Kong to get a master's degree in social work at the University of Hong Kong.

Before getting into politics, Vasoo worked as a university lecturer at the Social Work department of the National University of Singapore.

== Career ==
In 1984, Vasoo was invited to join the People's Action Party (PAP) by then-Member of Parliament (MP) of Toa Payoh Constituency Eric Cheong. In the 1984 general election, Vasoo contested for Bo Wen Constituency and won with 74.70% of the vote against Sh Ahmad Salim of the United People's Front's 25.30%. Vasoo was subsequently elected as the MP for Bo Wen Constituency. During his rally speech, Vasoo spoke in English, Malay, Tamil, Mandarin, and Hokkien.

During the 1988 general election, after the dissolution of Bo Wen Constituency, Vasoo contested in the Henderson division of the Tiong Bahru Group Representation Constituency (GRC) along with Ch'ng Jit Koon and Chng Hee Kok against the Workers' Party (WP) team of Low Thia Khiang, Lim Lye Soon, and Gopalan Nair. Vasoo and his team won 57.84% of the vote and were elected as the MPs for Tiong Bahru GRC against the WP's 42.16%.

In the 1991 general election, Vasoo contested for the Radin Mas division of Tanjong Pagar GRC along with Koo Tsai Kee, Lee Kuan Yew, and Lim Hng Kiang and were elected unopposed. In 1993, Vasoo held a defamation suit against Singapore Democratic Party's Chee Soon Juan over alleged defamatory remarks made about him and was paid S$210,000 in damages.

In the 1997 general election, Vasoo contested again for the Radin Mas division of Tanjong Pagar GRC alongside Lim Swee Say, Ow Chin Hock, Chay Wai Chuen, Koo Tsai Kee, and Lee Kuan Yew and were elected unopposed again. In 2001, Vasoo retired from politics.

In 2024, Vasoo was awarded the Outstanding Lifetime Volunteer Award by Minister for Social and Family Development Masagos Zulkifli. On 23 November 2024, during the PAP's biennial conference, Vasoo was awarded the Meritorious Service Star Medal, the highest honour within the PAP, for his 40 years of service to the party and country.
