= One Marina Boulevard =

Office skyscraper in Singapore

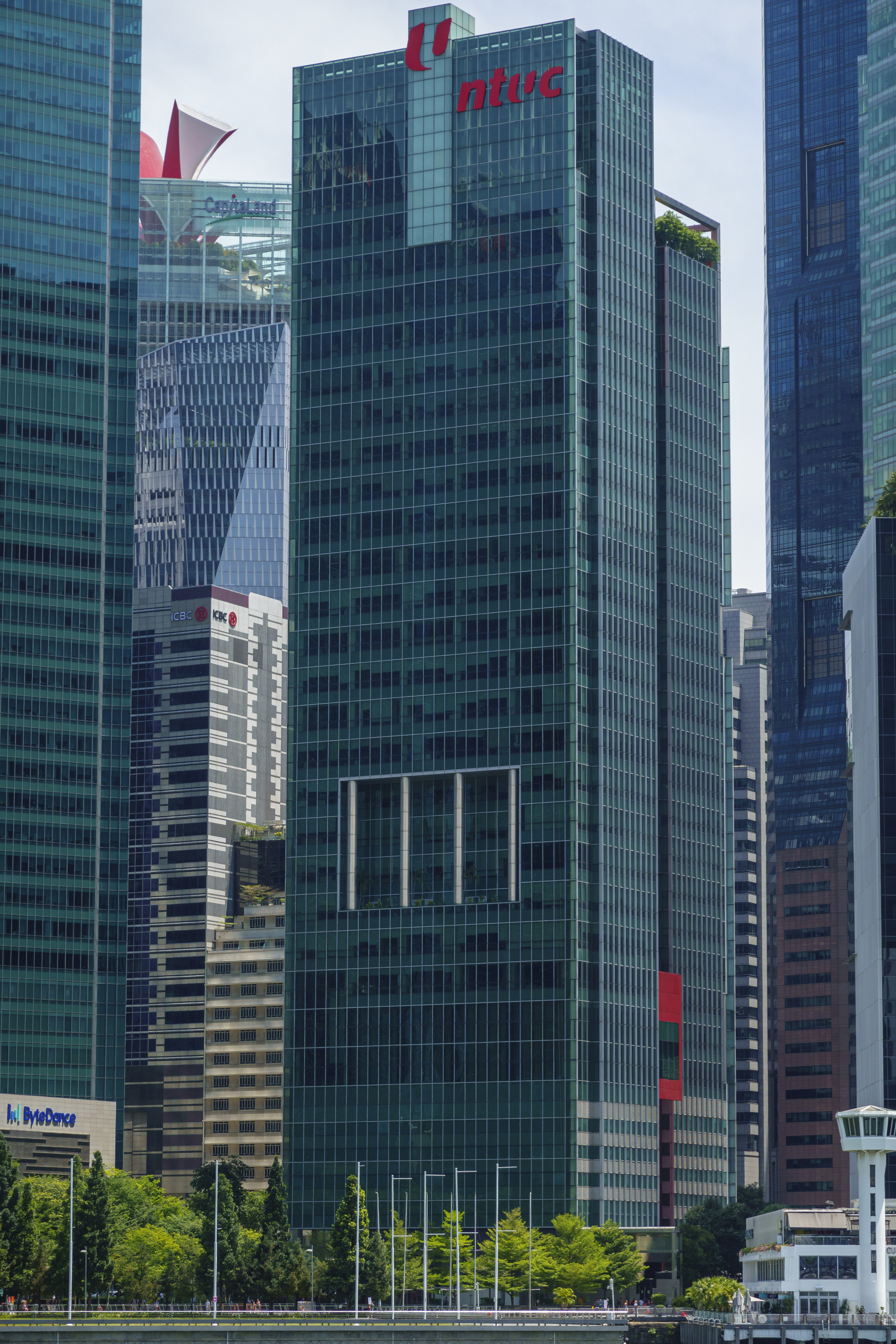
- One Marina Boulevard viewed from across the Marina Bay in July 2023
- Interactive map of the One Marina Boulevard area
- Alternative names: OMB, NTUC Centre, National Trades Union Congress Headquarters

General information
- Status: Completed
- Type: Commercial offices Government offices
- Architectural style: International
- Location: 1 Marina Boulevard, Singapore 018989
- Coordinates: 1.282263°N 103.852477°E
- Construction started: 2002; 24 years ago
- Completed: 2004; 22 years ago
- Owner: Singapore Labour Foundation

Height
- Roof: 110 m (360 ft)

Technical details
- Floor count: 32

Design and construction
- Architect: DP Architects

One Marina Boulevard, sometimes called NTUC Centre, is a 32-storey, 110 m (360 ft) skyscraper at 1 Marina Boulevard, in the zone of Raffles Place and Marina Bay, in the central business district of Singapore. The building is near other skyscrapers, such as One Raffles Quay, The Sail @ Marina Bay and Ocean Building, all of which are around 100 metres away. It has a direct link to Raffles Place MRT station via an air-conditioned underground mall.

The building is a Grade A office building, and its basement contains retail space. It sits on a land parcel of approximately 11,366.9 square metres. The gross floor area is 48,302 square metres. There is a total of 39,000 square metres of office space.

The site on which the development sits was the first opened up for development in the new downtown, Marina Bay, after the Singapore Labour Foundation Management Services was allocated the site by the government. The National Trades Union Congress (NTUC) occupies floors 11 to 14 in the building.

In 2005, One Marina Boulevard received a Certificate of Merit in the Best Buildable Design Awards, under the Commercial and Office Buildings Category.

== History ==
One Marina Boulevard was designed by DP Architects, and completed in 2004. Other firms involved in the development include Singapore Labour Foundation Management Services, Samsung Corporation, Beca Carter Hollings and Ferner, Hyder Consulting, Arup Singapore, Davis Langdon & Seah Singapore, Sika Services AG, Building Systems, and National Trades Union Congress. The groundbreaking ceremony was held on 28 February 2002, which formally kicked off the construction of the building.

=== Tender ===
Before One Marina Boulevard was built, the site on which it sat was put on sale. It was launched on 21 November 2000 and closed on 13 March 2001. Three days later, the successful tenderers, Boulevard Development Pte Ltd, Comina Investment Limited and Freyland Pte Ltd, was announced. A new company, One Marina Boulevard Pte Ltd, was incorporated to develop the land parcel.

Currently, the land parcel is on a 99-year lease. The tendered price of the land parcel was at S$461,816,800, or about S$3,125.24 per square metre.

=== Construction ===
During construction, fire engineering was used. This was the first time the method was used in Singapore. This allowed the building to be constructed closer to its surrounding neighbours, which shaved 7 metres off the usual code compliant solution. It also enabled the glass facade to be window sprinkler-free.

In 2004, computer simulation techniques were used to re-visit the design of the building. With these techniques, more people could be occupied in specific floor levels, than allowed in the original design. This also meant additional exit stairs didn't need to be provided in case of a fire emergency.

A total of 21 months was spent constructing the building, at a total cost of S$110.0 million (ca. US$80.0 million as of February 2008).

== Architecture ==
One Marina Boulevard adopts the international architectural style. It is mainly constructed out of glass and steel. Stone sculptures are used to decorate the main entrance. The typical floor-to-ceiling height of One Marina Boulevard is at 3.0 metres, and it has a loading of 4.0 to 7.0 kN/m^{2}. The centralised VAV system is applied in its air-conditioning system.

== Amenities ==
There are several amenities in the building. They include meeting and training rooms, a customer service centre owned by NTUC, as well as a 600-seat auditorium. There are a total of 209 parking lots in the building.

== Tenants ==
NTUC occupies the largest office space in One Marina Boulevard. Other major tenants include Allen & Gledhill, Singapore Workforce Development Agency and Microsoft Singapore. In October 2004, Microsoft Singapore moved from its previous offices at 5 Temasek Boulevard, Suntec Tower Five to the building. It has since been relocated to Frasers Tower in 2018. A major F&B company, TCC, is also located there. A AXS machine is located in the basement.

== Public transport ==
Passageway connecting to Raffles Place MRT station

One Marina Boulevard sits above one exit from the Raffles Place MRT station and is located near Downtown MRT station.

== Gallery ==
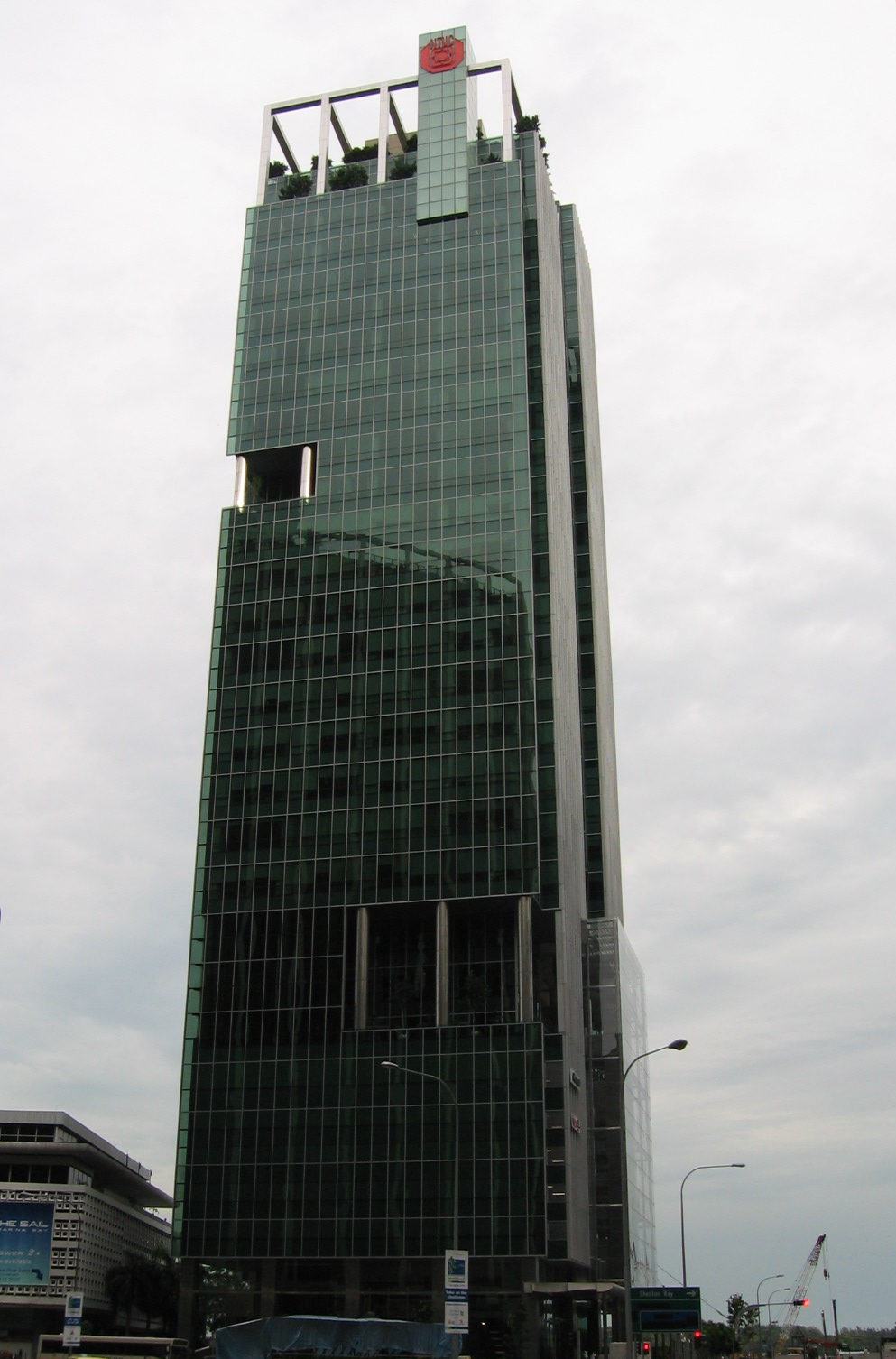
One Marina Boulevard from the side

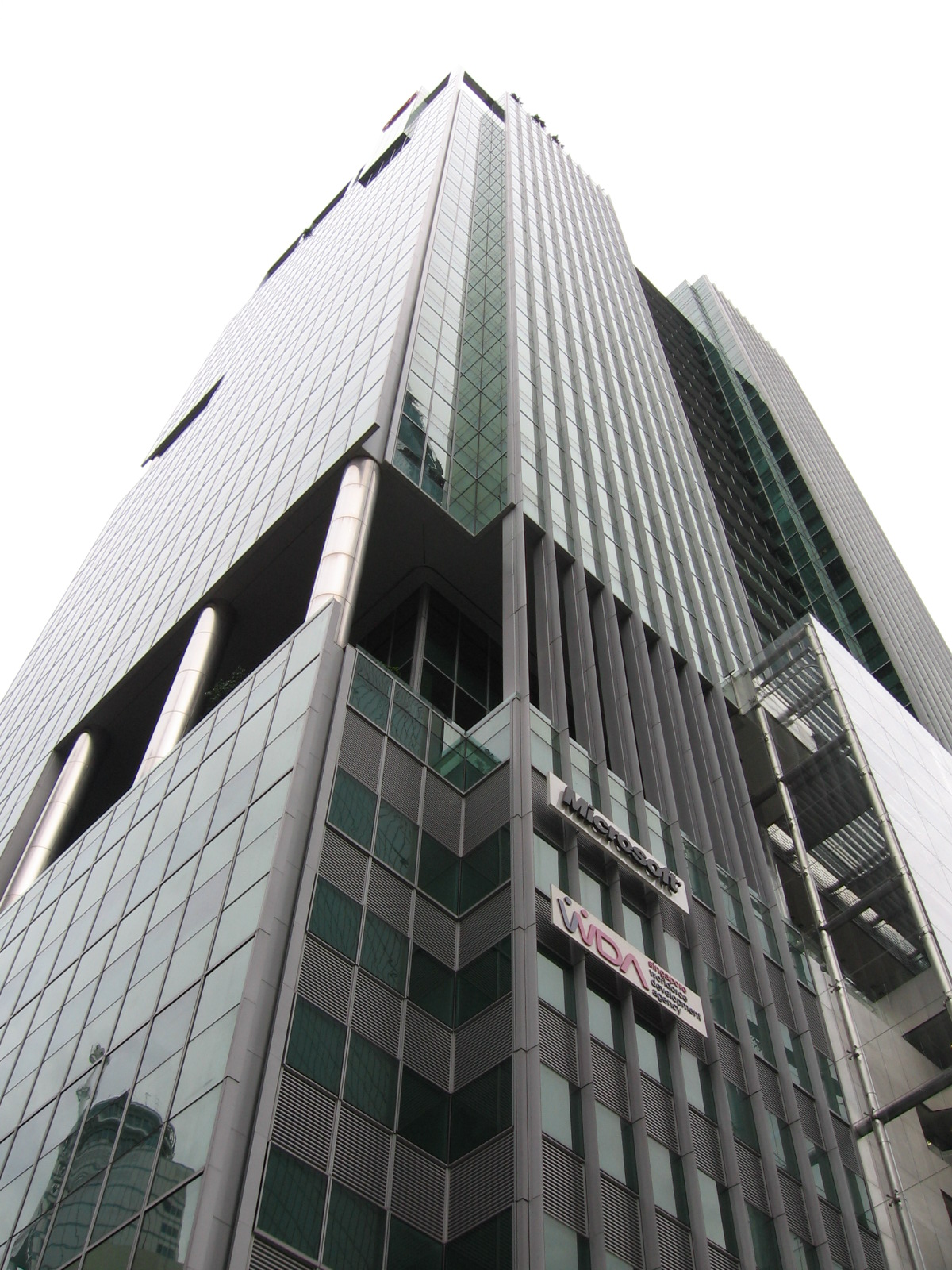
An alternate view of One Marina Boulevard

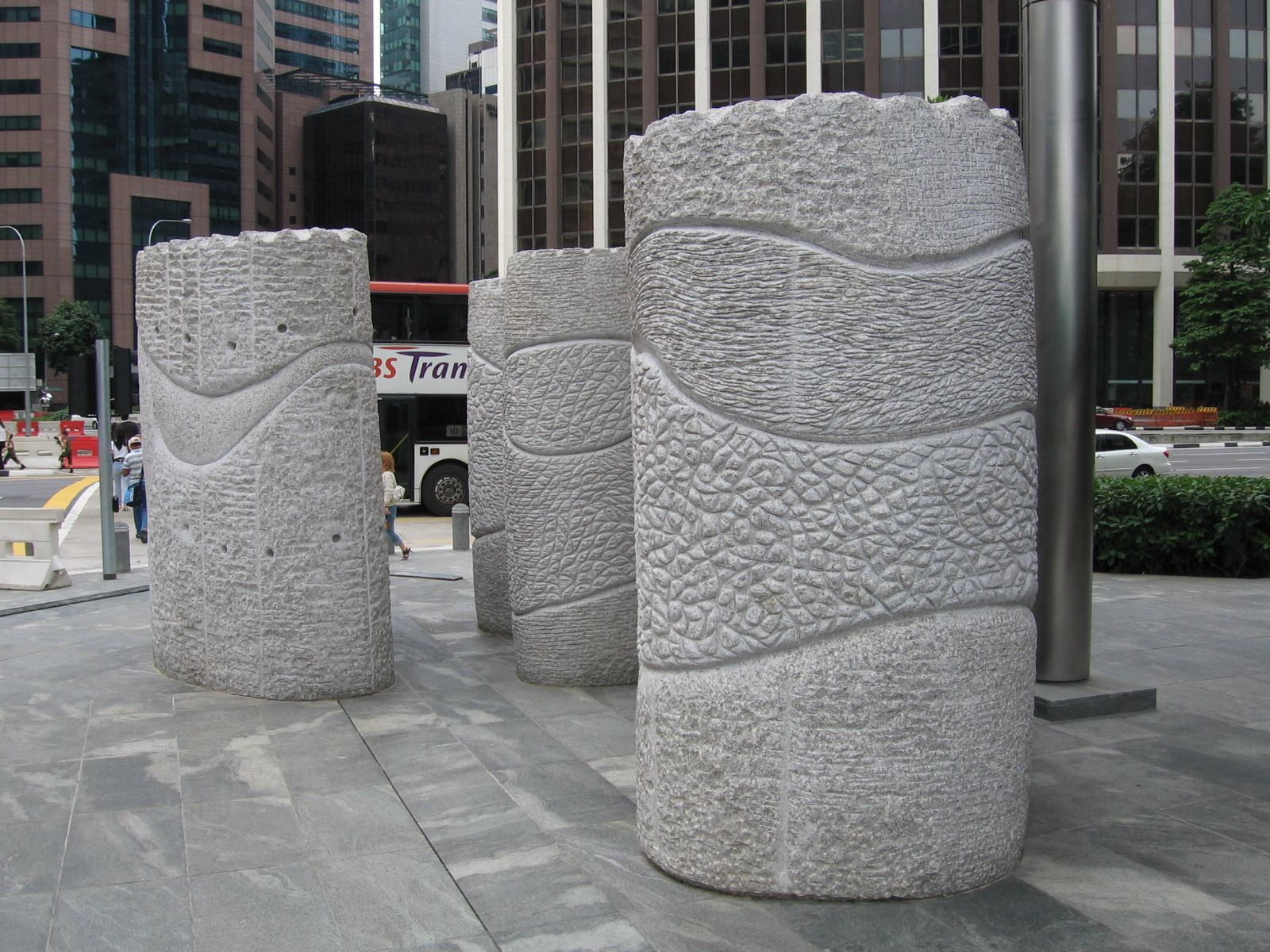
Stone sculptures at the entrance

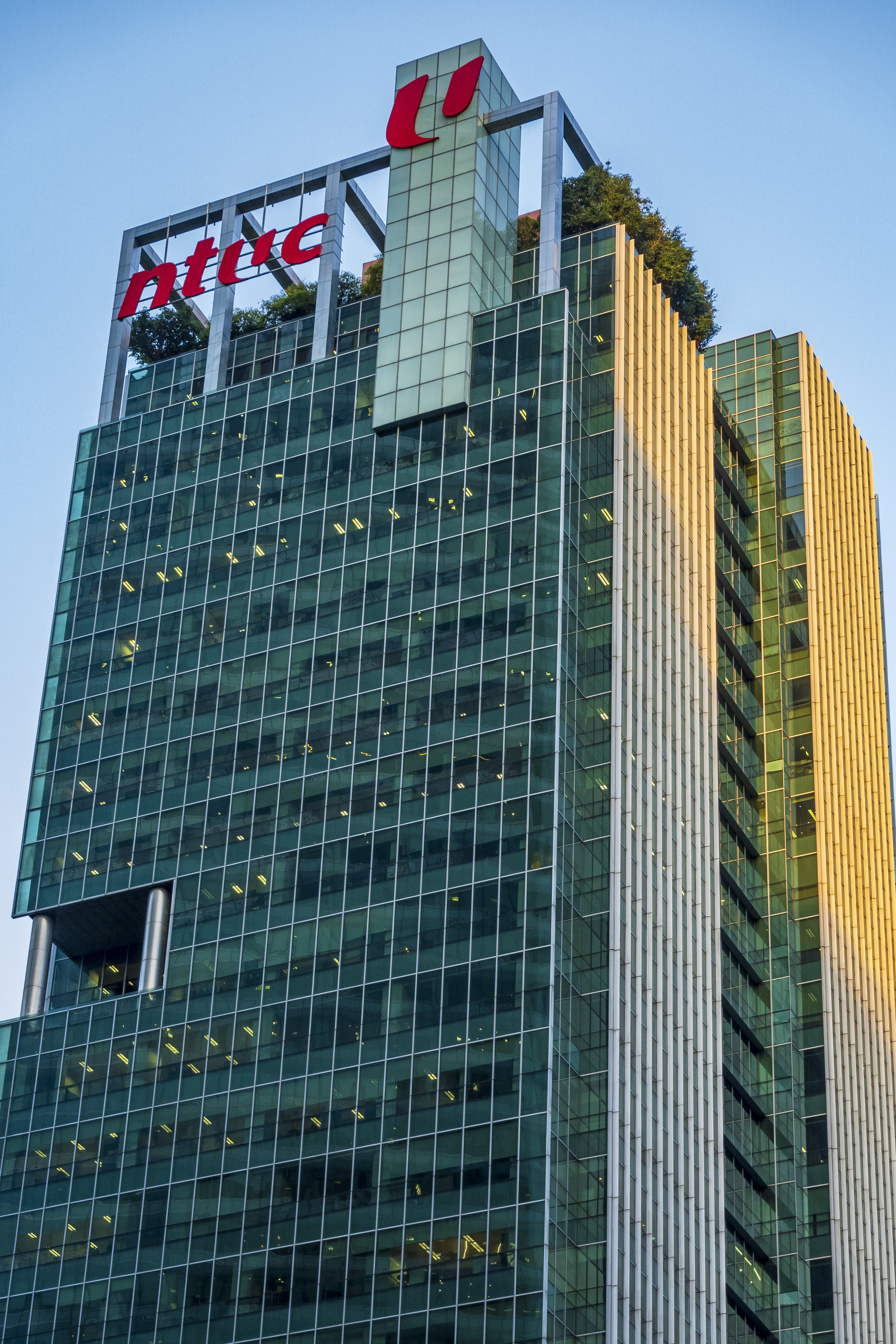
A picture of One Marina Boulevard in the evening light.

== See also ==
- List of tallest buildings in Singapore
