= Protection from Harassment Act (Singapore) =

Statute of the Parliament of Singapore

Protection from Harassment Act 2014
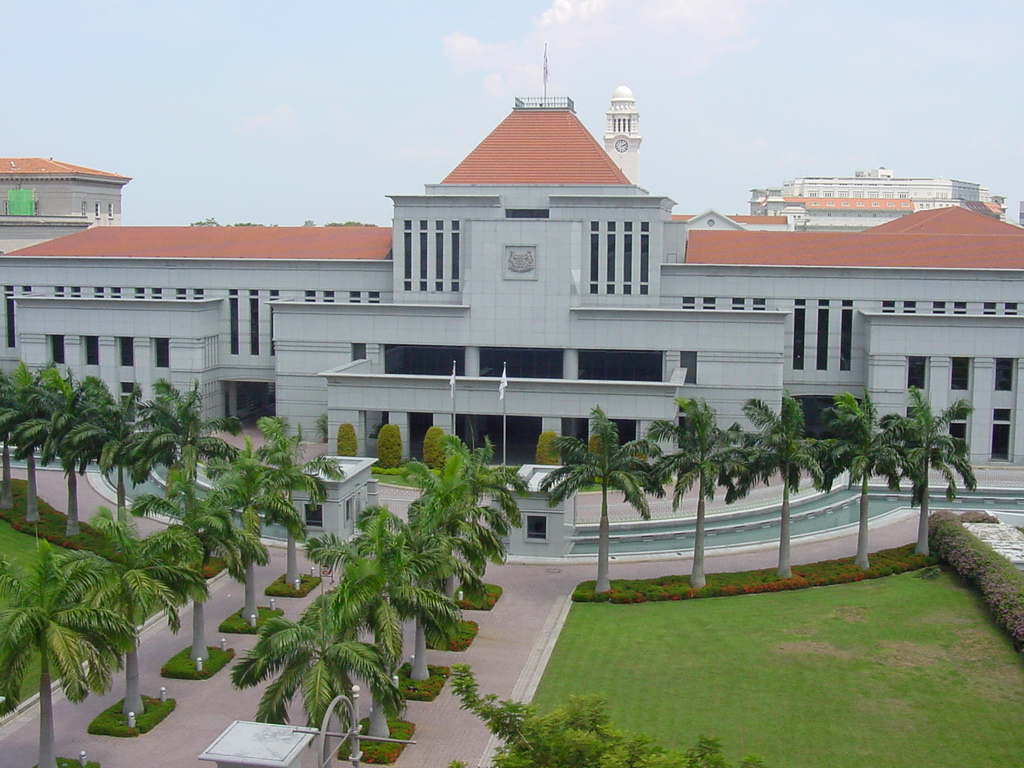

Parliament of Singapore
- Long title: An Act to protect persons against harassment and unlawful stalking and to create offences, and provide civil remedies related thereto or in relation to false statements of fact.
- Citation: Act 17 of 2014
- Enacted by: Parliament of Singapore
- Enacted: 13 March 2014
- Assented to: 11 April 2014
- Commenced: 15 November 2014

Legislative history
- Bill title: Protection from Harassment Bill
- Bill citation: Bill No: 12/2014
- Introduced by: K Shanmugam (Minister for Law)
- Introduced: 3 March 2014
- First reading: 3 March 2014
- Second reading: 13 March 2014
- Third reading: 13 March 2014

Amended by
- Protection from Harassment (Amendment) Act 2019
- Status: In force

The Protection from Harassment Act 2014 (POHA) is a statute of the Parliament of Singapore that criminalises harassment, stalking, and other anti-social behaviour. The law is designed specifically to make acts of cyberbullying and online harassment a criminal offence.

== Overview ==
The Act abolished the common law tort of harassment, replaced by its statutory provisions. It also replaced sections 13A to 13D of the Miscellaneous Offences (Public Order and Nuisance) Act, and expanded the scope to cover acts conducted online and increased the penalties to include imprisonment sentences. The Act is intended to cover both intentional and unintentional harassment, and has extra-territorial jurisdiction for certain offences which include online acts by the defendant if the complainant was in Singapore at the time of the offence and the defendant knew or should have known of that fact. The new law is also to be accessible for the public than previously: for instance, provisions are now made for alleged complainants to apply a protection order against an accused, and in more extreme cases a separate expedited protection order can be applied for and issued immediately. In addition, anyone who abuses public servant and public service worker, including service staff from the public transport service, can be prosecuted under this Act and the maximum penalty of jail for up to a year and/or a fine. Generally, for uncomplicated and minor cases private in nature, the offences may be compoundable by the alleged complainant for an out-of-court settlement, but subject to the consent of the DPP. For civil law and relational cases, they may be referred for mediation at the State Courts Centre for Dispute Resolution (SCCDR), including Magistrate's Complaints or applications under the Protection from Harassment Act. Mediation is a way of resolving a dispute without going for a trial in court. It is known as an alternative dispute resolution (ADR) method.

== Amendments in 2019 ==
In 2019, the Parliament seek to amend the Act to tackle offences such as doxxing. The original 2014 Act would kick in only if the communications to be “threatening, abusive or insulting”. Doxxing would not apply as it would only be considered as an act of divulging personal information. Additionally, the amendment simplified the process for victims to by setting up a specialised court within the State Courts of Singapore. The amendment also introduced a mechanism for individuals and entities to seek correction orders to counter fake news about them. Whilst there are similarities between this amendment and the Protection from Online Falsehoods and Manipulation Act (POFMA), POFMA can only be invoked by ministers of Singapore and it will take a longer time for individuals and entities to successfully apply for a correction order.

== Cases ==
The Ministry of Manpower, National Trades Union Congress and Singapore National Employers Federation are at present the primary institutions in deterring workplace harassment.

In August 2015, a former Singapore Civil Defence Force (SCDF) senior officer was charged in court under a POHA complaint filed by a woman complainant. The maximum penalty for the offence is up to a S$5,000 fine and 12 months' jail. In December 2016, the defendant engaged a defence counsel and managed to compound the court charge by making an open court apology and a monetary compensation to the alleged complainant as a composition. The alleged complainant was agreeable to the composition after the consequences of accepting and rejecting the offer of composition were thoroughly explained to her. Having considered the facts and in the light of further developments arising after he was first charged, the deputy public prosecutor has consented to composition. Hence, he was granted a discharge amounting to an acquittal by the court judge.

In May 2015, the Ministry of Defence obtained a protection order against The Online Citizen. It was later, after legal arguments made by lawyers Choo Zhengxi and Eugene Thuraisingam, overturned by the Court of Appeal in January 2017, which ruled in a 2-1 judgement that the Government of Singapore is ineligible as a 'person' to apply for a protection order against any individual.

In July 2019, a senior policeman was interdicted from service, charged in court and fined for harassment to a female colleague. Thereafter, a Singapore Police Force (SPF) spokesperson said that its officers are not only expected to uphold the law but maintain the highest standards of conduct and integrity. He added that SPF deals severely with officers who break the law, including charging them in court. Moreover, SPF has since commenced disciplinary proceedings against him after the court verdict.

In 2019, a few people were charged in court for using foul language to vehemently abuse public servants and public service workers.

As at March 2019, there were more than 500 Protection Order applications made since November 2014.

In December 2019, a freelance actress-model was charged and fined under POHA for abusive language and hurling vulgarities towards public servants.

In March 2020, five men were charged in court for abusing public servants.

== See also ==
- Protection from Harassment Act 1997, United Kingdom
