= Lim Guan Hoo =

Singaporean politician (1939–1977)

- 林源河
- Lim in 1974

Member of Parliament for Bukit Merah Single Member Constituency
- In office 18 January 1966 – 30 June 1977
- Preceded by: Lim Huan Boon
- Succeeded by: Lim Chee Onn

Personal details
- Born: Lim Guan Hoo; 1939 Singapore, Straits Settlements
- Died: 3 August 1977 (aged 37–38) Singapore General Hospital, Singapore
- Resting place: Kong Meng San Phor Kark See Crematorium
- Children: 2
- Education: Nanyang University; Singapore University

Lim Guan Hoo (Note: Chinese: 林源河; Pe̍h-ōe-jī: Lîm Goân-hô; pinyin: Lín Yuánhé) (1939 – 3 August 1977) was a Singaporean politician. A member of the People's Action Party (PAP), he served as the Member of Parliament (MP) representing Bukit Merah Single Member Constituency (SMC) from 1966 till his death in office in 1977. Lim also served as Parliamentary Secretary to Communications from 1972 to 1973 and to Home Affairs from 1973 to 1977.

== Early life and education ==
Lim was first in his Chinese language and Literature classes consisting of 88 students. In 1960, he graduated from Nanyang University with a Bachelor of Arts. From 1971 to 1974, Lim got his Master of Arts at Singapore University by studying part-time. Before working in politics, he was a lecturer at Nanyang University and an editor of the Chinese edition of Petir.

== Career ==
Lim made his political debut at the 1966 by-elections, contesting for Member of Parliament (MP) of Bukit Merah Single Member Constituency (SMC) against independent Madai Puthan Damodaran Nair, where Lim was elected with 82.94%. At the 1968 general election, he contested for MP of Bukit Merah SMC again, being elected unopposed.

In the 1972 general election, Lim contested for MP of Bukit Merah SMC again, against Kho Jiak Hiong of Workers' Party and Said bin Jali of Barisan Sosialis, and was elected with 69.33% of the vote. At the 1976 general election, Lim contested for MP of Bukit Merah SMC again, against Wong Kui Yu of United Front, being elected with 76.37% of the vote.

== Death ==
On 13 February 1977, Lim suffered from a stroke and collapsed whilst watching the Vigilante Corps performing at the National Stadium. He was sent to the Singapore General Hospital where he stayed there in a coma for 172 days, dying on 3 August at 2:40 am. He was survived by his wife, a teacher at Chung Hwa Girls' High School, and 2 sons. He was cremated at Kong Meng San Phor Kark See Crematorium.

== See also ==
- List of members of the Singapore Parliament who died in office
