= Assisi Hospice =

Hospice in Singapore

Geography
- Location: 832 Thomson Rd, Singapore

Organisation
- Patron: Ho Ching

Services
- Emergency department: Yes
- Beds: 85

Helipads
- Helipad: No

History
- Founded: 1961

Links
- Website: www.assisihospice.org.sg
- Lists: Hospitals in Singapore

Assisi Hospice is a hospice facility in Singapore that provides palliative care to terminally ill patients. It is founded, owned, and run by the Franciscan Missionaries of the Divine Motherhood (FMDM).

Founded in 1969 by the FMDM as Assisi Home for the Poor and Sick, the hospice was reconstituted as Assisi Hospice in 2007. It derives its name from Assisi, the birthplace of Saint Francis, who founded the Franciscan movement.

== History ==
In 1949, the FMDM Sisters were invited by the local government for a nursing post in the Tuberculosis section of Tan Tock Seng Hospital in Singapore. The Sisters were also involved in treatment for leprosy at the Singapore Leprosy Relief Association, now known as the Trafalgar Home. The Sisters campaigned for funds to build a Catholic hospital in the country after Singapore recovered from the Japanese Occupation.

The Mount Alvernia Hospital was opened on 4 March 1961. In 1969, Khoo Teck Puat donated funds for an extension of the hospital for chronically ill patients. In 1986, the Khoo extension started accepting respite patients. The building eventually became known as Assisi Home for the Poor and Sick.

In March 1988, the Congregation of the Franciscan Missionaries of the Divine Motherhood expanded into the area of hospice care. Assisi Home began to admit only cancer patients requiring respite and hospice care. In 1992, the Sisters vacated their convent and refurbished it into a new hospice.

Assisi Home & Hospice was officially opened in April 1993 by the then President of Singapore, the late Wee Kim Wee. In 1993, Assisi Home discontinued the admission of patients for long-term care and focused on hospice care for terminally ill cancer patients. Later, Assisi Home & Hospice was renamed Assisi Hospice.

As a centre for palliative care, Assisi Hospice also admitted patients with non-cancer diagnoses, as it recognized the significant suffering among those with other life limiting illnesses.

== Facilities and services ==
Assisi Hospice provides in-patient hospice care, day-care facilities, and home care support. In 2011, the hospice provided care to 444 in-patients, 101 day-care patients, and 675 home-care patients, with the vast majority originating from public hospitals.

As of 2012, Assisi Hospice had a capacity of 37 beds and 90 staff, of whom five were full-time doctors trained in palliative care. It also had 570 volunteers in its database.

== Facilities ==
The current building occupied by Assisi Hospice used to be a convent belonging to the Franciscan Missionaries of the Divine Motherhood nuns.

In 2012, after an open tender and design competition held to appoint a team of multidisciplinary consultants, a team led by architect and lead consultant New Space Architects Private Limited was selected.

Assisi Hospice moved to its new premises in January 2017. Sited next to its former building and costing 70 million Singapore Dollars (SGD), the new six-story building was designed to serve more than 2,000 patients a year which is double the number of patients it was previously serving. There are now 85 beds, up from 37. Its groundbreaking ceremony was held on 29 July 2013.

On 30 November 2013, philanthropist Khoo Bee See, daughter of the late banker-philanthropist Khoo Teck Puat, pledged 1 million SGD to Assisi Hospice, one of the largest sums an individual had donated to the hospice.

Facilities offered by Assisi Hospice include:

- Beds

The six-story building spread over 5,515 m^{2} (59,360 sq ft) of land that will have 48 single rooms, with the rest being two- or four-bed rooms.

- Dementia & Pediatric Wards

The new hospice will also have a specialized 16-bed ward for dementia patients and a dedicated pediatric palliative care ward, both of which will be the first-ever wards built in Singapore, especially for dementia patients and pediatric patients undergoing palliative care.

The palliative care ward will have a 'closed loop' leading to and from the ward through a bridge, and a sensory garden to prevent patients from wandering out of the ward.

The pediatric ward will have child-friendly features, as well as a playground and garden. The hospice will offer play therapy and art therapy.

- Daycare centre

The new hospice will also have a larger daycare centre, which will be able to serve 50 patients, 20 more than it currently does.

- Ambulatory treatment unit

The new hospice will also offer an ambulatory (or walking) treatment unit which will render urgent medical help for patients who do not need to be admitted as an in-patient.

- Family features

The new hospice will have a chapel, a labyrinth, a 'kopitiam'-type dining area for patients and their families, and two family rooms where families of patients can stay the night.

- Training and education

A Centre for Palliative Care Education and Therapy will be established in the new building to train healthcare professionals and volunteers in palliative care. This will include a centre for grief and bereavement education, which will carry out training as well as public awareness programs.

- Staffing

The hospice will increase its number of home palliative care teams from three to five to help 500 more patients. It will also increase its number of staff to 250, including 12 full-time doctors.
