= Tiong Bahru Group Representation Constituency =

Electoral division in Singapore

Tiong Bahru
- Former group representation constituency for the Parliament of Singapore
- Region: Singapore
- Electorate: 58,898

Former constituency
- Created: 1988
- Abolished: 1991
- Seats: 3
- Party: People's Action Party
- Members: Chng Hee Kok; Ch'ng Jit Koon; S Vasoo
- Town Council: Tiong Bahru
- Replaced by: Tanjong Pagar GRC

The Tiong Bahru Group Representation Constituency (GRC) was a three-member group representation constituency in Singapore that existed from 1988 to 1991, consisting of the pre-GRC constituencies of Anson, Henderson, and Tiong Bahru. It was replaced by Tanjong Pagar GRC after one term in Parliament. The Members of Parliament (MPs) for this GRC were Ch'ng Jit Koon, Chng Hee Kok and S Vasoo from the People's Action Party (PAP).

== History ==
In 1991, Tiong Bahru GRC was merged into a new GRC, Tanjong Pagar GRC.

== Members of Parliament ==
| Year | Division | Members of Parliament | Party |
|---|---|---|---|
Formation
| 1988 | Henderson; Radin Mas; Tiong Bahru | S Vasoo; Chng Hee Kok; Ch'ng Jit Koon | PAP |
Constituency abolished (1991)

== Electoral results ==
Note: The Elections Department does not include rejected votes when calculating the vote shares of candidates. Hence, all candidates' vote shares will total to 100% at any given election (may not appear so in multi-way contests due to rounding).

=== Elections in 1980s ===
General Election 1988
| Party | Candidate | Votes | % |
|---|---|---|---|
| PAP | Chng Hee Kok Ch'ng Jit Koon S Vasoo | 31,732 | 57.84 |
| WP | Low Thia Khiang Lim Lye Soon Gopalan Nair | 23,132 | 42.16 |
| Majority | | 8,600 | 15.68 |
| Total valid votes | | 54,864 | 98.56 |
| Rejected ballots | | 799 | 1.44 |
| Turnout | | 55,663 | 93.15 |
| Registered electors | | 58,898 | |
| PAP win (new seat) | | | |
