= Labour movement of Singapore =

- National organization(s): NTUC
- Regulatory authority: Ministry of Manpower
- Primary legislation: Employment Act of 1968

Global Rights Index
- 2 Repeated violations of rights

International Labour Organization
- Singapore is a member of the ILO

Convention ratification
- Right to Organise: 25 October 1965

The National Trades Union Congress (NTUC) spearheads the labour movement of Singapore, which represents almost a million workers in the country across more than 70 unions, affiliated associations and related organisations. Singapore runs on a tripartism model which aims to offer competitive advantages for the country by promoting economic competitiveness, harmonious government-labour-management relations and the overall progress of the nation.

NTUC, along with its tripartite partners, the Singapore National Employers Federation (SNEF) and Ministry of Manpower (MOM), work together to tackle issues such as job re-creation, raising the effective retirement age, skills training and upgrading of the workforce, promotion of fair and progressive employment practices, and a flexible wage system, among other labour-related issues.

The modernisation of the labour movement in the late 1960s has nurtured cooperation-based rather than confrontational labour relations between employees and employers. Today, rather than engaging in traditional adversarial unionism, union leaders in Singapore also sit on major statutory boards and are actively involved in state policymaking, allowing them to use negotiation, conciliation and arbitration, thus eradicating strikes and other industrial action as a form of settling labour disputes.

Major strikes are a rare occurrence in Singapore; only two major strikes were observed in recent decades, once by shipyard workers in 1986 that was sanctioned by then NTUC secretary-general Ong Teng Cheong, and the November 2012 wildcat strike by SMRT Corporation's bus drivers.

== Tripartism in Singapore ==
Tripartism in Singapore, which refers to the collaboration among Singapore unions, employers and the government, has been practised since 1965 when the National Trades Union Congress (NTUC) and the Singapore government signed a Charter for Industrial Progress and a Productivity Code of Practice. In the 1960s, the tripartism institution was still weak, but the formation of the National Wages Council (NWC) in 1972 and later the Tripartite Alliance for Fair Employment Practices (TAFEP) in 2007 helped strengthen ties between the members. The tripartite was set up to strive for better working conditions for employees in Singapore and to maintain harmonious employment relations through the implementation of specific policies governing labour relations.

The Singapore General Labour Union (SGLU) was formed in October 1945 to help Singapore develop a stable employment environment in times of turmoil and uncertainty. SGLU was quickly renamed as the Singapore Federation of Trade Union (SFTU) in 1946, which eventually became the NTUC as we know it today. The role of NWC is to formulate wage guidelines in line with Singapore's social development and long-term economic growth. Every year, NWC convenes to discuss wage and wage-related matters, and issues guidelines pertaining to the remuneration of Singapore workers based on tripartite consensus.

TAFEP works in partnership with employer organisations, unions and the government to create awareness and facilitate the adoption of fair, responsible and merit-based employment practices, providing tools and resources, including training workshops, advisory services, and educational materials, to help organisations implement fair employment practices.

With the Protection from Harassment Act 2014, the Ministry of Manpower (Singapore), NTUC and the Singapore National Employers Federation (SNEF) have also developed an advisory since 23 December 2015 fighting workplace harassment.

== History ==
A month after the Japanese forces formally surrendered Singapore to the British on 12 September 1945, the Singapore General Labour Union (SGLU) was formed. The British Military Administration was established shortly after to govern the island-colony until March 1946, working alongside the SGLU. The restoration process of Singapore's economy and employment conditions was facilitated by the cooperation between the two. SGLU was then renamed as the Singapore Federation of Trade Union (SFTU) in 1946.

On 13 June 1951, the Singapore Trade Union Congress (STUC) was established to replace the SFTU. However, the STUC split in 1961 into the left-wing Singapore Association of Trade Unions (SATU) and the non-communist National Trades Union Congress (NTUC). SATU led a general strike against the government and was banned from operation when the leaders were arrested in the Operation Coldstore. NTUC quickly became the leading trade union organization due to their effectiveness and the symbiotic relationship with the People's Action Party (PAP), which was then institutionalized by formal links.

In 1968, when the British announced that they would be withdrawing all their military forces in Singapore by 1971, the government was faced with anxiety over Singapore's economy fearing that the retreat would leave thousands jobless. Laws were enacted to clearly delineate functions of management and those of trade unions. NTUC endorsed the Employment Act after being assured by the government that employers would not be allowed to exploit workers. NTUC's support for the new law led to a massive inflow of foreign investments thus resulting in a rapid expansion of Singapore's economy.

Changes in the labour scene brought unsettling effects on workers in the unionized sector, causing membership to drop. In response, NTUC held a seminar to discuss ways to modernize the labour movement. It resulted in a decision to set up cooperatives to help meet the social needs of their members.

In 1965, NTUC and the government signed a Charter for Industrial Progress and a Productivity Code of Practice. During the 1960s, the tripartism institution was still weak, but the formation of the National Wages Council (NWC) in the 1970s boosted the collaboration within the labour movement. NWC would review the state of the economy and offer rational recommendations on wage negotiations.

The labour movement then introduced the Central Provident Fund, a social security scheme sustained by compulsory contributions by employer and employee, which provided the necessary capital for government projects and financial security for the country's workers in their old age. Towards the end of the 1970s, NTUC supported the government's efforts in restructuring the economy. The government changed its strategic focus from labour-intensive manufacturing to more skilled and technology-focused, causing workers without basic education to face unemployment. The labour movement started programmes for these workers so that they could have the basis to go on to skills courses.

Singapore went into a recession in the mid-1980s that caused conflict between productivity and wage increases. To help the nation recover, NWC recommended the unions to forgo the 1985 wage increase and accept cuts in the employers' contributions to the Central Provident Fund (CPF). This drove Singapore into a quick recovery from the recession. During this period, a flexible wage system was introduced by the NTUC with full support from the labour movement. In 1990, the Singapore Institute of Labour Studies (SILS) was set up dedicating Singapore's desire to have a labour college. The Labour Movement 2011 (LM2011) vision was launched by NTUC to push for an all-inclusive labour movement that seeks to represent workers of all colors, nationalities, and ages and those in the new and high-growth sectors that have not been reached out to before.

Singapore scored 2 on the Global Rights Index (GRI) by the International Trade Union Confederation (ITUC), which signifies "repeated violations of rights".

== Major strikes ==
=== 1955 Hock Lee bus riots ===
Workers from the Hock Lee Amalgamated Bus Company started a strike on 23 April 1955 to protest against poor working conditions, long working hours and low wages. The protesters which include some Chinese students blocked buses from leaving the depots, crippling the city's entire transport system. The protests further escalated into a major riot on 12 May 1955, which later came to be known as “Black Thursday”.

Some 2,000 students and strikers were involved in the riots, which the police tried to break up with water cannons and tear gas. The crowd retaliated to the police actions by stoning policemen and buses. In total, two police officers, a student and an American press correspondent were killed in the riot while many others sustained serious injuries.

=== 1955 Singapore Traction Company (STC) strike ===
This 142-day strike paralysed the public bus system. While the grievances were over low pay, the British ownership of the STC fuelled the anticolonial sentiments of the workers.

=== 1960 Singapore Glass Factory strike ===
On 28 August 1960, 600 employees of Singapore Glass Manufacturers Co Ltd went on a strike that lasted 73 days due to disagreements between Singapore Glass Manufacturers and its employees.

=== 1980 Singapore Airline Pilots' Association industrial action ===
In October 1980, Singapore Airlines' (SIA) flight crews began a work-to-rule which was organised by executive council of the Singapore Airline Pilots' Association (SIAPA) after disputes with SIA over a series of claims and wage demands. The industrial action was ruled illegal for failing to ballot members to start the industrial action. With the Ministry of Labour and the NTUC failing to bring a stop to the industrial action, Prime Minister Lee Kuan Yew personally intervened in the industrial action and summoned the leaders behind the strike to the Istana, with the result of fifteen ex-co members were charged and convicted. SIAPA was deregistered with a new union, the Air Line Pilots' Association Singapore (ALPA–S), being created to replace SIAPA.

=== 1986 Hydril strike ===
On 2 January 1986, 61 workers from American oilfield equipment company Hydril voted to strike and picketed outside their factory. The two-day strike, which was sanctioned by then Secretary General of the NTUC, Ong Teng Cheong, was over the alleged victimisation and dismissal of six union members and officials. The strike resulted in an agreement to reinstate Abdul Rahman, who was the treasurer of the Hydril branch union, as well as compensate each of the five others who were dismissed the year before.

=== 2012 SMRT wildcat bus strikes ===
On 26 November 2012, up to 171 bus drivers from mainland China, who were employed by SMRT Buses, refused to go to work in protest against the disparity in salary between them and other foreign bus captains. 88 workers carried the wildcat strike into the next day by continuing the refusal to go to work. The strike was considered illegal due to the strikers' failure to give their employer 14 days' notice of their intent to go on strike, which was required by law for essential services such as transport. Kit Wei Zheng, an economist at Citibank Singapore argued that given the increase in labour activism across the world, the fact that it had come to Singapore was unsurprising.

The strike resulted in five of the drivers who instigated the strike being charged in court. Out of the five, Bao Feng Shan was handed a six-week jail sentence for his role in the strike. Twenty-nine other drivers who participated in the illegal strike had their work permits revoked and were sent back to China, while over 150 drivers were let off with warning letters from the local police.

== Other labour disputes and industrial action ==
=== 2023 Flash Coffee labour dispute ===
In October 2023, employees of Flash Coffee, a Singapore-based coffee chain, reportedly were in a dispute with their employer because they were owed salary payments and Central Provident Fund (CPF) contributions. The coffee chain closed all of its 11 outlets in Singapore and stated that it would cease operations in Singapore completely. The company's status as reflected on the Accounting and Corporate Regulatory Authority (ACRA)'s website was "in liquidation - creditors' voluntary winding up".

According to a sign at a closed Flash Coffee outlet, the coffee chain's baristas were "on strike" due to "several late salary payouts". The company denied allegations that its employees were on strike and stated that since it had ceased operations in Singapore, its baristas were "not required to report to work".

The Food, Drink and Allied Workers' Union (FDAWU) stated that it was providing assistance to affected members in relation to salary claims and would also provide job assistance support. According to the FDAWU, its members were owed 75% of their September salaries, their salary for work done until 12 October, as well as encashment of remaining leave entitlements.

=== 2025 Changi Airport taxi driver labour dispute ===
On 13 February, nearly 100 ComfortDelGro and Prime Taxi drivers of large taxis and maxi-cabs agreed to stop picking up passengers from Changi Airport between 9am and midnight that day to protest the diversion of their business to a new mini-bus service introduced by the airport operator, Changi Airport Group. The drivers parked their vehicles in the holding area of the ground transport concierge at the airport that day, and gathered to convey their views to CAG and complain about what they described as "unfair" practices.

According to the drivers, CAG had been prioritising its new mini-bus services over taxi services, such that the taxi drivers' waiting times for passengers had increased from 30 - 60 minutes to 4 - 5 hours. The drivers emphasised that contrary to what they were initially told by the ground transport concierge, which was that the min-bus service would only serve groups of passengers who could not be accommodated in large taxis or maxi-cabs, since the beginning of February, the ground transport concierge had been directing passengers in groups of 3 to 6, who can be accommodated in the large taxis or max-cabs, to the mini-bus service instead, notwithstanding that the mini-buses had a much higher capacity of 13 passengers.

Following the labour action taken, which was described by local Chinese media as a "protest", CAG stated that it had not approved any prioritisation of the min-bus service over the large taxis and maxi-cabs.

In response to media queries, Yeo Wan Ling, assistant secretary-general of NTUC and advisor to the National Taxi Association (NTA), stated that the NTA had engaged CAG about the allegedly unfair passenger distribution practices at Changi Airport. Yeo further stated that the drivers did not go on strike and there had been no disruption to the services provided.

CAG has stated that the mini-bus service was a new service being trialed and the trial was suspended until further notice.
