= National Trades Union Congress =

Singaporean national trade union centre

- Malay: Kongres Kesatuan Sekerja Kebangsaan; Chinese: 全国职工总会; Tamil: தேசிய தொழிற்சங்க காங்கிரஸ்

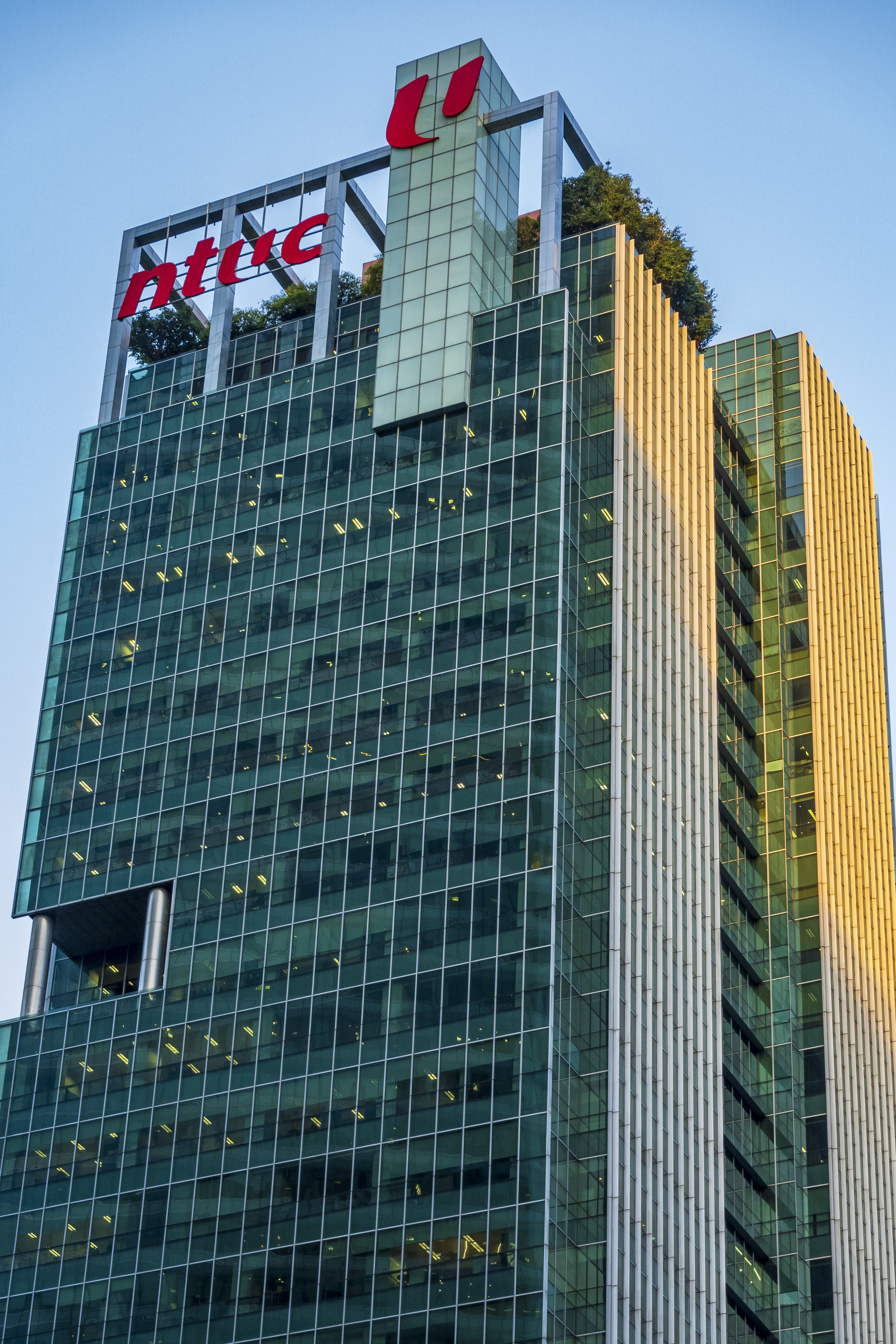
- Headquarters of the NTUC at One Marina Boulevard
- Abbreviation: NTUC
- Founded: 6 September 1961; 65 years ago
- Headquarters: 1 Marina Boulevard, Singapore 018989
- Location: Singapore
- Members: 1 million (2021)
- Key people: K. Thanaletchimi (Chairperson); Ng Chee Meng (Gen. Sec.)
- Affiliations: ITUC and PAP
- Website: www.ntuc.org.sg

The National Trades Union Congress (NTUC), also known as the Singapore National Trades Union Congress (SNTUC) internationally, is the sole national trade union centre in Singapore. NTUC leads the labour movement of Singapore, comprising 59 affiliated trade unions, 5 affiliated trade associations, 6 social enterprises, 6 related organisations and other enterprise partners. The NTUC also helms May Day celebrations, organising an annual rally to champion workers' solidarity and reinforce the nation's tripartite partnership.

Since its inception, the NTUC has maintained a close, symbiotic relationship with the People's Action Party (PAP), Singapore's ruling political party since 1959. This alliance solidified after 1969, when the union neutralised independent labour militancy and abandoned its confrontational roots. By trading traditional strike actions for a cooperative model, the union subordinated worker resistance to broader state economic goals. This pivotal shift established a system of state corporatism, locking the labour movement firmly in step with government priorities.

== History ==
The NTUC was first established in 1961 when the Singapore Trades Union Congress (STUC), which had backed the People's Action Party (PAP) in its successful drive for self-government back in 1959, split into the pro-PAP NTUC and the non-affiliated and more leftist Singapore Association of Trade Unions (SATU). The SATU collapsed in 1963, following the now PAP-led government's crackdown and detention of its leaders during Operation Coldstore and its subsequent official deregistration on 13 November 1963, leaving the NTUC as the sole trade union centre. Currently, an overwhelming majority of union members (over 98%) are in unions affiliated with the NTUC.

After the PAP's decisive general election victory in 1968 where it won all seats in Parliament, the government passed the Industrial Relations (Amendment) Act of 1968, which made a significant amendment to the legislated Industrial Relations Act of 1960 by severely limiting workers rights to engage in either direct collective bargaining with employers, industrial action or strike action. From 1969, the NTUC adopted, in its own words, "a cooperative, rather than a confrontational policy towards employers". The NTUC reached its target of 1 million members in 2021.

=== Relationship with the People's Action Party (PAP) ===
Since the NTUC's inception and when PAP gained governance in 1959, relations between both sides are very connected, and have often resulted in members concurrently holding office in both organisations. The NTUC's founder, Devan Nair, was a PAP stalwart and later served as President of Singapore, is one such example. The level of the connection is subject to criticism in the ongoing years notably the 2025 when Jalan Kayu SMC PAP-candidate Ng Chee Meng, who is also the secretary-general at the time, was fielded to challenge Andre Low of the major opposition Workers' Party, where both candidates brought up heated discussions relating to the unsuccessful and controversial Allianz deal with the Income Alliance in 2024 during their hustings. Ng narrowly won the election and both members were elected with Low becoming the Non-constituency Member of Parliament, making his return to parliament after his loss in the 2020 general election, and Ng become one of only a few MPs to serve non-consecutive terms; in spite of the loss, however, Ng continued his role as secretary-general as the role is separate from government roles.

==== Reception ====
In 2024, the NTUC was designated as a "politically significant person" (PSP) under the Foreign Interference (Countermeasures) Act 2021 (FICA) by the Ministry of Home Affairs (Singapore) (MHA) due to its "close nexus and symbiotic relationship" with the PAP. This close relationship has not come without criticism, with other political parties such as the Workers' Party (WP) viewing that the lack of a non-partisan and independent trade union centre in Singapore as being detrimental for the labour movement and workers rights in the country.

== List of office holders ==
=== NTUC President ===
Prior to NTUC's formation in 1961, Mahmud Awang, President of the Singapore Trades Union Congress (STUC) disbanded STUC to form NTUC, helming it as the caretaker president, before Ho See Beng became NTUC's first president.

In Office	President
1961 — 1966	Ho See Beng
1967 — 1970	Peter Vincent
1970 — 1979	Phey Yew Kok
1979 — 1981	Devan Nair
1981 — 1985	Peter Vincent
1985 — 1986	George Chua
1986 — 1997	Oscar Oliverio
1997 — 2011	John De Payva
2011 — 2015	Diana Chia
2015 — 2023	Mary Liew Kiah Eng
2023 —	K. Thanaletchimi

=== NTUC Secretary-General ===
In Office	Secretary-General
1961 — 1965	Devan Nair
1965 — 1966	Steve Nagayan
1966 — 1967	Ho See Beng
1967 — 1970	Seah Mui Kok
1970 — 1979	Devan Nair
1979 — 1983	Lim Chee Onn
1983 — 1993	Ong Teng Cheong
1993 — 2006	Lim Boon Heng
2006 — 2015	Lim Swee Say
2015 — 2018	Chan Chun Sing
2018 —	Ng Chee Meng

== NTUC Affiliated Unions and Associations ==
58 Trade Unions and 3 Trade Associations are affiliated to the National Trades Union Congress. The affiliated unions can be broadly categorised under Industrial Sector, Service Sector, Public Sector Unions and Omnibus Unions.

=== Industrial Sector Unions ===
1. Advanced Manufacturing Employees' Union (AMEU)
2. Built Environment and Urban Trades Employees' Union (BATU)
3. Chemical Industries Employees' Union (CIEU)
4. ExxonMobil Singapore Employees Union (EMSEU)
5. Keppel Employees Union (KEU)
6. Keppel FELS Employees' Union (KFEU)
7. NatSteel Employees' Union (NEU)
8. Supply Chain Employees' Union (SCEU)
9. Shipbuilding and Marine Engineering Employees' Union (SMEEU)
10. Singapore Refining Company Employees' Union (SRCEU)
11. Singapore Shell Employees' Union (SSEU-Shell)
12. United Workers of Electronics & Electrical Industries (UWEEI)
13. United Workers of Petroleum Industry (UWPI)

=== Service Sector Unions ===
1. Air Transport Executive Staff Union (AESU)
2. Attractions, Resorts & Entertainment Union (AREU)
3. Banking and Financial Services Union (BFSU)
4. Creative Media and Publishing Union (CMPU)
5. DBS Staff Union (DBSSU)
6. DNATA Singapore Staff Union (DSSU)
7. Education Services Union (ESU)
8. Food Drinks and Allied Workers Union (FDAWU)
9. Healthcare Services Employees' Union (HSEU)
10. National Transport Workers' Union (NTWU)
11. Port Officers' Union (POU)
12. Reuters Local Employees' Union, Singapore (RLEU)
13. Singapore Airport Terminal Services Workers' Union (SATSWU)
14. Singapore Bank Employees' Union (SBEU)
15. SIA Engineering Company Engineers and Executives Union (SEEU)
16. Singapore Airlines Staff Union (SIASU)
17. Singapore Insurance Employees' Union (SIEU)
18. Singapore Maritime Officers' Union (SMOU)
19. Singapore Organisation of Seamen (SOS)
20. Singapore Port Workers Union (SPWU)
21. ST Engineering Staff Union (STESU)
22. Scoot Staff Union (STSU)
23. Singapore Union of Broadcasting Employees (SUBE)
24. Staff Union of NTUC-ARU (SUN)
25. Times Publishing Group Employees' Union (TPGEU)
26. Union of Power and Gas Employees (UPAGE)
27. Union of Security Employees (USE)
28. Union of Tripartite Alliance (UTAL)
29. Union of Telecoms Employees of Singapore (UTES)

=== Public Sector Unions ===
1. Amalgamated Union of Public Employees (AUPE)
2. Amalgamated Union of Statutory Board Employees (AUSBE)
3. Enterprise Singapore Staff Union (ESSU)
4. Housing and Development Board Staff Union (HDBSU)
5. Inland Revenue Authority of Singapore Staff Union (IRASSU)
6. Ngee Ann Polytechnic Academic Staff Union (NPASU)
7. Public Utilities Board Employees' Union (PUBEU)
8. Singapore Chinese Teachers' Union (SCTU)
9. Singapore Interpreters' and Translators' Union (SITU)
10. Singapore Malay Teachers' Union (SMTU)
11. Singapore Tamil Teachers' Union (STTU)
12. Singapore Teachers' Union (STU)
13. Singapore Urban Redevelopment Authority Workers' Union (SURAWU)
14. Union of ITE Training Staff (UITS)

=== Omnibus Unions ===
1. Singapore Industrial & Services Employees' Union (SISEU)
2. The Singapore Manual & Mercantile Workers' Union (SMMWU)

=== Associations ===
1. National Taxi Association (NTA)
2. National Delivery Champions Association (NDCA)
3. National Private Hire Vehicles Association (NPHVA)
4. National Instructors and Coaches Association (NICA)
5. Singapore FinTech Association (SFA)
6. Tech Talent Assembly (TTAB)
7. Visual, Audio, Creative Content Professional Association (VICPA)

== NTUC Social Enterprises ==
NTUC Enterprise is the holding entity and single largest shareholder of the NTUC social enterprises.

The list of social enterprises includes:

- FairPrice Group
  - NTUC FairPrice
  - Kopitiam (company)
  - NTUC Foodfare
  - NTUC Link
- NTUC First Campus
- NTUC Health
- NTUC LearningHub
- NTUC Club
- Income Insurance
- Tangram Asia Capital

== Related organisations ==
The list of related organisations includes:

- Singapore Labour Foundation (SLF)
- Ong Teng Cheong Labour Leadership Institute (OTCi)
- Employment & Employability Institute (e2i)
- Consumers Association of Singapore (CASE)
- Centre for Domestic Employees (CDE)
- Migrant Workers' Centre (MWC)

== See also ==
- Labour movement of Singapore

== Sources ==
- ICTUR; et al., eds. (2005). Trade Unions of the World (6th ed.). London, UK: John Harper Publishing. ISBN 0-9543811-5-7.
- NTUC (4 September 2007). "NTUC Union Membership Core Benefits". NTUC. Archived from the original on 8 November 2007.
