= Lim Chee Onn =

Singaporean cabinet minister (born 1944)

Lim Chee Onn DUNU DUBC
- 林子安

Chairman of the National Heritage Board
- In office June 1993 – 1 August 2002
- Preceded by: Position established
- Succeeded by: Tommy Koh

Minister in the Prime Minister's Office
- In office 15 September 1980 – 1 August 1983
- Prime Minister: Lee Kuan Yew
- Preceded by: Position established

Secretary-General of the National Trades Union Congress
- In office May 1979 – 9 May 1983
- Deputy: Lawrence Sia; Mustafa Kadir; Wan Soon Bee
- Preceded by: Devan Nair
- Succeeded by: Ong Teng Cheong

Member of the Singapore Parliament for Marine Parade GRC
- In office 9 January 1989 – 1 December 1992 Serving with Othman Haron Eusofe, Goh Chok Tong, Matthias Yao
- Prime Minister: Lee Kuan Yew (until 1990); Goh Chok Tong (from 1990)
- Preceded by: PAP held
- Succeeded by: PAP held

Member of the Singapore Parliament for Bukit Merah
- In office 23 July 1977 – 17 August 1988
- Prime Minister: Lee Kuan Yew
- Preceded by: Lim Guan Hoo
- Succeeded by: Constituency abolished

Personal details
- Born: Lim Chee Onn; 30 July 1944 (age 82) Japanese-occupied Singapore
- Spouse: Christine Parsons (m. 1968)
- Children: 3
- Education: Harvard University (MPA); University of Glasgow (BEng); St. Joseph's Institution

Lim Chee Onn (Note: Chinese: 林子安; Jyutping: Lam^{4} Zi^{2} On^{1}; pinyin: Lín Zǐ'ān) (born 30 July 1944) is a Singaporean former politician who serves as a member of the Council of Presidential Advisers and chancellor of Singapore Management University.

Trained as a naval architect, Lim began his career in the Singapore Civil Service, and subsequently became an elected Member of Parliament (MP) for Bukit Merah Constituency from 1977 to 1988, and for Marine Parade Group Representation Constituency (GRC) from 1989 to 1992. From 1979 to 1983, Lim was the secretary-general of the National Trades Union Congress; he was concurrently a Minister in the Prime Minister's Office from 1980 to 1983.

After leaving the Cabinet, Lim moved into corporate leadership and chaired major Singaporean companies, such as China–Singapore Suzhou Industrial Park Development Company from 1994 to 1999, and Keppel from 2000 to 2008.

== Early life and education ==
In July 1944, Lim Chee Onn and a twin brother were born in Japanese-occupied Singapore. His mother, from Kwangtung, China, worked as a salesperson. His father was educated in English and worked at Eu Yan Sang. The father and brother died of illness later in the Japanese occupation of Singapore.

Lim attended Saint Anthony's Boys' School. From 1959 to 1962, he was educated at St. Joseph's Institution. In 1961, Lim obtained a Senior Cambridge. After finishing school in 1962, he worked as a condensed milk salesperson, selling it at the back of a van. Later, Lim worked as a substitute teacher at Beatty Secondary School.

In 1963, Lim attended a scholarship interview by the Public Service Commission (PSC) and received a Colombo Plan scholarship in September to study naval architecture at the University of Glasgow. Prior to the final examination, one of his professors, who was an eminent naval architect, recommended Lim to stay at the university and complete a fully-funded doctorate. As expatriates were leaving the marine department in Singapore, PSC denied the request, but allowed Lim to gain work experience. Upon graduation, he worked as a naval architect at Ocean in Liverpool, England.

In 1974, Lim received a scholarship from the Port of Singapore Authority to study at Harvard University, where he completed a Master of Public Administration.

== Career ==
=== Civil career ===
In 1968, Lim joined the Marine Department. Being unhappy with his job, he subsequently requested a transfer. In 1971, Lim was transferred to the administrative service as a marine adviser to the Ministry of Communications.

In 1975, Lim was promoted to deputy secretary. On 28 February 1977, he led the Singapore delegation in a negotiation with the United States to secure landing rights for Los Angeles International Airport. However, it was reported on 5 March 1977 that the negotiation had ended two days ago without an agreement being reached.

=== Political career ===
==== 4th Parliament (1977–1980) ====
In June 1977, Lim was rumoured to be the People's Action Party (PAP) candidate for the 1977 by-elections. When contacted by New Nation, Lim replied that it was "too early to make any statement". On 5 July 1977, Lim's candidacy was confirmed by the party. His opponent was Lee Siew Choh. On 17 July 1977, Lim was given an endorsement by Prime Minister Lee Kuan Yew, who said Lim was a "promising officer in the administrative service" and was reluctantly removed to stand for elections. On 23 July 1977, Lim received 72.2% of the 16,482 votes in the Bukit Merah Constituency, and was elected as a member of the 4th Parliament.

In August 1977, Lim was appointed as a deputy director in the National Trades Union Congress (NTUC), reporting directly to Devan Nair. In December 1977, Lim said that Singapore would experience increased crime and economic stagnation if drug abuse is not reduced.

From 1978 to 1980, Lim was the political secretary for the Ministry of Science and Technology.

In January 1979, he was also appointed vice-chairman of the PAP's election committee, in anticipation of the 1979 Singaporean by-elections. In February 1979, Lim was elected to PAP's Central Executive Committee (CEC) as an assistant treasurer. In March 1979, he was appointed as deputy secretary-general of NTUC. On 11 March 1979, Lim was part of the delegation (Note: Namely, Othman Wok, Lee Khoon Choy, Goh Chok Tong, S. Dhanabalan, Tony Tan, Bernard Chen, Ngiam Tong Dow, Sim Kee Boon, S. R. Nathan, and Wong Hung Khim.) led by Lee Kuan Yew to visit developments on Batam.

During a debate on extending secondary education to five years, Lim urged parents to recognise that their children may not have similar interests or capabilities compared to others, and suggested to establish an inter-ministry committee to look at how each ministry can contribute to a child's development.

On 15 September 1980, Lim was appointed as a minister without portfolio in the fifth Lee Kuan Yew cabinet. According to the Prime Minister's Office, Lim was appointed to preserve relations between PAP and NTUC, and to allow union workers to be considered in cabinet decisions. In October 1980, Lim was one of the eight members (Note: The four PAP representatives were namely, Ong Teng Cheong, Goh Chok Tong, Ahmad Mattar, and S. Dhanabalan. The other three NTUC representatives were namely, Devan Nair, Peter Vincent, and Eric Cheong) in a newly created NTUC-PAP liaison committee. Lim was also appointed as deputy chairman of the party's election committee. In December 1980, Lim was re-elected into PAP's CEC. He also called himself the "matchmaker of Singapore", while announcing the establishment of 20 working committees between companies and unions.

During the 1980 general election, Lim stood as a candidate for Bukit Merah, and he won unopposed.

==== 5th Parliament (1981–1984) ====
In the 5th Parliament, Lim remained as a minister without portfolio. On 3 January 1981, Lim officiated the opening of a S$30,000 basketball court at Bukit Merah Community Centre, and he said that young Singaporeans should not take benefits from the government for granted. In June 1981, Lim was a subscriber to SLF Properties, a newly-formed private limited company by the Singapore Labour Foundation (SLF). In July 1981, Lim was a founding member of the National Transport Workers' Union, and he was elected to the executive council. Other members included Minister for Trade and Industry Tony Tan and NTUC's president Devan Nair.

After the 1981 Anson by-election, J. B. Jeyaretnam challenged Prime Minister Lee Kuan Yew to a public, televised debate. On behalf of Lee, Lim rejected Jeyaretnam's request, and asked for elaboration on the suggestions made by the Jeyaratnam and his political party, the Workers' Party.

On 19 January 1982, Lim was appointed as a life trustee of Welcome, a supermarket by NTUC. Speaking at a conference in June 1982, Lim felt that the "colonial concept" of daily-rated workers limited employer-employee relationships, and proposed changing these workers to a monthly salary instead. On 24 June 1982, Lim called for a boycott against Australian goods for one month, after the Seamen's Union of Australia (SUA) detained Pacific Viking, a Singapore-registered cargo ship, for poor safety standards. He said that "it will be a concerted effort by our 61 unions to show the SUA and its friends that we condemn their protectionist action". 17 days later, Lim announced that the boycott would be lifted on 12 July 1982, and said that NTUC "will not hesitate to act again" if SUA were to repeat such actions.

On 15 November 1982, Lim was re-elected into PAP's CEC. On 10 December 1982, he was invited by National University of Singapore Student Union president Vivian Balakrishnan to give a talk about trade unions to students.

Lim remained as a minister without portfolio, while pending assignment to a new ministry. Lim also resigned as chairman of NTUC Comfort, deputy chairman of SLF, and other trade union positions. On 22 July 1983, in a letter Lee, Lim rejected the new posting and resigned as cabinet minister.

On 1 August 1983, Lim was assigned as a backbencher in parliament. He also resigned as vice-chairman and second organising secretary of PAP.

During the 1984 general election, Lim remained as a candidate in Bukit Merah, and he won unopposed.

==== 6th Parliament (1985–1988) ====
On 15 February 1985, Lim was appointed as a board member of the Urban Redevelopment Authority. In June 1985, he was also appointed as chairman of the public accounts committee of the 6th Parliament, which scrutinises the government expenditure.

In a 1988 National Day speech, Prime Minister Lee singled Lim as the type of person Singapore needs in times of crises. Lee said:

He has been in the Cabinet, he has been secretary-general of the NTUC. You throw that away? And just to look after Keppel? I think that's a crime! Keppel can find somebody else, but Singapore cannot find another MP like that and we want an MP like that. In a crisis, such people matter.

During the 1988 general election, Lim remained as a candidate in Bukit Merah, and his opponent was Pok Lee Chuen of the Workers' Party. Lim received 9,414 votes and won the election.

==== 7th Parliament (1989–1991) ====
On 9 January 1989, Lim was sworn into the 7th Parliament, and he was reappointed as chairman of the public accounts committee. On 11 May 1990, Lim was appointed as chairman of Steamers Maritime Holdings. For the 1991 general election, he stood as one of the candidates in the Marine Parade Group Representation Constituency. Lim and his team won the election with 77.2% of the votes.

On 6 January 1992, Lim was sworn into the 8th Parliament. He resigned on 1 December 1992, citing hypertension and corporate work as the reasons for resignation, and he did not stand as a candidate for the 1992 Marine Parade by-election.

=== Business ===
In February 1978, Lim was appointed as a director of Singapore Bus Services. In June 1978, Lim was appointed as chairman of NTUC Comfort.

On 1 August 1982, Lim was appointed as a board member of the SAFRA National Service Association.

In May 1979, Lim succeeded Devan Nair as secretary-general of NTUC, making him the first youngest leader of NTUC. In September 1979, as part of the Speak Mandarin Campaign, Lim urged all union officials to converse in Mandarin Chinese, instead of Chinese dialects.

In April 1983, NTUC board members told Prime Minister Lee that they had a lack of rapport with Lim due to his "natural reticence", and they preferred Ong Teng Cheong as secretary-general. As such, Lee removed Lim from his position, and he was replaced by Ong on 9 May 1983.

On 1 September 1983, Lim joined Keppel as a managing director of shipping. In October 1983, he was appointed as a board member of Straits Steamship, a subsidiary of Keppel. In April 1984, Lim was promoted to become managing director of Straits Steamship.

On 4 May 1993, Lim stepped down as chairman of Steamers Maritime, and he was succeeded by Cyril Neville Watson. In June 1993, Lim was appointed as the inaugural chairman of the National Heritage Board (NHB). In August 1993, Lim was also appointed as chairman of the China–Singapore Suzhou Industrial Park Development Company, a joint venture entity between China and Singapore for the Suzhou Industrial Park. In October 1995, he was given a Jiangsu honorary citizenship.

On 1 June 1996, Lim was appointed as a non-executive board director of Singapore Airlines. On 1 January 1997, Lim succeeded Sim Kee Boon as chairman of Straits Steamship Land, which was later renamed to Keppel Land. On 15 October 1998, Lim was appointed as a board member of the Monetary Authority of Singapore (MAS).

On 1 January 2000, Lim became executive chairman of Keppel and Keppel TatLee Bank, succeeding Sim. In an interview to Bloomberg News, Sim said that Lim is "tenacious" and has "very good networking abilities both in the Government and in the region". On 1 August 2002, Lim was succeeded by Tommy Koh as chairman of NHB.

On 2 January 2008, Lim was appointed by President S. R. Nathan as an alternate member in the Council of Presidential Advisers (CPA). On 30 June 2009, he stepped down as chairman of Keppel, and he was replaced by Lee Boon Yang. Lim remained as a senior advisor.

In April 2017, Lim was appointed by President Tony Tan as a member in CPA. On 31 May 2018, Lim stepped down as a board member of MAS. On 1 August 2019, Lim was appointed as chancellor of Singapore Management University, succeeding J. Y. Pillay.

== Personal life ==
Lim is Catholic.

While studying in Glasgow, Lim met Christine Parsons, who was from Cheshire, England. In 1968, Lim married Parsons and they have three children.

== Awards and decorations ==
- Order of Nila Utama (with High Distinction), in 2019.
- Commander of the Order of the Crown, in 2008.
- Distinguished Service Order, in 2007.

On 11 July 2002, Lim was awarded an honorary degree of Doctor of Engineering by the University of Glasgow.

== Publications ==
- Lim, Chee Onn (10 December 1977). THE ROLE OF TRADE UNIONS IN THE FURTHER INDUSTRIALISATION OF SINGAPORE (PDF). LOCAL ENTREPRENEURSHIP AND FURTHER INDUSTRIALISATION OF SINGAPORE – via National Archives of Singapore.
- Lim, Chee Onn (1979). Singapore Industrial Development Strategy - The Whys & Wherefores. Singapore: National Trades Union Congress.
- Lim, Chee Onn (November 1980). Work and excel for an even better quality of life: NTUC's position paper. NTUC Ordinary Delegates Conference. Singapore: National Trades Union Congress. ISBN 9789971941857. OCLC 13159668.
- Lim, Chee Onn (1980). Progress into the '80s: Secretary-General's Report to the Adjourned 3rd Triennial Delegates Conference of the NTUC, incorporating the NTUC Plan of Action for the '80s. National Trades Union Congress. LCCN 85940146. OCLC 12641259.

== Notes ==
Political offices
New title	Minister in the Prime Minister's Office; 1980–1983	Vacant Title next held by Lim Boon Heng
Parliament of Singapore
Preceded by Lim Guan Hoo	Member of Parliament for Bukit Merah; 1977–1988	Constituency abolished
Preceded by Choo Wee Khiang; Othman Haron Eusofe; Goh Chok Tong	Member of Parliament for Marine Parade GRC; 1989–1992; Served alongside: Othman Haron Eusofe, Goh Chok Tong, Matthias Yao	Succeeded by Teo Chee Hean; Othman Haron Eusofe; Goh Chok Tong; Matthias Yao
Trade union offices
Preceded by Devan Nair	Secretary-general of the National Trades Union Congress; 1979–1983	Succeeded by Ong Teng Cheong
