= Chng Hee Kok =

Singaporean politician

Chng Hee Kok (Note: Chinese: 庄熙国; Pe̍h-ōe-jī: Chng Hi-kok; pinyin: Zhuāng Xīguó) (born 1948) was a Member of the 6th, 7th 8th and 9th Parliaments of Singapore, where he has been in Radin Mas from 1984 to 1988, Tiong Bahru GRC (Radin Mas) from 1988 to 1991, Tampines GRC (Changkat South) from 1991 to 1997 and East Coast GRC (Fengshan) from 1997 to 2001.

Chng is a graduate of the National University of Singapore.
