= Marsal Maun =

Bruneian civil servant and educator (1913–2000)

Dato Seri Paduka Marsal Maun SPMB DSNB POAS PJK
- مرسل ماون
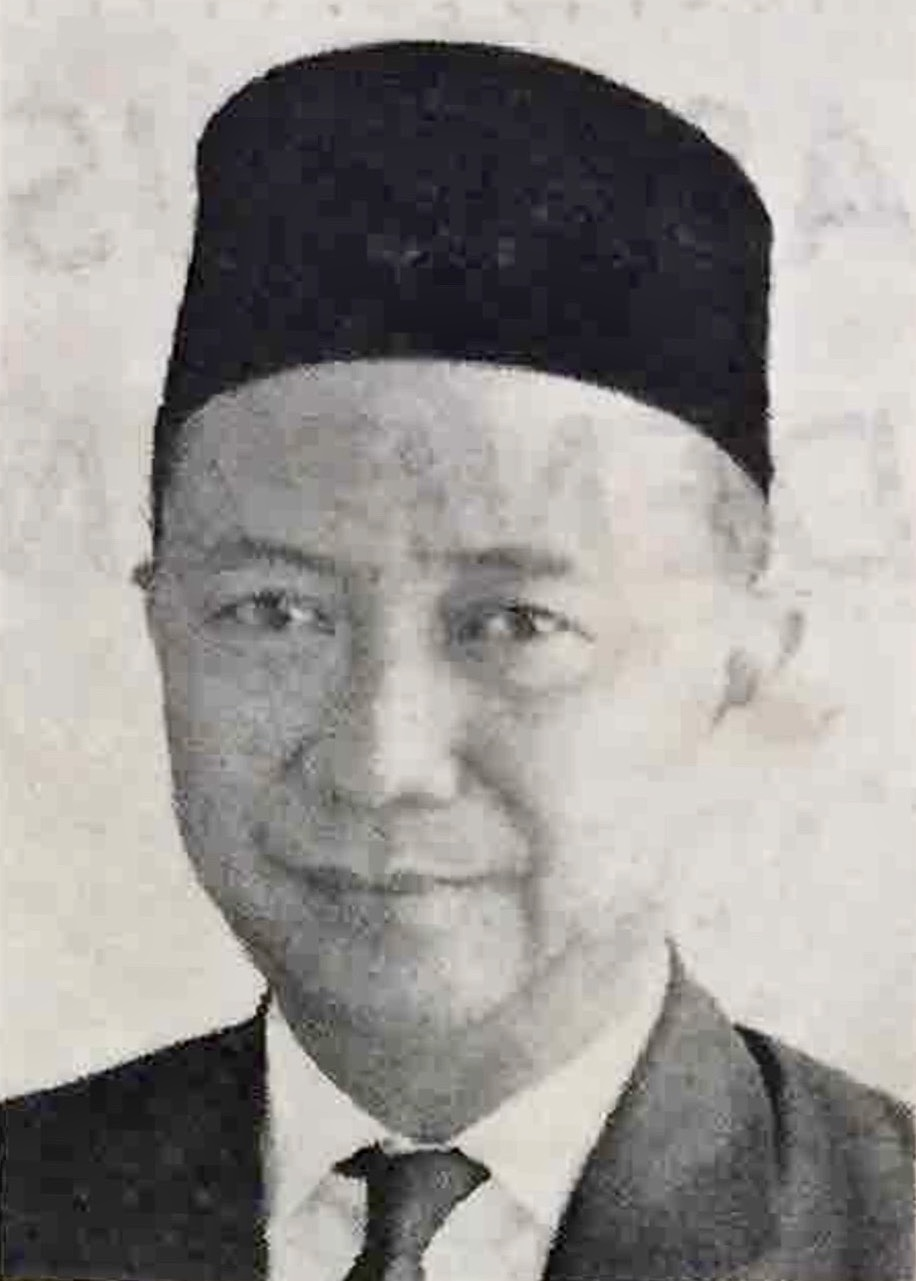
- Marsal, c. 1964

2nd Menteri Besar of Brunei
- In office 1 September 1962 – 4 November 1968
- Monarchs: Hassanal Bolkiah; Omar Ali Saifuddien III
- Deputy: Pengiran Muhammad Ali
- Preceded by: Ibrahim Mohammad Jahfar
- Succeeded by: Pengiran Muhammad Yusuf

Personal details
- Born: 8 November 1913 Kampong Pulau Ambok, Brunei Town, Brunei
- Died: 2000 (aged 86–87)
- Resting place: Telanai 'A' Muslim Cemetery, Bandar Seri Begawan, Brunei
- Spouse: Zubaidah Othman
- Education: Sultan Idris Training College
- Profession: Civil servant; teacher

Marsal bin Maun (Note: The former spelling of his patronymic name is "Ma'un" rather than "Maun.") (8 November 1913 – 2000) was a civil servant and educator. He served as deputy state secretary from 1960 to 1962 before becoming Brunei's second menteri besar (chief minister) from 1962 to 1968.

In 1933, Marsal founded the Brunei Darussalam Scouts Association (PPNBD). He was the first of the "Three M's" or "Three Musketeers" (Note: Not to be confused with another set of "Three Musketeers," Sulaiman Damit, Mohammad Daud, and Awangku Ibnu Basit earned the nickname after being selected for officer cadet training at the Federation Military College in Malaya in 1960.) feared by the British government, alongside Pengiran Muhammad Ali and Pengiran Muhammad Yusuf. As a prominent member of the Brunei Malay Teachers Association (PGGMB) and a close confidant of Sultan Omar Ali Saifuddien III, he played a crucial role in shaping the discussions that led to the adoption of the 1959 constitution of Brunei.

Marsal's tenure as chief minister was marked by a turbulent period, particularly due to his strong opposition to Malaysia. He was widely credited with shaping Brunei's negotiating position in refusing to join the Federation of Malaysia in 1962, which contrasted with the views of many Legislative Council (LegCo) members who supported Malaysia's inclusion, despite concerns over Kuala Lumpur's demands. This period of political tension was further compounded by the Brunei revolt in 1962, which added to the challenges faced during his leadership.

== Early life and education ==
Marsal bin Maun was born on 8 November 1913 in Kampong Pulau Ambok, now known as Kampong Pintu Malim, Brunei Town. He received his early education at the Jalan Pemancha Malay School from 1923 to 1929. After passing the primary 4 exam, he was appointed as a probationary teacher. In 1930, he traveled to British Malaya with Basir Taha to pursue a three-year teacher training program at the Sultan Idris Training College (SITC) in Tanjong Malim. He became one of the first two Bruneians to qualify as a teacher from the institution in 1933.

== Career ==
=== Early career ===
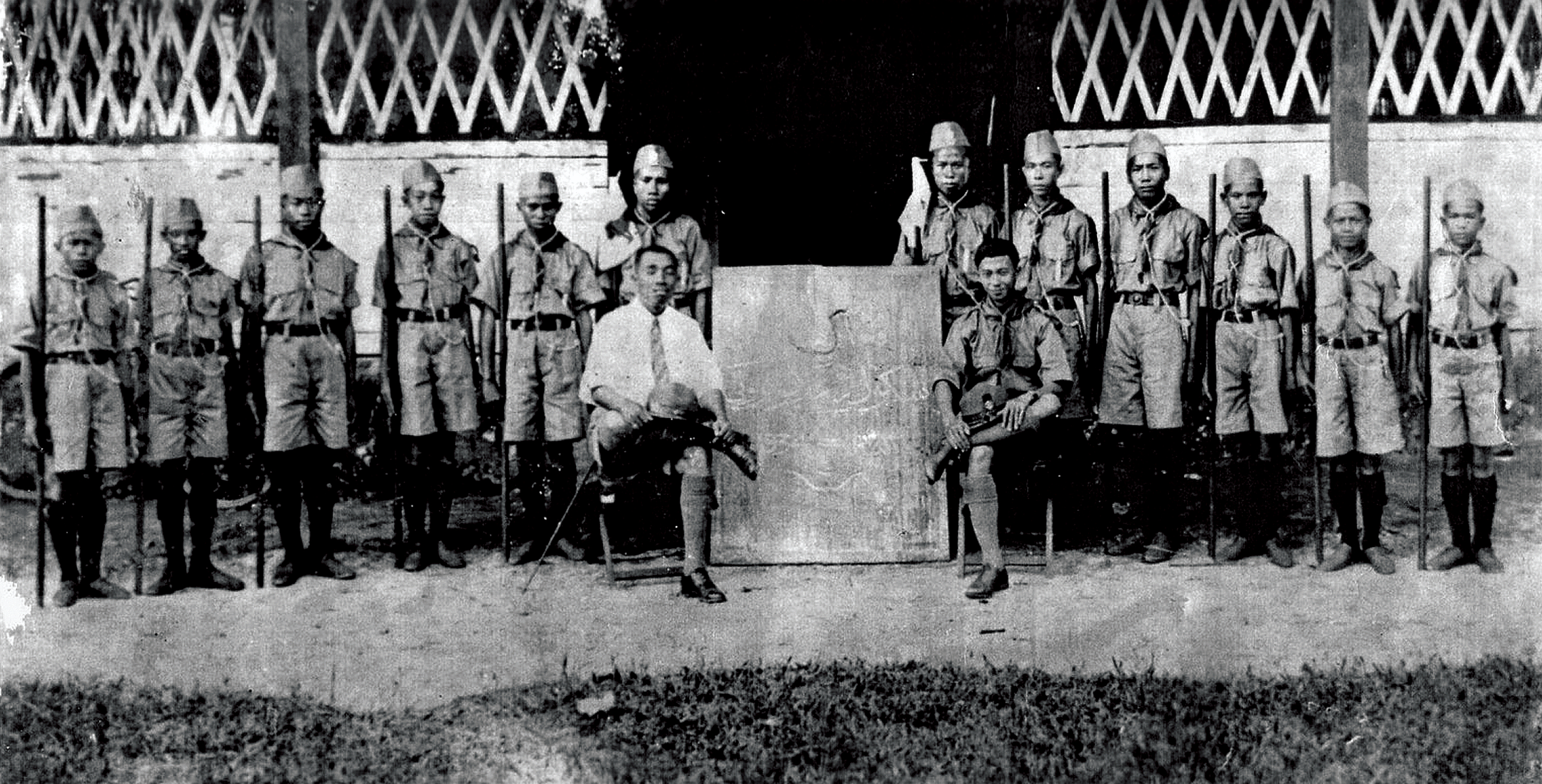
Marsal (seated on the right) alongside the 1933 Brunei Scouts

After returning in 1933, Marsal began his career as an assistant teacher at Jalan Pemancha Malay School. During his time there, he founded the PPNBD and served as its assistant leader, establishing the foundation for the Scout Movement in Brunei. He continued teaching until January 1935, when he was appointed acting superintendent of education, a position he was officially confirmed in by 1936. That same year, he was also an active member of PSPB, a nonpolitical organisation, which played a role in Brunei's early social and civic movements. Marsal made significant improvements to religious education in Brunei, incorporating it into the daily school schedule and increasing its frequency to twice a week instead of just once. In 1937, he co-founded the PGGMB with other teachers from the SITC, and the organisation was officially registered in 1939.

=== Japanese occupation of Brunei ===
During the Japanese occupation of Brunei, he was involved with the Japanese Propaganda Department but was later suspended by the British Military Administration (BMA) and the British Residency until September 1946. Following World War II, he was among several Malay officers detained by the BMA on charges of collaborating with the Japanese. The BMA, influenced by non-Malay groups and unfamiliar with local customs, removed many Malay-educated officials in favour of English-speaking candidates, causing significant dissatisfaction among the Malay community. However, some officials, including T. S. Monks, questioned the legitimacy of these accusations. On 9 March 1948, as a key opposition figure, Marsal pointed out that many civil servants hesitated to challenge British policies due to fear of repercussions. He also noted widespread distrust of British efforts to integrate Brunei with Sarawak, as many locals favoured federation with the Federation of Malaya instead, reflecting the conservative outlook of Brunei's population.

=== State councillor and the constitution ===
Marsal played a crucial role in Brunei's resistance against British colonial rule in the early 1950s. Working closely with Sultan Omar Ali Saifuddien III, Pengiran Yusuf, and Jamil Al-Sufri, he actively opposed British efforts to introduce a codified constitution. Like many Malay-trained educators with ties to the Japanese occupation, he became a vocal critic of British rule, subtly challenging their authority. Before attending SITC in 1949 and 1950, he served as an education adviser to the assistant British Resident in Kuala Belait. Upon his return, he was reinstated as superintendent of Malay education.

During Brunei's early constitutional reforms, Marsal became a member of the newly established District Advisory Councils (DAC) in September 1954, which played a key role in advising the sultan's government. He became an outspoken critic of the government, using this platform to challenge its policies in the State Council, where he was appointed as an observer that same year. Sworn in on 17 November 1954, he quickly emerged as one of the council's most vocal members and, alongside other educators, transformed the council from a passive body into an active platform for challenging British rule.

In June 1956, during John Orman Gilbert's leave, Dennis White briefly served as acting British Resident in Brunei, with Anthony Abell hoping White's arrival would improve relations between the British administration and the State Council. Abell specifically instructed White to distance the sultan from the influence of schoolmasters Marsal and Pengiran Ali. He was part of the Brunei delegation to London for constitutional talks in 1956, which included the sultan and other key Malay members of the State Council, advised by Panglima Bukit Gantang, former Menteri Besar of Perak, and Neil Lawson, a lawyer involved in Malaya's constitutional talks. He was reappointed as an unofficial member of the State Council in 1957. According to Marsal (1957) in Hiboran magazine, a solid policy could be developed soon, most likely modeled after the one Abdul Razak Hussein suggested for the Federation of Malaya.

In February 1958, during a Special State Council meeting convened by the sultan, Marsal, Pengiran Ali, and Pengiran Yusuf were appointed to examine the draft constitution between Brunei and the British government. The council disagreed with Abell, insisting that the draft, based on feedback from the DAC, should be considered first. They proceeded to review the draft constitution without his presence and aimed to present a revised version to the British. In early May, Marsal, Pengiran Ali, and Taha Hussain proposed that Brunei withdraw from the Inter-Territorial Conference, arguing it provided no benefits. This followed the British push for closer ties with Sarawak and North Borneo, despite opposition in Brunei. The Sultan reassured his people that Brunei would not be forced into a federation, stressing patience and determination to protect the country's position. In response to the Colonial Office's inquiry, Abell sent a paper in July 1958, in which E. R. Bevington blamed Marsal, Pengiran Ali, and Pengiran Yusuf, members of the PGGMB, for causing difficulties in Brunei. Bevington noted they were key spokesmen for the sultan in the State Council, leading discussions and advocating for changes to the Constitution Enactment and draft constitution. Abell agreed, attributing the demand for changes to their influence.

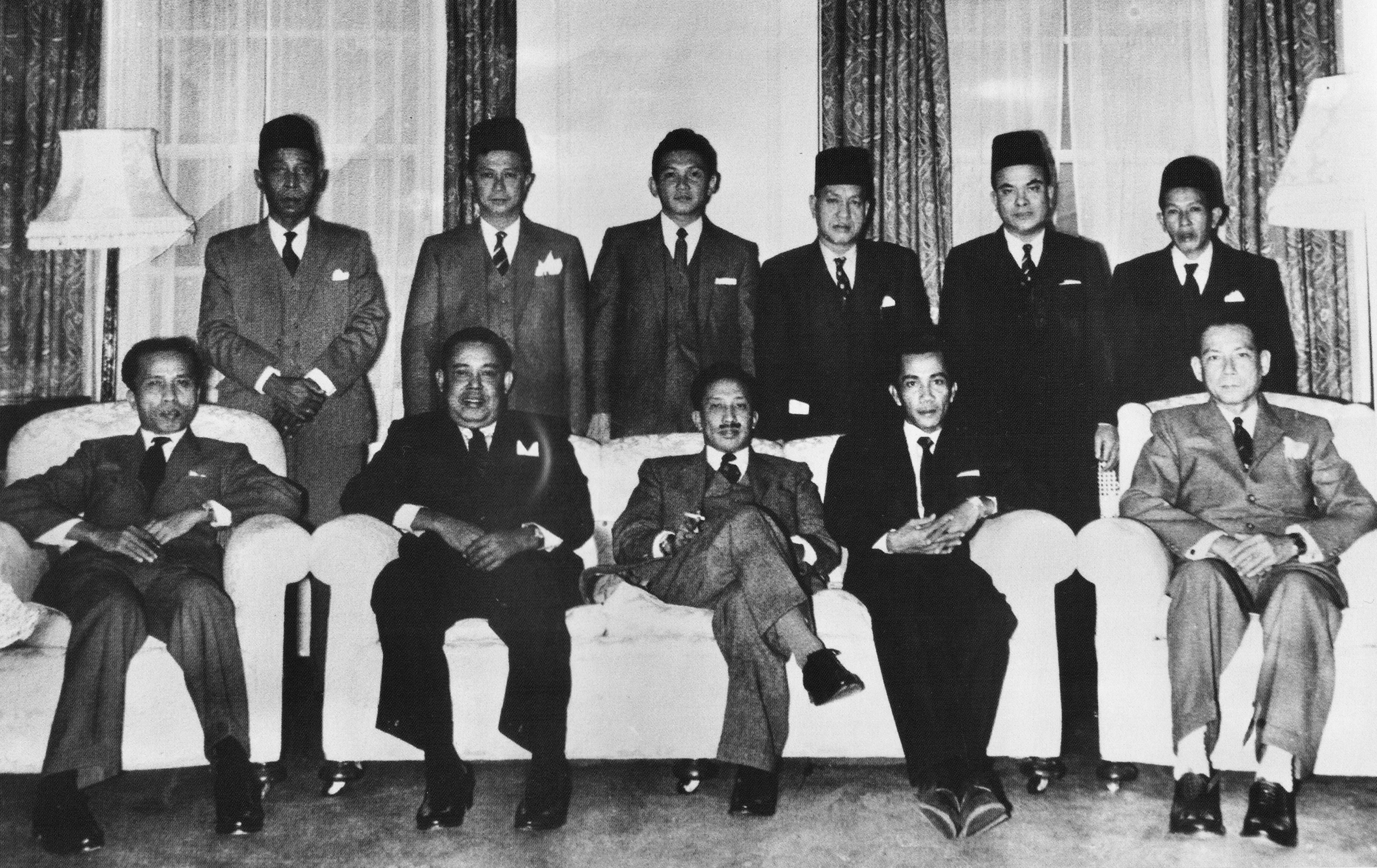
Marsal (standing second from the left) with the 1959 constitutional delegation in London

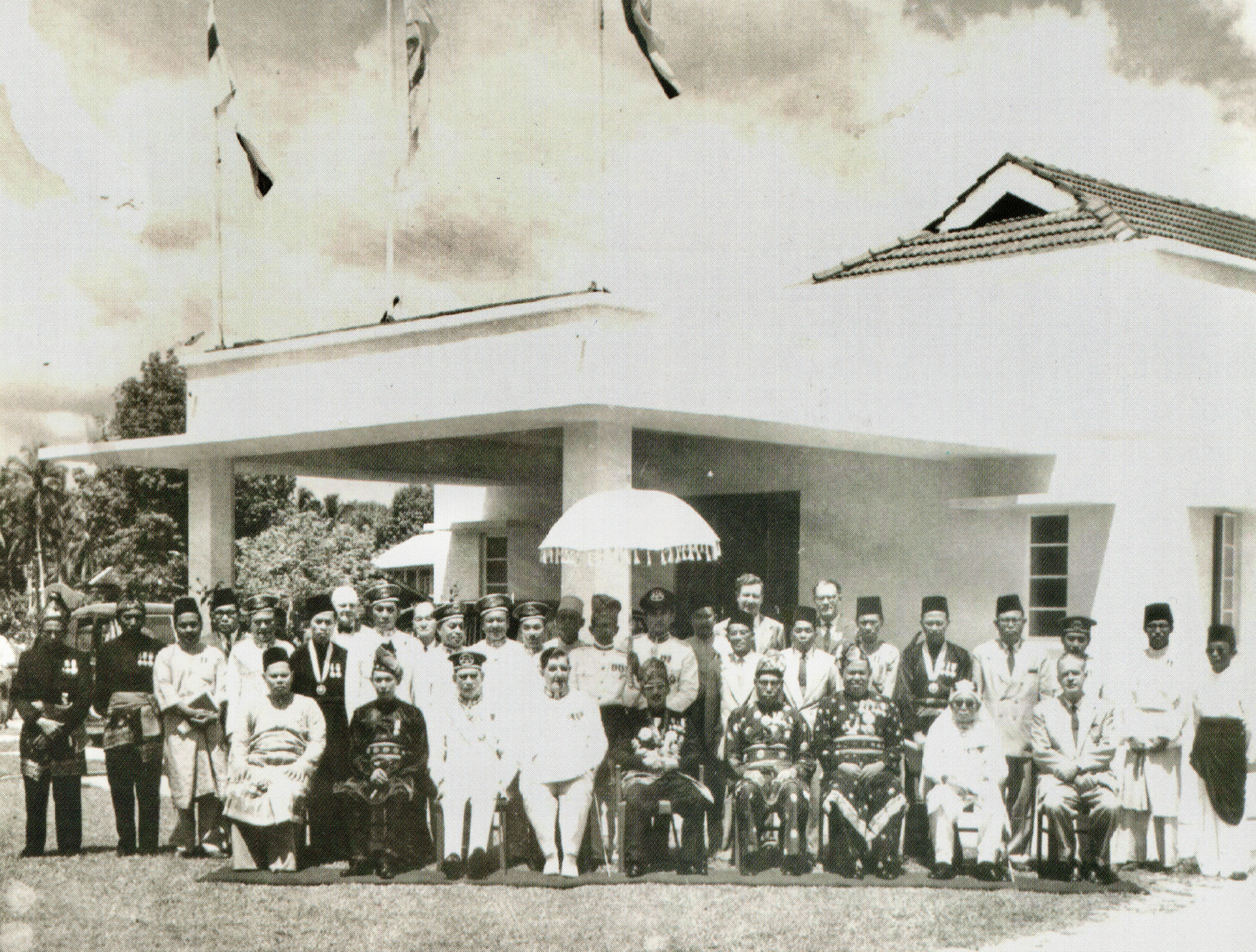
Marsal (standing fifth from the right) with the 1959 LegCo members outside the Lapau

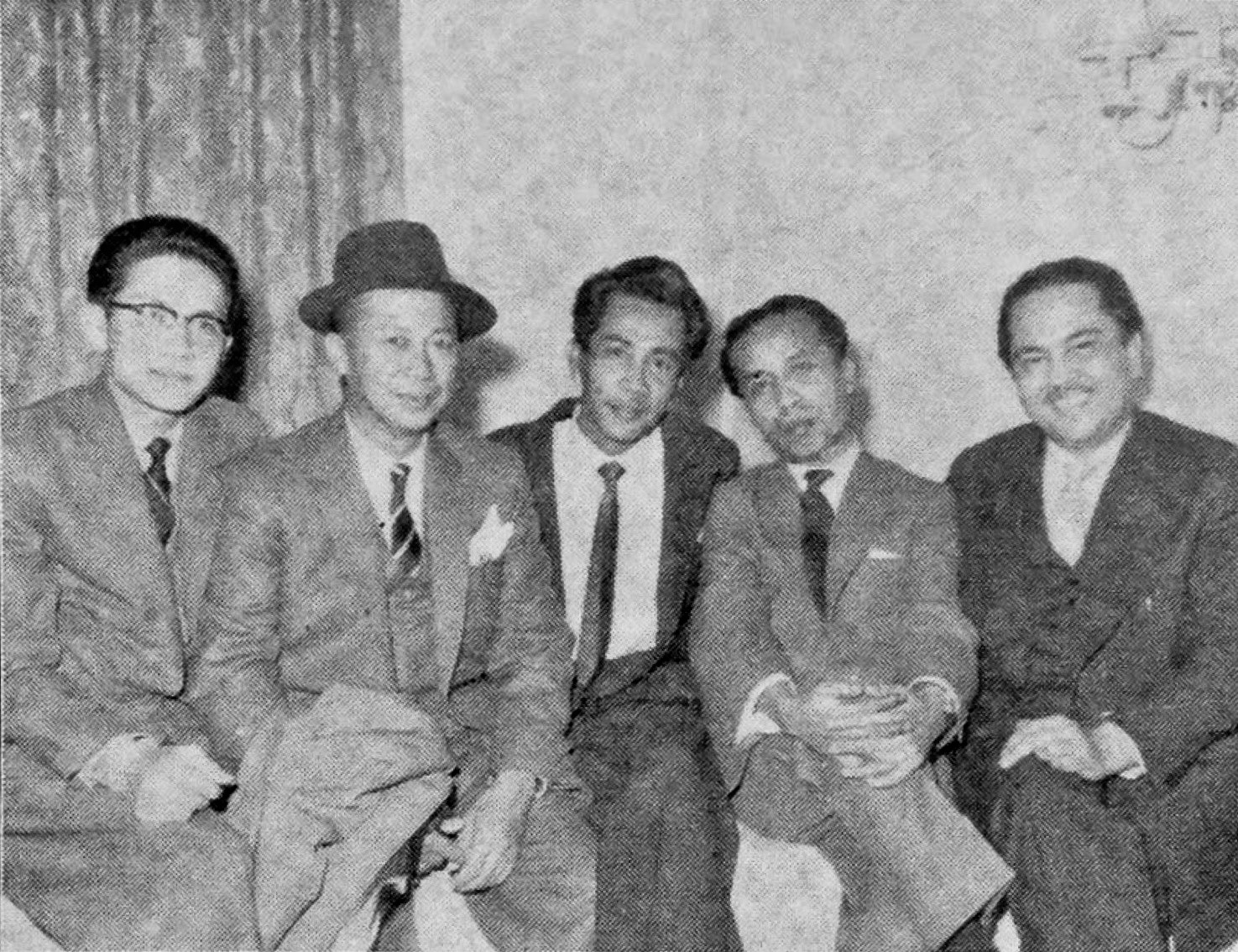
From left to right: Isa Ibrahim, Marsal, Pengiran Yusuf, Pengiran Ali, and Zaini Ahmad, at Grosvenor House Hotel in April 1959

In 1959, Marsal joined the Brunei delegation to London for constitutional negotiations, led by the sultan. He was part of the Brunei delegation at the London Conference on 23 March 1959, where discussions focused on the future constitutional arrangements for Brunei. He attended six plenary sessions, contributing alongside senior officials like Ibrahim Mohammad Jahfar, Pengiran Ali, and legal advisers. The conference aimed to address issues such as the administrative separation of Brunei and Sarawak, with Marsal playing a key role in shaping the discussions. During the First Working Party Session, Marsal voiced his dissatisfaction with the Colonial Office's suggestion of a preliminary training period for the position of chief minister, arguing that enough time had passed for such training and a suitable candidate was ready. Despite his concerns, the Brunei delegation agreed that the appointments of chief minister and state secretary should be discussed privately between the sultan and the Secretary of State for the Colonies, Alan Lennox-Boyd. Marsal later attended the signing of the written constitution and the new agreement with the United Kingdom at the Lapau on 29 September. In November, following Brunei's new constitution, Marsal was appointed an unofficial member of the Executive Council and proposed appointing Brunei Malays to senior government positions. However, when no progress was made, resentment grew towards the influx of Malayan officers, and tensions rose after a LegCo member criticised the lack of opportunities for locals in the public service.

On 23 April 1960, Marsal was appointed as one of the seven members of the Regency Council. In December 1960, he became involved in a political crisis when all sixteen unofficial members of the LegCo staged a walkout after their proposals on members' privileges and allowances were rejected by the sultan. The dispute arose over the claim that motions passed by the LegCo needed approval from the sultan-in-council, and tensions were further exacerbated by growing friction between local officers and the Malayan contingent. The crisis was resolved when the sultan agreed to meet the council members privately, leading to Marsal's promotion from superintendent of Malay schools to deputy state secretary, along with promotions for other local officers.

Marsal played a key role in maintaining government stability during the turmoil of late 1961 and early 1962. Despite his past affiliations with Partai Rakyat Brunei (PRB), White notes that he was crucial in addressing the government's inefficiencies and was a strong supporter of the sultan. In July 1961, when the sultan faced pressure over the presence of Malayan officers in Brunei, Marsal helped resolve a personnel issue. Tunku Abdul Rahman's letter put the sultan in a difficult position, as he feared appearing weak if he had to request replacements after dismissing the Malayans. To settle the matter, the sultan, accompanied by Marsal and Pengiran Ali, visited Kuala Lumpur, where they agreed to replace the Malayans with more qualified officials. On 29 July, he was also appointed by the sultan, alongside other advisers, to address internal security in the Standing Advisory Council on Defence.

=== Chief minister of Brunei ===
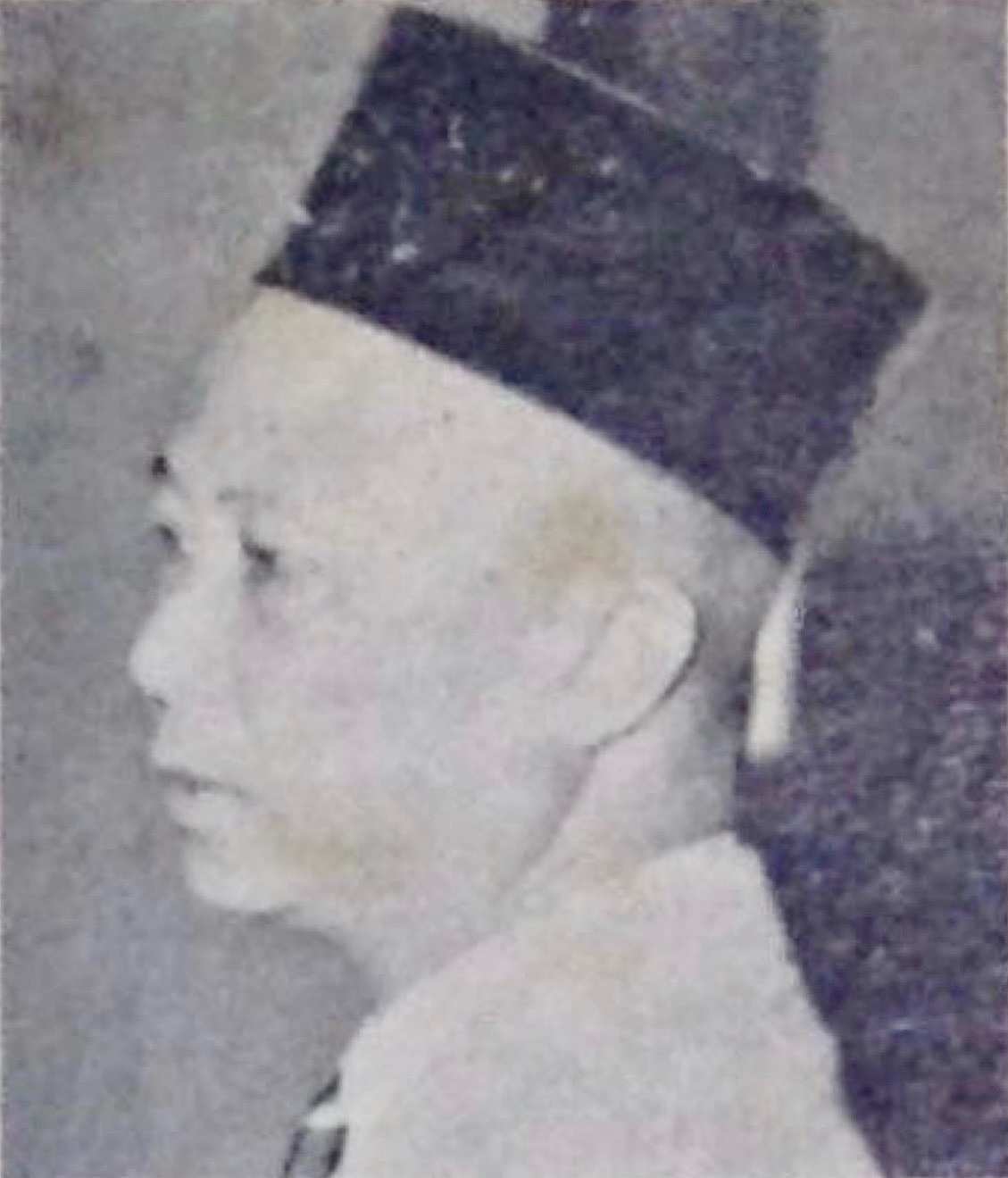
Marsal, c. 1961

On 1 August 1961, after the incumbent took leave for health reasons, Marsal was appointed acting chief minister by the sultan. His and Pengiran Yusuf's appointments raised concerns due to their nationalist views and ties to the PRB, signalling a shift in Brunei's political landscape. His promotion marked a shift towards increasing local Bruneian leadership in the civil service, reducing reliance on expatriates and Kuala Lumpur, particularly on the Malaysia issue. Along with Pengiran Yusuf and Pengiran Ali, Marsal solidified his alliance with the sultan, deepening the rift with the PRB, who viewed him as a traitor due to his close ties with the sultan and nationalist views. Despite this, he was praised for his diligence in improving Brunei's administration. He and Pengiran Yusuf worked hard to clear a significant backlog of business, including 600 files in the State Secretary's Office. Despite his lack of English, their efficiency was highly commended. During this period, the sultan indicated his intention to allow the new chief minister to lead the government, a shift confirmed by George Douglas-Hamilton, the Commissioner-General for Southeast Asia, who observed that the sultan was becoming more of a constitutional monarch under Marsal's leadership.

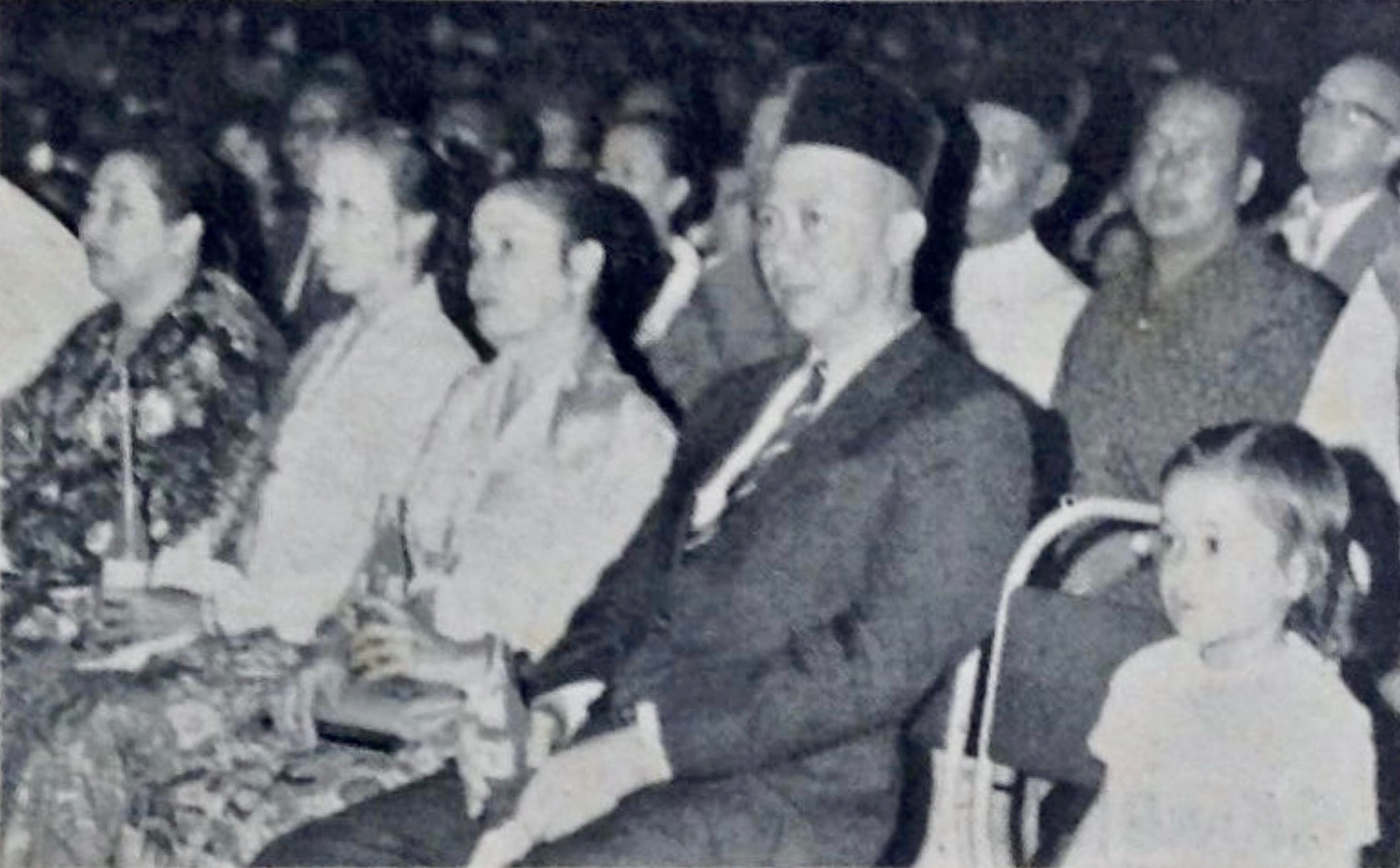
Marsal (seated second from the right) at the Malam Anika Warna event in Brunei Town, 1961

In August 1961, Douglas-Hamilton's visit failed to secure the sultan's commitment to the Malaysia Plan, as the sultan, feeling betrayed by Tunku and alarmed by a PRB demonstration, turned to his advisers, including Marsal, who were believed to favour an isolationist stance. In late November, the sultan informed the Executive Council of his decision to support the Malaysia Plan without consulting the council, and White believed he had secured the backing of Marsal, Pengiran Ali, Pengiran Yusuf, and Abdul Aziz Zain, whom he appointed to advise him. As chairman of the internal commission set up by the sultan in December 1961, he led an investigation into public opinion on Brunei joining Malaysia. In December, the sultan's speech revealed that Brunei had not yet committed to joining Malaysia, reflecting differing views among his advisers, with Abdul Aziz supporting the federation and Marsal opposing it.

The Brunei–Malaysia Commission, chaired by Marsal, was formed to assess public opinion on the Malaysia Plan. The commission included key figures such as Hong Kok Tin, Gimang Anak Parit, Lukan Uking, and Hashim Tahir. In January 1962, the commission concluded with a report showing strong opposition to the Malaysia Plan and a preference for federation with Sarawak and North Borneo. A month later, he submitted the report, which was not published due to objections from Abdul Aziz, who felt the commission should have supported the plan. Although the report was discarded and a new committee was appointed to reassess the issue, Marsal defended the decision not to release the findings, stating that the government could not be forced to do so. Despite efforts from the PRB to have the report made public, it was never released, partly because Marsal had not allowed other commission members to review or contribute to it. His decision to suppress the report, which reflected strong opposition to the Malaysia proposal, was likely a strategic move to give the government more time to persuade the public of the benefits of Malaysia.

During a meeting of the sultan's advisory council in late March 1962, Marsal was one of three members who voted against the Malaysia proposal. He also became involved in a dispute with Pengiran Ali over the Malaysia commission's report and made disparaging remarks about the Malayan officers, which strained his relationships with them. However, after reconciling with Pengiran Ali, Marsal shifted his position, moving from opposition to support for Malaysia, leaving only Noor Abdul Razak opposed. While Marsal briefly opposed the PRB, the party's strong position and the lack of political support for its goals in Sarawak and North Borneo ultimately led him to embrace the Malaysia Plan.

On 9 April 1962, Marsal stated that the Malaysia issue should not be discussed in the Legislative Council, emphasising that it was the sultan's responsibility to decide on the proposal. This contradicted the sultan's later statement that his government would make the decision. Although Marsal's view was partly supported by the sultan's reduced role in day-to-day affairs after the Officers' Affair, the sultan would likely still seek advice from his close associates and the public before making the final decision. His wavering support for the Malaysia Plan made him a key figure whose influence, particularly among the PGGMB, raised concerns about opposition, which led to discussions about reinstating the former chief minister, Ibrahim.

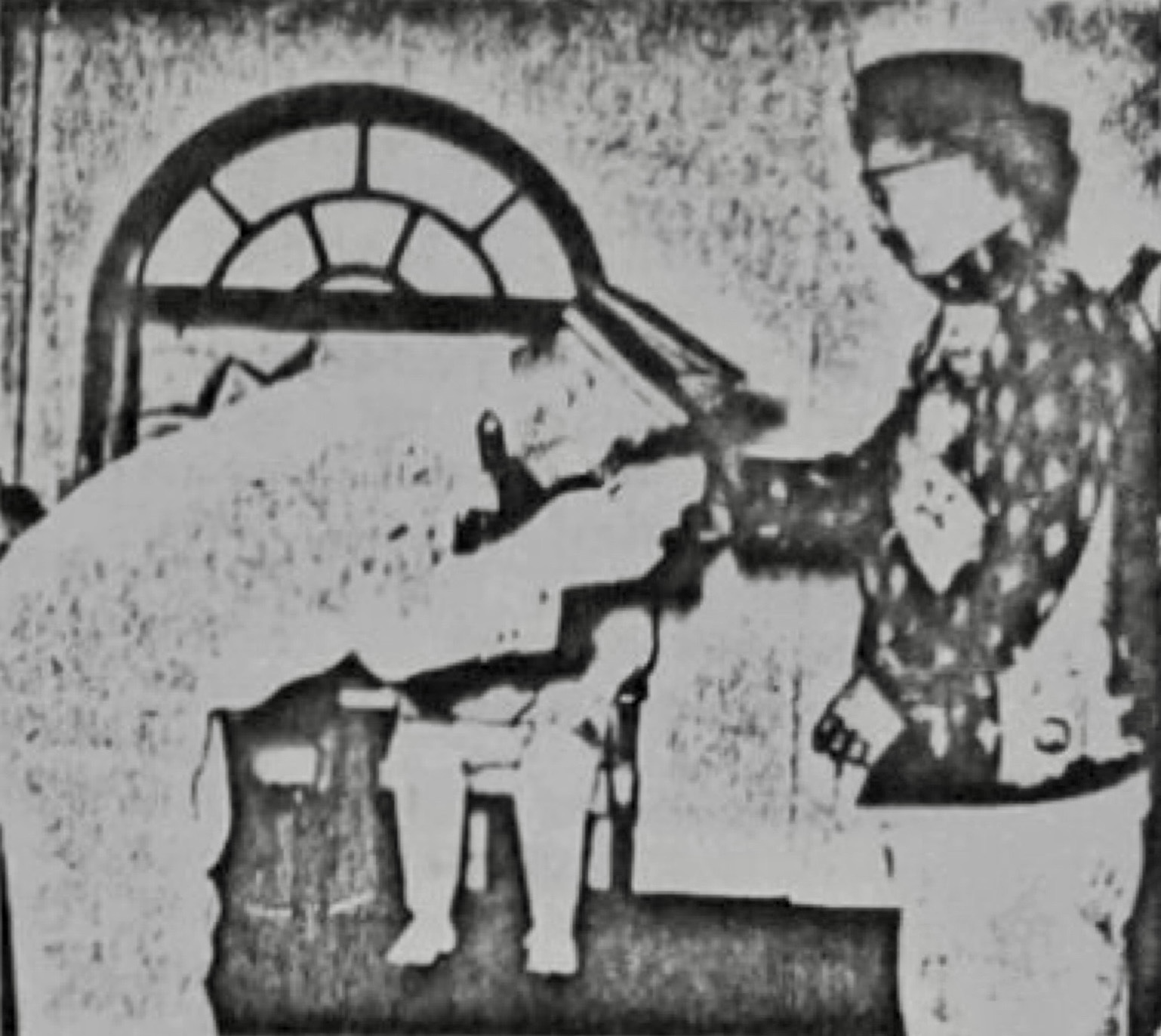
Marsal greeting Sultan Omar Ali Saifuddien III after receiving the official appointment as chief minister in 1962

Marsal was appointed chief minister on 1 August 1962, following Ibrahim's retirement, making him the second person to hold the position. By 23 September, the sultan reconfirmed Marsal as chief minister and appointed Pengiran Ali as deputy chief minister, strengthening the government in preparation for the potential inclusion of PRB members in the LegCo and Executive Council. Two days later, he led a delegation to Kuala Lumpur for final exploratory talks with the Malayan government. In the second round of talks, the Bruneian delegation, led by Marsal, found the federation's terms "unacceptable." Described as "violently opposed to Malaysia in principle," he was the driving force behind Brunei's proposals, which angered and frustrated the delegation, leading to calls for rejecting Malaysia. While the sultan was testing Kuala Lumpur's reaction, the Malayans viewed Marsal's approach as a negotiation tactic, while Lawson believed Brunei genuinely preferred a closer association.

=== Rebellion and retirement ===
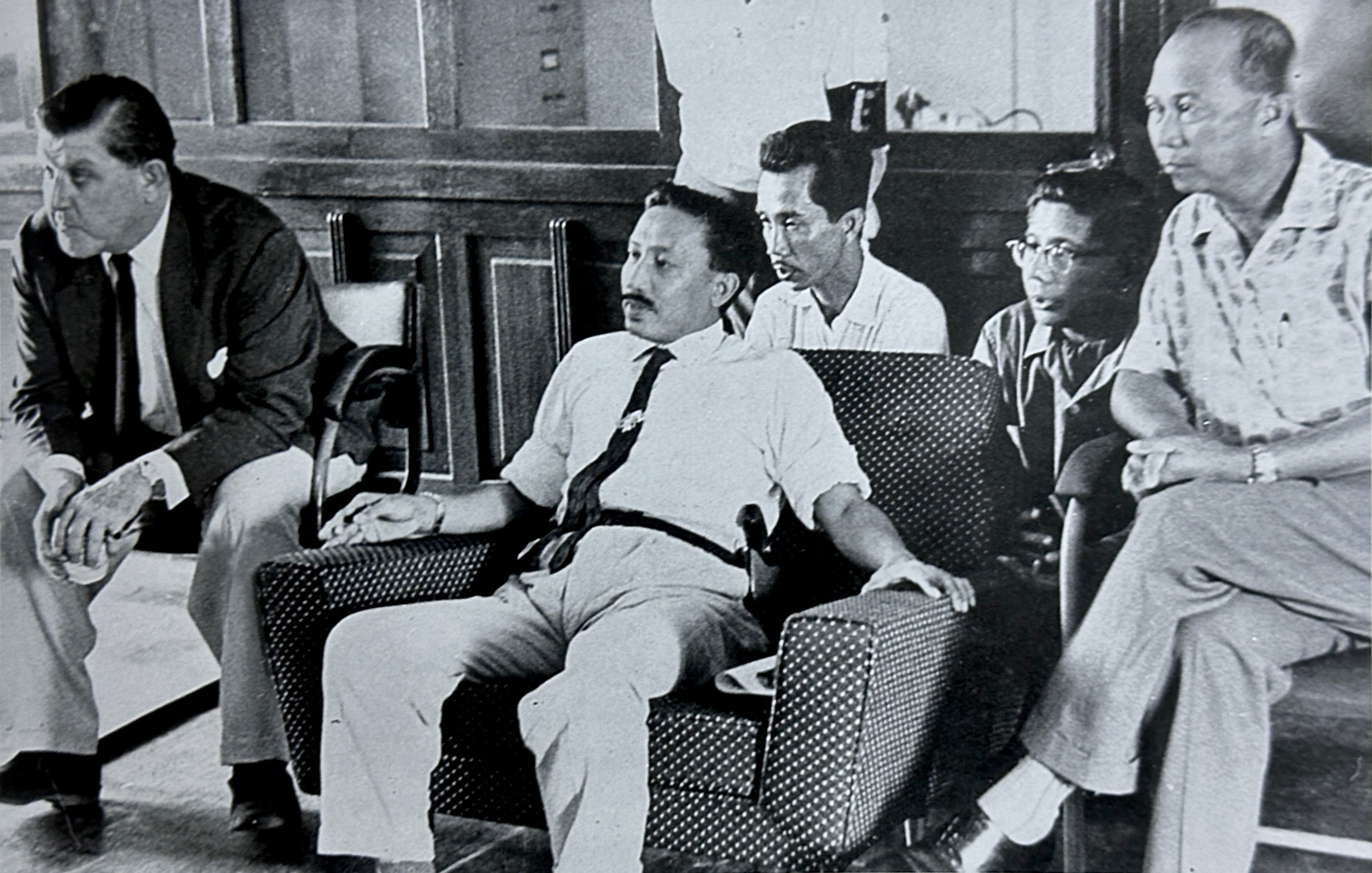
From left to right: White, the Sultan, Pengiran Yusuf, Raja Azam, and Marsal, during a press conference with foreign journalists at the State Secretary's Office building on 15 December 1962

On 7 December 1962, the acting British high commissioner in Brunei informed Marsal of an impending uprising. He quickly alerted the sultan, who instructed the police to exercise caution. The sultan also ordered the arrest of key rebel leaders, including A. M. Azahari and Zaini, who had sparked the rebellion after being denied an audience with him. Marsal instructed PRB central executive member Pengiran Metussin Lampoh and Vice President Abdul Hapidz to engage with him instead of attempting to meet with the sultan directly. After a brief altercation, they were arrested when they tried to confront him. The following morning, rebels attacked his home in Gadong. Marsal called for assistance, and a team led by Inspector Ahmad was dispatched. Upon arrival, the police were surrounded by the rebels but managed to form a defensive circle and demand their surrender. Marsal was escorted back to the station, which, though under attack, remained secure. During the assault, he had contacted police headquarters for help, and six officers, led by Inspector Ahmad, arrived. Using their knowledge of Islam, Ahmad successfully persuaded the rebels to surrender, causing them to lay down their weapons. Later that morning, he declared a statewide curfew on the radio and ordered all gun owners to turn in their weapons and licenses to the authorities. This swift response was part of the government’s efforts to suppress the rebellion.

On 10 December 1962, Marsal declared the PRB an unlawful society under the Societies Enactment, citing its actions as contrary to its stated goals and incompatible with the state's peace, order, and welfare. Over 100 rebels were killed during the conflict, which also led to a curfew, widespread rumours, and disruptions to daily life, including water rationing and school closures. The curfew was gradually lifted after two days. By 18 December, the Emergency Executive Committee, led by Marsal, was given day-to-day control of Brunei. However, many saw this as a cover for White and P. H. Meadows, who were effectively in charge of the state.

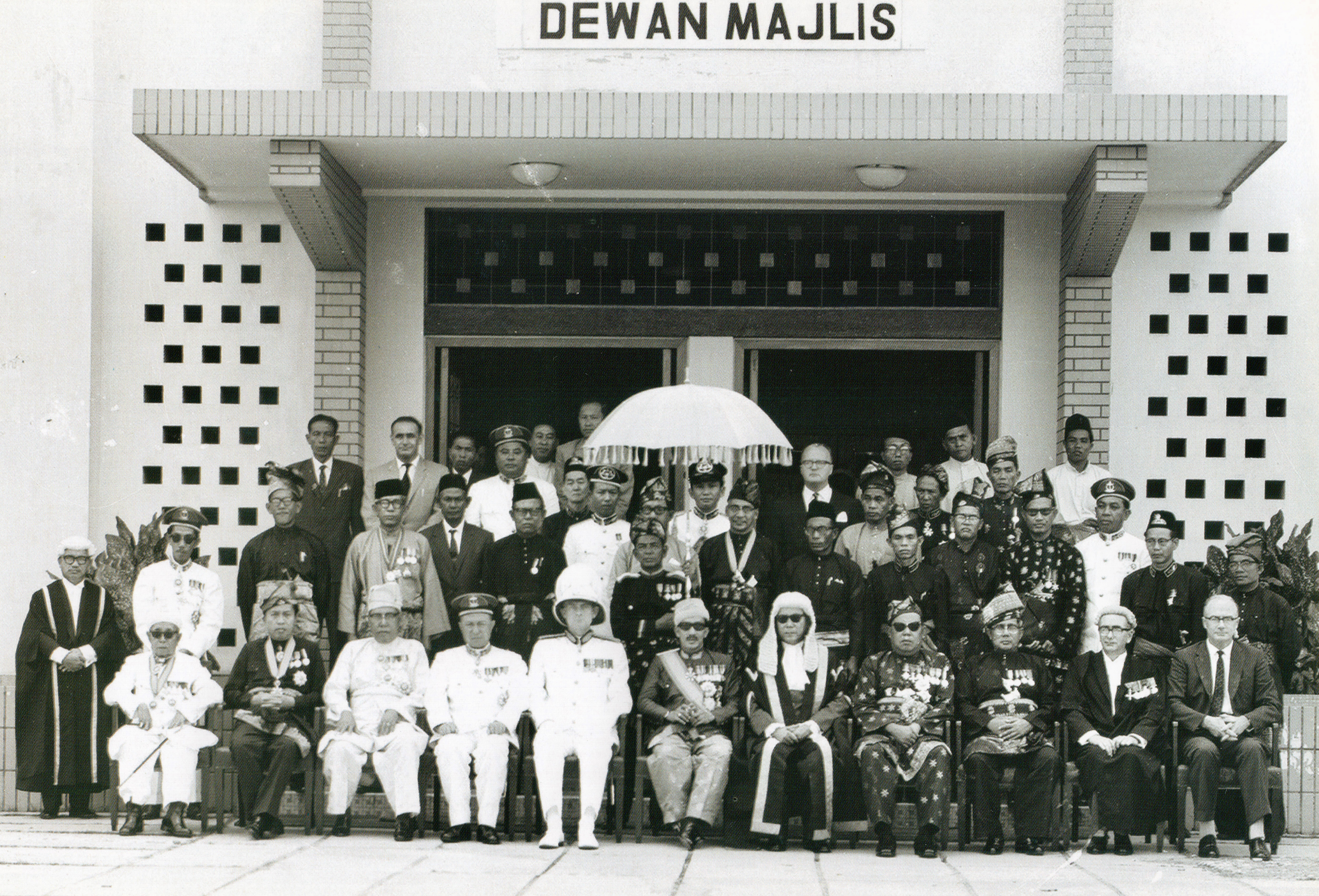
Marsal (seated fourth from the left) with the members of the 1963 LegCo

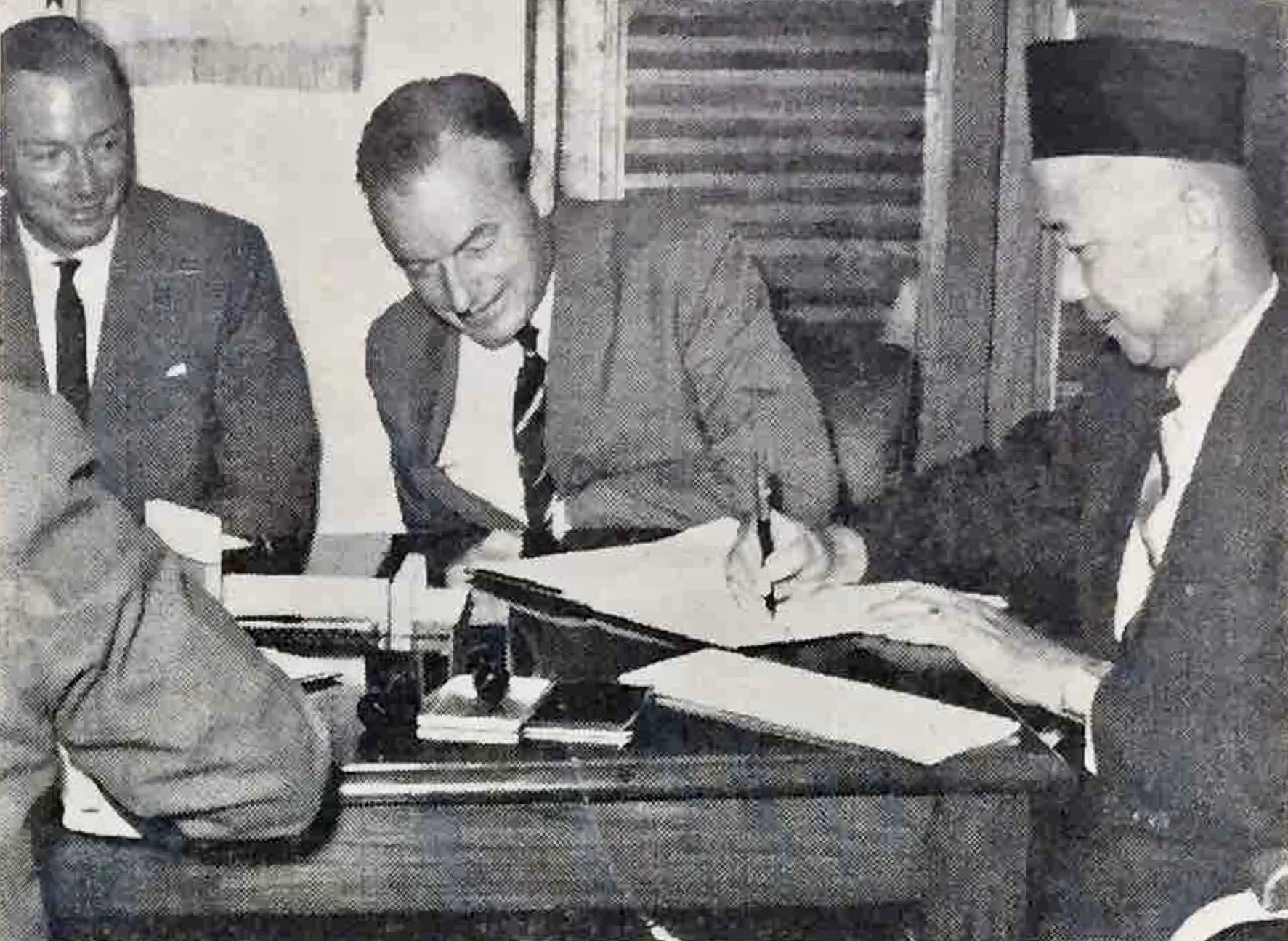
Marsal (right) signing the three petroleum mining agreements in 1963

In April 1963, Marsal delayed the release of three detainees, requesting detailed reports on their involvement in the revolt, while the sultan remained open to their potential support for the government and Malaysia proposal. In May, he, along with other officials, attempted to persuade the sultan to offer a surrender guarantee to rebels, but the sultan refused, citing constitutional, legal, and religious concerns. On 27 November, he announced that the Brunei government delegation to Bangkok had successfully secured an annual rice supply agreement with the Thai government. Later, on 23 December, Marsal signed three petroleum mining agreements on behalf of the Brunei government with Shell plc, covering onshore and offshore state lands, along with an additional agreement.

In 1964, several detainees, including Zaini, Yassin Affandi, and Momin Ahmad, wrote to Marsal, requesting their release. Despite the review committee recommending their release and internal security endorsing it, the government ignored the recommendation, leaving the detainees with little hope for freedom. As a result, they sought asylum in Malaysia, which had promised refuge if they successfully escaped. During this period, Marsal went on holiday to Malaysia with his wife in March, and Pengiran Ali assumed the role of acting chief minister. In the following months, he officiated the opening of the new golf course in Panaga on 23 May, and later, on 16 October, he officially opened the Brunei Scouts Camp in Gadong, emphasising the importance of the Scout oath and laws for the nation's future.

On 17 April 1965, Marsal wrote to the Malaysian Minister of Foreign Affairs, reminding them of the sultan's previous letters regarding Brunei's claim over Limbang, which had not been replied to. He explained that Brunei had rightful claims to Limbang and had never accepted its annexation by Sarawak's Rajah Brooke. He emphasised that both Brunei and Malaysia were Muslim countries, giving Brunei a responsibility to claim the territory as part of its borders. Marsal also stated that the British government had no objection to Brunei directly raising the issue with Malaysia. However, Tunku rejected the letter, citing the 1959 Brunei agreement, which stipulated that Brunei's foreign affairs were still handled by Britain, and Malaysia could only discuss the matter with the British government. Due to health concerns, Marsal took leave on 1 October, with Pengiran Yusuf appointed as acting chief minister.

In June 1967, he was granted another long leave by the sultan, with Pengiran Yusuf again serving as acting chief minister and Taib Besar as acting state secretary. Marsal retired on 4 November 1968 to pursue private business ventures. On 15 March 1969, Marsal, along with Othman Bidin, was honoured at a ceremony held by the PGGMB for their retirement, where both were presented with souvenirs and awarded titles and decorations by Sultan Hassanal Bolkiah.

== Death ==
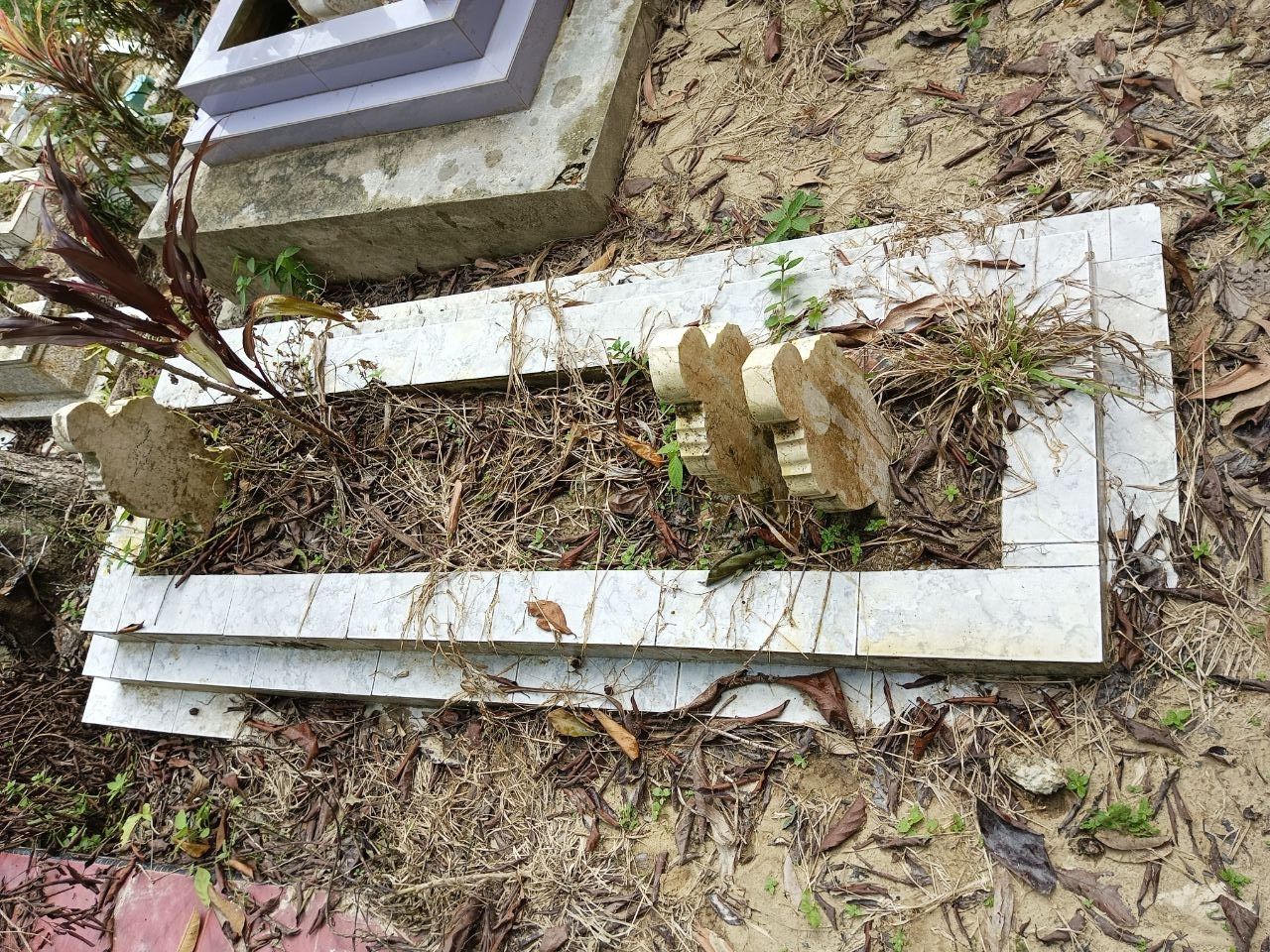
Gravve of Dato Marsal Maun at Telanai Muslim Cemetery, Bandar Seri Begawan

Marsal died in 2000.

== Personal life ==
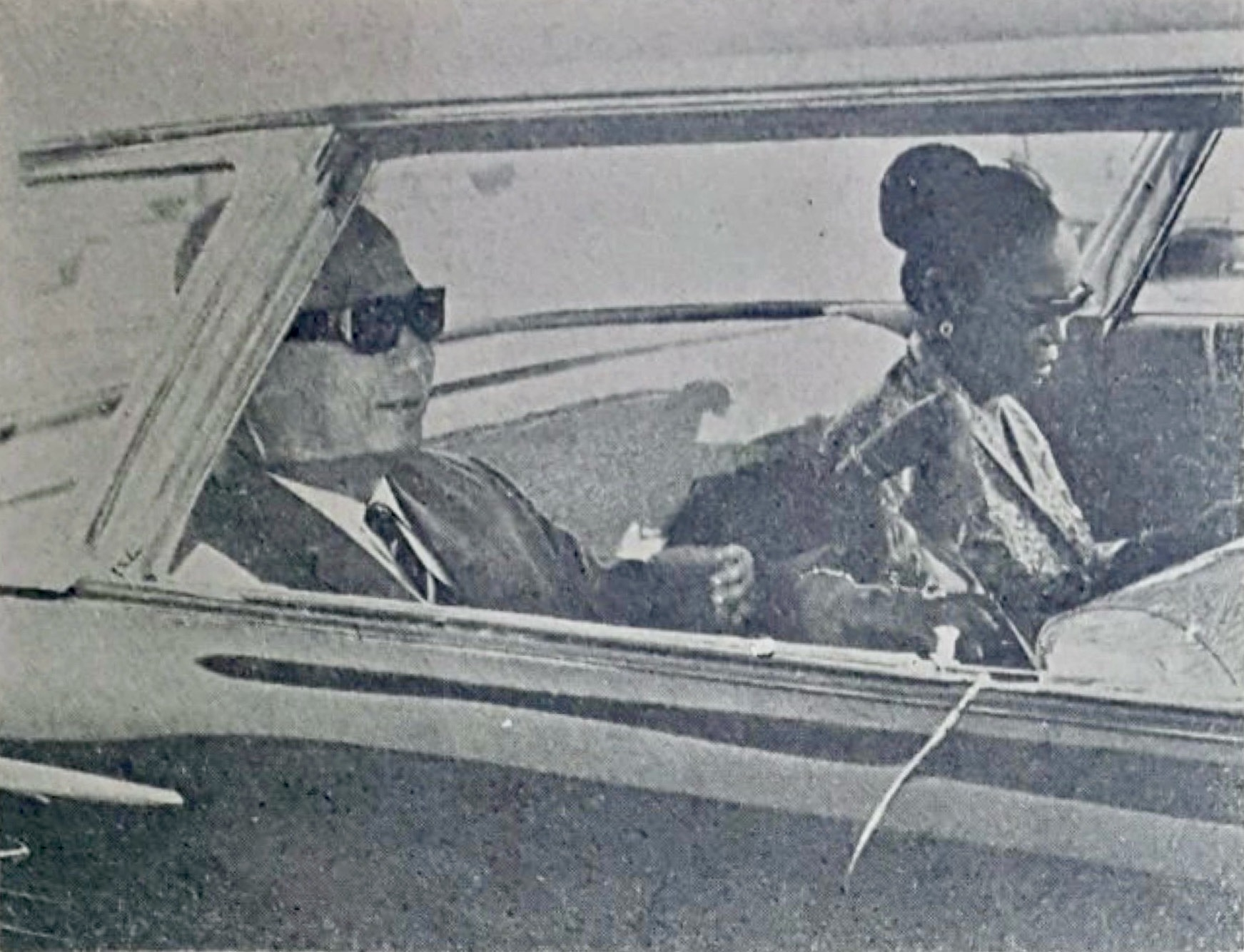
Marsal (left) and Zubaidah (right) pictured together in 1967

Marsal was married to Datin Zubaidah binti Othman, and together they had several children, including Zainuddin, who served as the chairman of PetroBru, and Abdul Jalil. He and his family resided along Jalan Tutong in Kampong Telanai, Bandar Seri Begawan.

== Awards and honours ==
=== Awards ===
- Tokoh Guru Berbakti (1991)

=== Honours ===
Marsal has been bestowed the following honours:

- Order of Seri Paduka Mahkota Brunei First Class (SPMB; 23 September 1963) – Dato Seri Paduka
- Order of Seri Paduka Mahkota Brunei Third Class (SMB; 23 September 1958)
- Order of Setia Negara Brunei Second Class (DSNB; 24 November 1960) – Dato Setia
- Omar Ali Saifuddin Medal (POAS)
- Meritorius Service Medal (PJK; 23 September 1959)
- Omar Ali Saifuddin Coronation Medal (31 May 1951)

=== Things named after him ===
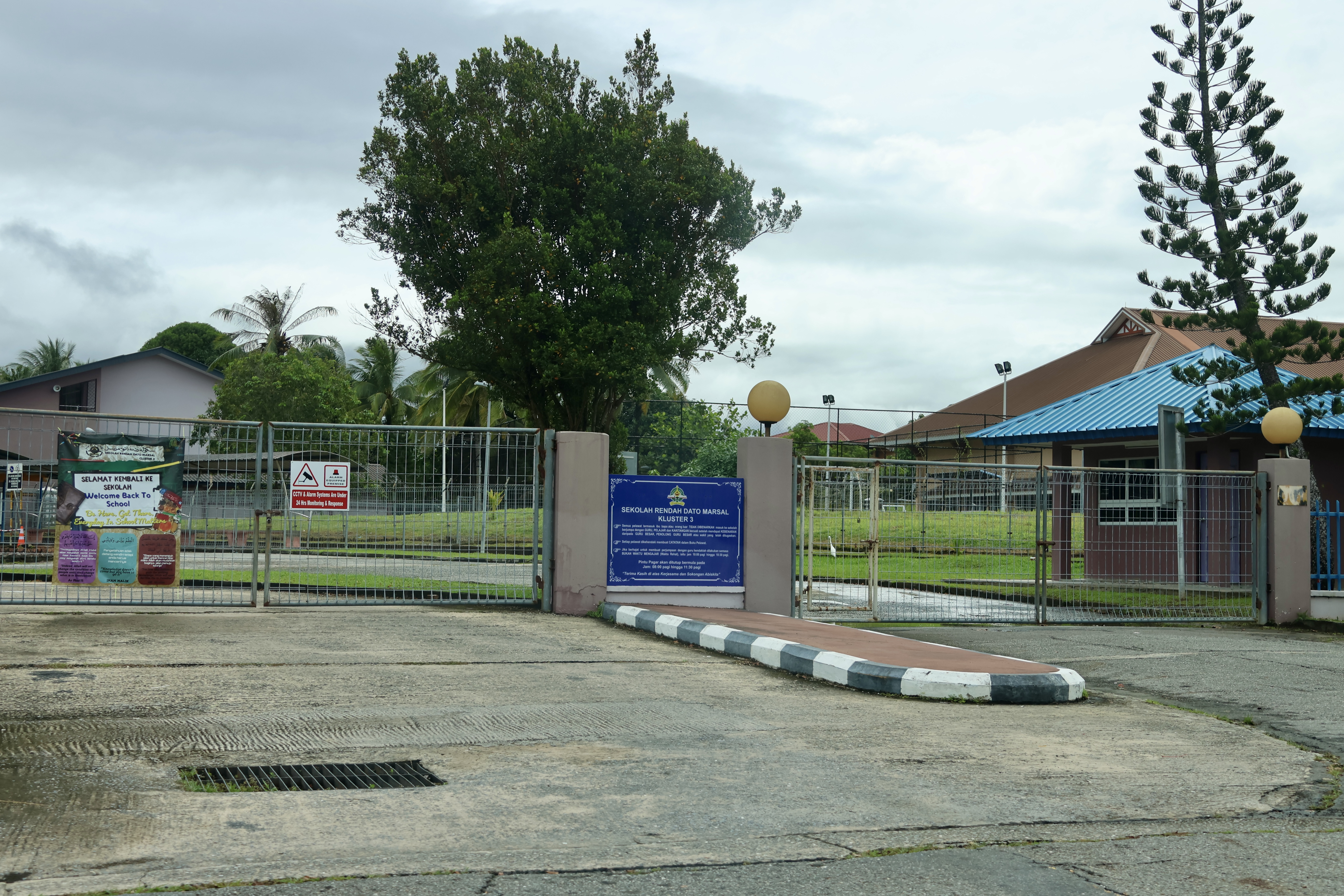
Dato Marsal Primary School

- Jalan Dato Marsal, a road named after him in Bandar Seri Begawan.
- Dato Marsal Primary School, Cluster 3 is a primary school in Lambak Kanan, Bandar Seri Begawan.

== Notes ==
Political offices
Preceded by Ibrahim Mohammad Jahfar	2nd Menteri Besar; 1 September 1962 – 4 November 1968	Succeeded by Pengiran Muhammad Yusuf
