= Council for Estate Agencies =

Agency overview
- Formed: 22 October 2010; 15 years ago
- Jurisdiction: Government of Singapore
- Headquarters: 490, Lorong 6 Toa Payoh, HDB Hub Biz 3, #05-10, Singapore 310490
- Agency executives: Quek See Tiat, President; Lim Chee Hwee, Executive Director
- Parent agency: Ministry of National Development
- Website: www.cea.gov.sg
- Agency ID: T10GB0001C

The Council for Estate Agencies (CEA) was established on 22 October 2010 as a statutory board of the Ministry of National Development to regulate and develop the real estate agency industry in Singapore.

The CEA is governed by a Council which comprises professionals and academicians from sectors related to the real estate agency and related industries, as well as representatives from government agencies involved in the administration of the property market.

The Council is assisted by five Committees – the Audit Committee, Disciplinary Panel, Human Resource & Finance Committee, Professional Development Committee and Select Committee.

In pursuit of its mission to raise the professionalism of the real estate agency industry and safeguard consumer interest, the CEA focuses on three strategic thrusts: effective regulation, industry development and consumer education.

== Vision ==
The vision of the Council for Estate Agencies is to create a professional and trusted real estate agency industry.

== Mission ==
The mission of the Council for Estate Agencies is to raise the professionalism of the real estate agency industry and safeguard consumer interest.

== Three Broad Strategies ==
=== Effective regulation ===
Since 1 January 2011, all property agencies and agents must hold a valid licence or registration respectively, if they wish to conduct any work relating to the sale and leasing of residential, commercial and industrial properties in Singapore.

The duties, business activities and conduct of property agencies and agents are governed by the Estate Agents Act and Regulations, which include the Code of Practice, Code of Ethics and Professional Client Care and the Professional Service Manual.

The CEA also assesses and investigates complaints of breaches or infringements of its laws and regulations through a complaint management process. For contractual disputes, consumers can make use of the Dispute Resolution Scheme if they have signed a prescribed estate agency agreement with a property agent.

Property agencies and agents who are guilty of unsatisfactory conduct or misconduct may be subject to disciplinary action before a Disciplinary Committee (DC). Those involved in more serious breaches may face court prosecution.

=== Industry development ===
The CEA is also responsible for facilitating industry development within the real estate agency sector.

It introduced entry requirements and qualifying criteria, as well as mandatory examinations for those looking at establishing new property agency businesses or joining the industry as property agents. They are required to attend a compulsory Real Estate Agency or Real Estate Salesperson examination preparatory course before taking the respective examinations. As of April 2017, there are a total of 9 approved training providers for the Real Estate Salesperson course:

Benchmark Realpro	Hastor Property Services	Institute of Estate Agents, Singapore
Life Mastery Academy	Pioneer Training & Consultancy	Real Centre Network
Real Estate School	Realty International Associates	Singapore Estate Agents Association

of which only 2 training providers:

Benchmark Realpro	Real Centre Network

offer the Real Estate Agency course.

A key component of the CEA's industry development effort is the mandatory Continuing Professional Development (CPD) requirement. The CPD Scheme requires property agents to upgrade themselves and keep abreast of the latest changes in policies and procedures relating to real estate transactions.

=== Consumer education ===
In line with its philosophy that consumers must take a shared responsibility to ensure a smooth property transaction, the CEA reaches out to consumers through various platforms. These include events such as educational talks, expos, symposiums, seminars and community roadshows, as well as through the media.

The CEA has a Public Register of property agencies and agents. The Public Register can also be assessed via CEA@SG, a free mobile app. Consumers can check the Register to see if the property agency and agent they engage is licensed and registered.

== Definitions ==
Under the Estate Agents Act,

- "Estate Agents", commonly known as property agencies, refer to estate agency businesses (sole proprietors, partnerships and companies)
- "Salespersons", commonly known as property agents, refer to individuals who perform estate agency work

== See also ==
- Ministry of National Development (Singapore)
- Government of Singapore
