= Tan Kia Gan =

Singaporean politician and aircraft engineer (born c. 1921)

Chairman of the Singapore Tourist Promotion Board
- In office 1 January 1966 – 3 November 1966
- Preceded by: K. M. Byrne
- Succeeded by: P. H. Meadows

Chairman of the Housing and Development Board
- In office 19 October 1963 – 10 January 1966
- Preceded by: Lim Kim San
- Succeeded by: Howe Yoon Chong

Minister for National Development
- In office 25 August 1960 – 18 October 1963
- Prime Minister: Lee Kuan Yew
- Preceded by: Toh Chin Chye (acting)
- Succeeded by: Lim Kim San

Member of the Legislative Assembly for Paya Lebar
- In office 1 July 1959 – 3 September 1963
- Preceded by: Lim Koon Teck
- Succeeded by: Kow Kee Seng

Personal details
- Born: c. 1921 Singapore, Straits Settlements
- Spouse: Tan Sock Hoon (m. 1949)
- Children: 6

Chinese name
- Traditional Chinese: 陳家彥
- Simplified Chinese: 陈家彦
Transcriptions
Standard Mandarin
- Hanyu Pinyin: Chén Jiāyàn
- IPA: [ʈʂʰə̌n.tɕjá.jɛ̂n]

Tan Kia Gan (born c. 1921) is a Singaporean former politician and aircraft engineer, who served as chairman of the Singapore Tourist Promotion Board in 1966, before being removed due to corruption allegations. Tan also served as the chairman of the Housing and Development Board from 1963 to 1966.

== Early life and education ==
In 1921, Tan Kia Gan was born in Singapore. He received his early education in Penang, and graduated from the Penang Free School in 1940 with a School Certificate.

== Career ==
=== Early career ===
Upon graduation, Tan qualified as an aircraft engineer with Malayan Airways. In October 1955, as the elected president of the Malayan Airways Local Employees' Union, Tan, together with the union's legal adviser Lee Kuan Yew, negotiated with the airline's management to increase the basic wage of local licensed engineers to match the expatriate staff.

In December 1956, Tan led a strike of 600 local employees after the airline did not issue any bonuses to them before. The employees hoped to get a $1 million goodwill bonus from the airline. Under the advice of Chief Minister Lim Yew Hock, Tan agreed to reduce their demand to show that the union was "a reasonable union". On 15 January 1957, after 22 days of strike, Lim said that he would set up a court of inquiry to look into the cause of the strike and recommendations, and the employees agreed to end the strike and return to work.

=== Political career ===
In the 1959 Singaporean general election, Tan stood as a candidate for the People's Action Party (PAP) in the Paya Lebar Single Member Constituency. His opponent was Ong Chye Hock, an independent candidate. Tan garnered 60.81% of the votes, and was elected into the 2nd Legislative Assembly. Tan was appointed as a parliamentary secretary to the Minister for Home Affairs Ong Pang Boon. On 25 August 1960, after Minister for National Development Ong Eng Guan was fired and expelled from PAP, Tan took over as the Minister for National Development.

In December 1960, Tan announced a plan to build 53,000 Housing and Development Board (HDB) flats at a total cost of $230 million over the next five years. In March 1961, Tan also announced a plan to build about 3,000 HDB flats at a total cost of $6.2 million. The $20 one-room flats were meant to cater to lower-income individuals, and the flats were built in areas such as Kampong Tiong Bahru, Alexandra and MacPherson.

On 31 May 1961, Tan led a debate in the Legislative Assembly on the Bukit Ho Swee fire, and he said that the conflagration was the "worst fire in state since the war" and left 16,000 people homeless. Replacement flats, and a three-month rent subsidy were offered to the victims.

On 31 January 1963, Tan flew to Kuala Lumpur to persuade the federal government to allow imports of Singapore chicken, eggs, and pigs across the causeway. This was the fourth attempt, after three failed attempts by himself, Prime Minister Lee Kuan Yew and Finance Minister Goh Keng Swee.

In the 1963 Singaporean general election, Tan stood for re-election in Paya Lebar. His opponents were Kow Kee Seng from Barisan Sosialis, Lau Tok Keong from the United People's Party, and Goh Yeow Dek from the Singapore Alliance Party. Tan secured 42.1% of the votes, and lost to Kow by 750 votes. As such, on 19 October 1963, Tan took over as the chairman of HDB from Lim Kim San.

=== Later career ===
On 1 January 1966, Tan was appointed as chairman of the Singapore Tourist Promotion Board, succeeding K. M. Byrne. As such, Tan resigned as chairman of the Housing and Development Board on 10 January 1966.

On 3 November 1966, Tan was stripped of all public appointments by the government. Tan was being investigated for attempting to assist businessman Lim Tjin Hauw and his son William Lim in securing the sale of a Boeing aircraft to Malaysian Airways. Tan also acted as an intermediary for his brother-in-law in the sale of a tin mine to Lim. In exchange, Tan received 70,000 shares valued at $1 each. As the witnesses did not want to implicate Tan, he was removed from his public appointments instead. However, during an anti-corruption conference in 2009, Law Minister K. Shanmugam revealed that Tan was eventually charged and convicted.

== Personal life ==
In 1949, Tan married Tan Sock Hoon, a teacher, and they have six children. In August 1954, both of them drew up and executed a deed of separation in Penang. In November 1957, a maintenance order was filed by his wife on Tan, and in February 1958, the Penang Sessions Court ordered him to pay $135 a month for maintenance. In August 1958, Tan's lawyer, Lee Kuan Yew, challenged the jurisdiction of the Penang Sessions Court and requested for the maintenance order to be quashed. The appeal judge agreed with Lee and repealed the maintenance order.

After losing his public appointments, Tan fell into obscurity over the decades and was believed as recently as 2007 to have lived in a one-room Housing and Development Board flat in Bukit Merah. His current situation, including whether he is still alive, is unknown and not publicly documented.

Government offices
Preceded by Toh Chin Chye	Minister for National Development; 1960 – 1963	Succeeded by Lim Kim San
Assembly seats
Preceded by Lim Koon Teck	Member of the Legislative Assembly for Paya Lebar; 1959 – 1963	Succeeded by Kow Kee Seng
