= P. H. Meadows =

British administrator and civil servant (1919–1997)

Percival Herbert Meadows CBE PJG PSB
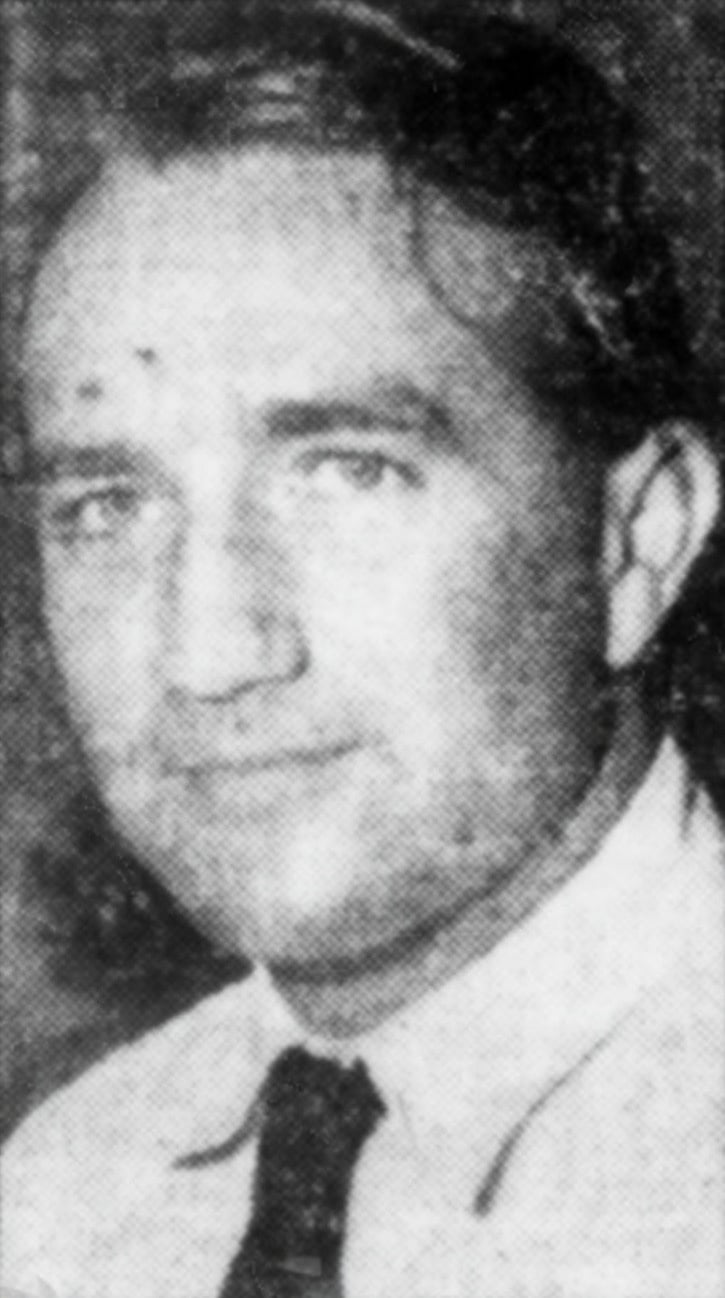
- Meadows, c. 1953

Chairman of the Singapore Tourist Promotion Board
- In office 1 March 1967 – 28 February 1969
- Preceded by: Tan Kia Gan
- Succeeded by: Runme Shaw

Personal details
- Born: 15 May 1919
- Died: July 1997 (aged 78) Norwich, Norfolk, England
- Spouse: Patricia Mary Edwards
- Education: Wye College; Magdalene College, Cambridge; SOAS University of London
- Nicknames: Val; Percey; Percy

Military service
- Allegiance: United Kingdom; British India
- Branch/service: British Army; British Indian Army
- Rank: Major
- Battles/wars: World War II; Burma campaign

Percival Herbert Meadows CBE PJG PSB (15 May 1919 – July 1997) was a British administrator, who also served as a civil servant in North Borneo and Singapore. Meadows fought in World War II, attaining the rank of major at the end of his service.

In 1947, Meadows joined the Colonial Administrative Service and became the chairman of the Singapore Tourist Promotion Board from 1967 to 1969.

== Early life and education ==
On 15 May 1919, Percival Herbert Meadows was born. He received his education at Wye College, specialising in tropical horticulture. After the war, Meadows attended Magdalene College, Cambridge, and SOAS University of London.

== Career ==
=== Military career ===
Following the outbreak of the World War II, Meadows enlisted in the Royal Lincolnshire Regiment. On 10 July 1941, Meadows received an emergency commission to become a second lieutenant, and he was posted to the British India Army. Meadows served in the 8th Battalion of the 12th Frontier Force Regiment, stationed in the North-West Frontier Province. Later on, Meadows went to Karachi for intelligence training, and obtained a pilot's licence in a de Havilland DH.60 Moth.

In 1943, Meadows became a brigade intelligence officer in the 74th Indian Infantry Brigade, stationed in the Arakan Division. Meadows was responsible for establishing a patrol and ambush base six miles down the Naf River, south of Maungdaw. More than 120 Japanese soldiers were killed, after Meadows personally led small teams into Japanese territory to conduct ambushes. On 15 November 1944, in view of his conduct, Meadows was nominated by his commanding officer for a Military Cross.

In 1945, Meadows was transferred to the 2nd Gurkha Rifles and became a station commander. After that, Meadows was promoted to the rank of major.

=== Civil career ===
In 1947, Meadows joined the Colonial Administrative Service as an administrative officer. He was posted to North Borneo. In 1949, Meadows was appointed as the honorary consul in Portuguese Macau, where he also sent intelligence reports on the Chinese Civil War to London. In July 1951, after completing a course on sinology in Macau, Meadows was appointed as the assistant commissioner for labour in Singapore. In 1952, Meadows was promoted to commissioner for labour in Kelantan, Terengganu and Pahang.

In January 1953, Meadows was appointed as the deputy secretary for the social welfare department under the Ministry of Labour. In April 1953, Meadows stated that young girls were still being used as lures in opium dens to attract new addicts, and believed if a new investigation was conducted, fresh evidence may be uncovered to support the statement. In August 1953, Meadows announced that the anti-vice section under his department conducted 75 raids in the previous month on hotels and other places. As such, the number of prostitutes operating in Singapore decreased, and Meadows added that they have shifted their operations to Johore Bahru. However, an official from Johore Bahru refuted his statement, and said there have been no noticeable increase of prostitutes in the city.

In 1957, Meadows was appointed as the chairman of the Singapore Rural Board. In November 1957, he suggested to the Marine Police that they should not take any action against islanders who use their own fishing boats to carry belongings and passengers, given that there is no public transport to offshore islands. Meadows also asked the Ministry of Commerce and Industry to amend the port rules to allow islanders of the Southern Islands to carry passengers on their fishing boats, since the islanders had no other form of transport.

In September 1959, the Singapore Rural Board was absorbed by the Ministry of National Development, and as such in November 1959, Meadows was transferred to the Prime Minister's Office. In 1960, Meadows was formally appointed as the secretary for special duties to Prime Minister Lee Kuan Yew. Meadows retired from the civil service in 1962.

=== Later career ===
In August 1964, Meadows joined the board of Pan-Electric Industries.

On 1 March 1967, after Tan Kia Gan was fired, Meadows took over as chairman of the Singapore Tourist Promotion Board. In December 1968, Meadows announced a plan to convert Pulau Tekukor into a tourist island resort within 18 months. However, the plan was shelved. In January 1969, Meadows disclosed a plan to develop Pulau Blakang Mati into a tourist island. On 28 February 1969, Meadows stepped down as chairman, and he was succeeded by Runme Shaw.

In 1971, Meadows was the chairman of the National Bank in Brunei. In 1973, he was also appointed as the executive chairman of Far East–Levingston Shipbuilding (FELS), and later managing director on 1 October 1974. On 31 July 1980, Meadows retired. George Bogaars was elected as the new chairman of FELS, and Low Wing Siew as managing director.

== Personal life ==
Meadows was married to Patricia Mary Edwards (1922 – 13 January 2024). His wife arrived in Singapore in 1952.

In 1964, Minister for Finance Goh Keng Swee suggested the production of local souvenirs, as opposed to imported, to "give Singapore an identity in the minds of tourists". As such, in 1968, a company, Design Singapura, was established by entrepreneur Donald Moore to promote local arts and crafts. Meadows was appointed as a director of the board, and his wife thought of manufacturing unique Singaporean handwoven products, marketed as Khersonese silk. His wife came across the ancient Greek name for the Malayan peninsula after reading a book. She also served as the production manager of the factory located off MacPherson Road.

As Meadows' wife wanted to reach out to a wider customer base and sell more Khersonese silk products, she began custom-making a small batch of silk kimonos, and sold several pieces to British socialites. By 1973, demand for the product slowly disappeared. In 2023, five pieces of Meadows' wife Khersonese silk products were donated by herself to the National Heritage Board.

Upon his retirement, Meadows and his wife moved to Norwich, Norfolk. In July 1997, at the age of 78, Meadows died.

== Awards and decorations ==
=== Military ===
- 1939–1945 Star
- Burma Star
- Defence Medal
- War Medal 1939–1945, mentioned in despatch.
- Territorial Efficiency Medal
- Military Cross, in 1945.

=== Civil ===
- Commander of the Most Excellent Order of the British Empire, in 1963.
- Meritorious Service Medal, in 1969.
- Order of Loyalty to the State of Brunei (Fourth Class)
