= Building and Construction Authority =

Singaporean government agency

Agency overview
- Formed: 1 April 1999; 27 years ago
- Jurisdiction: Government of Singapore
- Headquarters: 52 Jurong Gateway Road #11-01, Singapore 608550
- Agency executives: Tan Thiam Soon, Chairman; Kelvin Wong, CEO
- Parent agency: Ministry of National Development (Singapore)
- Website: www.bca.gov.sg
- Agency ID: T08GB0005B

The Building and Construction Authority (BCA) is a statutory board under the Ministry of National Development of the Government of Singapore. It was established on 1 April 1999 through the merger of the Construction Industry Development Board and the Building Control Division of the former Public Works Department.

The primary role of BCA is to develop and regulate Singapore's building and construction industry.

== Building safety ==
BCA ensures that buildings in Singapore are designed, constructed and maintained to high standards of safety through its building regulatory system.

In October 2004, BCA issued a window retrofitting order, requiring aluminium rivets fitted on casement windows to be replaced with stainless steel rivets. Since the order came into force, BCA and the Housing Development Board (HDB) have been urging property owners and tenants to practise window safety through a public campaign. Every year, 6 June and 12 December have been designated as "Window Safety Days", where property owners and tenants are encouraged to check their windows at least once every six months.

BCA is also the lead agency in Singapore in regulating amusement rides to protect public safety. In July 2011, a new regulatory framework was introduced to protect the safety of ride-goers in Singapore.

== Sustainability ==
BCA actively promotes the use of green building technologies and designs through its Green Building Masterplan and various initiatives. Under the second Green Building Masterplan which was launched in 2009, BCA seeks to achieve the national target of greening at least 80% of the buildings in Singapore by 2030.

The BCA Green Mark Scheme was launched in 2005 to promote sustainability in the built environment and raise environmental awareness among developers, designers and builders. It assesses the environmental friendliness and energy efficiency of buildings. In 2005, there were only 17 Green Mark building projects in Singapore.

In 2009, BCA launched South-East Asia's first zero-energy building (ZEB) located at the BCA Academy of the Built Environment. The ZEB was retrofitted from an existing building and serves as a test-bedding centre for green building technologies. The building is expected to be about 40-50% more efficient than an office building of similar layout.

In 2010, BCA became the first government agency outside North America to be conferred the Aspen Institute's Energy and Environment Award (Government) for its comprehensive policies and programmes in steering development of green buildings and sustainable construction. In 2011, Singapore was ranked first in green building policies, before advanced cities like Tokyo, Sydney and Seoul, in a study conducted by Solidiance on Asia-Pacific cities.

In December 2011, there are more than 940 green building projects, translating to a gross floor area of about 300 million ft2, or 12% of Singapore's total gross floor area. The BCA Green Mark Scheme includes districts, parks, infrastructure, office interiors, and residential and non-residential buildings. In 2011, the Scheme was extended to include restaurants and existing schools. The scheme has also extended its reach beyond Singapore . More than 120 projects in countries like China, Malaysia, Vietnam, Brunei, India, Thailand, Saudi Arabia, Indonesia, The Philippines and Tanzania have applied for the Green Mark certification.

BCA clinched the inaugural Regional Leadership Award, one of the six awards handed out at the World Green Building Council Government Leadership Awards 2011, for its Green Building Masterplan and leadership in the green building movement in Asia Pacific.

BCA collaborates with the United Nations Environment Programme (UNEP) to promote sustainable building practices. In 2011, BCA and UNEP finalised an agreement establishing BCA's Centre for Sustainable Buildings as a "Centre Collaborating with UNEP", the first in Asia. Through the collaboration, both BCA and UNEP will provide policy advice and outreach activities related to sustainable building resource management in sector in tropical cities and regions worldwide.

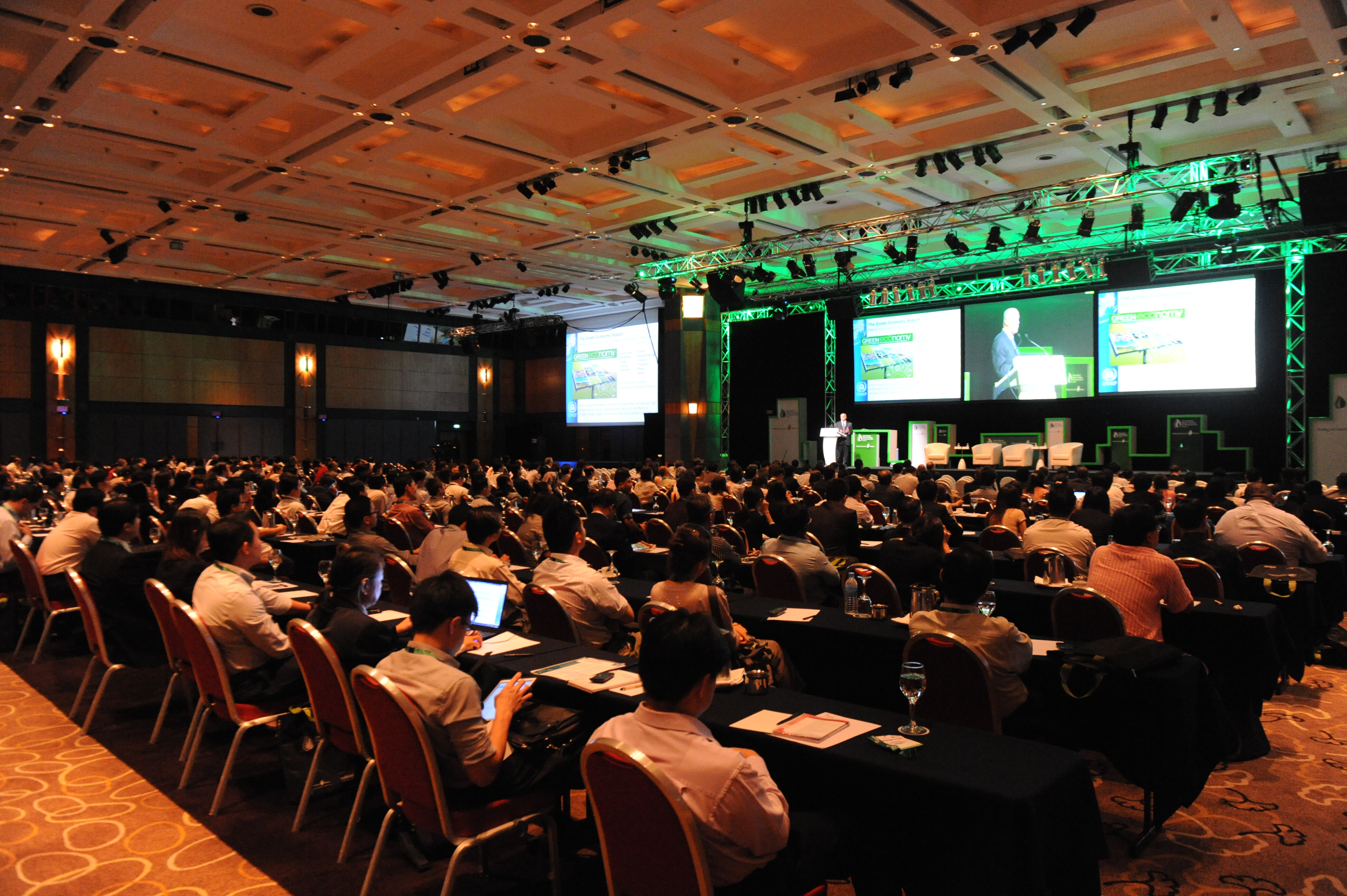
Close to 1,000 delegates attended the International Green Building Conference 2011

BCA organised the second International Green Building Conference in September 2011 during the Singapore Green Building Week. The event attracted close to 1,000 delegates from over 32 countries, including industry experts, practitioners, and policy-makers, Other green building events that BCA conducts include the roving BCA Green Building Exhibitions with green building tips and information for residents to make their homes more environmentally friendly. The annual BCA Awards recognises sustainable buildings, and honours industry professionals committed to safe, high quality and user-friendly buildings.

In 2016, BCA set up the world's first high-rise rotatable laboratory for the tropics - the BCA SkyLab. Modelled after the Lawrence Berkeley National Laboratory's FLEXLAB, the facility is a rotatable test facility pivotal to developing energy efficient building technologies.

== Accessibility ==
In 1990, BCA introduced the Code on Barrier-Free Accessibility, reshaping the accessibility landscape of Singapore's built environment by improving inter-connectivity between buildings and upgrading existing buildings to make them more accessible. A $40 million fund has been set aside to co-fund voluntary upgrading on basic barrier-free features over a period of five years. Additionally, BCA has legislative measures in place to ensure continued compliance to the Code and to prevent misuse of barrier-free facilities.

BCA also promotes Universal Design (UD) for buildings to cater to the needs of all users, including the young, the elderly, people with disabilities, and parents with infants. The BCA Universal Design Award was launched in early 2007, recognising outstanding achievements by building developers and owners to incorporate barrier-free accessibility and UD in their developments.

BCA maintains an Accessibility Rating System on its Friendly Buildings portal, which classifies buildings according to levels of user-friendliness. The system provides detailed information such as the location of accessible entrances and other accessibility facilities, to aid building users on locating accessible buildings in Singapore. By December 2011, about 3,000 buildings have been rated of which 2,200 of them are accessible.

== Training and professional standards ==
BCA has put in place many schemes to help raise the construction industry's skill levels and professionalism, design and construction capabilities, niche expertise, and the export of construction-related services. Some examples are the Construction Registration of Tradesmen (CoreTrade) Scheme to establish a core base of trade foremen and tradesmen, and the BCA Academy of the Built Environment to develop a professional workforce and encourage the adoption of innovative technologies. BCA International, a wholly owned subsidiary formed by BCA, paves the way for local construction companies to offer a full scope of expertise and value-added services to assist overseas governments and clients in developing excellent built environments.

BCA also established a Construction Productivity Gallery and a Centre for Lean and Virtual Construction to guide and advise construction firms on the latest construction technologies and re-engineering processes to achieve time and labour savings. This is in line with Singapore's national productivity drive, where BCA introduced a S$250-million Construction Productivity and Capability Fund (CPCF) in June 2010 to help the construction industry build up a skilled workforce, adopt more advanced construction technologies, and enhance building capability in niche areas.

BCA strongly promotes the adoption of Building Information Modelling (BIM), which allows professionals to work on a building project digitally before it is built. BCA targets to get 80 per cent of the industry to use BIM widely by 2015, and is working with the public sector to take the lead in driving greater BIM adoption.

== See also ==
- Ministry of National Development
