= Ministry of National Development (Singapore) =

Government ministry

Agency overview
- Jurisdiction: Government of Singapore
- Headquarters: 5 Maxwell Road, #21-00 & #22-00 Tower Block, MND Complex, Singapore 069110
- Motto: An Endearing Home, A Distinctive Global City
- Employees: 9,063 (2018)
- Annual budget: ▼ S$3.35 billion (2019)
- Ministers responsible: Chee Hong Tat, Minister; Indranee Rajah, Second Minister; Sun Xueling, Senior Minister of State; Alvin Tan, Minister of State; Syed Harun Alhabsyi, Senior Parliamentary Secretary
- Agency executives: Loh Ngai Seng, Permanent Secretary; Cham Dao Song, Deputy Secretary (Planning); Geraldine Low, Deputy Secretary (Development)
- Child agencies: Building and Construction Authority; Council for Estate Agencies; Housing and Development Board; National Parks Board; Urban Redevelopment Authority; Municipal Services Office (Singapore)
- Website: www.mnd.gov.sg
- Agency ID: T08GA0020L

The Ministry of National Development (MND; Malay: Kementerian Pembangunan Negara; Chinese: 国家发展部; Tamil: தேசிய வளர்ச்சி அமைச்சு) is a ministry of the Government of Singapore responsible for the formulation and implementation of policies related to the land-use planning and infrastructure development in Singapore.

== History ==
The ministry was established after the 1959 legislative assembly elections. It was originally composed of departments previously under the Ministry of Local Government, Lands and Housing, Ministry of Communications and Works, the City Council and Rural Board (Architectural and Buildings Surveyors Section), and Ministry of Commerce and Industry (Fisheries, Veterinary Services and Rural Development).

== Responsibilities ==
MND's key responsibilities include the planning, management and redevelopment of land resources and the development of public housing. The promotion of the construction sector, as well as the management and improvement of industry standards in the real estate agent sector also come under the purview of the ministry. The MND is also tasked with the development and management of green spaces, recreational infrastructure and the conservation of nature areas. It is also the ministry in charge of animal health and welfare.

== Organisational structure ==
The MND is made up of nine divisions: Strategic Planning Division, Housing Division, Infrastructure Division, Research & Strategy Management Division, Corporate Development Division, Strategic Communications and Engagement Division, the Eco-City Project Office, the Centre for Liveable Cities and the Internal Audit Unit. On 1 October 2014, the Municipal Services Office was set up under the Ministry of National Development, with the aim to improve the Government's overall coordination and delivery of municipal services.

=== Strategic Planning ===
The Strategic Planning Division works with the Urban Redevelopment Authority to help Singapore meet its land use needs with respect to the economy and living environment. It also comes up with policies relating to land use sales/planning, development control and the private property market.

=== Housing ===
The Housing Division works with the Housing Development Board to plan and develop public housing towns that provide Singaporeans with affordable homes. The division's aims include community cohesion (by providing community spaces for interaction) and policies that support social objectives, such as racial harmony (Ethnic Integration Policy) and stronger family ties (CPF Housing Grant for those who live near their parents).

The Housing Division is responsible for policies on home ownership, public rental housing for low income families and the rejuvenation of older estates, amongst others.

=== Infrastructure ===
The Infrastructure Division works with the Building and Construction Authority to shape the built environment for Singapore via building safety, construction quality, sustainability of buildings and construction, and the usability of the built environment. The Infrastructure Division also develops policies on the construction industry, sustainable development, accessibility, and building safety and quality.

The Infrastructure Division also partners the National Parks Board to integrate Singapore's urban infrastructure and garden environments. Together, they develop policies on enhancing greenery infrastructure, encouraging community participation in greening, and developing the horticultural industry. They also take care of veterinary issues too after the disbandment of Agri-Food and Veterinary Authority

=== Eco-City Project Office ===
The Eco-City Project Office spearheads the Sino-Singapore Tianjin Eco-City, which seeks to address the challenges of sustainable development in a holistic and balanced manner.

=== Centre for Liveable Cities ===
The Centre for Liveable Cities (CLC) was set up in 2008 by the MND and the Ministry of the Environment and Water Resources. It is a research think tank that focuses on sustainable urban development. It seeks to understand Singapore's transformation in the last five decades, and to create and share knowledge and urban solutions for "current and future challenges relevant to Singapore and other cities".

== Statutory Boards ==
The ministry oversees five statutory boards and three professional committees. These are:

- Building and Construction Authority (BCA)
- Council for Estate Agencies (CEA)
- Housing & Development Board (HDB)
- National Parks Board (NParks)
- Urban Redevelopment Authority (URA)

== Ministers ==
The Ministry is headed by the Minister for National Development, who is appointed as part of the Cabinet of Singapore. The incubment Minister is Chee Hong Tat, an MP for Bishan–Toa Payoh GRC from the People's Action Party.

Minister	Took office	Left office	Party	Cabinet
Ong Eng Guan; MP for Hong Lim (1925–2008)	5 June 1959	20 June 1960	PAP	Lee K. I
Toh Chin Chye; MP for Rochore (1921–2012)	20 June 1960	25 August 1960	PAP	Lee K. I
Tan Kia Gan; MP for Paya Lebar (born 1921)	25 August 1960	18 October 1963	PAP	Lee K. I
Lim Kim San; MP for Cairnhill (1916–2006)	19 October 1963	8 August 1965	PAP	Lee K. II
E. W. Barker; MP for Tanglin (1920–2001)	9 August 1965	1 June 1975	PAP	Lee K. II
E. W. Barker; MP for Tanglin (1920–2001)	9 August 1965	1 June 1975	PAP	Lee K. III
E. W. Barker; MP for Tanglin (1920–2001)	9 August 1965	1 June 1975	PAP	Lee K. IV
Lim Kim San; MP for Cairnhill (1916–2006)	2 June 1975	31 January 1979	PAP	Lee K. IV
Lim Kim San; MP for Cairnhill (1916–2006)	2 June 1975	31 January 1979	PAP	Lee K. V
Teh Cheang Wan; MP for Geylang West (1928–1986)	1 February 1979	14 December 1986	PAP	Lee K. V
Teh Cheang Wan; MP for Geylang West (1928–1986)	1 February 1979	14 December 1986	PAP	Lee K. VI
Teh Cheang Wan; MP for Geylang West (1928–1986)	1 February 1979	14 December 1986	PAP	Lee K. VII
S. Dhanabalan; MP for Kallang SMC (born 1937)	1 January 1987	31 August 1992	PAP	Lee K. VII
S. Dhanabalan; MP for Kallang SMC (born 1937)	1 January 1987	31 August 1992	PAP	Lee K. VIII
S. Dhanabalan; MP for Kallang SMC (born 1937)	1 January 1987	31 August 1992	PAP	Goh I
S. Dhanabalan; MP for Kallang SMC (born 1937)	1 January 1987	31 August 1992	PAP	Goh II
Richard Hu; MP for Kreta Ayer SMC (1926–2023)	1 September 1992	1 January 1994	PAP	Goh II
Lim Hng Kiang (Note: Lim Hng Kiang served as acting minister from 2 January 1994 until 16 April 1995.); MP for Tanjong Pagar GRC (until 1996) and West Coast GRC (from 1997) (born 1954)	2 January 1994	16 April 1995	PAP	Goh II
Lim Hng Kiang; MP for Tanjong Pagar GRC (until 1996) and West Coast GRC (from 1997) (born 1954)	17 April 1995	2 June 1999	PAP	Goh II
Lim Hng Kiang; MP for Tanjong Pagar GRC (until 1996) and West Coast GRC (from 1997) (born 1954)	17 April 1995	2 June 1999	PAP	Goh III
Mah Bow Tan; MP for Tampines GRC (born 1948)	2 June 1999	20 May 2011	PAP	Goh III
Mah Bow Tan; MP for Tampines GRC (born 1948)	2 June 1999	20 May 2011	PAP	Goh IV
Mah Bow Tan; MP for Tampines GRC (born 1948)	2 June 1999	20 May 2011	PAP	Lee H. I
Mah Bow Tan; MP for Tampines GRC (born 1948)	2 June 1999	20 May 2011	PAP	Lee H. II
Khaw Boon Wan; MP for Sembawang GRC (born 1952)	21 May 2011	30 September 2015	PAP	Lee H. III
Lawrence Wong; MP for Marsiling–Yew Tee GRC (born 1972)	1 October 2015	26 July 2020	PAP	Lee H. IV
Desmond Lee; MP for West Coast GRC (born 1976)	27 July 2020	22 May 2025	PAP	Lee H. V
Desmond Lee; MP for West Coast GRC (born 1976)	27 July 2020	22 May 2025	PAP	Wong I
Chee Hong Tat; MP for Bishan–Toa Payoh GRC (born 1973)	23 May 2025	Incumbent	PAP	Wong II
